= Goofy (film series) =

American animated short film series

- Introductory title of the Goofy short film series
- Production companies: Walt Disney Productions (1-44); Walt Disney Pictures (45); Walt Disney Animation Studios (45)
- Distributed by: RKO Radio Pictures (1-44) (Note: Distributed by Buena Vista Distribution in reissues of the short films.); Walt Disney Studios Motion Pictures (45)
- Country: United States
- Language: English

Goofy is a series of American animated comedy short films produced by Walt Disney Productions. The series started in 1939 with Goofy and Wilbur and ended in 1953 with How to Sleep. An additional short, How to Hook Up Your Home Theater, was released in 2007. The series stars the titular character Goofy, introduced in the short film series Mickey Mouse as one of Mickey's friends.

== Production ==
The shorts were produced by Walt Disney Productions, and distributed by RKO Radio Pictures (the shorts were later distributed by Buena Vista Distribution in re-releases). Like other Disney animated shorts in the golden age of American animation starring other characters, the shorts began with a starburst with a close-up of Goofy's face, followed by the title "A Walt Disney Goofy" or "Walt Disney Presents Goofy", depending on the cartoon.

The shorts include a sub-series known as "How to...", which show Goofy in situations that explain to the public how to do different types of activities, including sports, practicing different professions, or types of hobbies, always being explained by a narrator. Other similar short films also began with the title "The Art of...".

During the late 1940s and 1950s, Goofy was shown in stories as an "everyman", being portrayed as an urban man in everyday situations. In these shorts, he is referred to by the name "George Geef" and has a more humanized appearance.

Also during the 1950s, Goofy starred in four short films under the title "Fathers", showing Goofy acting as a father to his son, Goofy Junior (who years later would become known as "Max Goof").

From 1939 to 1953, at least one short film in the Goofy series was released annually, with an additional short film (How to Hook Up Your Home Theater) being released in 2007. Most of the shorts were directed by Jack Kinney.

== List of films ==
The following is a list of Goofy short films.

The list doesn't include shorts from other series where Goofy appears, such as the Mickey Mouse series, the Donald & Goofy series, or other Disney short films from that aren't part of the Goofy series, segments from feature films (such as El Gaucho Goofy), nor shorts of Goofy made as part of the episodes of the television series Mickey Mouse Works.

=== 1939 ===
#	Title	Director	Release
1	Goofy and Wilbur	Dick Huemer	March 17, 1939
Goofy goes fishing with his pet grasshopper, Wilbur, who acts as bait by jumping across the water to attract the fish. Other appearances: Wilbur

=== 1940 ===
#	Title	Director	Release
2	Goofy's Glider	Jack Kinney	November 22, 1940
Goofy tries to fly on a small glider, while the Narrator explains different ways he can take off, but always runs into different setbacks when doing so. Other appearances: Narrator (voice; debut)

=== 1941 ===
#	Title	Director	Release
3	Baggage Buster	Jack Kinney	March 28, 1941
Goofy is the baggage attendant at a train station. When he has to check a magician's trunk, he gets into trouble when a rabbit comes out of a hat and the animal doesn't want to go back inside. Later, Goofy has another problem when the trunk begins to float, or different props come out from inside, including a cape that makes different types of animals appear. Other appearances: Rabbit, Bull; cameo of Pluto
4	The Art of Skiing	Jack Kinney	November 14, 1941
The Narrator uses Goofy as an example to explain how to ski, showing different styles. Other appearances: Narrator (voice) Notes: The short introduces Goofy's famous "Goofy Holler" ("Eeeeeeeeeh ho ho hooey!").
5	The Art of Self Defense	Jack Kinney	December 26, 1941
The Narrator explains how self-defense has evolved through the ages, using Goofy in different roles from various eras as an example. Until finally, he explains through Goofy how to box. Other appearances: Narrator (voice)

=== 1942 ===
#	Title	Director	Release
6	How to Play Baseball	Jack Kinney	April 18, 1942
The Narrator explains what the game of baseball is like using Goofy as an example of the different positions on the team and the different plays they can make. Other appearances: Narrator (voice) Notes: First short film in the "How to..." series.
7	The Olympic Champ	Jack Kinney	October 9, 1942
The Narrator tells the story of the Olympic Games, and uses Goofy to explain the different sports competitions that take place at the event. Other appearances: Narrator (voice)
8	How to Swim	Jack Kinney	October 23, 1942
Goofy is shown explaining how to swim while the Narrator explains the steps that need to be done. Other appearances: Narrator (voice)
9	How to Fish	Jack Kinney	December 9, 1942
After the Narrator explains how the instinct to fish is triggered, he uses Goofy as an example of a fisherman to show how to fish. Other appearances: Narrator (voice)

=== 1943 ===
#	Title	Director	Release
10	Victory Vehicles	Jack Kinney	July 30, 1943
The Narrator explains how the citizens (played by Goofy) improvise different vehicles due to the car shortage. In the end, the pogo stick being their solution to use. Other appearances: Narrator (voice); cameo of Pluto

=== 1944 ===
#	Title	Director	Release
11	How to Be a Sailor	Jack Kinney	January 28, 1944
Through characters in different periods of history (played by Goofy), the Narrator explains how types of sailors have evolved over time. Other appearances: Narrator (voice)
12	How to Play Golf	Jack Kinney	March 10, 1944
Goofy serves as an example of how to play golf, while the Narrator explains the steps to follow. A stick figure golfer also acts as a guide. Other appearances: Narrator (voice), Stick figure golfer, Bull
13	How to Play Football	Jack Kinney	September 15, 1944
The Narrator explains how to play American football, with Goofy in the role of the players, referee, coach, and spectators. Other appearances: Narrator (voice) Notes: Nominated for Academy Award for Best Animated Short Film, being the only one in the Goofy series to receive said nomination.

=== 1945 ===
#	Title	Director	Release
14	Tiger Trouble	Jack Kinney	January 5, 1945
Mounted on his elephant, Goofy goes to hunt tigers in the jungle while the Narrator explains his actions. Other appearances: Narrator (voice), Dolores the Elephant (debut), Raja the Tiger
15	African Diary	Jack Kinney	April 20, 1945
Goofy recounts his experiences in Africa from his diary, recounting his journey through the savannah, where he ends up in trouble with a rhinoceros. Other appearances: Black rhinoceros, Titbird
16	Hockey Homicide	Jack Kinney	September 21, 1945
The Narrator comments on the plays of an ice hockey game, in which Goofy plays the players, referee and spectators. Other appearances: Narrator (voice)

=== 1946 ===
#	Title	Director	Release
17	A Knight for a Day	Jack Hannah	March 8, 1946
In the Middle Ages, the Narrator comments on the actions of a medieval tournament, with the characters present being played by Goofy. The central character is Cedric, a squire who poses as his master, Sir Loinsteak, after the latter was knocked unconscious. Other appearances: Narrator (voice)
18	Double Dribble	Jack Hannah	December 20, 1946
The Narrator comments on the plays of a basketball game, in which Goofy plays the players, referee, coach, and spectators. One of the characters being Merrithew, a short player that the others don't take seriously. Other appearances: Narrator (voice)

=== 1947 ===
#	Title	Director	Release
19	Foul Hunting	Jack Hannah	October 31, 1947
To hunt ducks, Goofy uses a toy duck to attract them, but when the toy crosses paths with a real duck, Goofy doesn't know which duck is fake and which is real. After discovering the real duck, he chases after it to hunt it, but his clumsiness constantly makes it difficult for him to hunt it and other ducks. Other appearances: Ducks

=== 1948 ===
#	Title	Director	Release
20	They're Off	Jack Hannah	January 23, 1948
The Narrator explains what the horse racing hobby is like, with Goofy playing the fans and the jockeys. Other appearances: Narrator (voice), Snapshot III, Old Moe
21	The Big Wash	Clyde Geronimi	February 6, 1948
At a circus, Dolores the Elephant wakes up her keeper, Goofy, to feed her. After that, Goofy prepares to give Dolores a bath, but she refuses, and hides from Goofy to avoid taking a bath. Other appearances: Dolores the Elephant

=== 1949 ===
#	Title	Director	Release
22	Tennis Racquet	Jack Kinney	August 26, 1949
Goofy is the announcer in a tennis match, where the players (Big Ben and Little Joe), the court gardener and the spectators are also played by him.
23	Goofy Gymnastics	Jack Kinney	September 23, 1949
The Narrator encourages Goofy to buy some gym equipment to work out at home and build muscle, which includes a disc on which a coach explains the steps to follow. Other appearances: Coach (voice), Narrator (voice)

=== 1950 ===
#	Title	Director	Release
24	Motor Mania	Jack Kinney	July 30, 1950
The Narrator uses Mr. Walker (played by Goofy) as an example to show how people can go crazy behind the wheel of their cars. Other appearances: Narrator (voice; referred to as "Mr. Geef")
25	Hold That Pose	Jack Kinney	November 3, 1950
Goofy takes up photography as a hobby, with the Narrator giving directions. Goofy tries to photograph a bear, which ends up getting angry and chasing Goofy, who still tries to get the photo. Other appearances: Narrator (voice), Humphrey the Bear (debut)

=== 1951 ===
#	Title	Director	Release
26	Lion Down	Jack Kinney	January 5, 1951
Goofy wants to relax in a hammock in his garden. Seeing how comfortable it looks, Louie the Mountain Lion removes Goofy from the hammock to lie down himself. Soon a battle between the two begins in which one constantly tries to remove the other from the hammock in some way to be able to lie down in his place. Other appearances: Louie the Mountain Lion
27	Home Made Home	Jack Kinney	March 23, 1951
Goofy builds a house to live in, while the Narrator explains the steps to follow in the construction. Other appearances: Narrator (voice)
28	Cold War	Jack Kinney	April 27, 1951
Goofy (under the name "George Geef") must leave work and go home when he comes down with a cold, eventually feeling terribly unwell. Other appearances: Narrator (voice), Cold Virus, Mrs. Geef, Geef's Boss Notes: Goofy's first appearance under the identity of "George Geef".
29	Tomorrow We Diet!	Jack Kinney	June 29, 1951
An obese Goofy begins to have problems because of his weight, so he decides to go on a diet, but the food is still a temptation for him. Other appearances: Narrator (voice)
30	Get Rich Quick	Jack Kinney	August 31, 1951
Goofy (as George Geef) is a fan of gambling because he thinks that this way he can become rich one day, but he always ends up losing money. Other appearances: Narrator (voice), Mrs. Geef
31	Fathers Are People	Jack Kinney	October 21, 1951
Goofy (George Geef) becomes a father, he finds it difficult to change diapers and prepare a bottle in the middle of the night. When his son grows up, things do not improve because the kid turns out to be quite naughty. Other appearances: Goofy Junior (debut), Mrs. Geef, Narrator (voice); cameo of Mickey Mouse as an image in Junior's crib
32	No Smoking	Jack Kinney	November 23, 1951
The Narrator tells the story of tobacco, and the smoking habit of people through the ages. In the current era, Goofy (in his George Geef identity) is a chain smoker who decides to quit when he starts to get sick of it, but he constantly suffers from the desire to smoke. Other appearances: Narrator (voice)

=== 1952 ===
#	Title	Director	Release
33	Father's Lion	Jack Kinney	January 2, 1952
Goofy (in his identity as George Geef) takes his son hunting in the woods, where they begin to be stalked by Louie the Mountain Lion. Other appearances: Goofy Junior, Louie the Mountain Lion
34	Hello Aloha	Jack Kinney	February 19, 1952
Goofy (as George Geef) is stressed from his job, so he takes a vacation to an island paradise in Hawaii, where he decides to stay. Other appearances: Narrator (voice), Geef's Boss
35	Teachers Are People	Jack Kinney	April 6, 1952
The Narrator explains the events of any given day at a school, where the teacher, Goofy, has problems with George, one of his naughty students. Other appearances: Narrator (voice), George, Kids
36	Two-Gun Goofy	Jack Kinney	May 19, 1952
Pistol Pete wreaks havoc in the Old West. After Goofy inadvertently foils a heist of his on a stagecoach, Pete seeks revenge. In town, Pete begins chasing Goofy, who is hiding from him. Other appearances: Pete, Lady, Coffin Seller; cameo of Goofy Junior
37	Man's Best Friend	Jack Kinney	June 21, 1952
Goofy adopts a dog he names Bowser. The Narrator explains Goofy's different actions to train him, although the dog is still a troublemaker. Other appearances: Bowser, Narrator (voice)
38	Two Weeks Vacation	Jack Kinney	October 21, 1952
As he begins his vacation, Goofy goes on a road trip where he must soon have his car repaired. Also on his journey he has several unfortunate encounters with a caravan. During the night, he also has trouble finding an establishment where he can sleep. Other appearances: Narrator (voice), Mechanic
39	How to Be a Detective	Jack Kinney	December 12, 1952
Goofy (as "Johnny Eyeball") is a private detective who is asked by a lady to help her find Al. In addition to having the problem of not knowing who Al is, both a police officer (Pete) and a mugger (a Weasel) continually demand that he stay away from Al's case. Other appearances: Pete (as Al Muldoon), Weasel, Lady, Narrator (voice); cameo of Mickey Mouse in a magazine picture

=== 1953 ===
#	Title	Director	Release
40	Father's Day Off	Jack Kinney	March 28, 1953
Goofy (in his George Geef identity) takes care of the house while his wife is away, doing chores and taking care of their son. Soon, taking care of too many things at once begins to wreak havoc in the house. Other appearances: Goofy Junior, Mrs. Geef, Rover, Betty Jill; cameo of Pete
41	For Whom the Bulls Toil	Jack Kinney	May 9, 1953
Goofy arrives in Mexico, where after inadvertently dodging attacks from a fighting bull, the locals mistake him for a bullfighter. Therefore, they put him in the bullring, where Goofy constantly runs away from the bull. Other appearances: Narrator (voice), Bull
42	Father's Week-end	Jack Kinney	June 20, 1953
Goofy (as George Geef) tries to relax on a Sunday, but unable to sleep due to the constant noise, he decides to get out of bed. Later he continues trying to relax, but he must take Junior to the beach because he promised him. Once at the beach, Junior drags his father to the nearby carnival, where they enter various attractions. Other appearances: Goofy Junior, Mrs. Geef, Bowser
43	How to Dance	Jack Kinney	July 11, 1953
The Narrator uses Goofy as an example to explain how to dance. Other appearances: Narrator (voice)
44	How to Sleep	Jack Kinney	December 25, 1953
The Narrator explains how to sleep in different ways using Goofy as an example. When he has trouble sleeping one night, a scientist analyzes him to find the root of his problem. Other appearances: Narrator (voice), Scientist; cameos of Mrs. Geef, Geef's Boss, and Bruno from Cinderella

=== 2007 ===
#	Title	Director	Release
45	How to Hook Up Your Home Theater	Kevin Deters; Stevie Wermers	December 21, 2007
Goofy serves as an example of connecting a theater system at home, with the Narrator explaining the steps to follow. Other appearances: Narrator (voice); cameo of Pete

== The How-to Narrator ==
The How-to Narrator debuted in the 1940 short Goofy's Glider serving as a guide for Goofy, afterward becoming a stable character appearing in most of Goofy's short films, serving as a guide for Goofy's activities in the "How to..." shorts, or simply narrating Goofy's actions in other shorts. The Narrator is also present in other short films starring Goofy outside of the official Goofy series, including Californy'er Bust (1945), Aquamania (1961), Freewayphobia (1965), Goofy's Freeway Troubles (1965), and The Art of Vacationing (2012).

The Narrator has also appeared in other media related to Goofy, such as the television series Goof Troop (where he began to be credited as "The How-to Narrator"), where he has a recurring participation in situations similar to the "How To..." short films, in which he explains as a guide the actions of the characters.

The Narrator's hand in "Binge Watching"

In the television series Mickey Mouse Works and its spin-off House of Mouse, the Narrator serves as a guide for Goofy's actions in the cartoon shorts starring him, which are also presented under the "How To..." title, or are part of the "Goofy's Extreme Sports" series. In the main plot of the House of Mouse episode "Super Goof" (2002), the Narrator also explains the story about Goofy and his new superhero identity.

The Narrator is also present in the three episodes of How to Stay at Home (2021). In the episode "Binge Watching", it is possible to see him partially, with his hand briefly being seen waving at Goofy to see if he's still alive.

The Narrator has a brief participation in the special "The Wonderful Summer of Mickey Mouse" (2022) from the series The Wonderful World of Mickey Mouse, where he explains how to use a jet ski.

=== Voice actors ===
The Narrator has had several voice actors throughout his appearances, some shorts having uncredited actors. Known actors include:

Actor	Years	Voice appearances in the Goofy series
John McLeish	1940–1951	Goofy's Glider (1940), The Art of Skiing (1941), The Art of Self Defense (1941), The Olympic Champ (1942), How to Swim (1942), How to Fish (1942), How to Be a Sailor (1944), Goofy Gymnastics (1949), Motor Mania (1950), Home Made Home (1951)
Fred Shields	1942–1945	How to Play Baseball (1942), Victory Vehicles (1943), How to Play Golf (1944), Tiger Trouble (1945)
Frank Bull	1944, 1946	How to Play Football (1944), Double Dribble (1946)
Frank Graham	1945	African Diary (1945)
Doodles Weaver	1945, 1949	Hockey Homicide (1945), Tennis Racquet (1949)
John Brown	1946	A Knight for a Day (1946)
Harlow Wilcox	1948	They're Off (1948)
Jack Rourke	1951–1953	Cold War (1951), Tomorrow We Diet! (1951), Man's Best Friend (1952), How to Be a Detective (1952), Father's Week End (1953)
Alan Reed	1952	Teachers Are People (1952), Two Weeks Vacation (1952)
Art Gilmore	1953	How to Dance (1953), How to Sleep (1953)
Joaquin Garay	1953	For Whom the Bulls Toil (1953)
Corey Burton	2007	How to Hook Up Your Home Theater (2007)

John McLeish also voiced the Narrator in the short How to Ride a Horse included in the film The Reluctant Dragon (1941). Outside of the Goofy short film series, the Narrator is voiced by Cactus Mack in Californy'er Bust (1945), by John Dehner in Aquamania (1961), and by Paul Frees in Freewayphobia (1965) and Goofy's Freeway Troubles (1965). Corey Burton began voicing the Narrator in Goof Troop, after that becoming his permanent voice in his subsequent appearances in different media from 1992 to the present.

== Home media ==
The films have been released in various forms of home media, with selected films released on VHS, laserdisc, and DVD. Starting in 2010, some of the cartoons were made available on digital downloads.

So far, the only home media release of the entire series is on the two-disc DVD set "The Complete Goofy" (2002) from the "Walt Disney Treasures" collection, with the exception of How to Hook Up Your Home Theater, which was released later, and which was released in home media as part of the short films included in the Blu-ray Walt Disney Animation Studios Short Films Collection (2015).

Some cartoons were also included as unlockable content in the 2001 PlayStation game Goofy's Fun House.

== Legacy ==
In the television series Mickey Mouse Works (1999–2000), Goofy returned to star in several shorts under the title of "How to...", as part of the series' episodes, following the theme of the shorts of the Goofy series of showing the character in situations as a guide on how to do a specific action. These include: "How to Be a Waiter", "How to Be a Spy", "How to Ride a Bicycle", "How to Haunt a House", "How to Be a Baseball Fan", "How to Take Care of Your Yard", "How to Wash Dishes", and "How to Be a Gentleman". These shorts were reused in the spin-off series House of Mouse, which also included the shorts "How to Be Groovy, Cool, and Fly" and "How to Camp".

In 2012, The Art of Vacationing, a live-action short film starring Goofy, pays homage to Goofy's "The Art of..." and "How to..." shorts of the Goofy series, showing what would happen if Goofy planned a vacation to Disneyland Resort. Similar to the shorts in the Goofy series, it begins with a starburst with Goofy's face, but instead of an animated face, the face of Goofy's representation at the Disney Parks appears, followed by an introductory title which changes the "Walt Disney presents Goofy - Color by Technicolor" to "Disneyland Resort presents Goofy - Wondercolor".

The Goofy short films, specifically the "How to..." shorts, were followed up with How to Stay at Home (2021), a three-episode streaming series featuring Goofy showing how to do activities around his home during the COVID-19 pandemic.

== See also ==
- List of Walt Disney Animation Studios short films
  - Aquamania, a 1961 short film also starring Goofy
  - Once Upon a Studio, a 2023 short film with Goofy in a major role
- How to Stay at Home, another short film series starring Goofy
- Mickey Mouse (film series)
- Donald Duck (film series)
- Donald & Goofy
- Sport Goofy in Soccermania
- Goof Troop
- Mickey Mouse Works
