= Goof Troop =

American animated television series

- Also known as: Disney's Goof Troop
- Genre: Animated sitcom Slapstick
- Created by: Robert Taylor; Michael Peraza Jr.
- Based on: Goofy by Walt Disney; Art Babbitt; Frank Webb; Pinto Colvig
- Voices of: Bill Farmer; Dana Hill; Jim Cummings; April Winchell; Rob Paulsen; Nancy Cartwright; Frank Welker
- Theme music composer: Randy Petersen; Kevin Quinn; Robert Irving
- Opening theme: "Goof Troop" performed by Phil Perry
- Composer: Mark Watters
- Country of origin: United States
- Original language: English
- No. of seasons: 1
- No. of episodes: 78 + 1 special (list of episodes)

Production
- Producers: Roy Wilson; Hank Tucker; Ken Kessel
- Running time: 22 minutes
- Production companies: Walt Disney Television Animation (Note: Animation outsourced to Guimaraes Productions, Kennedy Cartoons, Moving Images International, Sunwoo Animation, Walt Disney Animation Australia, Walt Disney Animation France, Walt Disney Animation Japan and Wang Film Productions.); Walt Disney Television

Original release
- Network: Syndication (Note: 65 episodes, and "Have Yourself a Goofy Little Christmas", premiered in syndication.) (The Disney Afternoon)
- Release: September 7 – December 4, 1992
- Network: ABC (Note: 13 episodes premiered on ABC.)
- Release: September 12 – December 5, 1992

Related
- A Goofy Movie; An Extremely Goofy Movie

Goof Troop is an American animated sitcom produced by Walt Disney Television Animation. The series focuses on the relationship between single-father Goofy and his son, Max, as well as their neighbor Pete and his family. Created by Robert Taylor and Michael Peraza Jr., the main-series of 65 episodes aired in first-run-syndication from 1992 to 1993 on The Disney Afternoon programming block, while an additional thirteen episodes aired on Saturday mornings on ABC. A Christmas special was also produced and aired in syndication in late 1992.

Walt Disney Pictures produced two standalone spin-off films from the television series: the theatrical A Goofy Movie, released on April 7, 1995, and its direct-to-video sequel An Extremely Goofy Movie, released on February 29, 2000.

== Premise ==
Goofy, a single-father, moves back to his hometown of Spoonerville with his son, Max, and they end up moving in next door to his high school friend Pete, a used-car-salesman and owner of Honest Pete's Used Cars; Pete's wife Peg, a real estate agent; and their two children; their son P.J. (Pete Jr.) and daughter Pistol. Max and P.J. quickly become best friends and do practically everything together. Much of the show's humor comes from Max's normal personality, which contrasts with his father's, while Pete is repeatedly neuroticized by Goofy's presence as a bad neighbor.

== Voice cast ==
=== Main ===
- Bill Farmer as Goofy, Mayor Baba ("In Goof We Trust" and "Window Pains"), Dr. Frankengoof
- Dana Hill as Maximilian "Max" Goof
- Jim Cummings as Pete, King Richard the Chicken-Hearted, Sir Reginald, Toynbee, Frankengoof Monster, Mr. Braxton
- April Winchell as Peg, Danielle Wrathmaker
- Rob Paulsen as P.J., Biff Fuddled, Leech, Snibbs
- Nancy Cartwright as Pistol, Melvin
- Frank Welker as Waffles, Chainsaw, Earl of Earl's Auto, Chief of Police, Mayor Baba ("Inspector Goofy"), Giblet, Prince Freddy, Sparky, Dr. Watson, Isadore Eyesore

=== Additional ===
- Corey Burton as the How-to Narrator, Circus Ringmaster
- Jerry Houser as Spud
- Pat Fraley as Wally
- William Windom as Brigadier General Robert E. Lee Sparrowhawk
- Joe Piscopo as Tan Roadster
- Patrick Duffy as Harold Hatchback
- Conor Duffy as Coop Hatchback
- S. Scott Bullock as Tooth
- Candi Milo as Nails
- Charles Nelson Reilly as Dutch Spackle ("Unreal Estate")
- Michael Bell as Dutch Spackle ("A Pizza the Action")
- Jennifer Darling as Bubbles
- Michael Gough as Fester
- Kath Soucie as Debbie
- Jerry Houser as Duke
- Gary Owens as Mr. Hammerhead
- Andrea Martin as Mrs. Willoughby
- Tino Insana as Colonel Carter
- Joe Piscopo as Tan Roadster, Myron "The Incredible Bulk" Brogan
- Charlie Adler as Magician's hat, Igor, Street Theatre Teacher, Moe
- Dorian Harewood as Buster
- Eddie Deezen as Road Hogs Biker
- Richard Karron as S. Slick
- Susan Tolsky as Miss Pennypacker
- Brenda Vaccaro as Gilda
- Dan Castellaneta as the Baseball Coach

== Episodes ==
Season	Episodes	Originally released		
Season	Episodes	First released	Last released	Network
The Disney Afternoon	65	September 7, 1992	December 4, 1992	Syndication
ABC	13	September 12, 1992	December 5, 1992	ABC
Special	1	November 26, 1992		Syndication
Films	2	April 7, 1995	February 29, 2000	—N/a

== Promotion and releases ==
=== Marketing ===
In June 1992, Buena Vista Television signed a deal with Kellogg's, Burger King, Pacific Theatres, and an unknown retailer to promote Goof Troop with a "Get Goofy" campaign valued at $100 million. From July to September, Kellogg's cereals included figurine giveaways featuring characters from the series. In October, Burger King promoted Goof Troop premium coupons, Burger King Kids Club displays, and other material. Pacific Theatres offered Goof Troop collector's cup giveaways. Starting on January 22, 1993, Pizza Hut promoted a Kid's Pizza Pack meal that offered Goof Wear as a premium and a personal pan pizza and beverage with one item, including a T-shirt, a legionnaire cap, a wrist band, and shoelaces.

=== Broadcast ===
Goof Troop was initially previewed on The Disney Channel. Goof Troop was previewed in syndication in September 1992 with a two-hour television special. (Note: Airing dates vary in syndicated markets. Here are a few examples.: Olathe News listed the air date as September 4 in the market located at Olathe.; Fort Worth Star-Telegram listed it as September 6 in the market located at Fort Worth.; The Houston Post listed it as September 7 in the market located at Houston.) The series officially started to air regular episodes on September 7 on The Disney Afternoon programming block. Five days later, it debuted as a Saturday-morning cartoon on ABC. In February 1993, Disney announced that Goof Troop would not be renewed for a second season due to a failure of network license fees and rising production costs.

Reruns of the series later aired on The Disney Channel starting on September 3, 1996, and later on sister cable channel Toon Disney, with reruns airing on it until January 2005. The program returned from September 2006 until August 2008, with the Christmas special airing in December in the United States.

=== Home media and streaming ===
In February 1993, Disney released three volumes of the series on VHS in the United States: Banding Together!, Goin' Fishin'!, and The Race Is On!. With the exception of the episode "Counterfeit Goof", the series is available in HD for purchase on Amazon Prime Video and Google Play. The series has been available to stream on Disney+ since its launch on November 12, 2019.

== Reception ==
=== Ratings ===
Goof Troop's debut on The Disney Afternoon block in syndication received a 3.9 Nielsen rating. On September 10, 1992, Goof Troop was tied with Fox Kids's Batman: The Animated Series with a 4.3 Nielsen rating, but surpassed the ratings of Batman: The Animated Series in seven out of thirteen metered markets. On average, Goof Troop received a 3.9 Nielsen rating on a four-day period as of September 1992. By October 26, it became the highest rated series of the week for children aged two to eleven, receiving a 6.6 Nielsen rating. Receiving a 9.1 Nielsen rating for children aged two to eleven by April 5, 1993, it was Disney's most-popular show and the second-most-popular weekly children's show.

=== Accolades ===
Award	Date of ceremony	Category	Nominee(s)	Result	Ref.
Annie Awards	1993	Voice Acting in the Field of Animation	Jim Cummings as the voice of Pete	Won	
Daytime Emmy Awards	May 26, 1993	Outstanding Writing in an Animated Program	Karl Geurs and Bruce Talkington	Nominated	
Daytime Emmy Awards	May 26, 1993	Outstanding Music Direction and Composition	Mark Watters for Goof Troop Christmas	Nominated	
Daytime Emmy Awards	May 26, 1993	Outstanding Film Sound Mixing	Timothy J. Borquez and Timothy J. Garrity	Nominated	

== Legacy ==
Goof Troop has had a lasting impact on Goofy and Pete's careers, as their later appearances throughout the 1990s to the mid-2000s were built on the show's status quo. These include A Goofy Movie, Mickey's Once Upon a Christmas, An Extremely Goofy Movie, House of Mouse, and Mickey's Twice Upon a Christmas, all of which feature Goofy and/or Pete's respective families as characters. Goofy and Pete also appeared on Bonkers and Raw Toonage in their Goof Troop designs.

In the DuckTales reboot series's premiere episode, Spoonerville is mentioned amongst a number of locations that McDuck Enterprises conducts business in. In the season three episode "Quack Pack!", Goofy makes an appearance in his Goof Troop design. In addition, Max and P.J. appear in photos in the episode.

In 2023, new photos were added to the inside of Goofy's house in the refurbished Mickey's Toontown area of Disneyland. The photos now include pictures of Goofy and Max, a picture of Pete with his family, and a picture of Max with P.J. and Pistol. There is also now a height chart for Goofy and Max on a doorway frame in the house.

== Franchise ==
=== Films ===
Two films based on Goof Troop were released. In the early 1990s, former Disney chairman Jeffrey Katzenberg commissioned A Goofy Movie, suggesting the storyline inspired by a planned car trip with his daughter to Goof Troop's story supervisor Jymn Magon. Suggesting to make a movie about teenagers, Magon thought it would be an interesting idea for the story of Goofy and Max. Premiering on April 5, 1995, at the AMC Pleasure Island at Walt Disney World Resort in Lake Buena Vista, the film was widely released two days later in the United States. The second film, An Extremely Goofy Movie, was released on DVD and VHS on February 29, 2000.

=== Video game ===
A video game based on the series was released for the Super Nintendo Entertainment System in July 1993.
