= Disney's Extremely Goofy Skateboarding =

2001 video game

- Developer: Krome Studios
- Publisher: Disney Interactive
- Director: Steve Stamatiadis
- Producers: Mary Jo LaRoche; Robert Watson
- Designer: Robert Watson
- Programmer: Daniel Krenn
- Artists: Christopher Tellez; Andrew Clark
- Composer: Jack Wall
- Platform: Microsoft Windows
- Release: NA: September 18, 2001; EU: June 6, 2003
- Genre: Sports
- Mode: Single-player

Disney's Extremely Goofy Skateboarding is a 2001 skateboarding video game developed by Krome Studios released in September 2001 for PC. Players are able to play as either Goofy (voiced by Bill Farmer) or Max Goof (voiced by Jason Marsden) from the Disney animated TV series Goof Troop. Players can skateboard through four "worlds", which consist of three levels each.

The soundtrack for the game was devised by composer Jack Wall in early 2001.

== Gameplay ==
There are several modes which comprise the game, including shred session, tech session and other various tutorial modes. The player is able to play as Goofy or Max. There are also tutorials showing how to perform a trick. While playing the tutorial or the levels, Goofy or Max will provide commentary. The game features four worlds. Each world has three levels or locations. A key is required to pass into the next level. The player is able to choose a skateboard before beginning the gameplay. Each level has two objectives completing an objective will reward the player a key. Points will be rewarded for certain tricks performed. Some of the tricks are 50/50, nosegrind, unbelievable, kickflip, etc.

== Release ==
For a limited time, a free demo CD-ROM entitled Disney's Extremely Goofy Skateboarding Preview was included with boxes of Kellogg's cereals. This demo included one level and several tutorials on how to land the tricks. Furthermore, packages of Perdue Dinosaur Chicken Nuggets included offers where buyers received a free full version of the game on CD-ROM.
