= Tony Anselmo =

American voice actor and animator (born 1960)

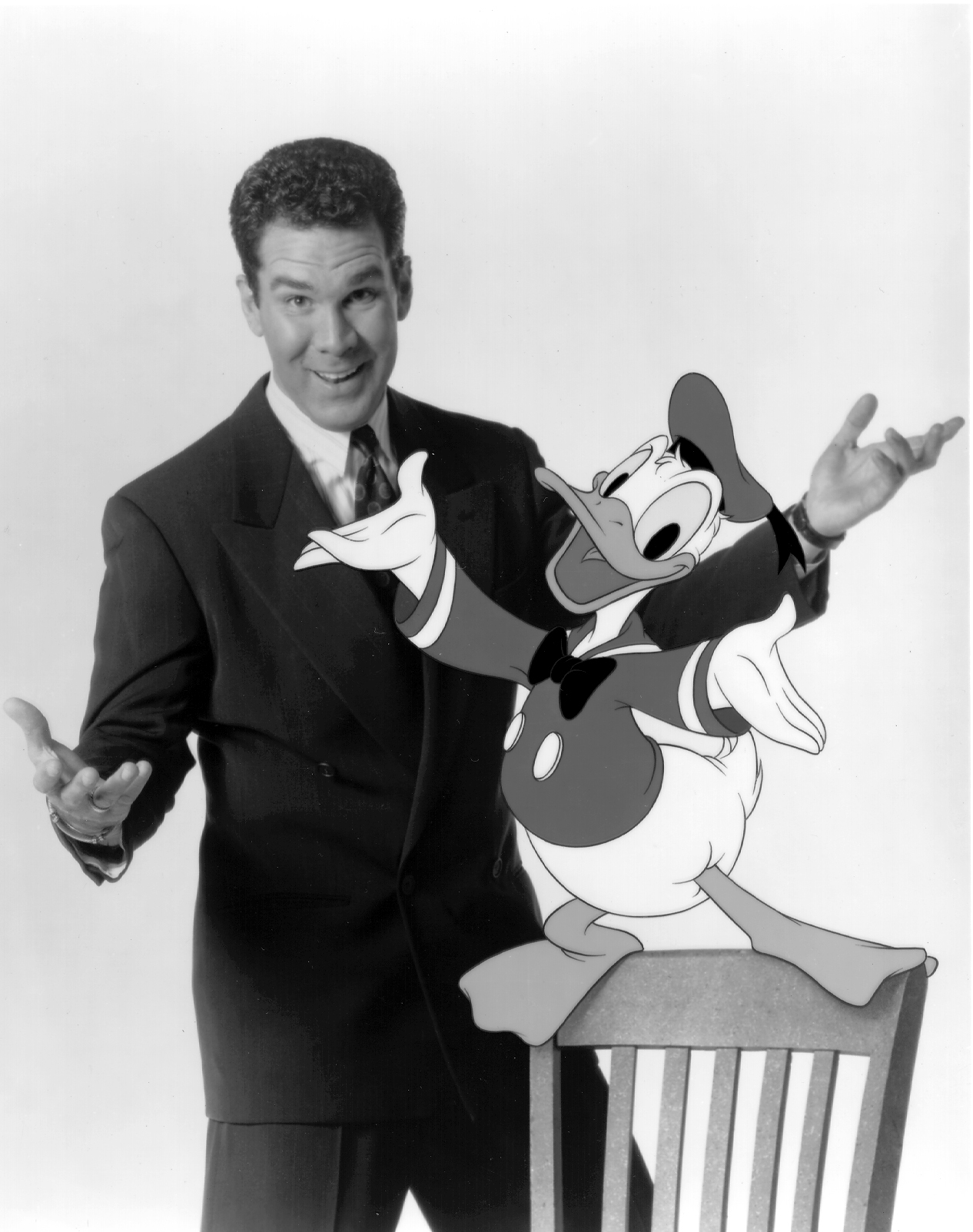
- Anselmo with Donald Duck in 1998
- Born: February 18, 1960 (age 66); Salt Lake City, Utah, U.S.
- Education: California Institute of the Arts
- Occupations: Voice actor; animator
- Years active: 1980–present

Tony Anselmo (born February 18, 1960) is an American voice actor and animator. He has been the official character voice of Donald Duck since 1985 following the death of the original voice actor, Clarence Nash. He has also provided voices for Donald's triplet nephews, Huey, Dewey, and Louie, and his girlfriend, Daisy Duck.

Prior to voicing for Disney projects, he became an animator for the company in 1980. As of 2023, he has been credited in 23 animation roles. Anselmo was inducted as a Disney Legend in 2009 for his decades of contribution to animation and the character of Donald Duck.

== Early life and education ==
Anselmo was born on February 18, 1960, in Salt Lake City, Utah.

Anselmo formed an early interest with Disney after attending a screening of Mary Poppins at the age of four. Anselmo said, "I remember leaving the theater and asking, 'How did they do this? Who did that?' and so on...So a seed was planted there, and from that time on I never wanted to be a fireman, an astronaut, or anything else. I wanted to work for Disney."

Anselmo's family moved to Sunnyvale in northern California when he was seven, and he continued to actively study Disney and animation. He began drawing, using the famed Preston Blair art book, Advanced Animation, built a light table of his own, and began creating animation with a Super 8 camera.

He attended Marian A. Peterson High School in Sunnyvale, California. He began night art classes at local colleges and began a regular correspondence with the artists who animated the Disney films, including Frank Thomas, Ollie Johnston, Eric Larson, and Milt Kahl. Anselmo stated, "Ollie wrote a lot and sent me drawings, advising me to learn quick sketch, life drawing, and design."

Anselmo studied at the Character Animation Department of California Institute of the Arts on a full scholarship from the Disney Family in fall 1978. The department head was Jack Hannah, director of the Donald Duck unit under Walt Disney. Anselmo's other teachers included Disney veterans T. Hee, Ken O'Connor, Elmer Plummer, and Bill Moore.

== Career ==
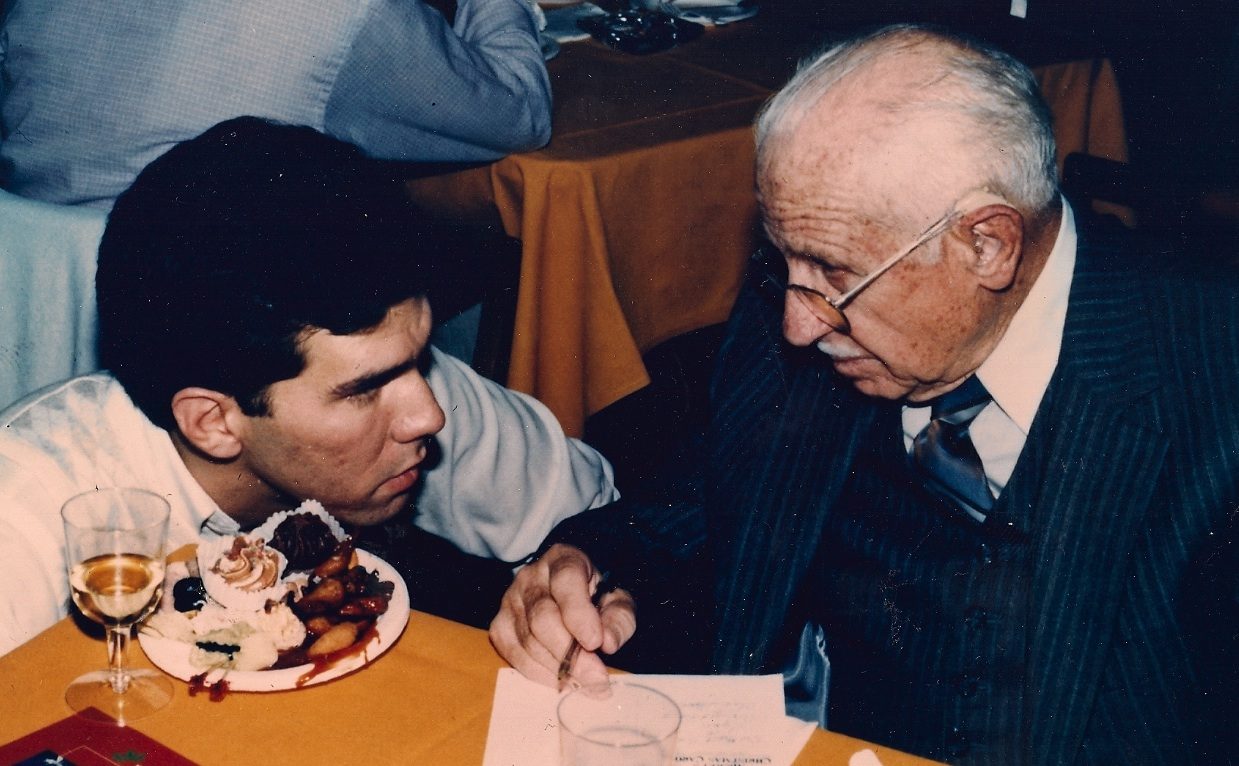
Tony Anselmo and Clarence Nash, 1980s

Anselmo's career as an animator began in 1980, at age 20. In subsequent years, Anselmo contributed to the animation of 20 Disney animated features, including The Black Cauldron, The Little Mermaid, Beauty and the Beast, The Lion King, Tarzan and The Emperor's New Groove. Anselmo was trained and mentored by the original voice of Donald, Clarence Nash, who died in 1985 and Anselmo inherited the role of Donald Duck just as Nash had wished. He first voiced Donald on a 1986 D-TV Valentine special on The Disney Channel.

Walt Disney insisted on character consistency and integrity. As long as Clarence Nash was alive no one other than Nash was permitted to provide Donald's voice. Continuing in that tradition, in 1988, Michael Eisner and Roy E. Disney created the department of Disney Character Voices to ensure the continuation of character integrity, consistency, and quality in recording methods.

During an interview, Anselmo stated that "Most people believe that Donald's voice is done squeezing air through the cheek, that is not true. I can't reveal how it's actually done, but it is definitely not done by squeezing air through the cheek. The Hanna-Barbera character 'Yakky Doodle' is done that way. Donald Duck is not."

Anselmo is the only person to both animate, and voice Donald Duck in Mickey Donald Goofy: The Three Musketeers, Funny You Don't Look 200, and The Prince and the Pauper.

He has voiced the nephews on the TV special Down and Out With Donald Duck (in which he also voiced Daisy Duck) and the shows Mickey Mouse Works and House of Mouse (while Russi Taylor (the voice of Minnie Mouse) voiced the nephews in DuckTales, Mickey's Once and Twice Upon a Christmas, Mickey's Speedway USA and the remastered DuckTales video game in 2013). He also lent his voice to minor characters in The Great Mouse Detective, Mickey's Around the World in 80 Days and Phineas and Ferb.

Anselmo has also worked as a voice actor for the Kingdom Hearts series, which features Donald Duck as one of three main characters. He also provided the voice of Donald in the video game Kinect Disneyland Adventures in 2011.

=== Honors and acclaim ===
Anselmo has been honored with several awards and nominations. He was a winner of the 2014 BTVA Television Voice Acting Award for Best Vocal Ensemble in a Television Series — Children's/Educational for Mickey Mouse Clubhouse, as well as the BTVA Video Game Voice Acting Award for Best Vocal Ensemble in a Video Game - Kingdom Hearts 3D: Dream Drop Distance.

In September 2009, Tony Anselmo was named a Disney Legend by Roy E. Disney.

Anselmo began collecting Disney merchandise at an early age, and is known for his comprehensive collection of Disney posters relating to the works of Walt Disney. This expertise resulted in a 2002 art book, The Disney Poster Book: Featuring the Collection of Tony Anselmo. Anselmo's collection was used in exhibits at The Walt Disney Family Museum in San Francisco.

== Filmography ==
=== Film ===
List of voice performances in feature and direct-to-video films
Year	Title	Role	Notes
1986	The Great Mouse Detective	Thug Guard No. 3	
1987	Down and Out with Donald Duck	Donald Duck, Daisy Duck, Huey, Dewey, Louie	
1988	Who Framed Roger Rabbit	Donald Duck	
1990	The Prince and the Pauper	Donald Duck	
1990	Disney Sing-Along Songs: Disneyland Fun	Donald Duck	Direct-to-video
1994–1995	Mickey's Fun Songs series	Donald Duck	Direct-to-video series
1998	The Spirit of Mickey	Donald Duck	Direct-to-video film
1999	Mickey's Once Upon a Christmas	Donald Duck	Direct-to-video film
1999	Fantasia 2000	Donald Duck	
2001	Mickey's Magical Christmas: Snowed in at the House of Mouse	Donald Duck, Huey, Dewey, Louie	Direct-to-video film
2002	Mickey's House of Villains	Donald Duck, Huey, Dewey, Louie	Direct-to-video film
2004	The Lion King 1½	Donald Duck	Direct-to-video film
2004	Mickey, Donald, Goofy: The Three Musketeers	Donald Duck	Nominated - Annie Award for Voice Acting in a Feature Production; Direct-to-video film
2004	Mickey's Twice Upon a Christmas	Donald Duck	Direct-to-video film
2023	Once Upon a Studio	Donald Duck	Short film

=== Television ===
List of voice performances in animated shows
Year	Title	Role	Notes
1986	The Real Ghostbusters	The Mayor of Morrisville	1 episode
1986	D-TV Valentine	Donald Duck	Television special
1987–1988	DuckTales	Donald Duck	8 episodes
1988	Totally Minnie	Donald Duck	Television special
1988	Mickey's 60th Birthday	Donald Duck	Television special
1989–1990	Walt Disney's Wonderful World of Color	Donald Duck	
1993	Bonkers	Donald Duck	Episode: "Going Bonkers"
1995	Gargoyles	Additional voices	
1996	Quack Pack	Donald Duck	39 episodes
1999–2000	Mickey Mouse Works	Donald Duck, Huey, Dewey, Louie	31 episodes
2001–2003	House of Mouse	Donald Duck, Huey, Dewey, Louie	48 episodes
2006–2016	Mickey Mouse Clubhouse	Donald Duck	122 episodes
2011	Phineas and Ferb	Additional voices	Episode: "Mommy Can You Hear Me?/Road Trip"
2012–2016	Minnie's Bow-Toons	Donald Duck	40 episodes
2013	Wheel of Fortune: Making Disney Memories Week	Donald Duck	
2013–2019	Mickey Mouse	Donald Duck	38 episodes
2016	Duck the Halls: A Mickey Mouse Christmas Special	Donald Duck	Television special
2017	The Scariest Story Ever: A Mickey Mouse Halloween Spooktacular	Donald Duck	Television special
2017–2021	DuckTales	Donald Duck	Main cast
2018	Legend of the Three Caballeros	Donald Duck	Main cast
2020–2023	The Wonderful World of Mickey Mouse	Donald Duck	Main cast
2021–2025	Mickey Mouse Funhouse	Donald Duck	Main cast
2025–present	Mickey Mouse Clubhouse+	Donald Duck	Main cast

=== Video games ===
List of voice performances in video games
Year	Title	Role	Notes
1997	Disney's Magic Artist	Donald Duck	
2000	Mickey's Speedway USA	Donald Duck	
2000	Donald Duck: Goin' Quackers	Donald Duck	
2000	Mickey Mouse Preschool	Donald Duck	
2000	Mickey Mouse Kindergarten	Donald Duck	
2000	Mickey Mouse Toddler	Donald Duck	
2002	Kingdom Hearts	Donald Duck	
2002	Disney Golf	Donald Duck	
2002	Disney's PK: Out of the Shadows	Donald Duck	
2002	Disney Sports Soccer	Donald Duck	
2002	Disney Sports Skateboarding	Donald Duck	
2002	Disney Sports Football	Donald Duck	
2002	Disney Sports Basketball	Donald Duck	
2003	Disney's Party	Donald Duck	
2003	Toontown Online	Donald Duck	
2006	Kingdom Hearts II	Donald Duck	
2008	Disney Think Fast	Donald Duck	
2008	Kingdom Hearts Re: Chain of Memories	Donald Duck	
2009	Kingdom Hearts 358/2 Days	Donald Duck	
2010	Epic Mickey	Donald Duck	
2010	Kingdom Hearts: Birth by Sleep	Donald Duck	
2011	Kinect Disneyland Adventures	Donald Duck	
2011	Kingdom Hearts Re:coded	Donald Duck	
2012	Epic Mickey 2: The Power of Two	Donald Duck	
2012	Epic Mickey: Power of Illusion	Donald Duck	
2012	Kingdom Hearts 3D: Dream Drop Distance	Donald Duck	
2014	Disney Magical World	Donald Duck	
2014	Disney Infinity 2.0	Donald Duck	
2014	Kingdom Hearts HD 2.5 Remix	Donald Duck	
2015	Disney Infinity 3.0	Donald Duck	
2017	Kingdom Hearts HD 2.8 Final Chapter Prologue	Donald Duck	
2019	Kingdom Hearts III	Donald Duck	
2020	Kingdom Hearts: Melody of Memory	Donald Duck	
2021	Cookie Run: Kingdom	Cookie Donald Duck	
2022	Disney Dreamlight Valley	Donald Duck	
2023	Disney Illusion Island	Donald Duck	
2023	Disney Speedstorm	Donald Duck	

=== Web series ===
List of voice performances in Web shows
Year	Title	Role	Note
2024	Hot Ones	Donald Duck	Episode: "Donald Duck Tries to Keep His Cool While Eating Spicy Wings"

=== Theme park attractions ===
Year	Title	Role
1993	Mickey's Movie Barn	Donald Duck
2002	Animagique	Donald Duck
2003	Mickey's PhilharMagic	Donald Duck
2007	Gran Fiesta Tour Starring The Three Caballeros	Donald Duck
2020	Mickey & Minnie's Runaway Railway	Donald Duck

== Animator ==
Year	Film	Animation	Characters
1985	The Black Cauldron	Assistant Animator	
1986	The Great Mouse Detective	Key Assistant Animator	
1988	Oliver & Company	Animating Assistant	
1989	The Little Mermaid	Character Animator	
1990	The Prince and the Pauper (Short)	Character Animator	
1991	Beauty and the Beast	Animator	Wardrobe
1992	Aladdin	Assistant Animator	Jasmine
1994	The Lion King	Key Assistant Animator	Additional Young Simba and Miscellaneous Characters
1995	Pocahontas	Key Assistant Animator	Flit
1996	The Hunchback of Notre Dame	Associate Lead Key Assistant Clean-Up Animator	Gypsies, Guards and Others
1997	Hercules	Key Assistant Animator: Additional Clean-Up Animation	
1998	Mulan	Additional Key Assistant Clean-Up Animator	
1999	Tarzan	Lead Key Assistant Animator	Professor Archimedes Quincy Porter
1999	Fantasia 2000	Key Assistant Animator / Additional Animator	
2000	The Emperor's New Groove	Key Assistant Animator	Pacha
2002	Treasure Planet	Key Assistant Animator	Sarah Hawkins and Miscellaneous Characters
2004	Home on the Range	Key Assistant Animator	Miscellaneous Characters
2004	Mickey, Donald, Goofy: The Three Musketeers (Video)	Animation Clean-Up / Key Clean-Up Artist	Donald Duck
2005	Pooh's Heffalump Movie	Clean-Up Artist	
2006–07	Mickey Mouse Clubhouse	Storyboard Revisionist / Prop Designer	Episodes: "A Surprise for Minnie", "Mickey's Great Clubhouse Hunt"
2008	The Replacements	Storyboard Revisionist	Episode: "Tasumi Unmasked"
2010	Kick Buttowski: Suburban Daredevil	Prop Designer	Episode: "Mellowbrook Drift"/"The Gift of Wacky"

== Awards and nominations ==
Awards and nominations
Year	Award	Category	Title	Result
2005	Annie Awards	Voice Acting in an Animated Feature Production	Mickey, Donald, Goofy: The Three Musketeers	Nominated
2009	Disney Legend Award	Animation — Voice		Won
2009	Behind the Voice Actors Television Voice Acting Award	Best Vocal Ensemble in a Television Series — Children's/Educational	Mickey Mouse Clubhouse	Nominated
2014	Behind the Voice Actors People's Choice Voice Acting Award	Best Male Vocal Performance in a Television Series — Children's/Educational	Mickey Mouse Clubhouse	Nominated
2014	Behind the Voice Actors People's Choice Voice Acting Award	Best Vocal Ensemble in a Television Series — Children's/Educational	Mickey Mouse Clubhouse	Nominated
2015	Behind the Voice Actors People's Choice Voice Acting Award	Best Vocal Ensemble in a Television Series — Children's/Educational	Mickey Mouse Clubhouse	Nominated
2015	Behind the Voice Actors People's Choice Voice Acting Award	Best Male Vocal Performance in a Television Series — Children's/Educational	Mickey Mouse Clubhouse	Nominated
2018	Behind the Voice Actors People's Choice Voice Acting Award	Best Vocal Ensemble in a New Television Series	DuckTales	Nominated
2018	Behind the Voice Actors People's Choice Voice Acting Award	Best Vocal Ensemble in a New Television Series	DuckTales	Won

Preceded by Clarence Nash	Voice of Donald Duck; 1985–present	Succeeded by Incumbent
