= Goofy and Wilbur =

- Original theatrical poster
- Directed by: Dick Huemer
- Story by: Otto Englander
- Produced by: Walt Disney
- Starring: Jack Bailey
- Music by: Paul J. Smith
- Animation by: Art Babbitt; Izzy Klein; Ed Love; Wolfgang Reitherman; Bernard Wolf
- Production company: Walt Disney Productions
- Distributed by: RKO Radio Pictures
- Release date: March 17, 1939
- Running time: 8:05
- Language: English

Goofy and Wilbur is an animated cartoon short produced by Walt Disney Productions and released by RKO Radio Pictures on March 17, 1939. Although the cartoon is billed as a Mickey Mouse cartoon (as said on the theatrical poster), it was the first cartoon which featured Goofy in a solo role without Mickey Mouse and/or Donald Duck.

In this cartoon Goofy goes fishing with his pet grasshopper, Wilbur, only for persistent bad luck to befall the duo.

== Plot ==
Goofy is out fishing in a small beaten boat with a sputtering motor, and stops when he comes across a sign that says “No Fishing.” He opens up a box, and out leaps his grasshopper friend Wilbur, landing on his finger. Goofy strokes Wilbur like a pet, and asks if he’s all set, to which Wilbur sticks out his chest proudly. Giving Goofy a wave, Wilbur gently dives into the water, but is able to walk across the surface with his feet and look for fish to catch. Goofy sits in his boat and hollers out to the fish, hitting a horseshoe with a stick to get their attention.

A fish wakes up to see Wilbur, and begins to chase the grasshopper while Goofy stays hidden in the boat, sticking out his net cautiously. Wilbur is able to jump through the holes in the netting while the fish gets caught. Wilbur goes out again to get another victim, this time splashing water in the fish’s face. Angered by this, the fish swims at full force to catch the grasshopper, but Wilbur is too fast. Unfortunately, Wilbur is so busy taunting his victim that he doesn’t see another fish lurking near the boat who thinks Wilbur would make a tasty snack. Caught between two fish, Wilbur jumps straight into the air, with one fish almost devouring the other one. Goofy catches both in his net, and asks Wilbur to bring back a big fat fish next. Wilbur jumps excitedly as a big fat fish follows him back to the boat, although the poor fish is too big to fit into the net. However, Goofy is able to catch him all the same.

Wilbur skates around on the surface of the water, noticing a fish in front of him that, unbeknownst to him, is pretending to be asleep. Wilbur tries to get its attention, but the moment he stops watching to think about how to get the fish to wake up, the fish turns around and nearly eats him. Fortunately, Wilbur turns around at the last second, causing the fish to resume its fake sleep. Wilbur then begins to dance for the fish, hoping this will do the trick. Finally, annoyed, Wilbur spits in its eye, causing it to run after Wilbur at full speed. Goofy, meanwhile, is still trying to get the fat fish out of his net. He slams the fish in, but the fish take the netting with it, and when Goofy tries to save Wilbur with the net, the fish dives through the now netting-free net, with Wilbur scrambling to get to safety on the boat. The fish throws itself at the side of the boat, catching Wilbur as it stays suctioned fast.

Alarmed, Goofy pulls off the fish and starts calling out for Wilbur, who is still inside the fish. Goofy can hear Wilbur’s call, but it seems that he is unable to get out. Goofy finally slaps the fish, causing a very blue Wilbur to fall onto his knee, unable to move. Goofy is worried sick, wondering what can he do. Using Wilbur’s legs, Goofy pumps out all the water inside Wilbur, and revives him with smelling salts, although the poor creature is still woozy from his adventure. Goofy warns Wilbur that the fish are getting wise to him, to which Wilbur is suddenly fully revived and ready to attack.

Leaping into the water, Wilbur sends out a massive call to all the fish in the area, and they respond, circling the poor insect. A great chase ensues, but Wilbur is able to keep one step ahead of the fish – until he finds himself to be the snack of a toad. Goofy, having seen everything, cries out Wilbur’s name, horrified, and runs out to save his friend. The toad manages to get away from Goofy – but finds itself to be the snack of a stork. The stork begins to run away as it sees Goofy in pursuit, and lands safely in its nest at the top of a hollow tree. Wasting no time, Goofy climbs up the insides of the tree and tries to battle the stork to get his friend back. The stork flies away angrily, leaving its egg behind, and Goofy begins to cry, mourning the loss of his friend. Fortunately, the egg hatches, revealing a not-dead Wilbur. The two celebrate, with Wilbur giving his friend a huge hug and a kiss.

== Reception ==
The Film Daily wrote: "Wilbur, the grasshopper, is a new character among Disney creations, and will immediately have millions of cheering fans.. The affection between him and his master, Goofy, is something beautiful to behold... The characterization of Wilbur is so real, that one seems to have known him a long time. All Disney followers will welcome him."

== Voice cast ==
- Goofy: Jack Bailey

== Releases ==
- c. 1939 - original theatrical release
- c. 1956 - Disneyland, episode #2.22: "On Vacation" (TV)
- c. 1977 - Donald Duck's Summer Magic (theatrical)
- c. 1983 - Good Morning, Mickey!, episode #59 (TV)
- c. 1989 - Turner & Hooch (Australian theatrical re-release)
- c. 1992 - Mickey's Mouse Tracks, episode #46 (TV)
- c. 1992 - Donald's Quack Attack, episode #32 (TV)
- c. 1997 - The Ink and Paint Club, episode #1.25: "Goofy Goofs Around" (TV)

== Home media ==
The short was released on December 2, 2002 on Walt Disney Treasures: The Complete Goofy. It was released to Disney+ on August 11, 2023.

Additional releases include:

- c. 1981 - "Mickey Mouse and Donald Duck Cartoon Collections Volume Two" (laserdisc)
- c. 2006 - "Walt Disney's Funny Factory with Goofy" (DVD)
- c. 2006 - The Fox and the Hound 2 (DVD; special feature)
