= How to Stay at Home =

Series of hand-drawn animated short films by Walt Disney Animation Shorts

- Promotional poster
- Directed by: Eric Goldberg
- Written by: Eric Goldberg
- Starring: Bill Farmer
- Production company: Walt Disney Animation Studios
- Distributed by: Disney Platform Distribution (Disney+)
- Release date: August 11, 2021
- Running time: 3-6 minutes
- Language: English

How to Stay at Home is an American animated series of short films written and directed by Eric Goldberg and produced by Walt Disney Animation Studios. The series stars Bill Farmer with narration from Corey Burton and centers on Goofy as he is forced to stay in his home due to the COVID-19 pandemic. The three shorts were released on August 11, 2021, on Disney+.

== Synopsis ==
Told in the style of the classic How to... short series, the series follows Goofy's life in his home during the COVID-19 pandemic.

== Cast ==
- Bill Farmer as Goofy
- Corey Burton as The Narrator

== Episodes ==
No.	Title	Original release date
1	"How to Wear a Mask"	August 11, 2021
Goofy tries to wear a mask in order to leave his house, but ends up entangled in it.
2	"Learning to Cook"	August 11, 2021
Goofy causes a disaster while trying to create a new and unique meal.
3	"Binge Watching"	August 11, 2021
Goofy takes care of multiple tasks while binge-watching his favorite show.

== Production ==
=== Development ===
During Fall 2020, animator Eric Goldberg pitched to Walt Disney Animation Studios chief creative officer Jennifer Lee and president Clark Spencer a series of shorts starring Goofy that centered on his life during the COVID-19 pandemic in the spirit of his How to... shorts, having been personally fond of the character. Lee and Spencer felt that Goofy's "everyman" persona was perfect to showcase regular life during the pandemic. The series was announced in July 2021, with Goldberg set to direct and Dorothy McKim set to produce. Bill Farmer and Corey Burton reprise their roles from previous Disney media as Goofy and The Narrator. In addition to the three initial shorts, Goldberg pitched to Lee several additional ideas for How to Stay at Home shorts.

=== Animation ===
Contrary to most modern Walt Disney Animation Studios productions, the series was made with hand-drawn animation. Each short had a different supervising animator; Goldberg was the supervising animator for How to Wear a Mask, Randy Haycock for Learning to Cook and Mark Henn for Binge Watching. Goldberg choose to animate How to Wear a Mask due to the short's use of physical humor, which he always was personally fond of. McKim assembled a 10-people team for the series. Due to the pandemic, the shorts were remotely produced, with technical director Brandon Bloch delivering scenes personally to the animators' homes after receiving them at Goldberg's home. While the shorts were inspired by the How to... Goofy shorts directed by Jack Kinney, the animators didn't want them to "feel like it came directly from 1942", so background artist Lureline Weatherly made backgrounds more detailed than those of the original shorts and Goofy was given a thicker outline in order for the animation to feel modern, while also evoking the original shorts.

=== Music and sound ===
The short series utilizes several sounds created by Jimmy McDonald for the original How to... shorts. The sounds were selected according to Goldberg's preference, while McKim obtained the rights to use them.

== Release ==
The three shorts of the How to Stay at Home series were released on Disney+, on August 11, 2021.
