= Goofy's Fun House =

2001 video game

- North American cover art
- Developer: The Code Monkeys
- Publishers: NA: NewKidCo; EU: Ubi Soft
- Platform: PlayStation
- Release: NA: June 28, 2001; EU: December 7, 2001
- Genre: Platform
- Mode: Single-player

Goofy's Fun House is a 2001 platform game released for the PlayStation by NewKidCo. It focuses on the Disney character Goofy.

== Gameplay ==
Goofy in the backyard area of the house. Thirteen film canisters and six eggs have been collected.

Goofy must explore each part of his home, which consists of 15 distinct rooms. Each room includes elements that the player can interact with, such as a blender in the kitchen or table saw in the garage. The main focus of play centers around finding 60 film canisters and other objects which Goofy has misplaced throughout his home. There are also certain objects that can come alive and "attack" Goofy such as a rumbling washing machine, a vacuum cleaner, and a lawn mower. Collecting corresponding items will unlock paintings in Goofy's rec room, which can be used to access several mini-games inspired by classic Goofy cartoons. Completing each mini-game will unlock the cartoon upon which it was based, which can be played on Goofy's film projector. The game is considered "completed" when the player completes all of the mini-games, finds all of the cartoon-specific items, and collects all 60 film canisters, unlocking the final cartoon.

The unlockable cartoons include The Art of Skiing (1941), The Art of Self Defense (1941), How to Fish (1942), How to Play Golf (1944), The Big Wash (1948), and Man's Best Friend (1952).

== Development and release ==
The game was announced by NewKidCo in April 2001 for a release in May. The game would release at the end of June, and was sold as a $19.99 budget title in North America.
