= Max Goof =

Animated cartoon character

- Goofy and Mickey Mouse & Friends character
- Max Goof in An Extremely Goofy Movie
- First appearance: Fathers Are People (1951) (as Goofy Junior); Goof Troop (1992) (as Max Goof)
- Created by: Michael Peraza Jr. Robert Taylor
- Designed by: Michael Peraza Jr.
- Voiced by: Goofy Junior: Bobby Driscoll (1951–1952); June Foray (1953); Kevin Corcoran (1961); Max Goof: Dana Hill (1992–1996; Goof Troop); Jason Marsden (1995–present); Aaron Lohr (A Goofy Movie; singing voice); Jeannie Elias (The Spirit of Mickey); Shaun Fleming (Mickey's Once Upon a Christmas)
- Full name: Maximilian Goof
- Aliases: Maxie, Mad Max, Max-O, Max-A-Mundo, Maxola, Maximum, Maxman, Goofy Junior, Junior
- Species: Anthropomorphic dog
- Occupation: Middle school student (Goof Troop); High school student (A Goofy Movie); College student (An Extremely Goofy Movie); Parking valet (House of Mouse)
- Family: Goofy (father)
- Significant others: Roxanne (A Goofy Movie/House of Mouse); Mona (Mickey's Twice Upon a Christmas)
- Relatives: Amos Goofy (grandfather); Gilbert Goof (cousin); Debbie (cousin); Aunt Goophelia (great-aunt); Pattonleather Goof (great-great-uncle); Wernher von Goof (father's cousin); M. Angelo Goof (great-uncle); Gooferamus T. Goofy (ancestor); Caveman Goof (ancestor); Dr. Frankengoof (ancestor); Mopalong Goof (ancestor); Sir Goofy of Knock-Knees (ancestor)

Maximilian "Max" Goof is a cartoon character who is the son of the Disney character Goofy. He first appeared in the 1951 short Fathers Are People as a kid under the name of Goofy Junior, continuing under that identity in later 1950s short films, and later appeared in the 1992 television series Goof Troop as Max Goof, as a preteen, being his official name ever since. He then later appeared as a teenager in the spin-off film A Goofy Movie (1995), and as a young adult in its direct-to-video sequel An Extremely Goofy Movie (2000), and in the 2001 television series House of Mouse. He appeared as a child in the direct-to-video film Mickey's Once Upon a Christmas (1999) and as a young adult in its sequel Mickey's Twice Upon a Christmas (2004).

Max has also appeared as a playable character in video games such as Goof Troop (1993) for the Super NES, Disney Golf (2002) for the PlayStation 2, and Disney's Extremely Goofy Skateboarding (2001) for PC CD.

== Origins ==
The first appearance of Goofy's son was in the 1951 theatrical short Fathers Are People. He is referred to as Goofy Junior or simply Junior. He later appeared in a few other shorts such as Father's Lion (1952), Father's Day Off (in which Goofy refers to his son as "George" at one point), Father's Week-end (1953), and Aquamania (1961). In these earlier films, Goofy was also portrayed with a wife, though nameless and with her face always hidden from view. When Goof Troop was created, Goofy Junior evolved into Max, and Goofy's wife was no longer on the scene. Disney Guest Services FAQ later stated there is no definitive answer regarding details of his mother, as one has not been revealed "on the screen".

== Overview ==
Max as he appears in the Disney Parks

Max is one of the few Disney characters, aside from his best friend PJ and Huey, Dewey, and Louie, child or otherwise, who has actually aged in subsequent appearances. He is depicted as an 11 1/2-year-old in Goof Troop, then a teenager in high school in A Goofy Movie, and then in An Extremely Goofy Movie he is a high school graduate starting college. In House of Mouse, he is still a teenager but one who is old enough to be employed as a parking valet. In Mickey's Once Upon a Christmas, he is a child who looks and sounds younger than he does in Goof Troop. In Mickey's Twice Upon a Christmas, he is a young adult who is returning home for the holidays.

Max, much to his own dismay, takes after his father at times, whether it be mannerisms (including Goofy's trademark laugh) or occasionally being clumsy (although that is a trait he does not display obviously in An Extremely Goofy Movie during the College X-Games competition). Max is originally shown to be embarrassed by his laugh, however towards the end of A Goofy Movie and his subsequent appearances, he is shown to embrace it. Max is shown to have a scream similar to Goofy's in the video game Disney Sports Skateboarding.

While Goofy is still clumsy, he works hard to be a good father towards Max, at one time reprimanding him to take personal responsibility by telling him about his (Max's) great-uncle, Eliot Goof, an FBI agent with a never-give-up attitude (and a parody of Eliot Ness).

Max's personality has evolved as the character has aged. As a child, he is shown to be very close to his father. He spent most of his time tagging along with Goofy during his father's shenanigans; however, as he grows, their relationship becomes strained. In Goof Troop, there are times he would get suckered in by Pete and his get-rich-quick schemes, only to come around towards the end. Despite everything, Max loves his father, even if he does wish that Goofy would be a little more normal.

As a teenager and young adult, Max is portrayed as an emotional, passionate and ambitious albeit self-conscious and rebellious character. He grows while striving for independence, navigating the conflicts that arise from his father's goofy nature. Max is prone to feeling humiliated and overwhelmed by Goofy's behaviour which is further hindered by Goofy not always understanding the wishes and needs of his son.

In the Goof Troop television series, Max is voiced by Dana Hill, while Shaun Fleming voices the younger Max in Mickey's Once Upon a Christmas. Jason Marsden voices an older Max in all other appearances starting with A Goofy Movie. The Goof Troop series shows some of his relatives – an older cousin named Debbie was featured in the episode "Leader of the Pack". In the Halloween episode "Hallow-Weenies", his father's "great-great-granddaddy" was Gooferamus T. Goofy, while a "Gooferamus G. Goof" is instead referred in "Calling All Goofs" as Max's "great-great-great-grandpappy"; at a family reunion in "Calling All Goofs" his relatives are Goofy's Aunt Goophelia, Pattonleather Goof (Goofy's great-uncle and a parody of George S. Patton), Wernher von Goof (Goofy's scientist cousin and a parody of Wernher von Braun), and M. Angelo Goof (Goofy's artist uncle and a parody of Michelangelo). In "the Old Country" his father's "great-grand uncle" was the late mad scientist Dr. Frankengoof. Other relatives include Sir Goofy of Knock-Knees A.K.A. "Goofin' Hood" (Max's great-great-great-great-great-great-great-great-great-great-grandfather and a parody of Robin Hood), Sherlock Goof (Max's great-great-great uncle and a parody of Sherlock Holmes), Mopalong Goofy (Max's great-great-great-grandpa and a parody of Hopalong Cassidy), and Caveman Goof (Max's and Goofy's prehistoric ancestor). In one episode of Goof Troop, Goofy says that Max was scared of the witch in Snow White and the Seven Dwarfs when he was younger.

Over the course of his life, Max's has been romantically involved with at least two young ladies. In A Goofy Movie, Max tries to impress a popular girl at his school named Roxanne, and ends up with her by the film's end, but by the second movie, Max is apparently single again as he flirts with a number of other girls at the college. However, in an episode of House of Mouse, he and Roxanne are a couple once more, on a date at the titular House of Mouse. Later, in Mickey's Twice Upon a Christmas, Max is seen with yet another a girl named Mona, whom he brings home for Christmas to meet his father and attempts to impress her while trying not to be embarrassed by his father's goofiness. Both Roxanne and Mona are voiced by Kellie Martin, except in the House of Mouse episode in which Roxanne is instead voiced by Grey DeLisle.

Max has a love for skateboarding, as shown in the Goof Troop episodes "Leader of the Pack" and "Meanwhile, Back at the Ramp" and the films A Goofy Movie and An Extremely Goofy Movie.

In the series Goof Troop, Max is playful, brave, loyal, and quirky; despite the changes he undergoes in the two movies, the person truly responsible for ruining the boy's life was always Pete who is ultimately punished for his actions—whereas Max is frequently forgiven and accepted by everyone, who treat him with greater friendliness and respect.

== Appearances ==
=== Goof Troop ===
In the series Goof Troop, Max is the 11-and-a-half years old son of Goofy. At the same age, Max moved to his father's hometown of Spoonerville with him and has lived there ever since. He is active, nice, observant, friendly, and best friends with P.J., Pete's son. He and P.J. are in the same grade at junior high school. Max, like in all of his appearances, loves his father but wishes he would be a bit more normal, and dislikes the idea of sharing similarities with him.

=== A Goofy Movie ===
A Goofy Movie in 1995 features Max as a 14-year-old high school student, finishing the freshman school year before going on summer vacation. Max has grown to find his father's goofy antics embarrassing, and is likewise viewed by his peers as a geek and a goof himself; a view he seeks to change at the school assembly when he dresses up like the musician rock star Powerline and interrupts the principal's speech to dance and perform to Powerline's hit song "Stand Out" before the entire student body. Additionally, Max seeks to gain the attention of his crush, a girl named Roxanne, whom Max is convinced only ever looks right through him and believes the laugh he inherited from his father ("a-hyuck") is to her disliking. Though Max ends up in detention for hijacking the assembly, he succeeds in not only impressing the other students but also winning the affections of Roxanne, who shyly yet delightedly agrees to go with him to a party that is to be held the next Saturday.

However, the principal informs Max's father, Goofy, about Max's bad behavior. Fearful that his son is becoming a delinquent, Goofy decides to take Max on a cross-country fishing trip for some 'father-son bonding', much to Max's chagrin. Before Goofy and Max hit the road, Max pays a quick visit to Roxanne's house to explain to her why he can no longer go with her to the party but ends up lying to her that it is because he is instead going to see Powerline live in concert in Los Angeles and that he and his father will join Powerline on stage for the last song since, as Max claims, Goofy and Powerline are an old acquaintance. The guilt from this lie eats at Max throughout the film, while Goofy tries to bond with his son in ways that end up pushing Max away even further. When Goofy appoints Max the official navigator of their road trip, things go much more smoothly for the two as Max gets to pick all the stops along the way.

But, unbeknownst to Goofy, Max had secretly changed the driving route on the map to lead them to Los Angeles, and when Goofy finds out, he and Max come to a head as the two finally let out all their held-back emotions at each other before they finally reach an understanding in which Max confesses to his dad how he has felt about Roxanne and the lie he told her before while Goofy explains that he just wants to be a part of Max's life and that even though he's all grown up, he is still Goofy's son. By this point, Max and Goofy admit that they are stuck together and would not want to be with anyone else in this situation. The two actually make it to the Powerline concert, even appearing (accidentally) onstage. By the end of the film, when the two arrive back home, Max reveals to Roxanne that he lied, admitting that he just wanted her to like him. Roxanne in turn confesses that she already did like Max, revealing that the goofy laugh Max had been so embarrassed by was the very thing that led to her liking him. After Goofy's car suddenly explodes due to the damage after it had fallen down the waterfall, he is sent crashing through the roof of Roxanne's porch, at which point Max introduces Roxanne to his dad.

=== An Extremely Goofy Movie ===
In the direct-to-video sequel to A Goofy Movie, An Extremely Goofy Movie (2000), Max is a high school graduate and leaves for college with his best friends P.J. and Bobby Zimuruski. He hopes to start a new life for himself and partake in the College X-Games competition. Upon his arrival to the campus, he and his friends are met by the five-time X-Games champions, the Gamma Mu Mu fraternity. However, because the Gammas invited only Max and not P.J. and Bobby to join them, Max makes a bet against the Gammas' leader, Bradley Uppercrust, to see who will be towel boy to the other should either win the X-Games.

Meanwhile, Goofy gets fired from his job (for an accident caused by his empty nest syndrome) and must go back to college to get a degree, as it is the only way for him to get a new job. He attends the same college as his son, much to Max's dismay as he had hoped to finally get away from his father's overbearing doting. Max initially comforts Goofy due to his job loss then establishes firm ground rules including to not interfere with the X-games practice. Goofy ignores Max's boundaries, causing Max increasing frustration. Eventually, Max manages to distract his father by introducing him to Ms. Sylvia Marpole, the college's librarian, who takes a romantic interest in Goofy and vice versa leaving Max the opportunity to focus on his skateboarding. When Goofy gets a date with Sylvia, he rushes off to tell Max only to interfere with Max's practice, resulting in the onlooking Bradley to misinterpret Goofy's clumsy antics on Max's skateboard for skill and offers Goofy membership to the Gammas. Max encourages his father to join, viewing it as another distraction to keep Goofy further away from his X-Games practices.

When Goofy inadvertently beats Max at the qualifying rounds for the College X-Games (thanks in part to some sneaky cheating by Bradley), Max ends up yelling at his father, telling him to "leave me alone and get your own life." Goofy is deeply hurt by this and withdraws from Max, Sylvia and college as a result. Max is disconcerted due from losing at his best event and being beaten by Goofy in the qualifiers. He considers transferring himself to another campus, believing that the college is better off with his father instead of him. But P.J., Bobby, and Beret Girl convince him to stay and continue to compete in the X-Games.

When Goofy later overhears the Gammas' plan to cheat in the games, he tries to warn his son, who does not believe him, due to their strained relationship. But once it becomes clear to Max (during the X-Games' final round) that the Gammas really have been cheating all along, Max realizes that Goofy was telling the truth and, feeling regret for not listening to his warnings, he asks his dad to fill in for the incapacitated P.J., which Goofy quickly accepts. During the final stretch of the triathlon, Bradley activates a rocket hidden in Max's skateboard, causing an explosion that ends up trapping fellow Gamma member Tank underneath some fallen fiery debris. Max forgoes heading straight to the finish line to first rescue Tank (with help from Goofy) and manages to barely beat Bradley to the finish line.

Goofy later graduates from college. Both father and son make amends at Goofy's graduation, and Max gives his father the X-Games championship trophy as a gesture of goodwill. With their relationship restored, the two part ways amicably, with Goofy - now cured of his empty nest syndrome - leaves Max to live his own life at college and heads on another date with Sylvia.

=== House of Mouse ===
In the television series House of Mouse, Max is still a teenager (although considerably older than in A Goofy Movie) and works as the parking valet for the club, and appears to be most level-headed and calm of all the club's employees. However, this may be because his duties are not nearly as important as some of the others, and his inclusions are just to help out the rest of the cast. Yet, in episodes that revolve around him or Goofy, his insecurities and personal flaws are much more noticeable and intentional.

In the episode "Goofy for a Day", after Max says that he thinks that Goofy's waiter job is not as important as Mickey and Donald's, Goofy challenges Max to be a waiter for a day. After seeing how hard it is to wait on tables and keep customers happy, Max finally sees the value of his father's work.

In "Max's New Car", he wants to get a car, but his father feels that he is not ready for one yet because driving is a big responsibility.

In "Max's Embarrassing Date", Max is off work and on a date with Roxanne at the House of Mouse. While all the main Disney cast (Mickey, Minnie, Donald and Daisy) attempted to keep Goofy away from the two so as to not embarrass Max in front of Roxanne, they ended up embarrassing him themselves, albeit even worse than Goofy would have, until Max speaks up to them and Goofy finally cuts in to stop the embarrassment from going any further and give Max and Roxanne some privacy for the night.

Max makes a cameo appearance in the direct-to-video film Mickey's House of Villains when the villains are entering the House of Mouse.

=== Mickey's Once Upon a Christmas ===
In the Mickey's Once Upon a Christmas segment "A Very Goofy Christmas", Max goes bicycling into the mall with Goofy to mail his letter to Santa Claus. When Pete tells Max that Santa does not exist, Goofy goes out of his way to try and prove him wrong. This causes a rift between Goofy and Max, especially after the former impersonated Santa during a Christmas party. After Goofy's attempts to prove Santa's existence fail, he becomes deeply disillusioned. To cheer his heartbroken father up, Max decides to impersonate Santa himself. In the end, the real Santa finally arrives, to the joyful awe and wonderment of Goofy and Max, which in turn proves Pete wrong all along.

=== Mickey's Twice Upon a Christmas ===
The direct-to-video animated film Mickey's Twice Upon a Christmas (a sequel to Mickey's Once Upon a Christmas) is currently Max's latest appearance in any Disney media produced. In the segment titled "Christmas Maximus", Max has grown up into a young adult. He brings his friend Mona (whom Max hopes to make his girlfriend) home for Christmas to meet his father. Goofy picks them up at the train station and brings them back to the house, where Goofy shows Mona Max's baby pictures and unwittingly embarrasses Max with all his fatherly love. In the end, as Mona finds Goofy's quirks to be endearing, Max decides to forget his embarrassment and join in the fun.

Max later appears (in a non-speaking role) with his father and the other characters in the last segment of the film, "Mickey's Dog-Gone Christmas", in which they drive around the city in a snowplow to look for Pluto, who had previously run away after having angered Mickey. After Pluto returns, everyone pulls up to Mickey's house in the snowplow, exits the snowplow, and goes inside the house to celebrate Christmas. Max and everyone applaud Mickey and Pluto topping the Christmas tree with the star decoration, and then they all join in singing a short medley of "We Wish You a Merry Christmas" and "Deck the Halls".

During the end credits sequence, a pop-up book version of Max and Mona are seen sliding close to each other (presumably to share a kiss) before a pop-up version of Goofy covers them both from view with a picture frame containing credits specific to the "Christmas Maximus" segment. Later, the closing image of Goofy and Max holding a Christmas caroling book together from the end of "Mickey's Dog-Gone Christmas" is shown again towards the end of the credits.

=== Other appearances ===
- Max Goof makes a cameo appearance in some photos in the DuckTales episode "Quack Pack!".
- Max Goof makes a cameo appearance in the film Chip 'n Dale: Rescue Rangers during the end credits.
- Max Goof appears in a promotional video produced for Disney Channel's fortieth anniversary.
- Max Goof appears as a playable character in the mobile game Disney Heroes: Battle Mode. He has friendship campaigns with Luz Noceda and Dr. Doofenshmirtz in the game.

== Disney Parks ==
At the Walt Disney World, Max is a meetable character, and is featured during the "Move It! Shake It! Mousekedance It!" parade. He and Goofy were also part of the "Mickey's Magical TV World" show in the Magic Kingdom.

At Tokyo Disneyland, Max occasionally appears with Goofy on floats in seasonal parades. He can also be found sometimes as a meetable character at the front of the park.

== Voice Actors ==
Bobby Driscoll voiced Goofy Junior from 1951-1952.

In 1992, when Goof Troop was created, Goofy Junior evolved into preteen Max Goof and was voiced by Dana Hill, who would voice Max for commercials, Disney Projects, Promos, Disney Parks, attractions, consumer products and other miscellaneous material (with the exception of A Goofy Movie) until her death in 1996.

In 1995, Max Goof became a teenager in A Goofy Movie in which was he voiced by a then 20-year-old Jason Marsden, who has continued to voice Max in An Extremely Goofy Movie (2000), House of Mouse (2001-2003), Mickey's Twice Upon a Christmas (2004), and other Disney projects.
