= Disney Sports Skateboarding =

2002 video game

- North American cover art for GameCube
- Developer: Konami Computer Entertainment Osaka
- Publisher: Konami
- Director: Tadahiro Kaneko
- Producer: Kouki Takahash
- Designers: Kazuko Otani; Takeshi Matsuda
- Programmers: Masayasu Tamaki; Takashi Yokota; Michitoshi Momose; Mitsuhiro Nishide; Daigo Nakamura; Hikaru Hada; Mitsuhisa Shibuya
- Composers: Kazuko Otani; Takeshi Matsuda
- Platforms: Game Boy Advance, GameCube
- Release: Game Boy Advance: JP: July 25, 2002; NA: November 12, 2002; UK: March 7, 2003; GameCube: JP: September 19, 2002; NA: November 12, 2002; UK: March 7, 2003; AU: March 21, 2003
- Genre: Sports
- Modes: Single-player, multiplayer

Disney Sports Skateboarding (Note: Japanese: ディズニースポーツ：スケートボーディング, Hepburn: Dizunī Supōtsu: Sukētobōdingu) is a 2002 skateboarding video game developed and published by Konami. It was released for the GameCube and Game Boy Advance. It received negative reviews.

== Gameplay ==
The game includes eight worlds with skating-objectives and collectibles, more than 40 tricks, and five game modes, including two-player simultaneous play. In each zone, the player's main objective is to find and retrieve various checkpoints within a time limit. Players can choose from a variety of Disney characters, including: Mickey Mouse, Minnie Mouse, Donald Duck, Goofy, Max Goof and Pete, and can customize their outfits and skateboards.

== Reception ==
Reception

Aggregate score
Aggregator	Score	
Aggregator	GBA	GameCube
Metacritic	42/100	36/100

Review scores
Publication	Score	
Publication	GBA	GameCube
Famitsu	22/40	29/40
GamesMaster	45%	N/A
GameSpot	3.2/10	2.2/10
IGN	3/10	3/10
Jeuxvideo.com	7/20	10/20
NGC Magazine	54%	64%
Nintendo Power	3.4/5	3/5

The game received "unfavorable" reviews on both platforms according to the review aggregation website Metacritic. In Japan, Famitsu gave it a score of 29 out of 40 for the GameCube version, and 22 out of 40 for the Game Boy Advance version.

When reviewing GameCube and Game Boy Advance versions, GameSpot was critical to the gameplay mechanics, and considered the game to be worse than Disney Sports Basketball.
