= How to Fish =

- Theatrical release poster
- Directed by: Jack Kinney
- Produced by: Walt Disney
- Starring: Pinto Colvig
- Color process: Technicolor
- Production company: Walt Disney Productions
- Distributed by: RKO Radio Pictures
- Release date: December 4, 1942
- Running time: 7 minutes (one reel)
- Country: United States
- Language: English

How to Fish is an animated short produced by Walt Disney Productions and first released on December 4, 1942. It stars Goofy and was directed by Jack Kinney.

== Plot ==
Like all "How To" Disney shorts, this one opens with a narrator explaining how to fish, with Goofy acting as the visual narrator. This short film does not have a plot; all the facts are jumbled together, with several humorous facts and clips.

== Voice cast ==
- Goofy: George Johnson
- Narrator: John McLeish

== Home media ==
The short was released in the 2001 PlayStation game, Goofy's Fun House, on December 2, 2002, on Walt Disney Treasures: The Complete Goofy, and on Walt Disney's Classic Cartoon Favorites Starring Goofy Volume 3.
