= Goofy Gymnastics =

- Directed by: Jack Kinney
- Story by: Dick Kinney
- Produced by: Walt Disney
- Starring: Pinto Colvig (uncredited); Billy Bletcher (uncredited)
- Narrated by: John McLeish (uncredited)
- Music by: Oliver Wallace
- Animation by: John Sibley; Wolfgang Reitherman; Ed Aardal; Dan MacManus
- Layouts by: Al Zinnen
- Backgrounds by: Merle Cox
- Color process: Technicolor
- Production company: Walt Disney Productions
- Distributed by: RKO Radio Pictures
- Release date: September 23, 1949 (U.S.)
- Running time: 6:30 (one reel)
- Language: English

Goofy Gymnastics is a Goofy cartoon produced by Walt Disney Productions and released by RKO Radio Pictures on September 23, 1949.

== Plot ==
Goofy enters home tired after a hard day at work. Exhausted, he suddenly notices an exercise advertisement in his newspaper. He orders gymnastics equipment and with the aid of an instruction record he tries out using the barbells, the chin-up bars and cable expanders, all of which meet with disastrous results. Goofy destroys the floors of his apartment in the process and flies out of the window before he is swung back against the muscular chart of his equipment. While he stands behind the cardboard muscular man he is glad that he finally resembles a muscular man.

== Legacy ==
Goofy Gymnastics is one of Goofy's most popular and famous cartoons. The cartoon is also shown in Who Framed Roger Rabbit (1988) during the scene where Roger and Eddie hide in a cinema. Roger Rabbit laughs out loud with the cartoon, praises Goofy's timing and finesse and claims he is a "genius". However, this is an anachronism, since Who Framed Roger Rabbit is set in 1947, while Goofy Gymnastics was released in 1949. This cartoon was also shown in September 2002 as part of the "Salute to Sports" episode of House of Mouse.

== Voice cast ==
- Goofy: Pinto Colvig
- Off-screen man: Billy Bletcher
- Narrator: John McLeish

== Home media ==
The short was released on December 2, 2002, on Walt Disney Treasures: The Complete Goofy and on the "Walt Disney's Classic Cartoon Favorites Extreme Sports Fun" Volume 5. It was released to Disney+ on July 7, 2023.
