= How to Play Golf =

1944 film by Jack Kinney

- Directed by: Jack Kinney
- Produced by: Walt Disney
- Starring: Pinto Colvig
- Color process: Technicolor
- Production company: Walt Disney Productions
- Distributed by: RKO
- Release date: 1944 (USA)
- Running time: 7 min (one reel)
- Language: English

How to Play Golf is a 1944 short animated Walt Disney Productions film directed by Jack Kinney. Eight minutes long, it was distributed by RKO, and was a part of a series where Goofy learned to play various sports.

== Reception ==
Upon release, The Film Daily called it "highly hilarious", and gave the following review:

"This, another of Walt Disney's Technicolor cartoons featuring the Goof, is a howl. While the narrator explains how properly to play golf, the Goof attempts to demonstrate. Naturally he does everything wrong, with superb results from a comedy point of view. The technique and animation are noteworthy indeed. Mark this down as a topflight booking of its kind."

== Voice cast ==
- Goofy: Pinto Colvig
- Narrator: Fred Shields

== Home media ==
The short was rereleased on the 2001 PlayStation game Goofy's Fun House, and on December 2, 2002, on Walt Disney Treasures: The Complete Goofy.

== See also ==
- List of American films of 1944
