= Mickey's Once Upon a Christmas =

1999 American animated film

- Film poster
- Directed by: Alex Mann; Bradley Raymond; Jun Falkenstein; Bill Speers; Toby Shelton
- Screenplay by: Charlie Cohen; Thomas Hart; Scott Gorden; Tom Nance; Carter Crocker; Richard Cray; Temple Mathews; Eddie Guzelian
- Based on: Mickey Mouse by; Walt Disney; Ub Iwerks; Donald Duck by; Walt Disney; Dick Lundy; Goofy by; Art Babbitt; Frank Webb
- Produced by: Jim Ballantine
- Starring: Wayne Allwine; Russi Taylor; Tony Anselmo; Diane Michelle; Tress MacNeille; Alan Young; Bill Farmer; Corey Burton; Shaun Fleming; Jim Cummings; Jeff Bennett; Gregg Berger; Kylie Dempsey; Taylor Dempsey; Andrew McDonaugh; Pat Musick; Frank Welker; Mae Whitman; April Winchell
- Edited by: Elen Orson
- Music by: J. Eric Schmidt
- Production companies: Walt Disney Television Animation; Walt Disney Video Premiere
- Distributed by: Walt Disney Home Video
- Release date: November 9, 1999
- Running time: 65 minutes
- Country: United States
- Language: English

Mickey's Once Upon a Christmas is a 1999 American direct-to-video animated Christmas anthology comedy fantasy film produced by Walt Disney Television Animation and Walt Disney Video Premiere and released by Walt Disney Home Video on November 9, 1999. The film includes three features: Stuck on Christmas (featuring Donald Duck, Huey, Dewey, and Louie, Daisy Duck, and Scrooge McDuck), A Very Goofy Christmas (featuring Goofy, Max, and Pete) and Mickey and Minnie's Gift of the Magi (featuring Mickey Mouse, Minnie Mouse, Pluto, Pete, Daisy Duck, and Mortimer Mouse). Other Disney characters also make cameos in the film. Stuck on Christmas is inspired by the 1892 short story "Christmas Every Day" by William Dean Howells and Mickey and Minnie's Gift of the Magi is based on the 1905 short story "The Gift of the Magi" by O. Henry.

Upon the release of Mickey's Once Upon a Christmas, the film received mixed reviews from critics. However, it was better-received by audiences, and the annual celebration of Christmas has helped make the film a holiday cult classic.

A sequel, titled Mickey's Twice Upon a Christmas, was released on November 9, 2004. Unlike its predecessor, the sequel is produced in CGI rather than traditional animation and is composed of five segments.

== Plot ==
=== Stuck on Christmas ===
Huey, Dewey, and Louie wake up one Christmas morning and run downstairs, excited to open their presents before Daisy, Scrooge, and Gertie arrive. The boys then take their new sleds from Donald without reading the attached card and go sledding. After dinner, as Donald, Daisy, Scrooge, and Gertie sing carols, the boys play with their new toys. Having enjoyed the day immensely, the trio doesn't want it to end, so they wish upon a star to have Christmas every day.

They find the next morning that their wish has been granted, and at first, they are joyful. After a few days, however, they realize that every Christmas will be exactly the same, tiring them out greatly. The following day, the trio decides to "liven things up" with a series of tricks and pranks, including swapping the cooked turkey with a live one at dinner. The turkey runs amok through the house, and chaos ensues as Donald gives chase. The boys, distraught at what they have done, read Donald and Daisy's card that came with the sleds and realize Christmas isn't about presents or decorations; it is about love, caring, and being with family. The boys vow to make the next day the best Christmas possible to make up for their actions.

As the boys spread love and cheer by making breakfast for Donald, kissing Gertie, and helping Daisy with dinner, Donald eventually becomes suspicious as to why the boys are acting so nice. That evening, after Donald interferes with his family's carol-singing, Huey realizes Donald's suspicions, and he, Dewey, and Louie give their uncle a sailboat made out of their sleds as a gift. Genuinely touched by this gift, Donald hugs his nephews. With the boys having finally realized the true meaning of Christmas, the time loop ends, leading to the day after Christmas.

=== A Very Goofy Christmas ===
Goofy and his son Max prepare to mail a letter to Santa Claus. After a series of shenanigans involving them attempting to catch up with a mail truck that has driven off, their neighbour Pete tells Max that Santa does not exist, saying that he can't fly around the world in one night. Things begin to get worse when Goofy poses as Santa for some kids of a family in need, making Max believe that he tricked him upon discovering that this "Santa" is actually just his father. Goofy is determined to prove to Max that Santa does exist, and stays up on the house's roof all night on Christmas Eve to keep an eye out for him and photograph him, while a distraught Max just wants to move on and wishes for Goofy to do the same.

After mistaking a robber (who was robbing Pete's house) for Santa, Goofy eventually gives up hope of Santa coming. Max then does everything that Goofy did to try and cheer him up, including posing as a Santa himself, although Goofy soon finds out. The real Santa actually comes and gives Max the snowboard he had asked for earlier (as well as burying Pete in snow as punishment, rather than giving him any presents, for his disbelief and cruelly messing with Max's beliefs). When Max asks Goofy if Santa forgot his present, Goofy answers that every year he always asks for and receives the same gift: Max's happiness.

=== Mickey and Minnie's Gift of the Magi ===
Mickey wants to get Minnie a gold chain for her one heirloom, her watch, so he works at Crazy Pete's Tree Lot. Minnie wants to give Mickey a Christmas present as well, so she works to get a bonus at a department store. When Mickey offers a small tree to a poor family unable to buy a ten-footer tree, his greedy supervisor, Pete, steals Mickey's money and dismisses him. Pete inadvertently puts his lit cigar into his pocket with Mickey's money without noticing, which triggers a sequence that ends up setting himself, the money, including the 10-footers on fire.

Meanwhile, Minnie is called into her supervisor Mortimer Mouse's office to receive her bonus for her hard work – only for her to realize it's actually a fruitcake. After playing music for a local toy drive with the Firehouse Five, Mickey realizes he can trade his harmonica for the gold chain. The shop closes just when he gets there, and the owner is uninterested in the harmonica, but reconsiders after hearing Mickey play it. Back at Minnie's house, Mickey gives her the chain for her watch, which she reveals she sold to buy Mickey a case for his harmonica, which he also no longer has. Fortunately, Mickey and Minnie see how far they went to profess their love and are content with the fact that they will still be able to celebrate a happy Christmas with each other.

The main film ends with the main characters from all three segments gathering together to sing "Jingle Bells", "Deck the Halls", and "We Wish You a Merry Christmas".

== Voice cast ==
- Wayne Allwine as Mickey Mouse
- Russi Taylor as Minnie Mouse, Huey, Dewey, and Louie
- Tony Anselmo as Donald Duck
- Diane Michelle as Daisy Duck(Stuck on Christmas)
- Tress MacNeille as Daisy Duck (Gift of the Magi), Chip, and Aunt Gertie
- Alan Young as Scrooge McDuck
- Bill Farmer as Goofy, and Pluto
- Corey Burton as Dale
- Shaun Fleming as Max Goof
- Jim Cummings as Peg-Leg Pete, Policeman, Mailman, Fire Chief, Dad #1, The Onlooker, Shop Owner, and Santa Claus
- Jeff Bennett as Dad #2, Firefighter #2, Mortimer Mouse, Store Announcer, Man, and The Customer
- Gregg Berger as Mr Anderson, and Shopper #1
- Kylie Dempsey as Kid #2, and The Little Girl
- Taylor Dempsey as Little Jimmy, and Kid #1
- Andrew McDonaugh as The Poor Boy
- Pat Musick as The Distressed Woman, The Angry Woman, The Eccentric Lady, Shopper #2, and Mrs Anderson
- Frank Welker as Turkey, and Figaro
- Kelsey Grammer as Narrator
- Tommy Morgan as Mickey's Harmonica Soloist
- April Winchell as Firefighter #1, Mother, Old Woman, and The Firewoman

== Release ==
=== Home media ===
Mickey's Once Upon a Christmas was originally released on VHS and DVD on November 9, 1999. It was later re-released on VHS and on DVD (as part of the Walt Disney Gold Classic Collection) on November 7, 2000. Coinciding with its 15th anniversary, the film was released in a 2-Movie Collection Blu-ray and DVD with Mickey's Twice Upon a Christmas on November 4, 2014.

In 2000, the film was part of McDonald's Happy Meals toys as one six titles highlighted as the Disney Video Showcase Collection. Each toy came as one of three interlocking characters from the film (Mickey, Minnie, and Pluto) packaged in a simulated video case.

The film was made available to stream on Netflix. It was subsequently released on Disney+.

=== Broadcast ===
Mickey's Once Upon a Christmas aired in the United States on ABC Family in December 2013, and in December 2015. It aired on Freeform in December 2022.

== Reception and legacy ==
=== Critical response ===
The review aggregator website Rotten Tomatoes reported an approval rating of 50% based on 6 reviews with an average rating of 5.60/10.

Allison McClain Merrill of Screen Rant called the three stories of Mickey's Once Upon a Christmas "memorable", while Zach Grass wrote, "This movie is like a cup of hot chocolate with all the marshmallows and toppings you could possibly ask for. The plots aren't exactly deep, but they're touching, funny, and oh-so festive that you just can't help but catch the feels from these wholesome holiday stories. They'll definitely make your binging session merry and bright." Caitlin Gallagher of PopSugar described Mickey's Once Upon a Christmas as one of the "perfect holiday underdogs" and as a "heartwarming movie", while Sabienna Bowman said, "Each one of the segments is terrific, but Mickey and Minnie's version of "The Gift of the Magi" is a standout for being a total tearjerker." Andrea Beach of Common Sense Media gave Mickey's Once Upon a Christmas a grade of three out of five stars, and praised the depiction of positive messages and role models, citing love, caring, and the spirit of giving.

Megan McCluskey of Time included Mickey's Once Upon a Christmas in their "10 Best Christmas Movies for Kids on Netflix" list, stating, "Disney's most beloved characters get into some holiday hijinks in one of the best Christmas kid movies on Netflix. With two Disney-themed retellings of classic Christmas tales, "Stuck on Christmas" and "Mickey and Minnie's Gift of the Magi", as well as the original short "A Very Goofy Christmas", this animated anthology is a nice solo-watch for kids." Bryce Olin of FanSided included Mickey's Once Upon A Christmas in their "Best Christmas Movies on Netflix 2016" list. Michael Thomas of Collider included Mickey's Once Upon a Christmas in their "Best Holiday Movies and Shows on Disney+ Right Now" list, stating, "Once Upon a Christmas is Disney at its finest. It's a wholesome watch with beautiful animation, and all three stories fit well within the relatively short runtime. We're reminded why Mickey and the gang have endured for so long," while Ashley Amber ranked the film ninth in their "10 Best Animated Christmas Classics" list and described it as a "memorable watch for gen Z-ers and millennials alike."

Ashley Jones of Romper ranked Mickey's Once Upon a Christmas fifth in their "20 of the Best Christmas Movies for Kids" list, saying, "Though it's not so much a movie as it is a film-length collection of animated shorts, Mickey's Once Upon a Christmas earns a spot on this list thanks to its charming holiday appeal. Kids who love Mickey, Minnie, Donald, Goofy, and the whole crew won't be able to resist these heartwarming stories." Rachel Johnson of MovieWeb ranked Mickey's Once Upon a Christmas eighth in their "Best Christmas Movies of the 1990s" list and called it a "holiday gem". TV Insider ranked Mickey's Once Upon a Christmas thirty-eight in their "50 Best Holiday Specials and Movies of All Time" list, asserting, "There is lots of fun, songs and laughter and you'll find yourself being thawed out of any "humbug" state and embracing the Christmas spirit."

=== Accolades ===
Mickey's Once Upon a Christmas won the Award for Best Animated Feature Film at the 5th Kecskemét Animation Film Festival in 1999. It was nominated for Outstanding Achievement in an Animated Home Video Production at the 2000 Annie Awards.

== See also ==
- List of Christmas films
- List of films featuring time loops
