= Goofy =

Disney cartoon character

- Mickey Mouse & Friends / Goofy character
- First appearance: Mickey's Revue (1932) (as Dippy Dawg); Orphan's Benefit (1934) (as Goofy)
- Created by: Walt Disney; Art Babbitt; Frank Webb; Pinto Colvig
- Designed by: Tom Palmer; Art Babbitt
- Voiced by: Pinto Colvig (1932–1967); Jack Bailey (1939); Danny Webb (1940–1942, 1945); Hal Smith (1967–1983); Tony Pope (1979–1988); Will Ryan (1986–1988); Bill Farmer (1987–present); Other voices

In-universe information
- Full name: G.G. "Goofy" Goof
- Aliases: Dippy Dawg; George G. Geef; Goofus D. Dawg; Goofy G. Goof; Super Goof
- Species: Anthropomorphic dog
- Gender: Male
- Family: Goof family
- Spouse: Mrs. Geef / Mrs. Goof (1950s)
- Significant others: Clarabelle Cow (occasionally); Glory-Bee (1960s and 1970s newspaper strips); Zenobia (occasionally in Italian comics); Sylvia Marpole (An Extremely Goofy Movie)
- Children: Max Goof (son)
- Relatives: Pop Goofy (father); Mother Goofy (mother); Captain Goof-Beard (grandfather); Grandma Goofy (grandmother); Gilbert Goof (nephew); Arizona Goof (cousin); Goofilia (aunt); M. Angelo Goof (uncle); Pattonleather Goof (grand-uncle); Werner Von Goof (cousin)
- Nationality: American

Goofy is a cartoon character created by the Walt Disney Company. He is a tall, anthropomorphic dog who typically wears a turtle neck and vest, with pants, shoes, white gloves, and a tall hat originally designed as a rumpled fedora. Goofy is a close friend of Mickey Mouse and Donald Duck, and is Max Goof's father. He is normally characterized as hopelessly clumsy and dim-witted, yet this interpretation is not always definitive; occasionally, Goofy is shown as intuitive and clever, albeit in his own unique, eccentric way.

Goofy debuted in animated cartoons, starting in 1932 with Mickey's Revue as Dippy Dawg, who is older than Goofy would come to be. Later the same year, he was re-imagined as a younger character in the short The Whoopee Party. During the 1930s, he was used extensively as part of a comedy trio with Mickey and Donald. Starting in 1939, Goofy was given his own series of shorts that were popular in the 1940s and early 1950s. Two shorts starring Goofy were nominated for an Oscar: How to Play Football (1944) and Aquamania (1961). He also co-starred in a short series with Donald, including Polar Trappers (1938), where they first appeared without Mickey Mouse. Three more Goofy shorts were produced in the 1960s after which Goofy was only seen in television and Disney comics. He returned to theatrical animation in 1983 with Mickey's Christmas Carol. His most recent theatrical appearance was How to Hook Up Your Home Theater in 2007. Goofy has also been featured in television, most extensively in Goof Troop (1992), Mickey Mouse Works (1999–2000), House of Mouse (2001–2003), Mickey Mouse Clubhouse (2006–2016), Mickey Mouse (2013–2019), Mickey Mouse Mixed-Up Adventures (2017–2021), Mickey Mouse Funhouse (2021–2025) and Mickey Mouse Clubhouse+ (2025–present).

Originally known as Dippy Dawg, the character is more commonly known simply as "Goofy", a name used in his short film series. In his 1950s cartoons, he usually played a character called George G. Geef. Sources from the Goof Troop continuity give the character's full name as G. G. "Goofy" Goof, likely in reference to the 1950s name. In many other sources, both animated and comics, the surname Goof continues to be used. In other 2000s-era comics, the character's full name has occasionally been given as Goofus D. Dawg.

== Characteristics ==
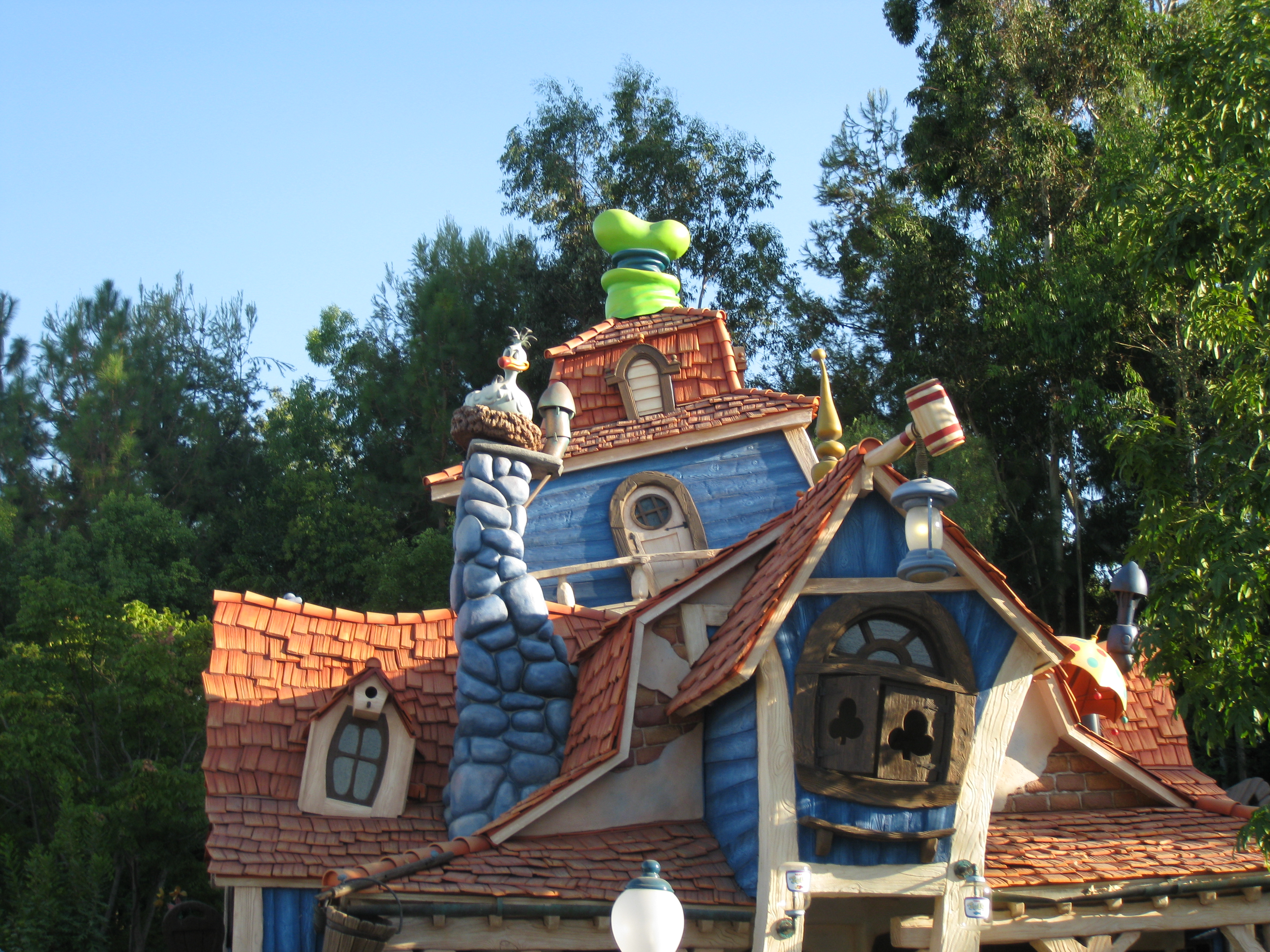
Goofy's house at Disneyland

In the comics and his pre-1992 animated appearances, Goofy was usually single and childless. Unlike Mickey and Donald, he did not have a steady girlfriend. The exception was the 1950s cartoons, in which Goofy played a character called George Geef who was married and at one point became the father of a kid named George Junior. In the Goof Troop series (1992–1993), however, Goofy was portrayed as a single father with a son named Max, and the character of Max made further animated appearances until 2004. This marked a division between animation and comics, as the latter kept showing Goofy as a single childless character, excluding comics taking place in the Goof Troop continuity. After 2004, Max disappeared from animation, thus removing the division between the two media. Goofy's wife was never shown, while George Geef's wife appeared—but always with her face unseen—in 1950s-produced cartoon shorts depicting the character as a "family man".

In the comics, Goofy usually appears as Mickey's sidekick, though he also is occasionally shown as a protagonist. Goofy lives in Mouseton in the comics and in Spoonerville in Goof Troop. In comics books and strips, Goofy's closest relatives are his smarter nephew Gilbert. and his grandmother, simply called Grandma Goofy. In Italian comics, he has been given several cousins, including adventurer Arizona Goof (original Italian name: Indiana Pipps), who is a spoof of the fictional archaeologist Indiana Jones.

Goofy's catchphrases are "gawrsh!" (which is his usual exclamation of surprise and his way of pronouncing "gosh"), along with "ah-hyuck!" (a distinctive chuckle) that is sometimes followed by a "hoo hoo hoo hoo!", and especially the Goofy holler (YAAA-HOO-HOO-HOO-HOOEEEEY!). In the classic shorts, he would sometimes say "Somethin' wrong here" (first heard in Lonesome Ghosts) whenever he suspected something was not right about the situation he was currently in, or sing a few bars of "The World Owes Me a Livin'" from the Silly Symphonies cartoon Grasshopper and the Ants (the first instance of Goofy singing this song is On Ice). In The Grasshopper and the Ants, the Grasshopper had an aloof character similar to Goofy and shared the same voice actor (Pinto Colvig) as him.

According to biographer Neal Gabler, Walt Disney disliked the Goofy cartoons, thinking they were merely "stupid cartoons with gags tied together" with no larger narrative or emotional engagement and a step backward to the early days of animation. As such, he threatened constantly to terminate the series, but only continued it to provide make-work for his animators. Animation historian Michael Barrier is skeptical of Gabler's claim, saying that his source did not correspond with what was written; according to Barrier, Disney did attempt, but relented, to terminate the series due to animated cartoons suffering from a decline in demand among cinemas.

== Film history ==
=== Origin and early years ===
Goofy, anonymous in his debut cartoon, Mickey's Revue (1932)

The character of Goofy originated with his voice actor, a former circus and vaudville actor, comedian, clown and chalk talk artist Pinto Colvig, who began working as a story man for Walt Disney Productions in 1930.

According to Colvig, one day in 1931, he was having a conversation with Walt Disney and director Wilfred Jackson, and began to reminisce about "…a grinny, half-baked village nitwit back in my hometown whose mannerisms I had copied and used for one of my former stage characters, The Oregon Appleknocker." Colvig later identified this "village nitwit" as a local flagman that worked at Jacksonville, Oregon's main railroad crossing, who he described as a "...slow-minded guy who is the happiest fellow in the world. Each small town has one, and he always seems to hang around the depot... As a youngster I used to watch every train come in, and I knew all the details and peculiarities of that flagman's life. I impersonated that man for Disney, not in jest, but because I admired him and his simplicity. I always laughed with him rather than at him."

Walt Disney was captivated by Colvig's impersonation and, eager to expand his cast of recognizable characters, decided to develop a new character around Colvig's former stage routine for Mickey's ever-growing roster of supporting players. The next day, Colvig went in front of a microphone and camera and started acting out the loose ungainly mannerisms of his Oregon Appleknocker persona, while animator Tom Palmer sketched out a character based on his performance. "Thus ‘Goofy, the Guy with a Silly Laugh’ was hatched", as Colvig would later declare with pride.

The character first appeared in Mickey's Revue, released on May 27, 1932. Directed by Jackson, the short features Mickey Mouse, Minnie Mouse, Horace Horsecollar and Clarabelle Cow performing a song and dance show: a typical Mickey cartoon of the time. What set this short apart was the appearance of a new character: a dog-like member of the audience who constantly irritates his fellow spectators by noisily crunching peanuts and laughing loudly (the laugh being provided by Colvig) until two of those fellow spectators knocked him out with their mallets, before revealing they have the same exact laugh.

This early version of Goofy was named Dippy Dawg by Disney artist Frank Webb and was depicted as an old man with a white beard, a puffy tail, and no trousers, shorts, or undergarments. A considerably younger and more refined version of the Dippy Dawg character next appeared in The Whoopee Party (released on September 17, 1932) this time as a party guest and a friend of Mickey and his gang.

Dippy Dawg made a total of six appearances between 1932 and 1933, but most of them were mere cameos. By his seventh appearance, in Orphan's Benefit (released on August 11, 1934), he gained the new name "Goofy", but was still considered a minor character.

=== Development under Art Babbitt ===
Inspired by popular comedy trio acts of the era – such as The Three Stooges and The Marx Brothers – Walt Disney and his storymen decided to team Mickey, Goofy and the newly popular character of Donald Duck together in a cartoon entitled Mickey's Service Station: directed by Ben Sharpsteen and eventually released on March 16, 1935.

In mid-1934, Walt held a story meeting for Mickey's Service Station where he and Sharpsteen began assigning animators to specific sequences. One of the animators assigned to the short, Art Babbitt, took a particular liking to a sequence with Goofy. "I had to fight for that..." Babbitt remembered years later:

"... in it [Mickey's Service Station] there's a small sequence of Goofy on this cylinder block of a car. And he reaches down in one of the holes of the cylinder block and his own hand comes up behind him. God, I wanted that... Walt was in this story meeting and I said, "Gee I want that." [Walt said] "Nah, I've got you scheduled to do Pete, Pegleg Pete". I said "I'll do Pegleg Pete, but give me Goofy, too." And so that was the final deal, I'd do Pegleg Pete and get Goofy for dessert. Goofy was originally a sort of stock character in mob scenes, so on, but nobody attempted to do anything with him, so I can't say that I created Goofy, but I was the first that made him into a character. I liked the character, there was all sorts of possibilities."

Babbitt's scene with Goofy was originally timed to be 7 feet of film (just over 4 seconds); however, Babbitt padded his scene adding additional bits of comic business, with the final scene being 57 feet (38 seconds) long. Sharpsteen was furious that Babbitt had gone over his allotted time without permission, but Walt was impressed by Babbitt's work and approved his scene.

Upon completing his sequence with Goofy in Mickey's Service Station, Babbitt (who had been studying Konstantin Stanislavski's theories of method acting) not only redesigned Goofy from his earlier ganglier appearance to a more ovular streamlined version, but also psychoanalyzed the character: something no other animator had done before. Babbitt wrote a two-and-a-half page character bible of Goofy, entitled Character Analysis of the Goof that circulated the studio in late 1934. Some of what Babbitt wrote included:

In my opinion the Goof, hitherto, has been a weak cartoon character because both his physical and mental make-up were indefinite and intangible. His figure was a distortion, not a caricature, and if he was supposed to have a mind or personality, he certainly was never given sufficient opportunity to display it... In the case of the Goof, the only characteristic which formerly identified itself with him was his voice. No effort was made to endow him with appropriate business to do, a set of mannerisms or a mental attitude...
... Think of the Goof as a composite of an everlasting optimist, a gullible Good Samaritan, a half-wit, a shiftless, good-natured colored boy and a hick... He can move fast if he has to, but would rather avoid any over-exertion, so he takes what seems the easiest way. He is a philosopher of the barber shop variety. No matter what happens, he accepts it finally as being for the best or at least amusing. He is willing to help anyone and offers his assistance even where he is not needed and just creates confusion. He very seldom, if ever, reaches his objective or completes what he has started. His brain being rather vapoury, it is difficult for him to concentrate on any one subject. Any little distraction can throw him off his train of thought and it is extremely difficult for the Goof to keep to his purpose. Yet the Goof is not the type of half-wit that is to be pitied. He doesn't dribble, drool or shriek. He is a good-natured, dumb bell who thinks he is pretty smart. He laughs at his own jokes because he can't understand any others. If he is a victim of a catastrophe, he makes the best of it immediately and his chagrin or anger melts very quickly into a broad grin. If he does something particularly stupid he is ready to laugh at himself after it all finally dawns on him. He is very courteous and apologetic and his faux pas embarrass him, but he tries to laugh off his errors. He has music in his heart even though it be the same tune forever, and I see him humming to himself while working or thinking. He talks to himself because it is easier for him to know what he is thinking if he hears it first.

Babbitt's Character Analysis was considered highly influential within the studio, and character bibles were quickly adopted for all Disney's major stars; including Mickey, Donald and Pluto.

Mickey's Service Station also set the template for a series of films where Mickey, Donald and Goofy attempted to perform a certain task, with each character being separated early on, and attempting to solve a problem in their own way and with their distinct style of comedy, before reuniting at the end – often resulting failure rather than success.

While other animators would also animate the character of Goofy in these "trio" shorts (such as in Mickey's Fire Brigade, released in August 1935, where an earlier Pre-Babbitt version of Goofy was animated by Wolfgang Reitherman), Art Babbitt became the Goofy specialist at the Disney studio and the authority on the character.

Babbitt continued to develop the character of Goofy when he next animated him in On Ice (released in September 1935). Here he developed a technique he called "breaking the joints" – where Goofy's arms, legs, feet and other appendages would bend the wrong way for a few frames before popping back into the correct position. This gave the character a lot more loose and unpredictable movements, emphasising his stupid personality.

Babbitt finally crystallized the character of Goofy with his third time animating the character in Moving Day (released in June 1936), where he was tasked to animate a scene of Goofy attempting to move a piano onto a truck. For this scene Babbitt created another first for animation: using his recently acquired 16mm camera, he filmed Pinto Colvig performing Goofy's movements in his Oregon Appleknocker persona, making Babbitt the first animator to use live-action reference.

As animation historian Michael Barrier wrote of this scene: "Babbitt's Moving Day animation was by far his most ambitious... Babbitt's Goofy was the first Disney character after [Norm] Ferguson's Pluto to have a visible inner life and Goofy, stupid though he was, was clearly more complex than Pluto. For the most part, Pluto simply reacted; Goofy schemed and planned, however dimly."

Ben Sharpsteen directed the majority of the Mickey, Donald and Goofy trio cartoons. Clock Cleaners and Lonesome Ghosts (released on both October 15 and December 24, 1937, respectively), are considered the highlights of this series, with the former being voted Number 27 in the book The 50 Greatest Cartoons.

Progressively during the series, Mickey's part diminished in favor of Donald, Goofy, and Pluto; Mickey, being the straight man of the trio, was rewritten to be a kinder and less rebellious character, in line with Disney's corporate image, but in the expense of his popularity. As Donald and Goofy's dynamic personalities made them substantially more versatile for writing gags, Mickey's role eventually diminished. Polar Trappers, released on June 17, 1938, was the first film to feature Goofy and Donald as a duo. Mickey would return in The Whalers, released on August 19, 1938, but this and Tugboat Mickey, released on April 26, 1940, would be the last two shorts to feature all three characters as a team.

=== Solo series ===
Goofy next starred at his first solo cartoon Goofy and Wilbur directed by Dick Huemer, first released on March 17, 1939. The short featured Goofy fishing with the help of Wilbur, his pet grasshopper. Jack Bailey provided Goofy's voice for the cartoon, as Pinto Colvig left Disney over a pay dispute in 1938. Goofy would sparingly be voiced or remain voiceless in cartoons until Colvig returned in 1944. During this period, Colvig voiced incidental characters for other studios' cartoons with Goofy's voice.

==== The How to... series ====
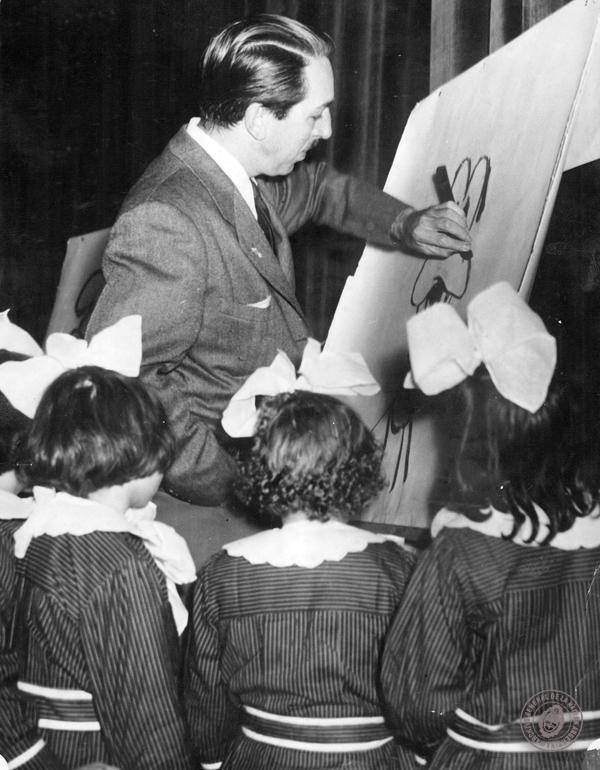
Disney drawing Goofy for a group of girls in Argentina, 1941

Jack Kinney would take over the Goofy cartoons with the second short Goofy's Glider (1940). Kinney's Goofy cartoons would feature zany, fast-paced action and gags similar to those being made at Warner Bros. and MGM, and possibly influenced by Tex Avery. Kinney found Goofy to be "a nice long, lean character that you could move; you could get poses out of him, crazy poses". A sports fan, he would place Goofy in How to... themed shorts in which Goofy would demonstrate, poorly, how to perform certain sports.

How to Ride a Horse, a segment in the 1941 film The Reluctant Dragon, would establish the tone and style of future shorts like The Art of Skiing (1941), How to Fish (1942), How to Swim (1942) and How to Play Golf (1944). Cartoon shorts like How to Play Baseball (1942), How to Play Football (1944) and Hockey Homicide (1945) would feature Goofy not as a single character but multiple characters playing the opposing teams. Animation historian Paul Wells considers Hockey Homicide to be the "peak" of the sports cartoons. Some of the later sports-theme cartoons, like Double Dribble (1946) and They're Off (1948) would be directed by Jack Hannah.

Pinto Colvig had a falling out with Disney in 1937 and left the studio, leaving Goofy without a voice. Kinney recalls "so we had to use whatever was in the library; you know, his laugh and all those things. But he did have a hell of a library, of different lines of dialogue". In addition, the studio had voice artist Danny Webb record new dialog. Kinney also paired Goofy with a narrator voiced by John McLeish: "He had this deep voice, just a great voice, and he loved to recite Shakespeare. So I suggested, my God, we'll get McLeish for a narrator, and don't tell him that he's not doing it straight. Just let him play it". Colvig returned to Disney in 1941 and resumed the voice until 1967.

==== The everyman years ====
Goofy in his "George Geef" persona in Cold War (1951)

Disney had started casting Goofy as a suburban everyman in the late 1940s. And with this role came changes in depiction. Goofy's facial stubble and his protruding teeth were removed to give him a more refined look. His clothing changed from a casual style to wearing business suits. He began to look more human and less dog-like, with his ears hidden in his hat. By 1951, Goofy was portrayed as being married and having a son of his own. Neither the wife nor the son was portrayed as dog-like. The wife's face was never seen, but her form was human. The son lacked Goofy's dog-like ears. One notable short made during this era is Motor Mania (1950). Kinney disliked making most of these later shorts, stating "...those pictures were disasters, because I didn't fight it hard enough". Goofy would also be given a formal name in these cartoons, George Geef.

Christopher P. Lehman connects this depiction of the character to Disney's use of humor and animal characters to reinforce social conformity. He cites as an example Aquamania (1961), where everyman Goofy drives to the lake for a boat ride. During a scene depicting a pile-up accident, every car involved has a boat hitched to its rear bumper. Goofy is portrayed as one of the numerous people who had the same idea about how to spend their day. Every contestant in the boat race also looks like Goofy. Lehman does not think that Disney used these aspects of the film to poke fun at conformity. Instead, the studio apparently accepted conformity as a fundamental aspect of the society of the United States. Aquamania was released in the 1960s, but largely maintained and prolonged the status quo of the 1950s. The decade had changed, but the Disney studio followed the same story formulas for theatrical animated shorts it had followed in the previous decade. And Lehman points that Disney received social approval for it. Aquamania itself received a nomination for the Academy Award for Best Animated Short Film.

=== Later appearances ===
After the 1965 educational film Goofy's Freeway Troubles, Goofy was mostly retired except for cameos because of the cartoons' fading popularity and the death of voice actor Pinto Colvig. Goofy had an act in the 1969 tour show Disney on Parade with costar Herbie the Love Bug. His profile began to rise again after his appearance in Mickey's Christmas Carol as the ghost of Jacob Marley. After that, he appeared in Sport Goofy in Soccermania, a 1987 television special. He made a brief appearance in Academy Award-winning film Who Framed Roger Rabbit, in which the titular character, Roger Rabbit, says of Goofy: "Nobody takes a wallop like Goofy! What timing! What finesse! What a genius!". He later appears at the end of the film with the other characters.

Goofy (right) with his son Max (left) in A Goofy Movie (1995)

In the 1990s, Goofy got his own TV series called Goof Troop. In the show, Goofy lives with his son Max and his cat Waffles, and they live next door to Pete and his family. Goof Troop eventually led to Goofy and Max starring in their own movies: A Goofy Movie (in 1995) and An Extremely Goofy Movie (in 2000); as well as starring in their own segments of Mickey's Once Upon a Christmas (in 1999) and Mickey's Twice Upon a Christmas (in 2004). While Goofy is clearly depicted as a single custodial parent in all of these appearances, by the end of An Extremely Goofy Movie he begins a romance with the character Sylvia Marpole, Max being grown and in college by this point.

In one episode of Bonkers, Goofy has an off-screen cameo whose distinctive laugh is "stolen" by a disgruntled toon. In another episode, both he and Pete cameo as actors who film cartoons at Wackytoon Studios. And in a third episode, Goofy cameos as part of a group of civilians held hostage in a bank robbery.

Goofy returned to his traditional personality in Mickey Mouse Works and appeared as a head waiter in House of Mouse (2001 to 2003). Goofy's son Max also appeared in House of Mouse as the nightclub's valet, so that Goofy juggled not only his conventional antics but also the father-role displayed in Goof Troop and its aforementioned related media. In both Mickey Mouse Works and House of Mouse, Goofy also seemed to have a crush on Clarabelle Cow, as he asks her on a date in the House of Mouse episode "Super Goof" and is stalked by the bovine in the Mickey Mouse Works cartoon "How To Be a Spy". Though Clarabelle was noted as Horace Horsecollar's fiancé in early decades, comics from the 1960s and 1970s and in later cartoons like the aforementioned House of Mouse and Mickey Mouse Works, as well as Mickey, Donald, Goofy: The Three Musketeers, imply some mutual affections between Goofy and Clarabelle; perhaps as an attempt for Disney to give Goofy a more mainstream girlfriend to match his two male co-stars.

In the interactive website Toontown Online, Goofy previously ran his own neighborhood called Goofy Speedway until the close of Toontown. Goofy Speedway was a place where players could race cars and enter the Grand Prix. Tickets were exclusively spent on everything there, instead of the usual jellybean currency. The Grand Prix only came on "Grand Prix Monday" and "Silly Saturday". Goofy's Gag Shop was also found in almost every part of Toontown' except Cog HQs, Goofy Speedway, or Chip & Dale's Acorn Acres. At Goofy's Gag Shop, Toons could buy gags.

Goofy also appears in the children's television series, Mickey Mouse Clubhouse, with his trademark attire and personality. Goofy appeared in The Lion King 1½. Goofy starred in a new theatrical cartoon short called How to Hook Up Your Home Theater, that premiered at the Ottawa International Animation Festival. The short received a positive review from animation historian Jerry Beck and then had a wide release on December 21, 2007, in front of National Treasure: Book of Secrets and has aired on several occasions on the Disney Channel.

In 2011, Goofy appeared in a promotional webtoon advertising Disney Cruise Line. He is also a main character on Mickey and the Roadster Racers. He has also appeared in the third season of the 2017 DuckTales TV series; based on his Goof Troop incarnation. Guest starring in the episode, "Quack Pack", Goofy appears as the Duck family's wacky neighbor after Donald accidentally wished them into a '90s sitcom. Donald hires him to be the photographer for a family photo, but after the Ducks realize what Donald did, Goofy helps him understand that "normal" does not necessarily mean the same thing between families; using the relationship he has with his son Max as an example.

In 2021, it was announced that Goofy would star in a new series of "How to..." shorts entitled How to Stay at Home in a reflection of the COVID-19 pandemic. Animator Eric Goldberg (the Genie from Aladdin) served as director of the shorts as well as supervising animator on one of them, while Mark Henn (Belle and Jasmine) and Randy Haycock (Naveen in The Princess and the Frog) served as supervising animators for other shorts. Bill Farmer once again voiced the Goof, with Corey Burton narrating. The shorts "How to Wear a Mask", "Learning to Cook", and "Binge Watching" were released on Disney+ on August 11, 2021.

== Filmography ==
=== Solo short films ===
1. Goofy and Wilbur (1939)
2. Goofy's Glider (1940)
3. Baggage Buster (1941)
4. The Art of Skiing (1941)
5. The Art of Self Defense (1941)
6. How to Play Baseball (1942)
7. The Olympic Champ (1942)
8. How to Swim (1942)
9. How to Fish (1942)
10. El Gaucho Goofy (1943, originally part of Saludos Amigos, 1942)
11. Victory Vehicles (1943)
12. How to Be a Sailor (1944)
13. How to Play Golf (1944)
14. How to Play Football (1944)
15. Tiger Trouble (1945)
16. African Diary (1945)
17. Californy er Bust (1945)
18. Hockey Homicide (1945)
19. A Knight for a Day (1946)
20. Double Dribble (1946)
21. Foul Hunting (1947)
22. They're Off (1948)
23. The Big Wash (1948)
24. Tennis Racquet (1949)
25. Goofy Gymnastics (1949)
26. How to Ride a Horse (1950, originally part of The Reluctant Dragon, 1941)
27. Motor Mania (1950)
28. Hold That Pose (1950)
29. Lion Down (1951)
30. Home Made Home (1951)
31. Cold War (1951)
32. Tomorrow We Diet! (1951)
33. Get Rich Quick (1951)
34. Fathers Are People (1951)
35. No Smoking (1951)
36. Father's Lion (1952)
37. Hello Aloha (1952)
38. Teachers Are People (1952)
39. Two-Gun Goofy (1952)
40. Man's Best Friend (1952)
41. Two Weeks Vacation (1952)
42. How to Be a Detective (1952)
43. Father's Day Off (1953)
44. For Whom the Bulls Toil (1953)
45. Father's Week-end (1953)
46. How to Dance (1953)
47. How to Sleep (1953)
48. Aquamania (1961)
49. Freewayphobia (1965)
50. Goofy's Freeway Troubles (1965)
51. How to Hook Up Your Home Theater (2007)
52. The Art of Vacationing (2012)
53. How to Stay at Home (2021; series of shorts)

=== Theatrical Donald and Goofy cartoons ===
Besides his solo cartoons and supporting roles in Mickey Mouse shorts, Goofy also co-starred with Donald Duck in some theatrical shorts under the Donald & Goofy series (although these are commonly treated as part of the Donald Duck series):

1. Polar Trappers (1938)
2. The Fox Hunt (1938)
3. Billposters (1940)
4. No Sail (1945)
5. Frank Duck Brings 'Em Back Alive (1946)
6. Crazy with the Heat (1947)

=== Feature films ===
1. A Goofy Movie (1995)
2. Mickey's Once Upon a Christmas (1999)
3. An Extremely Goofy Movie (2000)
4. Mickey, Donald, Goofy: The Three Musketeers (2004)
5. Mickey's Twice Upon a Christmas (2004)

=== Movie cameos ===
1. The Falcon Strikes Back (1943) (as a puppet)
2. Who Framed Roger Rabbit (1988)
3. The Little Mermaid (1989)
4. Aladdin (1992) (as a hat)
5. Flubber (1997) (archive footage)
6. The Lion King 1½ (2004)
7. Saving Mr. Banks (2013) (performer in Goofy costume)
8. Chip 'n Dale: Rescue Rangers (2022) (in a billboard)

=== TV specials ===
- Goofy's Success Story (1955)
- Goofy's Cavalcade of Sports (1956)
- Goofy's Sports Story (1957)
- A Disney Halloween (1983)
- Disneyland 30th Anniversary TV Special (1985)
- A Very Merry Christmas Parade (1989)
- Disney's Celebrate The Spirit (1992)
- The Wonderful World Of Disney: 40 Years Of Magic (1994)
- Disneyland 40th Anniversary TV Special (1995)
- Disneyland 50th Anniversary TV Special (2005)
- Disneyland 60th Anniversary TV Special (2015)
- Mickey's Tale of Two Witches (2021)
- Mickey and Minnie Wish Upon a Christmas (2021)
- Mickey Saves Christmas (2022)
- Mickey and Friends Trick or Treats (2023)

== Comics ==
Goofy first appeared in the Mickey Mouse comic strip drawn by Floyd Gottfredson on the Sunday January 8, 1933 panel as Dippy Dawg. He would make his regular daily strip appearance on October 9, 1933. His name was changed to Goofy by 1936. In the early years, the other members of Mickey Mouse's gang considered him a meddler and a pest but eventually warmed up to him.

As Donald Duck's popularity led to Donald Duck gaining his own newspaper strip, Disney decided that he was no longer allowed to appear in Gottfredson's strips. Accordingly, Goofy remained alone as Mickey's sidekick, replacing Horace Horsecollar as Mickey's fellow adventurer and companion. Similarly in comics, the Mickey Mouse world with Goofy as Mickey's sidekick was usually very separate from the Donald Duck world and crossovers were rare. Goofy also has a characteristic habit of holding his hand in front of his mouth, a trademark that was introduced by Paul Murry.

A character called "Glory-Bee" was Goofy's girlfriend for some years.

In 1990, when Disney was publishing their own comics, Goofy starred in Goofy Adventures, that featured him starring in various parodies. Perhaps because of poor sales, Goofy Adventures was the first of the company's titles to be canceled by the Disney Comics Implosion, ending at its 17th issue.

=== Super Goof ===
Super Goof

Publication information
- Publisher: Western Publishing
- First appearance: First version: "The Phantom Blot meets Super Goof" (Walt Disney's The Phantom Blot No. 2, Feb. 1965); Second version: "All's Well that Ends Awful" (Donald Duck No. 102, July 1965); Third and definitive version: "The Thief of Zanzipar" (Walt Disney Super Goof No. 1, Oct. 1965)
- Created by: Del Connell (script, first two versions); Bob Ogle (script, third and definitive version); Paul Murry (art, all three versions)

In-story information
- Alter ego: Goofy
- Team affiliations: Super Gilbert
- Abilities: Can fly, has x-ray vision, invulnerability, super strength, super speed, superbreath, and other powers

Super Goof is Goofy's superhero alter ego who gets his powers by eating super goobers (peanuts). Goofy became the first Disney character to also be a superhero, but several would follow, including Donald Duck as Paperinik.

The initial concept was developed by Disney Publications Dept. head George Sherman and Disney United Kingdom merchandising representative Peter Woods. It was passed on to Western Publishing scripter Del Connell who refined it, including the eventual device of peanuts providing superpowers.

The initial version of Super Goof appeared in "The Phantom Blot meets Super Goof", in Walt Disney's The Phantom Blot No. 2 (Feb. 1965) by Connell (story) and Paul Murry (art). There Goofy mistakenly believes he has developed superpowers. A second version appeared as an actual superhero in the four-page story "All's Well That Ends Awful" in Donald Duck No. 102 (July 1965), also by Connell and Murry.

The third and definitive version debuted in "The Thief of Zanzipar" in Walt Disney Super Goof No. 1 (Oct. 1965), written by Bob Ogle and drawn by Murry, in which the origin of his powers are special peanuts Goofy finds in his backyard. In this story, Super Goof battles the Super Thief, a scientific genius who shrinks world landmarks, and holds them for ransom.

The effect of Super Goof's special peanuts is temporary, so the superpowers wear off after a couple of hours. Many stories use this as a comical effect with the powers wearing off at the most inappropriate time. The peanuts give similar superpowers to whoever eats them, not just Goofy. In some stories, random criminals who have accidentally eaten the peanuts have temporarily become supervillains.

In a crossover story, Huey, Dewey and Louie found a super goober plant sprouted by a dropped goober, and "borrowed" Super Goof's powers; after doing a round of super deeds, the ducks' powers faded, and they had to be rescued by the Junior Woodchucks. On occasion, Gilbert uses the super goobers to become a superhero under the name Super Gilbert, beginning with the story "The Twister Resisters" in Walt Disney Super Goof No. 5.

Gold Key Comics subsequently published the comic-book series Walt Disney Super Goof for 74 issues from October 1965 to July 1984. A handful of stories were scripted by Mark Evanier. Additional Super Goof stories (both original and reprints) appeared in Walt Disney Comics Digest. The Dynabrite comics imprint issued by Western in the late 1970s and Disney Comic Album No. 8 (1990) from Disney Comics contained reprints. Gemstone reprinted a Disney Studio Program story written by Evanier and drawn by Jack Bradbury as a backup in its 2006 release Return of the Blotman.

On Disney's Toontown Online during the Halloween season, Goofy is Super Goof for the occasion. He also appeared in one episode of House of Mouse ("Super Goof") and in two episodes of Mickey Mouse Clubhouse ("Goofy's Super Wish" and "Super Goof's Super Puzzle"). In the television series Mickey Mouse, Goofy dresses as Super Goof for the half-hour Halloween special "The Scariest Story Ever: A Mickey Mouse Halloween Spooktacular!".

== In video games ==
Goofy, as he appears in the Kingdom Hearts series. His attire was designed by series creator Tetsuya Nomura.

Goofy appears in multiple Disney video games, including in starring roles in Goof Troop (1993), Goofy's Hysterical History Tour (1994), Goofy's Fun House (2001) and Disney's Extremely Goofy Skateboarding (2001). His most notable video game appearances are in the Kingdom Hearts franchise, where he is depicted as the captain of the royal guard at Disney Castle. He appears in a prominent role throughout the series as an ally of Sora, appearing in nearly every game in the franchise.

== Voice actors ==
Pinto Colvig voiced Goofy for most of his classic appearances from 1932 (Mickey's Revue) to 1938 (The Whalers) when he had a falling out with Disney and left the company to work on other projects. He was later replaced by Jack Bailey in 1939, and George Johnson from 1940 to 1942 (Johnson would also voice Goofy in No Sail in 1945). However, Colvig returned to Disney and resumed the role in 1944 (How to Be a Sailor) until shortly before his death in 1967. One of his last known performances as the character was for the Telephone Pavilion at Expo 67. Many cartoons featured Goofy silent, recycled dialogue from earlier shorts, or had various different-sounding Goofys instead of the original. Colvig also gave Goofy a normal voice for four George Geef shorts. The famous Goofy holler was originally performed by Austrian skier Hannes Schroll for the 1941 animated short The Art of Skiing.

Stuart Buchanan voiced Goofy in The Mickey Mouse Theater of the Air. Richard Edwards voiced Goofy in the end of Mickey's Trailer and some lines in The Whaler. Jimmy MacDonald, the voice of Mickey Mouse, voiced Goofy in Californy'er Bust, Lion Down and the 1960s Disney album, Donald Duck and his Friends. Cactus Mack provided Goofy's narration voiceover in Californy'er Bust. Bob Jackman took Colvig's place when he left the Disney Studios for unknown reasons and voiced Goofy in 1951 for a brief time. Gilbert Mack voiced Goofy in the 1955 Golden Records record, Goofy the Toreador. Bill Lee provided the singing voice for Goofy on the 1964 record, Children's Riddles and Game Songs. Peter Hawkins voiced Goofy in the ITV children's series Disney Wonderland from 1966 to 1967. Hal Smith began voicing Goofy in 1967 after Pinto Colvig's death and voiced him until Mickey's Christmas Carol in 1983. Walker Edmiston voiced Goofy in the Disneyland record album An Adaptation of Dickens' Christmas Carol, Performed by The Walt Disney Players in 1974. Tony Pope voiced Goofy in the 1979 Disney album Mickey Mouse Disco for the song, "Watch Out for Goofy". He then voiced him in Sport Goofy in Soccermania in 1987 and Who Framed Roger Rabbit in 1988. Jack Wagner voiced Goofy and other Disney characters in the 1980s, primarily for live entertainment offerings in the parks, Disney on Ice shows, and live-action clips for television. Will Ryan did the voice for DTV Valentine in 1986 and Down and Out with Donald Duck in 1987. In the 2021 The Simpsons short Plusaversary (made to celebrate the 2nd anniversary of Disney+), Goofy was voiced by Hank Azaria.

Aside from those occasions, Bill Farmer has been voicing Goofy since 1987. While Tony Pope was the sole voice credit for Goofy in Roger Rabbit, Farmer provided some of Goofy's lines in the film as well. Farmer closely imitated Colvig for projects like The Prince and the Pauper but began putting his own spin on the character in 1992's Goof Troop. Farmer also inherited Colvig's other characters, like Pluto, Sleepy, and Practical Pig. In 2001, Jason Marsden (voice actor of Goofy's son Max) provided the voice of Goofy in the DVD storybook adaptation of the 1994 children's storybook Me and My Dad, included as a bonus feature on the DVD release of An Extremely Goofy Movie.
