= A Knight for a Day =

- Directed by: Jack Hannah
- Story by: Bill Peet
- Produced by: Walt Disney
- Starring: Jack Mather; Arch Denison
- Narrated by: John Brown
- Music by: Oliver Wallace
- Production company: Walt Disney Productions
- Distributed by: RKO Radio Pictures
- Release date: March 8, 1946
- Running time: 7 minutes
- Country: United States
- Language: English

A Knight for a Day is a 1946 Disney short film starring Goofy, which is loosely based on the novel A Connecticut Yankee in King Arthur's Court. Directed by Jack Hannah, this 7-minute animated comedy short was scripted by Bill Peet. While classified as a Goofy cartoon, Goofy himself is not used in this film, but his appearance is used as the basis for all the characters.

== Plot ==
The story takes place at a stadium in medieval Canterbury (which is later incorrectly indicated to be in the British Empire), and features a jousting competition between Sir Loinsteak and Sir Cumference, who is a black knight and the current champion, with a sportscaster-like announcer calling the action of the battle. The prize for the contest is the right to marry Princess Esmeralda.

Due to a pre-bout accident, Sir Loinsteak is knocked out, leaving his loyal and humble squire Cedric to take his place in the tournament. While Sir Cumference dominates the inexperienced simpleton early on, Cedric's unorthodox improvisations gradually begin to tip the scales in his favor. Finally, after launching assaults with his lance, sword, mace, and (surprisingly) a jackhammer, Sir Cumference collapses from exhaustion. Cedric wins by default and is crowned the new champion. Princess Esmeralda leaps down to her new fiancé with glee, while a serf nonchalantly pushes Sir Cumference from the field in a scoop shovel.

== Voice cast ==
- Hawkers, misc.: Jack Mather, Arch Denison
- Narrator: John Brown

== Home media ==
This short is included on the VHS releases of Here's Goofy and The Sword in the Stone and the DVD releases of Volume 3: The Prince & The Pauper and The Sword in the Stone.
