= Mickey's Twice Upon a Christmas =

2004 American animated film

- Film poster
- Directed by: Matthew O'Callaghan
- Screenplay by: Bill Motz; Bob Roth; Peggy Holmes; Chad Fiveash; James Patrick Stoteraux; Matthew O'Callaghan; Shirley Pierce; Jim Peronto; Carole Holliday; Michael Shipley; Jim Bernstein
- Story by: Peggy Holmes; Chad Fiveash; James Patrick Stoteraux; Theresa Pettengill; Carole Holliday; Colin Goldman; Matthew O'Callaghan
- Based on: Mickey Mouse by: Walt Disney; Ub Iwerks; Donald Duck by; Walt Disney; Dick Lundy; Goofy by; Art Babbitt; Frank Webb
- Produced by: Pam Marsden
- Starring: Wayne Allwine; Tony Anselmo; Bill Farmer; Tress MacNeille; Jason Marsden; Jeff Bennett; Jim Cummings; Kellie Martin; Chuck McCann; Clive Revill; Russi Taylor; Alan Young
- Edited by: Julie Rogers; Kirk Demorest
- Music by: Stephen James Taylor
- Production companies: Disneytoon Studios; Blur Studio
- Distributed by: Walt Disney Home Entertainment (Note: Released through the Walt Disney Pictures banner.)
- Release dates: November 9, 2004 (United States); November 15, 2004 (United Kingdom)
- Running time: 67 minutes
- Country: United States
- Language: English

Mickey's Twice Upon a Christmas is a 2004 American direct-to-video animated Christmas anthology comedy fantasy film produced by Disneytoon Studios, Animated By Blur Studio and directed by Matthew O'Callaghan. The film includes stories directed by Peggy Holmes, O'Callaghan, Theresa Cullen, and Carole Holliday.

It is the sequel to Mickey's Once Upon a Christmas (1999). It features Mickey Mouse, Minnie Mouse, Pluto, Goofy, Max, Donald Duck, Daisy Duck, Huey, Dewey, and Louie, and Scrooge McDuck, in five different segments rather than three like its predecessor. Mickey's Twice Upon a Christmas was released by Walt Disney Home Entertainment on November 9, 2004. It received generally mixed reviews from critics.

== Plot ==
The narrator recites the first ten words of The Night Before Christmas before saying, "Oh, wait. Different story, but we'll still see a mouse!" The narrator then announces new tales of giving and loving, and a book opens to show pop-up elves.

=== Belles on Ice ===
In the first story, Minnie Mouse and Daisy Duck compete in an ice-skating competition. The girls are joined by their respective boyfriends, Mickey and Donald, as they prepare to take the ice. Daisy becomes envious of the crowd's reaction to Minnie and attempts to steal the spotlight. Minnie performs several daredevil stunts to regain the spotlight while Daisy summons the Fantasia Hippos, who become her backup skaters while her counterpart summons the alligators from the 1940 film. When Minnie slips while landing from a stunt blindfolded, Daisy helps her up while feeling sorry for her selfish actions. Minnie feels the same way, so they both reconcile and perform a grand finale as a team.

=== Christmas: Impossible ===
The second story tells the story of Huey, Dewey, and Louie celebrating Christmas Eve with Donald and Daisy Duck at Scrooge McDuck's mansion in Duckburg. After they cause trouble at dinnertime, the boys know that they are on the naughty list, so they travel to the North Pole to write their names on Santa's nice list. At Santa's workshop, the trio make a mess while trying to find the key to the room containing Santa's nice list, but they and the elves clean up to save Christmas. Before they leave, they have a chance to add their names to the nice list; however, they add Scrooge's name instead, mindful of the fact that he never made the nice list either. On Christmas, they find a single gift for Scrooge, but Santa leaves a note that explains that their actions caused them to be put on the nice list and more presents are behind the tree.

=== Christmas Maximus ===
The third story's focus is on Max Goof and his father Goofy celebrating the holidays. A young adult Max brings home his girlfriend Mona to meet Goofy. However, Max is embarrassed by his dad, who labels his car a limo, decorates the house with many Christmas lights (including a sign that reads "Welcome Mona" alongside a giant waving Max decoration), shows Max's puppy pictures to Mona, and wipes cocoa off Max's face when he is about to kiss Mona. While wandering outside, he notices that his scarf is made by Goofy and realizes that Goofy is always goofy, and that is why he loves him. Max then forgets about being embarrassed and joins in the fun when the popcorn-making machine goes haywire, causing the house to explode with popcorn and sending Max, Mona, and Goofy to the top of the roof, where they all do snow angels together.

=== Donald's Gift ===
The fourth story focuses on Donald Duck and his Christmas wish of peace and quiet. As he returns home from grocery shopping, he is slowed down by daydreaming and a series of well-wishers who sing "We Wish You a Merry Christmas". Donald becomes increasingly annoyed by the joyous people, and at home, he is annoyed to hear the same Christmas carols on his radio. When Daisy and his nephews arrive, Donald becomes annoyed that they want to go out so soon after he returned home, but Daisy drags him out anyway. At the mall, Donald discovers various objects playing the same Christmas carol; he thinks he is in peace inside a secret room, where he finds animatronics singing. He destroys the entire show at Mousy's that Daisy, Huey, Dewey, Louie, and the crowd were trying to see. After he is thrown out of the mall, Donald walks home alone while feeling guilty for his lack of Christmas spirit. Eventually, he apologizes to everyone for his selfishness and joins the townspeople convened around a Christmas tree happily singing.

=== Mickey's Dog-Gone Christmas ===
The fifth and final story stars Mickey as he makes decorations for the Christmas party, which his dog, Pluto keeps interrupting. When Pluto attempts to help by putting the star on the Christmas tree, he accidentally destroys all the decorations and an exasperated Mickey sends him to his doghouse as a consequence. Feeling rejected, Pluto decides to run away from home and finds himself shipped on a train to the North Pole, where Santa's reindeer adopt him. Back home, Mickey tidies up the mess and redecorates the house with the new Christmas decorations and attempts to reconcile with Pluto, only to find him missing. Meanwhile, Pluto becomes homesick, so Santa and the reindeer help him go home. They complete the Christmas tree decorations, and everyone celebrates Pluto's return.

Like in Once Upon a Christmas, the film concludes with the main characters from the five segments singing "We Wish You a Merry Christmas" as the book closes.

== Voice cast ==
- Wayne Allwine as Mickey Mouse
- Russi Taylor as Minnie Mouse, and Huey, Dewey and Louie
- Tony Anselmo as Donald Duck
- Tress MacNeille as Daisy Duck, and The Female Elf
- Bill Farmer as Goofy and Pluto
- Alan Young as Scrooge McDuck
- Jason Marsden as Max Goof
- Jeff Bennett as Donner, Santa’s Elves, The Janitor Elf, and Jailbreak Bob
- Jim Cummings as Blitzen
- Kellie Martin as Mona
- Chuck McCann as Santa Claus
- Edie McClurg as Santa's Workshop Announcer
- Rob Paulsen as Santa’s Elves, The Security Guard, and The Crying Elf
- Clive Revill as The Narrator
- April Winchell as The Christmas Spectacular Announcer
- Corey Burton as The Radio Host

== Release ==
=== Home media ===
Mickey's Twice Upon a Christmas was first released on DVD and VHS on November 9, 2004. and followed by United Kingdom was released on November 15, 2004. Coinciding with its 10th anniversary, the film was released in a 2-Movie Collection Blu-ray and DVD with its predecessor Mickey's Once Upon a Christmas on November 4, 2014.

The film was made available to stream on Netflix. It was subsequently released on Disney+.

=== Broadcast ===
Mickey's Twice Upon a Christmas aired in the United States on ABC Family in December 2013, and in December 2015. It aired on Freeform in December 2022.

== Reception and legacy ==
=== Critical response ===
Joe Leydon of Variety stated, "All segments are sufficiently brisk to sustain interest of restless small fry. [...] Computer-generated imagery provides pleasingly colorful, seemingly 3-D eye-candy. Even so, novelty value of classic toon characters in CGI format likely will be lost on little ones raised on Shrek and Toy Story." Robert Pardi of TV Guide gave the film a grade of three out of five stars, saying, "A candy-cane palate and a festive soundtrack bolster this omnibus, which allows Disney favorites a chance to strut some new stuff." Rebecka Schumann of International Business Times named Mickey's Twice Upon a Christmas one of their "best Christmas movie picks for kids."

Bryce Olin of FanSided included Mickey's Twice Upon a Christmas in their "Best Christmas Movies on Netflix 2016" list. Michael Thomas of Collider included Mickey's Twice Upon a Christmas in their "Best Holiday Movies and Shows on Disney+" list, stating, "The computer-animated special allows for the Disney crew to shine with each getting major focus across their individual stories. If you love Mickey and his friends, Mickey Twice Upon a Christmas is a wonderful time." Megan Stein of Country Living included Mickey's Twice Upon a Christmas in their "35 Best Christmas Movies on Disney+ to Get You In the Holiday Spirit" list.

People Magazine included Mickey's Twice Upon a Christmas in their "Best Christmas Movies to Stream on Disney+ in 2022" list and called it a "series of heartwarming holiday stories." Korin Miller and Naydeline Mejia of Women's Health included Mickey's Twice Upon a Christmas in their "40 Best Christmas Movies On Disney+" list, asserting, "This animated flick features five Christmas-themed shorts that are all kinds of adorable." Sydni Ellis of PopSugar ranked Mickey's Twice Upon a Christmas first in their "17 Best Holiday Movies to Watch With Little Kids" list.

=== Accolades ===
Year	Award	Category	Nominee(s) and recipient(s)	Result	Ref.
2005	DVD Exclusive Awards	Best Animated Character Performance (Voice and Animation in a DVD Premiere Movie)	Russi Taylor	Nominated	
2005	DVD Exclusive Awards	Best Screenplay (for a DVD Premiere Movie)	Bill Motz, Bob Roth, Peggy Holmes, Chad Fiveash, James Patrick Stoteraux, Matthew O'Callaghan, Shirley Pierce, Jim Peronto, Carole Holliday, Michael Shipley, Jim Bernstein	Nominated	
2005	DVD Exclusive Awards	Best Original Score (for a DVD Premiere Movie)	Stephen James Taylor	Won	

== See also ==
- List of Christmas films
