= The Olympic Champ =

- Directed by: Jack Kinney
- Produced by: Walt Disney
- Starring: George Johnson
- Narrated by: John Mcleish
- Music by: Paul J. Smith
- Color process: Technicolor
- Production company: Walt Disney Productions
- Distributed by: RKO Radio Pictures
- Release date: October 9, 1942; (USA)
- Running time: 7 minutes
- Country: United States
- Language: English

The Olympic Champ is a 1942 Goofy cartoon made by Walt Disney Animation Studios which explains the events in track and field at the Olympic Games.

== Summary ==
The short starts off with Goofy doing the Olympic torch relay to the cauldron and then explains the events in track and field such as pole vault, relay race, shot put, and other events which end Goofy in the trophy area.

== Voice cast ==
- Narrator: John McLeish

== Home media ==
The short was released on December 2, 2002, on Walt Disney Treasures: The Complete Goofy.

Additional releases include:

- The Goofy World of Sports – VHS (1992)
- It's a Small World of Fun! Volume 2 – DVD (2006)
