= Burny Mattinson =

American animator (1935–2023)

- Mattinson in 1983
- Born: Burnett Mattinson; May 13, 1935; San Francisco, California, U.S.
- Died: February 27, 2023 (aged 87); Canoga Park, California, U.S.
- Occupations: Storyboard artist; animator; film director; producer
- Years active: 1953–2023
- Employer: Walt Disney Animation Studios (1953–2023)
- Spouses: Sylvia Fry (m. 1962; died 1986) Ellen Siirola (before 2023)
- Children: 3

Burnett Mattinson (May 13, 1935 – February 27, 2023) was an American animator, director, producer, and story artist for Walt Disney Productions/Walt Disney Animation Studios, where he was employed from 1953 until his death in 2023, making him one of the longest-serving employees in the company's history.

Mattinson was honored as an inductee of the Disney Legends program in 2008. Mattinson was the longest serving employee of The Walt Disney Company, with a career that spanned seven decades.

As a director, Mattinson was nominated for the Academy Award for Best Animated Short Film for Mickey's Christmas Carol (1983). He also co-directed the Disney animated mystery adventure film The Great Mouse Detective (1986).

== Early life ==
Mattinson was born in San Francisco in 1935. His father, Bernie Mattinson, was a jazz drummer who toured with Horace Heidt's big band. His mother had resided in San Jose, California and was working at a theatre there, where she met the drummer. Both parents were of British heritage. Before he was six, his mother took him to see Pinocchio (1940) at the Orpheum Theatre in San Francisco. Mattinson became enamored of animation and began practicing drawing Disney characters throughout his school years. In 1945, the family moved to Los Angeles once his father's band had ended.

After graduating high school, his mother had asked what he wanted to do professionally. Mattinson replied, "Maybe I will try Disney. I will go over there and see about getting a job." His mother dropped him off at the studio gate, where Mattinson handed his portfolio to a security guard. Impressed, the guard immediately called Ken Seiling, the head of Personnel. At the time, there were no available job positions in the studio's animation department, but Mattinson took a job in the traffic department.

== Career ==
After six months in the traffic department, Mattinson began working as an in-betweener on Lady and the Tramp (1955), where he was mentored by Johnny Bond. Following its release, most of the character animators were laid off, but he joined Johnny Walker to work as assistant animators to Marc Davis on Sleeping Beauty (1959). Walker later left, and Mattinson was promoted to the position. There, he worked on the character Maleficent. Reflecting on the experience, Mattinson stated, "We purposely kept her controlled and quiet and we let her dialogue do her acting for us. The reason for this was that we wanted to use those moments of when she exploded as accents that would frighten the audience. We kept her sweet, nice and controlled and then let her blow up on purpose."

For One Hundred and One Dalmatians (1961), Mattinson provided in-between animation; he also drew illustrations for the Little Golden Books adaptation for the film. After another lay-off, Mattinson, at the direction of Andy Engman, was reassigned to work as an assistant to Eric Larson. Under Larson's unit, he animated Ludwig von Drake for The Wonderful World of Color television series. This was soon followed with The Sword and the Stone (1963), Mary Poppins (1964), The Jungle Book (1967) and The Aristocats (1970).

By the 1970s, an internal training program had been initiated to train assistant animators. Mattinson enrolled in the program, delivering an animation test within eight weeks. His animation test of Prince John from Robin Hood (1973) was approved, and Mattinson became a character animator under Ollie Johnston. He next worked on Winnie the Pooh and Tigger Too (1974) animating Kanga, Roo, Tigger, and Rabbit. Meanwhile, Frank Thomas had noticed Mattinson's thumbnail sketches and recommended he work on The Rescuers (1977). Mattinson then worked on storyboards and designed the titles on the film, which he repeated again on The Fox and the Hound (1981) and The Black Cauldron (1985).

On The Black Cauldron (1985), he, Mel Shaw, and several story artists had boarded several sequences, compiling the first two books of The Chronicles of Prydain. During a storyboard meeting, the directors had criticized a sequence Mattinson had boarded—the introduction of Taran and Dallben—claiming that it wasn't ready to move forward into production. Mattinson, known for his congenial personality, then exploded at the directors, which made him feel he had jeopardized his career at Disney. He returned home that night depressed, telling his wife, Sylvia, what had happened. Sylvia then reminded him of a project that Mattinson had been excited about, urging him to "stop talking and start doing". Having long desired to produce a film starring the "Fab Five" (Mickey, Minnie, Donald, Goofy, Pluto), Mattinson remembered the 1974 Disneyland Storyteller album titled An Adaptation of Dickens' Christmas Carol Performed by the Walt Disney Players written by Alan Young (who also performed the voice for Scrooge McDuck).

In March 1981, at his wife's urging, Mattinson sent a two-paragraph pitch letter and the LP record to then-Disney CEO Ron Miller. The next day, Miller called Mattinson into his office, where he angrily inquired about the letter. Mattinson defended his idea, to which Miller dropped the ruse, declaring it was "a great idea" and approved the project. Mattinson was eventually made director and producer on Mickey's Christmas Carol (1983). According to Mattinson, the project was initially conceived as a "24-minute TV special to air annually" starting on Christmas 1982, but an industry-wide animators' strike that same year delayed production. It was later released as a theatrical short attached with the 1983 re-release of The Rescuers (1977). The film was nominated for an Academy Award for Best Animated Short Film in 1984, but lost to Sundae in New York (1983).

The success of Mickey's Christmas Carol led to Mattinson's hiring as a director on The Great Mouse Detective (1986). During production, in 1984, Miller, who had been the film's producer, was forced out as CEO and president, and replaced by Michael Eisner and Frank Wells. Roy E. Disney, who had been the animation department's chairman, promoted Mattinson as producer to replace him. However, Mattinson found both duties as producer and co-director much too laborious, and decided to remain as producer. Ron Clements, by then a story artist, was brought on board as a co-director. During production on Oliver & Company (1988), Mattinson moved to Orlando to briefly work at the newly opened Feature Animation Florida studio in the Disney-MGM Studios theme park to head up the shorts department. There, in search of a new project, the crew decided to complete an unfinished Mickey Mouse short titled Plight of the Bumblebee. Years earlier, in 1981, several elements (including the recorded soundtrack) had been discovered by Daan Jippes. Using the assembled elements, an animatic was filmed and screened to Disney executives, but then-studio chairman Jeffrey Katzenberg declined to complete it.

Throughout the 1990s, Mattinson worked as a storyboard artist on nearly every subsequent Disney theatrical animated film, including Beauty and the Beast (1991), Aladdin (1992), and The Lion King (1994). Around this time, he began working closely with Joe Grant, whom he first met on Beauty and the Beast (1991). Together, along with storyboard artist Vance Gerry, the trio were comically referred as the "Geriatricals", who would pitch adaptations of children's books and develop original story ideas. One of those discarded ideas Mattinson co-developed with Grant was Bitzy, which centered on an Indian elephant who leaves home to start a Hollywood career but ends up working in a used-car lot and falling in love. Mattinson then worked as head of story on Dumbo II, which was later cancelled by John Lasseter.

In 2008, Mattinson was awarded the Disney Legend Award. A year later, directors Stephen Anderson and Don Hall enlisted Mattinson to work as a story supervisor on Winnie the Pooh (2011), due to his earlier involvement with the 1960s featurettes. In March 2011, Mattinson announced that he was pitching an idea for a full-length animated feature with Mickey Mouse as the main protagonist. He further worked as a story consultant on Big Hero 6 (2014) and Ralph Breaks the Internet (2018).

According to Hall, during a story meeting, Mattinson suggested adding a dog character for the Clades in Strange World (2022), which became the character Legend. He made a special posthumous appearance in the Disney short Once Upon a Studio (2023), which celebrates the Walt Disney Company's 100th anniversary in October 2023, released that same month and was dedicated to Mattinson. Mattinson also worked as a story artist for Wish (2023), which was also dedicated to his memory and marks the final film he was involved in prior to his death.

== Personal life and death ==
Mattinson married Sylvia Fry, who also worked as an in-betweener on Sleeping Beauty (1959). They have three children and four grandchildren. At the time of his death, he was married to Ellen Siirola.

Mattinson died in Canoga Park, California, on February 27, 2023, at the age of 87. On June 4, 2023, the Walt Disney Company presented a sculpture, featuring Winnie the Pooh characters, to Mattinson's family on the anniversary of his seven decades-long career. The film Wish and the short film Once Upon a Studio are both dedicated to his memory.

== Filmography ==
| Year | Title | Credited as | | | | | |
| Year | Title | Inbetweener | Character Animator | Animator | Story | Writer/Director/Producer | Story Artist |
|---|---|---|---|---|---|---|---|
| 1955 | Lady and the Tramp | Yes (Note: This role was uncredited.) | No | No | No | No | No |
| 1958 | Paul Bunyan | No | Yes | No | No | No | No |
| 1959 | Sleeping Beauty | No | Yes | No | No | No | No |
| 1960 | Goliath II | No | Yes | No | No | No | No |
| 1961 | One Hundred and One Dalmatians | Yes | No | No | No | No | No |
| 1963 | The Sword in the Stone | No | Yes | No | No | No | No |
| 1964 | Mary Poppins | Yes | No | No | No | No | No |
| 1966 | Winnie the Pooh and the Honey Tree | No | No | Yes | No | No | No |
| 1967 | The Jungle Book | No | No | Yes | No | No | No |
| 1968 | Winnie the Pooh and the Blustery Day | No | No | Yes | No | No | No |
| 1970 | The Aristocats | No | No | Yes | No | No | No |
| 1971 | Bedknobs and Broomsticks | Yes | No | No | No | No | No |
| 1973 | Robin Hood | No | Yes | No | No | No | No |
| 1974 | Winnie the Pooh and Tigger Too | No | No | Yes | No | No | No |
| 1977 | The Many Adventures of Winnie the Pooh | No | No | Yes | No | No | No |
| 1977 | The Rescuers | No | No | No | Yes | No | No |
| 1977 | Pete's Dragon | No | No | No | Yes | No | No |
| 1978 | The Small One | No | No | No | Yes | No | No |
| 1981 | The Fox and the Hound | No | No | No | Yes | No | No |
| 1983 | Winnie the Pooh and a Day for Eeyore | No | No | Yes | No | No | No |
| 1983 | Mickey's Christmas Carol | No | No | No | No | Yes | No |
| 1985 | The Black Cauldron | No | No | No | Yes (Note: Additional story contributions) | No | No |
| 1986 | The Great Mouse Detective | No | No | No | No | Yes | No |
| 1987 | The Brave Little Toaster | No | No | No | Yes | No | No |
| 1990 | The Prince and the Pauper | No | No | No | No | No | Yes (Note: Storyboard artist) |
| 1991 | Beauty and the Beast | No | No | No | Yes | No | No |
| 1992 | Aladdin | No | No | No | Yes | No | No |
| 1994 | The Lion King | No | No | No | Yes | No | No |
| 1995 | Pocahontas | No | No | No | Yes | No | No |
| 1996 | The Hunchback of Notre Dame | No | No | No | Yes | No | No |
| 1998 | Mulan | No | No | No | Yes | No | No |
| 1999 | Tarzan | No | No | No | Yes | No | No |
| 2008 | Tinker Bell | No | No | No | Yes | No | No |
| 2011 | Winnie the Pooh | No | No | No | Yes (Note: Head of story) | No | Yes (Note: Senior story artist and art director) |
| 2014 | Big Hero 6 | No | No | No | No | No | Yes |
| 2018 | Ralph Breaks the Internet | No | No | No | No | No | Yes (Note: Additional story artist) |
| 2022 | Strange World | No | No | No | No | No | Yes |
| 2023 | Wish | No | No | No | No | No | Yes (Note: Posthumous release and was dedicated to him) |

Burny Mattinson also received special thanks for 1988's Oliver & Company and a posthumous live-action cameo and dedication in 2023's Once Upon a Studio.

== Bibliography ==
- Ghez, Didier (2012). "Burny Mattinson". Walt's People: Volume 12—Talking Disney with the Artists Who Knew Him. Xlibris. pp. 514–550. ISBN 978-1-4771-4789-4.
- Kaytis, Clay (2006). "Burny Mattinson". In Ghez, Didier (ed.). Walt's People: Volume 9—Talking Disney with the Artists who Knew Him. Theme Park Press. pp. 416–472. ISBN 978-1-4500-8746-9.
- Renaut, Christian (2015). "Interview with Burny Mattinson". In Ghez, Didier (ed.). Walt's People: Volume 3—Talking Disney with the Artists Who Knew Him. Theme Park Press. pp. 238–242. ISBN 978-1-9415-0045-3.
