= Dick N. Lucas =

American film animator

Dick Lucas
- Born: Richard Norcom Lucas; July 20, 1920; Los Angeles, California
- Died: August 27, 1997 (aged 77); Los Osos, California
- Occupation(s): Animator, storyboard artist, effects animator
- Years active: 1942–1982
- Spouse: Muriel
- Children: 2

Richard Norcom "Dick" Lucas (July 20, 1920 – August 27, 1997) was an American animator and storyboard artist, noteworthy as part of Walt Disney Productions.

== Biography ==
Lucas studied at the Chouinard Art Institute, and in 1942, he was hired to work at the Disney Studios based on a personal recommendation from Walt Disney. There, he worked as an inbetweener and character animator on The Three Caballeros (1944), Cinderella (1950), Alice in Wonderland (1951), Peter Pan (1953), Lady and the Tramp (1955), The Sword in the Stone (1963), The Jungle Book (1967) and The Rescuers (1977). Lucas also worked as an effects animator for One Hundred and One Dalmatians (1961) and The Fox and the Hound (1981), and as a storyboard artist for the short film Winnie the Pooh and the Honey Tree (1966). In addition, he built superb scale models for the animators in the Nine Old Men the way Bob Jones, Wah Chang, Lorna Soderstrom and Duke Russell had done for Pinocchio (1940). Lucas retired from Disney in 1982.

On August 27, 1997, Lucas died at his home in Los Osos, California, aged 77.

== Filmography ==
Year	Title	Credits	Notes
1955	The Goofy Success Story	Animator	
1956	The Goofy Sports Story	Animator	
1957	The Adventure Story (Short)	Animator	
1957	How to Relax (Short)	Animator	
1957	The Truth About Mother Goose (Short)	Animator	
1959	Sleeping Beauty	Character animator	Uncredited
1960	Goliath II (Short)	Character animator	
1961	One Hundred and One Dalmatians	Character animator	
1961	Aquamania (Short)	Character animator	
1961	Holiday for Henpecked Husbands (Short)	Animator	Episode of Walt Disney's Wonderful World of Color
1963	The Sword in the Stone	Character animator	
1966	Winnie the Pooh and the Honey Tree (Short)	Story	
1967	The Jungle Book	Character animator	Story artist (uncredited)
1970	The Aristocats	Effects animator	
1977	The Rescuers	Effects animator	
1981	The Fox and the Hound	Character animator	
