= John Lounsbery =

American animator (1911–1976)

- Born: John Mitchell Lounsbery; March 9, 1911; Cincinnati, Ohio, U.S.
- Died: February 13, 1976 (aged 64); Los Angeles, California, U.S.
- Occupations: Animator; Director
- Known for: One of Disney's Nine Old Men

John Mitchell Lounsbery (March 9, 1911 - February 13, 1976) was an American animator and director employed by Walt Disney Productions. He is best known as one of Disney's Nine Old Men, of which he was the shortest lived as well as the first to die.

== Life and career ==
He was born on March 9, 1911, in Cincinnati, Ohio, and raised in Colorado. He attended East Denver High School and the Art Institute of Denver. While attending the ArtCenter College of Design in Los Angeles, an instructor sent him to interview with Walt Disney.

Lounsbery was hired by Disney on July 2, 1935, beginning as an uncredited assistant animator on Snow White and the Seven Dwarfs (1937). He went on to work on numerous short features in the 1940s while continuing to serve as part of the animating team on nearly all of Disney's most famous feature-length animated films. In the 1970s, he was promoted to director and directed the short film Winnie the Pooh and Tigger Too (1974) and co-directed The Rescuers (1977).

Lounsbery died on February 13, 1976, at age 64. At the time of his death, he was working on The Rescuers and still directing at the Walt Disney Studios. He was named a Disney Legend in 1989 and was buried at the Forest Lawn, Hollywood Hills Cemetery in Los Angeles.

== Filmography ==
Year	Title	Credits	Characters	Notes
1940	Pinocchio	Animator		
1940	Fantasia	Animator - Segment "Dance of the Hours"		
1941	Dumbo	Animation Director		
1943	Victory Through Air Power (Documentary)	Animator		
1944	The Three Caballeros	Animator		
1945	The Legend of Coyote Rock (Short)	Animator		
1945	Canine Patrol (Short)	Animator		
1946	Make Mine Music	Animator		
1946	Song of the South	Directing Animator		
1947	Fun and Fancy Free	Directing Animator		
1948	Melody Time	Directing Animator		
1948	So Dear to My Heart	Animator		
1949	The Adventures of Ichabod and Mr. Toad	Directing Animator		
1950	Cinderella	Directing Animator		
1951	Alice in Wonderland	Directing Animator		
1952	Lambert the Sheepish Lion (Short)	Animator		
1953	Peter Pan	Directing Animator		
1953	Ben and Me (Short)	Animator		
1955	Lady and the Tramp	Directing Animator		
1955 - 1982	The Magical World of Disney (TV Series)	Animator / Director - 13 Episodes		
1959	Sleeping Beauty	Directing Animator		
1960	Goliath II (Short)	Directing Animator		
1961	One Hundred and One Dalmatians	Directing Animator		
1961	Aquamania (Short)	Animator		
1963	The Sword in the Stone	Directing Animator		
1964	Mary Poppins	Animator		
1966	Winnie the Pooh and the Honey Tree (Short)	Animator		
1967	The Jungle Book	Directing Animator		
1968	Winnie the Pooh and the Blustery Day (Short)	Animator		
1970	The Aristocats	Directing Animator		
1971	Bedknobs and Broomsticks	Animator		
1973	Robin Hood	Directing Animator		
1974	Winnie the Pooh and Tigger Too (Short)	Director		
1977	The Many Adventures of Winnie the Pooh	Animator / Director		
1977	The Rescuers	Director		
