= Winnie the Pooh (song) =

1966 music and lyrics by Sherman Brothers performed by Thurl Ravenscroft

Song by The Disney Chorus

from the album Winnie the Pooh and the Honey Tree
- Released: 1966
- Songwriter: Robert B. Sherman & Richard M. Sherman

"Winnie the Pooh" is the title song for the franchise of the same name. The Academy-Award winning songwriters are the Sherman Brothers, who have written the majority of Winnie the Pooh music since 1966, after they wrote the music and lyrics in Mary Poppins.

The song has been used in most Pooh merchandising since it was published in 1966. It first appeared in the musical film featurette Winnie the Pooh and the Honey Tree. The lyric gives an overview of the characters and their roles in relation to Winnie the Pooh. The song has been used in every theatrically released Pooh film and most of the television series, generally in the title sequence. The song was also performed by Carly Simon and Ben Taylor on the soundtrack of Piglet's Big Movie (2003). A music video was released for this version and it was included in The Many Adventures of Winnie the Pooh (2007) DVD.

Tigger is the only original book character not named in this song, as he was absent in Winnie the Pooh and the Honey Tree. He gets his own introduction song, "The Wonderful Thing About Tiggers", in Winnie the Pooh and the Blustery Day and Winnie the Pooh and Tigger Too. The version for the 2011 film, performed by Zooey Deschanel, finally names Tigger, after Kanga and Roo, adding: "and Tigger, too."
