= Wolfgang Reitherman =

German-American animator (1909–1985)

- Reitherman in 1940
- Born: June 26, 1909; Munich, Kingdom of Bavaria, German Empire
- Died: May 22, 1985 (aged 75); Burbank, California, U.S.
- Other names: Woolie Reitherman; Wooly Reitherman
- Education: Pasadena Junior College; Chouinard Art Institute
- Occupations: Animator; director; producer
- Years active: 1933–1981
- Employer: Walt Disney Productions (1933–1942, 1947–1981)
- Known for: One of Disney's Nine Old Men
- Spouse: Janie Marie McMillan (m. 1946)
- Children: 3, including Bruce Reitherman

Wolfgang Reitherman (June 26, 1909 – May 22, 1985), sometimes credited or casually referred to as Woolie Reitherman, was a German-American animator, director and producer. As a member of the "Nine Old Men" at Walt Disney Productions, Reitherman was known for his action-oriented animation sequences.

Born in Munich, Reitherman relocated to the United States with his family in 1911. He attended Pasadena Junior College and afterwards worked as a draftsman for Douglas Aircraft Company. Desiring a career in visual arts, Reitherman studied at the Chouinard Art Institute. On the advice of an art instructor, Reitherman was hired as an animator for Walt Disney Productions. Reitherman animated on several Silly Symphonies cartoon shorts. He next animated the Slave in the Magic Mirror in Snow White and the Seven Dwarfs (1937), Monstro in Pinocchio (1940), and the climactic dinosaur fight in Igor Stravinsky's "Rite of Spring" segment of Fantasia (1940).

In 1941, Reitherman enlisted in the United States Army Air Forces (USAAF) during World War II. While in the military, he flew on several combat missions and was awarded the Distinguished Flying Cross. Following World War II, Reitherman returned to the Disney studios as an animator in 1947. Within a few years, he became a member of Disney's "Nine Old Men". Reitherman made his directorial debut with the 1957 short film The Truth About Mother Goose. In 1963, Reitherman became the first sole director for a Disney animated feature, with The Sword in the Stone (1963).

During production on The Jungle Book (1967), Walt Disney died, and Reitherman assumed the creative leadership, remaining as director and producer on several consecutive Disney animated feature films until The Rescuers (1977). Additionally, he directed the featurettes: Winnie the Pooh and the Honey Tree (1966) and Winnie the Pooh and the Blustery Day (1968), which won the Academy Award for Best Animated Short Film.

By 1977, Reitherman had intended to direct The Fox and the Hound (1981), but he left the project after having creative differences with Art Stevens. After developing unproduced animation projects, Reitherman retired from Disney in 1981. In 1983, he was awarded the Winsor McCay Award. In 1985, Reitherman died in a single-car accident. He was posthumously honored as a Disney Legend in 1989.

== Early life ==
Wolfgang Reitherman was born on June 26, 1909, in Munich, German Empire to Philip Reitherman and Marie Keuhner. He was the final child born of seven children. Philip and Marie had eloped and married in London and lived briefly in France, before returning to Munich. In 1911, owing to political unrest, the family relocated to the United States when he was a child, where they first settled in Kansas City, Missouri, where one of Philip's brothers had lived. At home, English was the preferred language, and as a result of his parents' assimilation, Wolfgang understood little German.

They next moved to Sierra Madre, California. As a young man, Reitherman had a passion for flying and aspired to become an aeronautical engineer; as a hobby, he drew cartoon gags. He attended Pasadena Junior College, but left to work as a draftsman for the Douglas Aircraft Company. By 1931, Reitherman had decided he would rather be an artist than an engineer, and soon enrolled into the Chouinard Art Institute.

== Career ==
=== 1933–1946: Animator and military service ===
While Reitherman was studying at Chouinard Art Institute, his paintings attracted the attention of Philip L. Dike, a drawing and painting instructor. Impressed with his artwork, Dike showed them to Disney, after which Reitherman was invited to the studio. He initially wanted to work as a watercolorist, but Walt Disney suggested he should be an animator. Reitherman was hired at Walt Disney Productions on May 21, 1933. His first project as an animator was the Silly Symphonies cartoon Funny Little Bunnies (1934). Reitherman worked on numerous animated shorts, including The Band Concert (1935), Music Land (1935), and Elmer Elephant (1936). He animated the Slave in the Magic Mirror in Snow White and the Seven Dwarfs (1937).

Reitherman's next assignments were animating Monstro in Pinocchio (1940) and the climactic dinosaur fight in Igor Stravinsky's "Rite of Spring" segment of Fantasia (1940). The night he had finished his animation, Reitherman attended a Christmas staff party and played a tape recording of Stravinsky's piece in reverse. He remembered, "anyway, there's a knock on the door, and someone goes over to answer it, and standing there is Walt ... with Igor Stravinsky. But, he [Stravinsky] was very nice. He said, 'Sounds good backwards, too.' and left."

Reitherman then followed up with animating several scenes of Timothy Q. Mouse in Dumbo (1941). In December 1941, Pearl Harbor was bombed, and Reitherman, at the age of 32, enlisted into the United States Army Air Forces (USAAF) as a pilot. While in service, he participated in the Air Transport Command in Africa, China, India, and the Philippines. Reitherman remembered living in China at one point, stating, "I was flying all the time, so I wasn't there all that time. A wonderful country. Wonderful people." He was honorably discharged in February 1946, having earned the military rank of Major. After several years of service, Reitherman was awarded the Distinguished Flying Cross and the Air Medal with one bronze oak leaf cluster.

=== 1947–1955: Return to Disney ===
Reitherman rejoined the Disney studios in April 1947, where he animated the Headless Horseman chase sequence in The Legend of Sleepy Hollow section of The Adventures of Ichabod and Mr. Toad (1949), alongside John Sibley. Around this time, Reitherman claimed he was instrumental in helping Walt Disney commit to producing Cinderella (1950) as an animated film. After he had glanced at some storyboards, Reitherman recalled, "I just went in his office, which I rarely did, and I said, 'Gee, that looks great. We ought to do it.' It might have been a little nudge to say, 'Hey, let's get going again and let's do a feature'."

On Cinderella, Reitherman was the directing animator of the sequence in which Jaq and Gus laboriously push and pull the key up the stairs to Cinderella. By this point, Disney began devoting less time and energy into animation, as he sought to expand into developing an amusement theme park and television projects. Nine veteran animators—Les Clark, Marc Davis, Ollie Johnston, Milt Kahl, Ward Kimball, Eric Larson, John Lounsbery, Reitherman, and Frank Thomas—began to consolidate and were known as the "Nine Old Men", in reference to U.S. President Franklin D. Roosevelt's denigration of the Supreme Court. As it became harder to get Disney to attend story meetings, animation responsibilities was increasingly left to their creative judgment.

On Alice in Wonderland (1951), Reitherman animated the scene in which the White Rabbit's home is destroyed by an enlarged Alice. On Peter Pan (1953), he animated the scene of Captain Hook attempting to escape the crocodile. For Lady and the Tramp (1955), Reitherman animated the alley dog fight sequence and Tramp's fight with the rat in the nursery room. Animation historian Charles Solomon praised the alley sequence, writing, it is "a textbook example of a Reitherman fight scene: Tramp defeats a pack of vicious mongrels to save Lady, helpless in her muzzle." Reitherman also appeared as himself in a Disneyland episode "A Story of Dogs", reenacting a production meeting about the alley dog fight sequence, which aired on December 1, 1954.

=== 1955–1977: Directing career ===
==== Theatrical shorts, Sleeping Beauty, One Hundred and One Dalmatians ====
In 1957, Reitherman made his directorial debut with the short film The Truth About Mother Goose, which was nominated for the Academy Award for Best Animated Short Film, but it lost to the Merrie Melodies cartoon Birds Anonymous. He later joined the production team working on Sleeping Beauty (1959). Reitherman's colleague Eric Larson had been the film's sole director until he was removed from the project by 1957. Clyde Geronimi became the film's new supervising director. Reitherman joined the project as a sequence director for Prince Phillip's climactic fight against Maleficent as a dragon. Years later, in 1981, Reitherman told the Los Angeles Times: "We took the approach that we were going to kill that damned prince!" Released in 1959, Sleeping Beauty underperformed at the box office and earned mixed reviews from film critics. Bosley Crowther, in his New York Times review, warned the dragon fight sequence "will make a few adults groan. Mr. Disney here reaches the apex of his build-up of animated horror." The fight sequence has since been praised as among the finest in Disney animation.

Reitherman next directed the 1960 short film Goliath II, which has the distinction of being the first Disney animation project to fully use the Xerox process by transferring the animators' drawings directly onto transparent cels. Simultaneously, Reitherman directed the "Twilight Bark" sequence for One Hundred and One Dalmatians (1961), serving as a sequence director alongside Geronimi and Hamilton Luske. That same year, he solely directed a Goofy cartoon short, Aquamania (1961).

==== The Sword in the Stone ====
The Sword in the Stone had been a film project Walt Disney first acquired in 1939, following the success of Snow White and the Seven Dwarfs. It had been long delayed in development for over two decades. With a new policy in place, it was decided that one feature-length animated film would be released within three or four years with an occasional special project. An attempt to adapt the medieval fable Chanticleer and the Fox had been rejected in favor of The Sword in the Stone. Contemporary studio publicity materials reported that Reitherman was the first sole director over a Disney animated feature, which was in direct contrast to having multiple directors over an animated feature. However, further research has disproven this, as David Hand had been a supervising director.

Animator Ward Kimball claimed Reitherman was selected due to his work compatibility and willingness to accept any project "with a smile". Animator Bob Carlson quoted Disney as stating, "Whenever I want to know what the public thinks about a film I'm making, I ask Woolie, because in a way he's the All-American boy." The animation staff was further streamlined with one director (Reitherman), one art director (Ken Anderson), one story director (Bill Peet), and four supervising animators (Ollie Johnston, Milt Kahl, John Lounsbery, Frank Thomas).

As director, Reitherman was heavily involved in casting and directing the voice talent. In 1963, he stated, "After the story man or artist has made the original concept of a character, the voice comes next. It is of upmost importance, because the animator has to be stimulated by the voice; he has little else to work with." During the film's production, Rickie Sorensen, who had been cast as Arthur, entered puberty, which forced Reitherman to cast two of his sons, Richard and Robert, to record the remaining dialogue.

Released in December 1963, The Sword in the Stone earned an estimated $4.75 million in box office rentals in the United States and Canada.

==== The Jungle Book ====
Walt Disney first considered making an animated version of Rudyard Kipling's 1894 collection of stories The Jungle Book during the late 1930s. Bob Thomas's 1958 book The Art of Animation revealed Disney's public intentions to adapt The Jungle Book into an animated feature film. In 1962, Disney acquired the film rights to the original short stories, but decided to concentrate on the stories involving Mowgli. Disney once again assigned Bill Peet to handle the storyboards, while Reitherman directed. By the end of 1963, Disney was dissatisfied with Peet's story outline and overall vision, citing a lack of warmth in the characters. One of the crucial disagreements was the casting of Phil Harris as the character Baloo. On January 29, 1964—his 49th birthday—Peet had his final meeting with Disney, in which they clashed. He left the studio shortly after deciding to become a children's author.

"Walt had developed this style of personality animation and that's what he always worked to exploit to the fullest. If something had to give between story and character, it has to be story."

— Reitherman, 1967

Meanwhile, Disney selected Reitherman to direct the short film Winnie the Pooh and the Honey Tree (1966) with the prospect he would Americanize the characters and include more humor. According to film historian Christopher Finch, Reitherman was less than thrilled to direct the project. Nevertheless, he cast his son, Bruce, who was also voicing Mowgli, to voice Christopher Robin and added an original character named Gopher. Released in 1966, Winnie the Pooh and the Honey Tree was released as a supplemental feature with The Ugly Dachshund. It was well received by audiences, and Disney approved production of a follow-up sequel.

While directing The Jungle Book (1967), Reitherman followed the procedure to keep production costs low, in which he recalled Disney advising him to "keep the costs down because [feature cartoons are] going to price themselves out of business." On December 15, 1966, Disney died from lung cancer, at the age of 65. Less than two weeks later, Reitherman, art director Ken Anderson, story artists Don DaGradi and Vance Gerry, and studio executives Bill Anderson, Winston Hibler, and Bill Walsh held a meeting to discuss work on the next animated feature The Aristocats (1970). By April 1967, they had arrived at a simplified plot outline by paring down the number of characters.

In October 1967, The Jungle Book was released to critical acclaim for its musical sequences and voice performances despite a meandering storyline. Within three years, by 1970, the film had earned $23.8 million in worldwide box office rentals, becoming the most successful animated film released during its initial run.

Before The Aristocats entered production, a Winnie the Pooh follow-up short, now subtitled Blustery Day, was decided to become the first post-Walt Disney animation project. Under the new circumstances, the "Nine Old Men" animators Frank Thomas, Ollie Johnston, and Milt Kahl joined the project. Reitherman remained as director, but his attitude to the series had changed, by which he decided to be more faithful to the source material. He encouraged the animators to find more inspiration from the original stories. Johnston observed, "Woolie was sometimes reluctant to accept fresh ideas. You'd have to work hard to persuade him to try something new, but once you'd demonstrated that your idea made sense he'd back up one hundred percent."

Released in December 1968, Winnie the Pooh and the Blustery Day was attached to the live-action film The Horse in the Gray Flannel Suit, and considered as the superior Winnie the Pooh short by both American and British film critics. At the 41st Academy Awards, Blustery Day was the recipient for Best Animated Short Film. Reitherman accepted the award on behalf of Walt Disney.

==== The Aristocats ====
"This was survival as far as I was concerned and most of the animators were concerned. It was survival to keep this thing going, this thing called Disney animation."

— Reitherman, 1983

Following Disney's death, there was discussion amongst studio executives to close the animation department. Reitherman credited film producer Bill Anderson for understanding "the value of animation" and allowing him and the animators to have free rein over The Aristocats. Production on the film continued with Ken Anderson reflecting: "we would find ourselves asking, 'How would Walt react to this?' or 'What would Walt do?'"

In an interview with the El Paso Times, Reitherman explained, "Walt wasn't there to make the final decisions. You didn't know whether you were right or not in your creative judgment. Walt left no doubt. He always let you know. Consequently, there were more story problems on this show than any other."

According to animation historian Jim Hill, Reitherman was not sympathetic to Walt Disney's earlier heartfelt approach to the story, in which Duchess would find suitable human owners befitting for her kittens' talent. Instead, he had the story retooled into an adventure comedy akin to One Hundred and One Dalmatians (1961). To save on production costs, and to deliver the film on time, Reitherman made considerable story changes that alienated some of the production staff, most notably the Sherman Brothers. Thomas O'Malley's character design was altered from being an orange-colored striped calico cat into a brown-and-white alley cat. Elvira, a maid character, was removed from the story placing Edgar as the central villain in order to better simplify the storyline.

With The Aristocats, Reitherman relied heavily on the remaining four of the "Nine Old Men" animators to visualize each scene, as he struggled with the responsibility and had disliked reviewing storyboard reels. In 1987, Frank Thomas explained: "Woolie never liked story reels because he said they gave you the wrong idea. You can have one concept in your mind and the story reel will seem to support that, and yet the guy who made the story reel has an entirely different concept." Also, there was a noticeable softening of Disney villains, with the result that nearly all of them over the next two decades were more comical or pitiful than scary. According to Andreas Deja, Reitherman stated that "if we lose the kids, we lose everything".

Released in December 1970, The Aristocats was a box office success, earning over $10 million in box office rentals from the United States and Canada, and $16 million from international markets, against a production budget of $4 million.

==== Robin Hood ====
In October 1968, Ken Anderson accompanied then-Disney president Card Walker on a fishing trip who suggested a classic tale should be the subject for the next animated film. Anderson proposed the Robin Hood legend, to which Walker responded positively. Anderson relayed the idea during an Aristocats story meeting, and was quickly assigned to create character designs. Anderson had an entirely different vision for Robin Hood (1973), loosely adapting the film to be set in the American Deep South. He had also wanted to include Robin Hood's outlaw group the Merry Men. Reitherman disagreed, and had the film set in its traditional English setting. He further pared down the number of outlaws to just Robin Hood and Little John, envisioning the film as a "buddy picture" similar to Butch Cassidy and the Sundance Kid (1969), which had been released during the film's production.

"I detest the use of—it just breaks my heart to see animation from Snow White used in The Rescuers. It kills me, and it just embarrasses me to tears."

— Milt Kahl, 1976

During his directorial tenure, Reitherman allowed for "recycled" or limited animation from prior animated films to be used. These drawings were stored in a makeshift archive known as the "Morgue", which was located near the basement of the Ink and Paint department. It has been presumed this practice was done to save on time and production costs, though it was in fact more labor-intensive. Floyd Norman, an animator who had worked under Reitherman, explained that it was actually easier and less time-consuming for character animators to create original drawings.

Nevertheless, Reitherman's use of recycling animation proved to be controversial within the studio. In a 1976 interview, animator Milt Kahl recalled during a publicity tour for Robin Hood, a publicist for Paramount Pictures approached him, as he had recognized repurposed animation from Snow White and the Seven Dwarfs used in Robin Hood. Kahl later bemoaned: "This is our Woolie, and it drives me crazy." Despite the similarities in technique, this animation process is not the same as rotoscoping.

Released in November 1973, Robin Hood was a box office success, earning $9.6 million in rentals in the United States and Canada.

==== The Rescuers ====
In 1973, Reitherman told John Culhane, a journalist, that he had been open to recruiting younger animation artists: "We wanted to get talented guys in here and give them a well-rounded experience. Let them spend time with us. Then, if they can learn to get good personalities on their characters, find good voices, develop a storyline you can follow and situations that are sparkling—that's all we can hand off to them." By 1970, Eric Larson, one of the "Nine Old Men" animators, was selected to head the animation training program. Across the United States, he toured various art schools and colleges, scouting for art students to become animators. Eventually, more than 60 artists were brought into the training program.

As a project for the new animators, the 1974 short Winnie the Pooh and Tigger Too went into production, with Frank Thomas, Ollie Johnston, Milt Kahl and John Lounsbery returning to animate. They were joined by younger animators, including Don Bluth and Andy Gaskill. This time, Lounsbery was the director for the film. According to Ron Clements, Ron Miller, Walt Disney's son-in-law and senior vice president, had concerns about Reitherman assuming too much creative autonomy. He stated, "John Lounsbery was sort of imposed just to break up Woolie's control of everything." According to Mel Shaw, Miller had intended to have Lounsbery succeed Reitherman as director when he retired. Tigger Too was nominated for another Academy Award for Best Animated Short Film, but lost to Closed Mondays.

The Rescuers tells of two mice Bernard and Bianca, of the Rescuers Aid Society, who are enlisted to rescue Penny, a young girl, from captivity in the southern bayous by Madame Medusa, who desires a prized diamond enclosed inside a cave. Reitherman co-directed the film, alongside Lounsbery. However, on February 13, 1976, Lounsbery died of a heart attack during production, at the age of 64. Art Stevens, an animator, was then selected as the new co-director.

Frustrated by Reitherman's leadership and creative decisions, Milt Kahl finished his animation scenes for the film and retired on April 3, 1976. Released in June 1977, The Rescuers was heralded as a creative comeback and valediction for the senior Disney animators. It had earned $15 million in distributor rentals from the United States and Canada at the box office.

=== 1977–1984: The Fox and the Hound, unproduced projects, and retirement ===
Following The Rescuers, Reitherman was initially slated to direct The Fox and the Hound (1981). A loose adaptation of the 1967 novel by Daniel P. Mannix, the film tells of the friendship between Tod, a red fox, and Copper, a bloodhound dog, who become natural enemies as they mature as adults. Reitherman had read the original novel and placed the adaptation into active production, as one of his sons had once owned a pet fox years prior. Frank Thomas and Ollie Johnston, the last two remaining "Nine Old Men" animators, contributed animation to the film before retiring to publish their 1981 joint book Disney Animation: The Illusion of Life. During production, Reitherman was assisted by Art Stevens, the film's co-director. However, Reitherman largely shut out Stevens from the creative responsibilities.

The animators were divided into two factions, some of whom supported Reitherman while another supported Stevens. Looking to retool the film's second half, Reitherman decided to add a goofy musical sequence of two swooping cranes, with the voices of Phil Harris and Charo, who would cheer up Tod after he was dropped off at the game reserve. Stevens complained about the sequence feeling out of place, and it was eventually removed. Stevens further complained to Ron Miller, which resulted in Miller telling Reitherman: "You're over 70 years old, back off and leave it to the young guys." Reitherman decided to step down as director and remain on as co-producer. Ted Berman and Richard Rich joined The Fox and the Hound as the new co-directors.

Shortly after, Reitherman began developing a film adaptation of Catfish Bend, based on the book series by Ben Lucien Burman. In 1980, the Los Angeles Times reported that Reitherman and artist Mel Shaw were developing Musicana, a follow-up anthology project to Fantasia (1940). That same year, Reitherman developed an adaptation of the children's novel The Little Broomstick by Mary Stewart, but it was perceived as being too similar to Bedknobs and Broomsticks (1971). Further development was discontinued due to The Black Cauldron (1985) advancing into production.

In 1981, after The Fox and the Hound had been released, Reitherman told the Los Angeles Times he had retired from Disney: "They asked me not to say I quit. It made it sound like I was mad. The studio has been good to me. And I'm awfully happy to have been part of it." In 1983, he was awarded the Winsor McCay Award.

== Personal life and death ==
In 1946, while Reitherman was piloting for the Far East Air Transport, he met Janie Marie McMillan, who was serving as the chief air stewardess. After World War II ended, Reitherman received an honorable discharge in February 1946. Three months after meeting her, Reitherman married McMillan on November 26, 1946, in Manila.

All three of Reitherman's sons—Bruce, Richard and Robert—provided voices for Disney characters, including Mowgli in The Jungle Book, Christopher Robin in Winnie the Pooh and the Honey Tree, and Wart in The Sword in the Stone. In 1971, his wife, Janie started her own travel agency in Burbank, which existed for more than two decades and specialized in trips to Asia. With an office staff of five, Reitherman occasionally assisted in the agency.

On May 22, 1985, while Reitherman and his wife were planning a three-week vacation to Maui, Reitherman apparently suffered cardiac arrest two blocks away from his Burbank, California residence, while driving from a bank. His vehicle veered to the right, then struck a tree. Reitherman was rushed to nearby St. Joseph Medical Center, where he was pronounced dead from injuries related to the single-car accident. He was 75 years old.

Reitherman was posthumously named a Disney Legend in 1989.

== Filmography ==
Year	Title	Credits	Characters	Notes
1937	Snow White and the Seven Dwarfs	Animator		Credited as Woolie Reitherman
1940	Pinocchio	Animation Director		Credited as Woolie Reitherman
1940	Fantasia	Animation Supervisor - Segment "Rite of Spring"		
1941	The Reluctant Dragon	Animator		
1941	Dumbo	Animation Director		Credited as Woolie Reitherman
1942	Saludos Amigos	Animator		Credited as Wooly Reitherman
1947	Fun and Fancy Free	Directing Animator		
1949	The Adventures of Ichabod and Mr. Toad	Directing Animator		
1949	Goofy Gymnastics (Short)	Animator		
1949	Tennis Racquet (Short)	Animator		
1950	Cinderella	Directing Animator		
1951	Alice in Wonderland	Directing Animator		
1953	Peter Pan	Directing Animator		
1953	Ben and Me (Short)	Animator		
1955	Lady and the Tramp	Directing Animator		
1957	The Truth About Mother Goose (Documentary short)	Director		
1959	Sleeping Beauty	Sequence Director		
1959	Donald in Mathmagic Land (Short)	Sequence Director		
1960	Goliath II (Short)	Director		
1961	One Hundred and One Dalmatians	Director		
1961	Aquamania (Short)	Director		
1963	The Sword in the Stone	Director		
1966	Winnie the Pooh and the Honey Tree (Short)	Director		
1967	The Jungle Book	Director		
1968	Winnie the Pooh and the Blustery Day (Short)	Director		
1970	The Aristocats	Director and Producer		
1973	Robin Hood	Director and Producer		
1974	Winnie the Pooh and Tigger Too (Short)	Producer		
1977	The Many Adventures of Winnie the Pooh	Director and Producer		
1977	The Rescuers	Director and Producer		
1981	The Fox and the Hound	Co-Producer		Final Screen Credit

== Sources ==
- Barrier, Michael (1999). Hollywood Cartoons: American Animation in Its Golden Age. Oxford University Press. ISBN 978-0-198-02079-0.
- Barrier, Michael (2008). The Animated Man: A Life of Walt Disney. University of California Press. ISBN 978-0-520-25619-4.
- Canemaker, John (2001). "Wolfgang Reitherman". Walt Disney's Nine Old Men and the Art of Animation. Disney Editions. pp. 31–53. ISBN 978-0-786-86496-6.
- Culhane, John (June 1977). "The Last of the 'Nine Old Men'". American Film. pp. 10–16.
- Deja, Andreas (2015). The Nine Old Men: Lessons, Techniques, and Inspiration from Disney's Great Animators. Routledge. ISBN 978-1-1350-1586-2.
- Deja, Andreas (2022). Walt Disney's The Jungle Book: Making a Masterpiece. Weldon Owen. ISBN 978-1-6818-8893-4.
- Finch, Christopher (2004) [1973]. The Art of Walt Disney: From Mickey Mouse to the Magic Kingdoms (Revised and Expanded ed.). New York: Harry N. Abrams. ISBN 0-8109-4964-4.
- Finch, Christopher (2000). Disney's Winnie the Pooh: A Celebration of the Silly Old Bear. New York: Disney Editions. ISBN 978-0-786-86352-5.
- Finch, Christopher; Rosenkrantz, Linda (2019) [1972]. "Woolie Reitherman". In Ghez, Didier (ed.). Walt's People: Volume 23—Talking Disney with the Artists Who Knew Him. Theme Park Press. pp. 47–52. ISBN 978-1-683-90242-3.
- Gabler, Neal (2006). Walt Disney: The Triumph of the American Imagination. Vintage Books. ISBN 978-0-6797-5747-4.
- Ghez, Didier (2019). They Drew as They Pleased Vol. 5: The Hidden Art of Disney's Early Renaissance. Chronicle Books. pp. 23–54. ISBN 978-1-797-20410-9.
- Holliss, Richard (February 1982). "Wolfgang Reitherman". Starburst. No. 42. pp. 16–19 – via Internet Archive.
- Koenig, David (1997). Mouse Under Glass: Secrets of Disney Animation & Theme Parks. Irvine, California: Bonaventure Press. ISBN 978-0-964-06051-7.
- Peri, Don; Docter, Pete (2024). Directing at Disney: The Original Directors of Walt's Animated Films. New York: Disney Editions. ISBN 978-1-484-75574-7.
- Sibley, Brian (Winter 1985). "Wolfgang Reitherman remembered". Animator. No. 14. pp. 10–11. Archived from the original on May 19, 2024.
- Solomon, Charles (1995). The Disney That Never Was. New York: Disney Editions. ISBN 978-0-786-86037-1.
- Thomas, Bob (1958). Walt Disney, the Art of Animation. Simon & Schuster.
- Thomas, Bob (1991). Disney's Art of Animation: From Mickey Mouse to Beauty and the Beast. New York: Hyperion. ISBN 1-56282-899-1.
- Thomas, Frank; Johnston, Ollie (1981). Disney Animation: The Illusion of Life. Abbeville Press. ISBN 0-89659-233-2.
