= Reitherman =

Reitherman is a surname. Notable people with the surname include:

- Bruce Reitherman (born 1955), American filmmaker and child actor
- Wolfgang Reitherman (1909–1985), German–American animator
