= Ralph Wright =

American writer and animator (1908–1983)

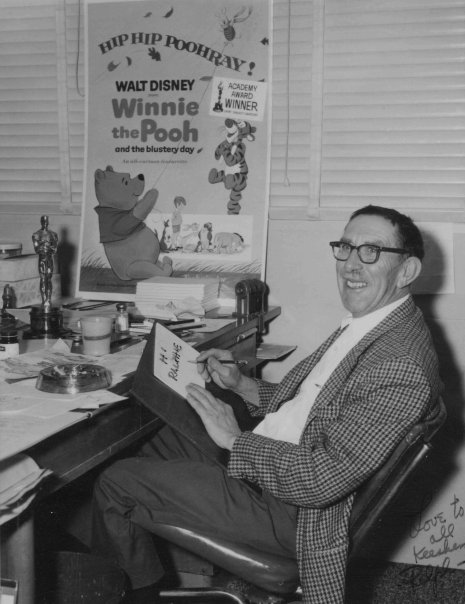
- Ralph Wright posing in front of the Oscar awarded for Winnie the Pooh and the Blustery Day which was awarded the 1968 Academy Award for Animated Short Film
- Born: May 17, 1908; Grants Pass, Oregon, U.S.
- Died: December 31, 1983 (aged 75); Los Osos, California, U.S.
- Occupations: Writer, actor, director, animation pioneer
- Years active: 1931–1983
- Employer(s): Walt Disney Productions (1940-1983); Gaumont British Animation (1948-1950)
- Spouse: Irmgard Julia Wright (m. 1956)

Ralph Waldo Wright (May 17, 1908 – December 31, 1983) was an American animator and story/storyboard writer who provided the gloomy, sullen voice of Eeyore from the popular Winnie the Pooh franchise.

== Biography ==
Wright came to the studio in the 1940s, and became well known throughout the ensuing decades for his endearingly gloomy and sullen personality traits as well as his bass voice. Shortly after World War II, Wright came to England to serve as an animation supervisor for Animaland in David Hand's Gaumont-British Animation studio in Cookham. He returned to the United States shortly after the studio's closure in 1950. In his later years, he turned out to be a natural model for Eeyore when the studio began development on Winnie the Pooh and the Honey Tree. Wright, along with his fellow Disney contemporaries, was a pioneer in the use of "gags" within cartoons, often acted out in front of the "story board," a bulletin board pinned with sequential sketches of the cartoon's scenes. Early on, with Goofy's Glider and other "How To" cartoons, Ralph pioneered the story concept featuring a hero's failed attempt at achieving his goals. This technique is still in use today in most major animation studios, with Warner Bros. Cartoons incorporated this premise into Wile E. Coyote and the Road Runner, Sylvester and Tweety, and Bugs Bunny and Daffy Duck cartoons. This highly reusable format proved to be wildly successful. In fact, full credit was attributed by Frank Tashlin interviewed by Michael Barrier in 2004: "That all came from a marvelous fellow who came from Tillamook, Oregon, a fellow by the name of Ralph Wright. He came down, and his pants were twelve inches too short for him, and he wore suspenders—he was out of the hills. But he had a crazy, crazy mind, almost as wild as Roy Williams, who is the best of all. Ralph did the first story of that type for Jack Kinney, called How to Ride a Horse. The Goof tried to stay on the horse—boom, off, another joke. That was the beginning of what still seems to be going on today. Then he and Kinney made more—a series of jokes, just one problem and working it out. It's like a symphony, with a theme and then the development of that theme."

He spent the last 30 years of his life in San Luis Obispo County in Los Osos, California, before his death on December 31, 1983, at his home in Los Osos from a heart attack, at the age of 75.

== Filmography ==
=== Writer/Storyboard Team ===
- Pipe Dreams (1938) (story)
- Goofy's Glider (1940) (story)
- The Art of Skiing (1941) (story)
- The Art of Self Defense (1941) (story)
- Donald's Garden (1942) (story)
- Bambi (1942) (story developer)
- Saludos Amigos (1942) (story)
- How to Swim (1942) (story)
- Victory Vehicles (1943) (writer)
- The Three Caballeros (1944) (story)
- The Eyes Have It (1945) (story)
- Donald's Crime (1945) (story)
- No Sail (1945) (story)
- Song of the South (1946) (cartoon story)
- Crazy with the Heat (1947) (story)
- The House Cat (Felis Vulgaris) (1948) (story supervisor) (Gaumont British Animation)
- The Cuckoo (1948) (story supervisor) (Gaumont British Animation)
- The Australian Platypus (1949) (story supervisor) (Gaumont British Animation)
- Dude Duck (1951) (story)
- Plutopia (1951) (story)
- R'coon Dawg (1951) (story)
- Lambert the Sheepish Lion (1952) (story)
- Trick or Treat (1952) (story)
- Peter Pan (1953) (story)
- Don's Fountain of Youth (1953) (story)
- The Wonderful World of Disney (1956–1964, six episodes) (story, writer)
- Siam (1954)
- Lady and the Tramp (1955) (story)
- Perri (1957) (writer)
- Sleeping Beauty (1959) (additional story)
- Popeye the Sailor (1960, five episodes) (story) (Jack Kinney Productions, King Features Syndicate)
- Mr. Magoo (1960, five episodes) (story) (UPA)
- The Dick Tracy Show (1961, nine episodes) (story) (UPA)
- Nikki, Wild Dog of the North (1961) (writer)
- Aquamania (1961) (story)
- Gay Purr-ee (1962) (additional dialog) (UPA, Warner Bros.)
- Snuffy Smith and Barney Google (1963, one episode) (writer) (Format Films, King Features Syndicate)
- Salmon Loafer (1963) (story) (Walter Lantz Productions)
- Yellowstone Cubs (1963) (writer)
- Winnie the Pooh and the Honey Tree (1966) (story)
- The Jungle Book (1967) (story)
- Winnie the Pooh and the Blustery Day (1968) (story)
- The Aristocats (1970) (story)
- Bedknobs and Broomsticks (1971) (animation story)
- Rogue's Rock (1974-1976 TV series) (ITV)
- The Many Adventures of Winnie the Pooh (1977) (story)

=== Actor ===
- Winnie the Pooh and the Honey Tree (1966) .... Eeyore (voice)
- Winnie the Pooh and the Blustery Day (1968) .... Eeyore (voice)
- The Many Adventures of Winnie the Pooh (1977) .... Eeyore (voice) (archive footage)
- Winnie the Pooh and a Day for Eeyore (1983) .... Eeyore (voice) (final film role)

=== Director ===
- Siam (1954)
- The Blue Men of Morocco (1956)
- Perri (1957)

=== Miscellaneous crew ===
- The Art of Self Defense (1941) (animator)
- Perri (1957) (composer: songs)
- Winnie the Pooh and the Honey Tree (1966) (performer: "Mind Over Matter")
- Winnie the Pooh and the Blustery Day (1968) (performer: "Hip Hip Pooh-ray!")

Preceded by none	Voice of Eeyore; 1966–1983	Succeeded by Ron Gans
