= Andy Gaskill =

American animator

- Born: Andrew Alan Gaskill; Camden, New Jersey, U.S.
- Occupations: Animator, art director, storyboard artist
- Years active: 1974–present

Andrew Alan Gaskill is an American animator, art director, and storyboard artist at Walt Disney Animation Studios. His work with the animation studio includes Winnie the Pooh and Tigger Too, The Rescuers, The Fox and the Hound, The Little Mermaid, and The Lion King.

Gaskill was chosen as art director for The Lion King after Disney executives saw storyboards that he created for one of the film's songs.

== Biography ==
Gaskill was born in Camden, New Jersey to an American soldier in the Pacific who was stationed in Tokyo, Japan, after the war, where he met and married a Japanese woman. Gaskill graduated in 1969 from Camden Catholic High School.
