= Sebastian Cabot (actor) =

English actor (1918–1977)

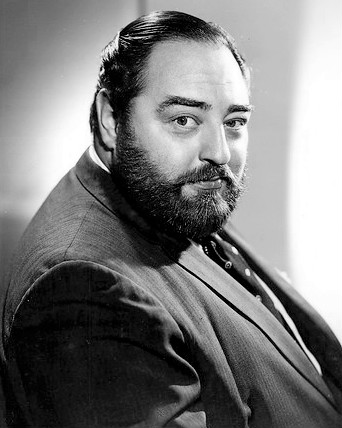
- Cabot in 1964
- Born: Charles Sebastian Thomas Cabot; 6 July 1918; London, England
- Died: 23 August 1977 (aged 59); Victoria, British Columbia, Canada
- Occupation: Actor
- Years active: 1935–1977
- Known for: Family Affair; The Time Machine; Kismet; Checkmate
- Spouse: Kathleen Rose Humphreys (m. 1940)
- Children: 3

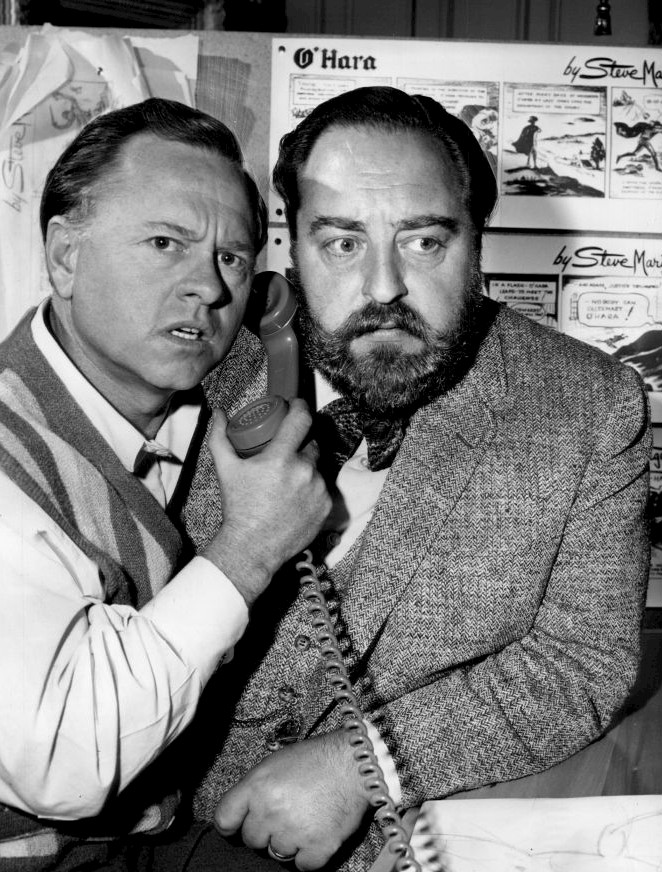
With Mickey Rooney in Checkmate (1961)

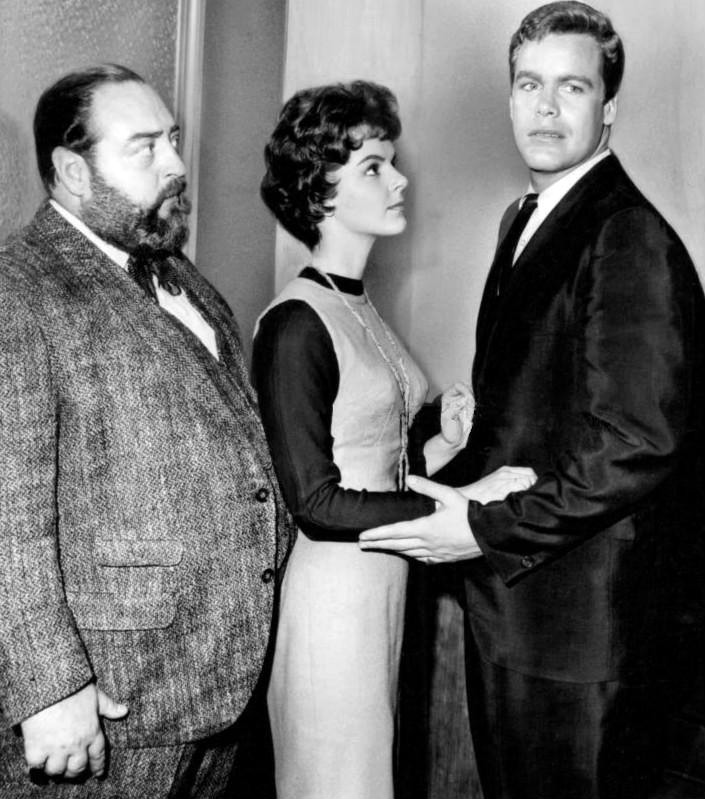
Cabot, Carolyn Craig, and Doug McClure in Checkmate (1962)

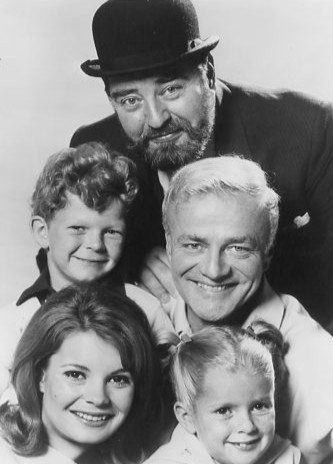
Cabot (at top) as Mr. French on Family Affair in 1967

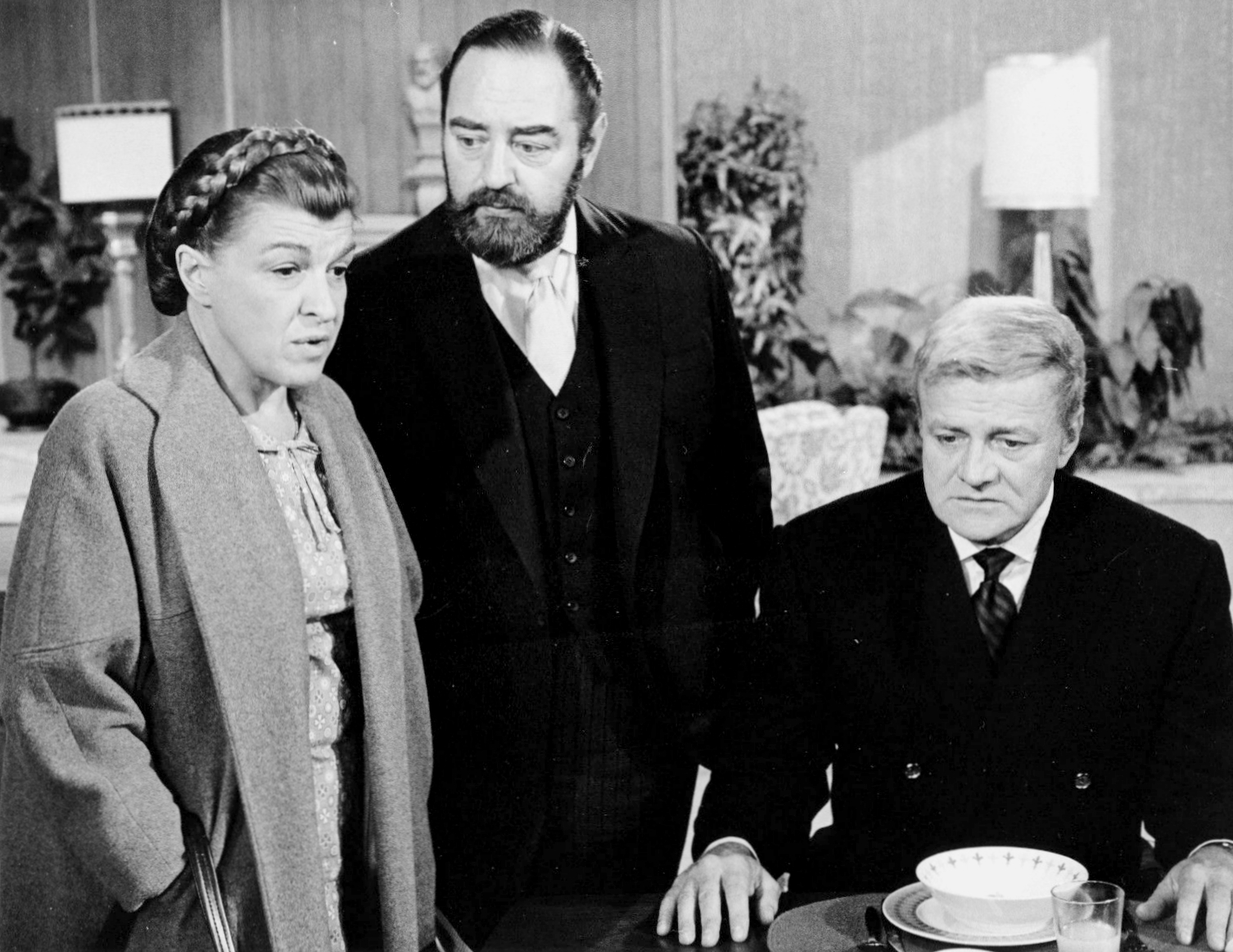
Nancy Walker, Cabot and Brian Keith in Family Affair, 1970

Charles Sebastian Thomas Cabot (6 July 1918 – 23 August 1977) was a British actor. He is best remembered as the gentleman's gentleman Giles French in the CBS-TV sitcom Family Affair (1966–1971). He was also known for playing the Wazir in the film Kismet (1955) and Dr. Carl Hyatt in the CBS-TV series Checkmate (1960–1962).

Cabot was also a voice performer in several Disney animated films. He made one of his first contributions in The Sword in the Stone (1963), as both the narrator and Lord Ector. He later played Bagheera in The Jungle Book (1967). His longest-standing role came through the Winnie the Pooh series, in which he narrated Winnie the Pooh and the Honey Tree (1966), Winnie the Pooh and the Blustery Day (1968), Winnie the Pooh and Tigger Too (1974), and The Many Adventures of Winnie the Pooh (1977).

== Early life ==
Charles Sebastian Thomas Cabot was born on 6 July 1918 in Marylebone, London. At the age of 14, he left school to work in an automotive garage, where he served as chauffeur and valet for English actor Frank Pettingell.

Cabot became interested in theatre, and after becoming acquainted with other actors and having worked for Pettingell, he joined a repertory company. Cabot admitted that in gaining employment as an actor he lied about previous acting credits. Cabot stated later in a 1968 interview that he believed acting was a type of lying, and he had gained a smoothness in his speech while serving as Pettingell's dressing room butler. He initially used an agency to find acting employment. Without attending any drama school, Cabot learned the hard way, having been fired on his first day in a show called On The Spot. However, finding more work, Cabot's confidence in his acting skills increased, and he was soon receiving personal calls for employment.

== Career ==
His formal acting career began with a bit part in Foreign Affaires (1935); his first screen credit was in Alfred Hitchcock's Secret Agent (1936). Other British films followed such as Love on the Dole (1941), Pimpernel Smith (also 1941), Old Mother Riley Overseas and Old Mother Riley Detective (both 1943) and They Made Me a Fugitive (1947). In 1946, he portrayed Iago in a condensed short film version of Othello. Post-war, Cabot landed roles in such British films as Third Time Lucky (1949), The Spider and the Fly (1949), as the villainous Fouracada in Dick Barton Strikes Back (1949); he was also in Ivanhoe (1952) and The Love Lottery (1954). He appeared in a couple of international productions, the Spanish-UK-USA Sinbad comedy Babes in Bagdad (1952) and the Italian version of Romeo and Juliet (1954) as Lord Capulet, before moving to the United States, where he worked for Disney on Westward Ho, the Wagons! (1956) and as the scheming landlord Jonathan Lyte in Johnny Tremain (1957). In George Pal's production of H. G. Wells' The Time Machine (1960) he was Dr. Hillyer who doubts the time traveller's story. Meanwhile, Cabot had begun to work as a voice actor. In the 1950s he was featured in a radio show called Horizons West, a 13-part radio drama which followed the story of the Lewis and Clark Expedition, and was the voice of Noah in the first recording of Igor Stravinsky's biblical 'musical play' The Flood (1962). He also did voice parts for animated films such as Disney's The Sword in the Stone (1963) as Sir Ector and in The Jungle Book (1967) as Bagheera.

About this time Cabot began taking on television work. He was the host of the syndicated Jack the Ripper series, and he portrayed the Count of Brisemont on The Three Musketeers and Andrew Crippen on The Beachcomber.

He also appeared in such series as Gunsmoke (as the title character "Professor Jacoby", an obnoxious, ruthless, unsympathetic photographer in the like-named S2E28's "The Photographer"), plus in Alfred Hitchcock Presents, The Adventures of Hiram Holliday (1956–57), on the detective series Meet McGraw (1958), in the western series Bonanza ("The Spanish Grant", 1960) and Pony Express ("The Story of Julesburg", 1960), The Red Skelton Show (various roles 1961–1971), and as an affable demon in The Twilight Zone episode "A Nice Place to Visit" (1960). Cabot had a two-year period as one of the three leads as college professor Dr. Carl Hyatt on the detective show Checkmate (1960–1962). As Checkmate fit into the CBS Saturday schedule, Cabot appeared as Eric Whitaker in the 1960 episode "Five O'Clock Friday" on the ABC adventure series, The Islanders. Cabot was a regular panellist on the television game show Stump the Stars. He appeared on the NBC interview programme Here's Hollywood. In 1964, he hosted the television series Suspense and voiced or narrated a few other film and television projects. In 1965, Cabot played a role on The Beverly Hillbillies as Lucas Sebastian, a billionaire entrepreneur who wanted Jed Clampett to invest in his new venture of undersea farming.

He was cast from 1966 to 1971 as Giles French in the CBS series Family Affair. In 1968, he received a Primetime Emmy Award nomination for Outstanding Continued Performance by an Actor in a Leading Role in a Comedy Series for his performance. Notwithstanding, Cabot did not halt his other film and television work during the run of Family Affair, but he took a leave of absence from the series at one point. Cabot was also the host of Journey to Midnight, as well as other work from the period. He was so vividly etched as French in viewers' minds that he never shook the image even after Family Affair ended production in 1971.

Cabot received another role as the host (Winston Essex) of Ghost Story (1972), a supernatural anthology (it was retitled Circle of Fear after he left the show). Following the series' demise, he played Kris Kringle in the television remake of Miracle on 34th Street (1973). The role required Cabot to shave the trademark beard he sported since 1957 as makeup crews were unable to make it look Santa-like. Cabot appeared in another Christmas project, the television film The City That Forgot About Christmas (1974), and narrated two more Pooh projects, Winnie the Pooh and Tigger, Too! and The Many Adventures of Winnie the Pooh. He also released an album of spoken recitations of songs by Bob Dylan, as Sebastian Cabot, actor/Bob Dylan, poet, in 1967. Two tracks from this album appear on the Rhino Records compilation Golden Throats: The Great Celebrity Sing Off.

On Broadway, Cabot portrayed Buckram in Love for Love (1947).

== Death ==
On 23 August 1977, Cabot suffered a stroke at his vacation home in Deep Cove, British Columbia, and was taken to a Victoria, British Columbia hospital, where he died at the age of 59. He was cremated, and his ashes were interred in Westwood Village Memorial Park Cemetery in Los Angeles, California.

== Legacy ==
On an episode of the Late Show with David Letterman, on 12 December 2012, comedian Billy Crystal mentioned Cabot in humorous dialogue with the host David Letterman. Letterman commented that Cabot's name had not been heard in 30 years. Directly before the commercial break Sebastian Cabot's photo was shown on national television as a tribute.

== Selected filmography ==
- Foreign Affaires (1935) in a bit role (uncredited)
- Love on the Dole (1941) as Man in Crowd at Betting Payout (uncredited)
- "Pimpernel" Smith (1941) in a bit role (uncredited)
- Jeannie (1941) in a bit role (uncredited)
- Old Mother Riley Detective (1943) in a bit role (uncredited)
- Old Mother Riley Overseas (1943) as Bar Steward
- The Agitator (1945) in a bit role (uncredited)
- Tehran (1946)
- Dual Alibi (1947) as Loterie Nationale Official
- They Made Me a Fugitive (1947) as Club Proprietor
- Third Time Lucky (1949) as Benny Bennett
- Dick Barton Strikes Back (1949) as Fouracada
- Old Mother Riley's New Venture (1949) as Potentate
- The Spider and the Fly (1949) as Prefect at Amiens
- The Adventures of Jane (1949) as Travelling Man
- Midnight Episode (1950) as Benno
- The Wonder Kid (1951) as Pizzo
- Laughter in Paradise (1951) as Card Player (uncredited)
- Old Mother Riley's Jungle Treasure (1951) as Morgan the Pirate
- Ivanhoe (1952) as Clerk of Copmanhurst
- Babes in Bagdad (1952) as Sinbad
- Alf's Baby (1953) as Osmonde
- The Captain's Paradise (1953) as Ali (Vendor)
- Always a Bride (1953) as Taxi Driver
- The Love Lottery (1954) as Suarez
- Romeo and Juliet (1954) as Capulet
- Knights of the Queen (1954) as Porthos
- Kismet (1955) as Wazir
- Sandman (1955, TV movie) as Count, Conrad Nagel Theater
- Alfred Hitchcock Presents (1956) (Season 1 Episode 14: "A Bullet for Baldwin") as Nathaniel Baldwin / Davidson
- Westward Ho the Wagons! (1956) as Bissonette
- Dragoon Wells Massacre (1957) as Jonah
- Johnny Tremain (1957) as Jonathan Lyte
- Omar Khayyam (1957) as The Nizam
- Black Patch (1957) as Frenchy De'vere
- Terror in a Texas Town (1958) as Ed McNeil
- In Love and War (1958) as Professor D. Everett Styles (scenes deleted)
- The Angry Hills (1959) as Chesney
- Say One for Me (1959) as Monsignor Francis Stratford
- Seven Thieves (1960) as Director of Casino
- The Twilight Zone (1960) (Season 1 Episode 28: "A Nice Place to Visit") as Pip
- The Time Machine (1960) as Dr. Philip Hillyer
- Twice-Told Tales (1963) as Dr. Carl Heidigger
- The Sword in the Stone (1963) as Sir Ector / Narrator (voice)
- The Family Jewels (1965) as Dr. Matson
- The Jungle Book (1967) as Bagheera / Narrator (voice)
- One Day on Beetle Rock (1967, TV movie) as the Narrator
- The Spy Killer (1969, TV movie) as Max
- Foreign Exchange (1970, TV movie) as Max
- McCloud (1971, TV movie) as Sidney Cantrell
- Miracle on 34th Street (1973, TV movie) as Kris Kringle
- The Many Adventures of Winnie the Pooh (1977) as The Narrator (voice) (final film role)
