= Conrad Nagel Theater =

American TV anthology series

Conrad Nagel Theater is a 30-minute American anthology series originally airing in first-run syndication from January 26, 1955 - July 14, 1955. Re-runs aired in syndication from 1956–1958. Conrad Nagel was the host. A total of 25 episodes were adapted from classical literature, including the stories of William Shakespeare, Geofrey Chaucer, Leo Tolstoy, Guy de Maupassant, Prosper Mérimée, and Alexander Pushkin.

The program was a production of Guild films. Its initial episode, "The Storm", starred Peter Trent, Betty Metcalf, and John Douglas. Another episode featured Sebastian Cabot in The Sandman.
