= Babes in Bagdad =

1952 American film by Edgar George Ulmer, Jerónimo Mihura Santos

- Directed by: Edgar G. Ulmer
- Written by: Felix E. Feist
- Produced by: Edward J. Danziger; Harry Lee Danziger
- Starring: Paulette Goddard; Gypsy Rose Lee
- Distributed by: United Artists
- Release date: November 30, 1952 (Shreveport, Louisiana)
- Running time: 79 minutes
- Country: United States
- Language: English

Babes in Bagdad is a 1952 American comedy film directed by Edgar G. Ulmer and starring Paulette Goddard and Gypsy Rose Lee.

== Plot ==
Arabian princess Kyra begins a strike, demanding equal rights for women, to the frustration of caliph Hassan. Supported by the Hassan's godson Ezar, Kyra enables Hassan to see the error of his polygamous ways. Hassan eventually selects his favorite wife, Zohara.

== Cast ==
- Paulette Goddard as Kyra
- Gypsy Rose Lee as Zohara
- Richard Ney as Ezar
- John Boles as Hassan
- Thomas Gallagher as Sharkhan
- Sebastian Cabot as Sinbad
- MacDonald Parke as Caliph
- Christopher Lee as Slave Dealer
- Carmen Sevilla as Mohra

== Production ==
Argentinian actor and singer Dick Haymes was announced as the film's star in June 1951. By November, the role had been assigned to Robert Sterling and then finally to John Boles, who had not appeared in a feature film since Thousands Cheer in 1943.

Filming began in Barcelona, Spain in December 1951.

Paulette Goddard's contract awarded her a percentage of the film's profits in addition to her salary.

The Motion Picture Association of America repeatedly warned the producers that the film would be denied approval under the Motion Picture Production Code if Gypsy Rose Lee, famous as a stripper, removed any clothing during the film.

== Release ==
The film premiered in Shreveport, Louisiana on November 30, 1952.

== Reception ==
In a contemporary review for The New York Times, critic A. H. Weiler wrote: "Although 'Babes in Bagdad' boasts a seraglio of beauties headed by those Hollywood houris, Paulette Goddard and Gypsy Rose Lee, this is definitely one harem to avoid. Filmed in Spain a couple of years back in a Spanish color process apparently calculated to induce the megrims even in the myopic, this pallid potpourri is purported to be a satire on the love life of the polygamous nobles of old Baghdad. The dialogue, supplied by no less than four writers, as well as the action, directed by Edgar G. Ulmer is, at best, a strain on the ears, eyes and intelligence."

In the New York Daily News, critic Seraphina Alaimo wrote: "The dialogue, even when compared to previous mediocre efforts dealing with oriental adventure tales, evil caliphs, exotic mischief and briefly costumed dancing girls, is embarrassing. The lines are read in an amateurish manner and the actors are incredibly miscast."
