= The Many Adventures of Winnie the Pooh =

1977 American animated anthology film produced by Walt Disney Productions

- Original theatrical release poster
- Directed by: Wolfgang Reitherman; John Lounsbery
- Story by: Larry Clemmons; Vance Gerry; Ken Anderson; Ted Berman; Ralph Wright; Xavier Atencio; Julius Svendsen; Eric Cleworth
- Based on: Winnie-the-Pooh by A. A. Milne; E. H. Shepard
- Produced by: Walt Disney; Wolfgang Reitherman
- Starring: Sterling Holloway; John Fiedler; Junius Matthews; Paul Winchell; Ralph Wright; Howard Morris; Bruce Reitherman; Jon Walmsley; Timothy Turner
- Edited by: Tom Acosta; James Melton
- Music by: Buddy Baker
- Production company: Walt Disney Productions
- Distributed by: Buena Vista Pictures Distribution
- Release date: March 11, 1977
- Running time: 74 minutes
- Country: United States
- Language: English

The Many Adventures of Winnie the Pooh is a 1977 American animated musical fantasy film produced by Walt Disney Productions, based on characters appearing in the Winnie-the-Pooh stories by A. A. Milne and E. H. Shepard. Directed by Wolfgang Reitherman and John Lounsbery, it is a compilation consisting of three Winnie the Pooh short films: Winnie the Pooh and the Honey Tree (1966), Winnie the Pooh and the Blustery Day (1968), and Winnie the Pooh and Tigger Too (1974). It was first released on a double bill with The Littlest Horse Thieves on March 11, 1977.

Its characters have spawned a franchise of various sequels and television programs, clothing, books, toys, and an attraction at Disneyland, Walt Disney World, and Hong Kong Disneyland in addition to Pooh's Hunny Hunt in Tokyo Disneyland.

== Plot ==
The film presents three previously released Winnie-the-Pooh animated featurettes, with extra bridging material of Pooh interacting with the Narrator to introduce the three stories.

A short scene was added to bring the film to a close; originally made during the production of Blustery Day (based on the presence of Jon Walmsley as Christopher Robin), and based on the final chapter of The House at Pooh Corner, Christopher Robin must leave behind the Hundred Acre Wood to start school. The Narrator concludes that wherever Christopher Robin goes, Pooh will always be waiting.

== Later featurette ==
Six years after the release of The Many Adventures of Winnie the Pooh, Disney commissioned a fourth featurette based on the stories. Winnie the Pooh and a Day for Eeyore premiered in theaters on March 11, 1983, but was not originally connected to the preceding films in any manner. It has since been added to home video releases of The Many Adventures of Winnie the Pooh.

== Voice cast ==
- Sebastian Cabot as Narrator
- Sterling Holloway as Winnie the Pooh
- John Fiedler as Piglet
- Paul Winchell as Tigger
- Bruce Reitherman (THT), Jon Walmsley (TBD) and Timothy Turner (ATT and epilogue) as Christopher Robin
- Ralph Wright as Eeyore
- Clint Howard (THT and TBD) and Dori Whitaker (ATT) as Roo
- Barbara Luddy as Kanga
- Junius Matthews as Rabbit
- Hal Smith as Owl
- Howard Morris as Gopher

== Production ==
The Many Adventures of Winnie the Pooh was the last film in the Disney canon in which Walt Disney had personal involvement, since one of the shorts (Winnie the Pooh and the Honey Tree) was released during his lifetime and he was involved in the production of Blustery Day. It was always Walt Disney's intention to create a feature film, but he decided to make shorter featurettes instead — after production had begun — to familiarize U.S. audiences with the characters. All three shorts, as well as future feature films, boast classic songs by the Sherman Brothers including "Winnie the Pooh" and "The Wonderful Thing About Tiggers".

The character Gopher, which does not appear in the Milne stories, was created because Disney wanted an all-American character that could appeal to the children, and also add an element of comedy.

For the character Piglet, hand gestures and other movements were used by the animators to create expressiveness, since he (and Pooh) had the appearance of dolls or stuffed animals with relatively simple button eyes. The scene where Rabbit deals with Pooh's rump being part of the "decor of his home" was not in the original book, but was reportedly contemplated by Disney when he first read the book.

== Release ==
=== Reception ===
The Many Adventures of Winnie the Pooh holds a unanimous critic approval rating of 100% on Rotten Tomatoes based on 18 reviews, with an average of 8.6/10. The website's critical consensus reads: "Perhaps the most faithful of Disney's literary adaptations, this cute, charming collection of episodes captures the spirit of A.A. Milne's classic stories." Film critic Leonard Maltin called the original Pooh featurettes "gems"; he also noted that the artwork resembles the book illustrations and that the particular length of these featurettes meant that the filmmakers did not have to "compress or protract their script."

The film is recognized by American Film Institute in these lists:

- 2008: AFI's 10 Top 10:
  - Nominated Animation Film

=== Home media ===
The Many Adventures of Winnie the Pooh was first released on VHS, Betamax, CED videorecord, and laserdisc on August 15, 1981, thus Disney’s first, then most recently-produced animated feature film to be released on home video at the time . In 1996, it was re-released on VHS as part of the Walt Disney Masterpiece Collection series and included video footage of the making which was shown before the movie starts (as did the first UK VHS release in 1997). It was released on DVD for the first time on May 7, 2002 as a THX certified 25th Anniversary Edition, with digitally restored picture and sound. The individual shorts had also been released on their own on VHS in the 1990s.

The 25th-anniversary edition DVD includes, among other bonus features: "The Many Adventures of Winnie the Pooh: The Story Behind the Masterpiece", which documents the history of the books and their initial film adaptations; the short Winnie the Pooh and a Day for Eeyore (1983); and interviews with animators Ollie Johnston, Frank Thomas, and Burny Mattinson, as well as the Sherman Brothers, Paul Winchell, and others. Digital Media FX reviewer Shannon Muir stated that the audio and video quality of the film on this DVD was very high.

The "Friendship Edition" DVD was released on June 19, 2007. All of the special features from the previous "25th Anniversary Edition" DVD were recycled, with the only new addition being an episode of Playhouse Disney's computer-animated series My Friends Tigger & Pooh. The DVD re-release coincides with the 30th anniversary of the release of the film.

The Blu-ray version was released for the first time along with the third DVD release on August 27, 2013. The bonus features included a Mini Adventures of Winnie the Pooh segment, "Geniuses" and the only bonus feature that was kept from the previous DVD releases was the "Winnie the Pooh" theme song music video performed by Carly Simon.

== Music ==
The Many Adventures of Winnie the Pooh

Soundtrack album Vinyl LP by The Sherman Brothers
- Released: 1977
- Label: Disneyland
- Producer: The Sherman Brothers

All tracks are written by The Sherman Brothers.

No.	Title	Performer(s)	Length
1.	"Winnie the Pooh"	Disney Studio Chorus
2.	"Up, Down, Touch the Ground"	Sterling Holloway
3.	"Rumbly in My Tumbly"	Sterling Holloway
4.	"Little Black Rain Cloud"	Sterling Holloway & Bruce Reitherman
5.	"Mind Over Matter"	Disney Studio Chorus
6.	"A Rather Blustery Day"	Sterling Holloway
7.	"The Wonderful Thing About Tiggers"	Paul Winchell
8.	"Heffalumps and Woozles"	The Mellomen
9.	"The Rain, Rain, Rain, Came Down, Down, Down"	Disney Studio Chorus
10.	"Hip Hip Pooh-Ray!"	Disney Studio Chorus
11.	"The Wonderful Thing About Tiggers (Reprise)"	Paul Winchell
