= The Art of Self Defense (1941 film) =

1941 animated film by Jack Kinney

- Directed by: Jack Kinney
- Produced by: Walt Disney
- Starring: Clarence Nash
- Music by: Leigh Harline
- Production company: Walt Disney Productions
- Distributed by: RKO Radio Pictures
- Release date: December 26, 1941
- Running time: 8 minutes
- Language: English

The Art of Self Defense is a cartoon made by the Walt Disney Company in 1941, featuring Goofy.

== Plot ==
After a brief history on the many different forms of manly arts through the years, from early men bashing each other with their primitive weapons (and kicks), to Egyptians poking at their opponents' eyes, to the Medieval Era where knights in armor hammer each other with maces, to the romantic age where chivalrous gentlemen are slapping each other with the glove, and then to early fisticuff brawling (with the lack of proper science when men are fighting as long as 75 to 80 rounds), Goofy demonstrates the different methods of boxing.

The narrator shows the audience, with Goofy as the model, learn about proper breathing exercises, skipping rope for conditioning, as well as punching the bag to measure coordination, agility, and developing the skill of "covering up", and shadow boxing literally against his shadow, normally used for perfecting form and timing.

The shadow makes his appearance as the narrator explain about good sportsmanship when both fighters give a friendly handshake before they pit their skills. The shadow gave Goofy a real vice-grip of a handshake.

Then the narrator explains the use of common blows (or punches), such as the right cross, the left cross, and the "double cross".

With the motion of the slow-motion camera, Goofy is trying to deliver the uppercut against the shadow, much like a ballet dancer, but the opponent countered the blow and sends the Goof flying across the hall. Then the camera "rewinds" the scene, and resumes at normal speed, until the "frame" stops to where Goofy was almost hit by a real uppercut as the narrator explains how the course of the blow as the entire weight of the body is brought into play with terrific force and the action resumes. It's also important of not forgetting to duck (lower oneself against the blow).

The shadow demonstrates more of the miscellaneous punches such as the left-hand jab, bolo, rabbit, solar plexus, backhand, and the roundhouse punch.

Of course, there are rules involving fouls when the shadow hits Goofy below the belt, something that every fighter in boxing should never do, because it is very unsportsmanlike, unethical, unnecessary, and uncomfortable. Goofy tries to protect himself by raising his pants and the beltline, but with little success as his opponent manages to find his way around the situation.

Finally Goofy feels ready for the boxing ring as he faces off a different boxer as he charges at the opponent, but the foe, sporting a Navy anchor tattoo, knocks Goofy's lights out with a left haymaker.

Time ever marches on in the art of self-defense.

== Voice cast ==
- Goofy: Clarence Nash
- Narrator: John McLeish

== Production ==
The cartoon was one of the first to feature many replicas of Goofy at one time. The end of the short uses the Tarzan yell on the soundtrack.

== Home media ==
The short was rereleased in the 2001 PlayStation game Goofy's Fun House, and on December 2, 2002, on Walt Disney Treasures: The Complete Goofy.
