= The Truth About Mother Goose =

1957 short film

- Directed by: Wolfgang Reitherman; Bill Justice
- Written by: Bill Peet
- Produced by: Walt Disney
- Narrated by: John Dehner
- Music by: George Bruns
- Production company: Walt Disney Productions
- Distributed by: Buena Vista Film Distribution
- Release date: August 28, 1957
- Running time: 14–15 minutes
- Country: United States
- Language: English

The Truth About Mother Goose is an animated short film released on August 28, 1957, by Walt Disney Productions. The short was directed by Wolfgang Reitherman in his directorial debut, and Bill Justice, and written by Bill Peet.

== Plot ==
In this short, a trio of jazz-singing jesters sing three Mother Goose nursery rhymes, while an off screen narrator explains their origins in three animated vignettes. The rhymes include:

- "Little Jack Horner": Thomas Horner (steward to Richard Whiting, the last abbot of Glastonbury), allegedly stealing a title deed in transit to Henry VIII of England.
- "Mary, Mary, Quite Contrary": The life of Mary Stuart. The segment claims that the "silver bells" are said to "refer to the elaborate decoration on her dresses", the "cockle shells" to her love of exotic food such as cockles, with the "pretty maids all in a row" referring to her ladies-in-waiting.
- "London Bridge Is Falling Down": The gradual deterioration and dilapidation of the medieval Old London Bridge.

== Academy Awards ==
The short was nominated for the Academy Award for Best Animated Short Film in 1957, but lost to the Merrie Melodies cartoon Birds Anonymous, starring Tweety and Sylvester.

== Home media ==
The short was released on December 6, 2005, on Walt Disney Treasures: Disney Rarities – Celebrated Shorts: 1920s–1960s.
