= Ted Berman =

American cartoonist

- Born: December 17, 1919; East Los Angeles, California, U.S.
- Died: July 15, 2001 (aged 81); Los Angeles, California, U.S.
- Resting place: Hillside Memorial Park Cemetery
- Occupations: Film director, animator, screenwriter
- Years active: 1940s–1980s
- Spouse: Jacqueline Berman

Ted Berman (December 17, 1919 – July 15, 2001) was an American film director, animator, and screenwriter, known for his work with Disney, including Fantasia, Bambi and The Black Cauldron.

== Early life ==
Berman was born in East Los Angeles, California. He studied at the Chouinard Art Institute after growing up wanting to become an artist.

== Career ==
Joining Disney in the 1940s, Berman started off as an animator, but focused on writing and directing in his later years. Berman was also a fine-arts painter. He served on the Disney staff for 45 years. Berman worked on a number of successful theatrical releases by the Mouse House along with his work with The Wonderful World of Color and The Mickey Mouse Club. In the 1980s, he helped direct The Fox and the Hound and The Black Cauldron before he retired from Disney.

== Filmography ==
=== Writing ===
- Bedknobs and Broomsticks (1971) (Animation Story)
- Winnie the Pooh and Tigger Too (1974) (Story)
- The Many Adventures of Winnie the Pooh (1977) (Story)
- The Rescuers (1977) (Story)
- The Fox and the Hound (1981) (Story)
- The Black Cauldron (1985) (Story)

=== Director ===
- The Fox and the Hound (1981)
- The Black Cauldron (1985)

=== Animation ===
- Fun and Fancy Free (1947) (Character Animator)
- Sleeping Beauty (1959) (Character Animator)
- 101 Dalmatians (1961) (Character Animator)

=== Works ===
- Fantasia (1940)
- Bambi (1942)
- The Boy And The Wolf (1943)
- Flirty Birdy (1945)
- The Invisible Mouse (1947)
- Dr. Jekyll and Mr. Mouse (1947)
- Alice in Wonderland (1951)
- Peter Pan (1953)
- Lady and the Tramp (1955)
- Mary Poppins (1964)
- The Rescuers (1977)
- The Fox and the Hound (1981)
- The Black Cauldron (1985)

== Death ==
Berman died at 81 on July 15, 2001, at his home in Los Angeles from heart failure in his sleep, survived by his wife Jacqueline, children, and grandchildren.
