= Goliath II =

1960 film by Wolfgang Reitherman

- Title card
- Directed by: Wolfgang Reitherman
- Story by: Bill Peet
- Produced by: Walt Disney
- Starring: Kevin Corcoran; Barbara Jo Allen; Paul Frees
- Narrated by: Sterling Holloway
- Music by: George Bruns
- Animation by: John Lounsbery (directing) (character); Eric Cleworth; Blaine Gibson; Bill Keil; Hal King; Dick N. Lucas; Cliff Nordberg; Amby Paliwoda; John Sibley
- Layouts by: Collin Campbell; Basil Davidovich; Vance Gerry
- Backgrounds by: Gordon Legg; Richard H. Thomas; Thelma Witmer
- Color process: Ralph Hulett (color stylist); Technicolor
- Production company: Walt Disney Productions
- Distributed by: Buena Vista Distribution
- Release date: January 21, 1960 (with Toby Tyler)
- Running time: 15 minutes
- Country: United States
- Language: English

Goliath II is a 1960 American animated comedy short film produced by Walt Disney Productions. Directed by Wolfgang Reitherman and written by Bill Peet, it is narrated by Sterling Holloway and stars the voices of Kevin Corcoran, Barbara Jo Allen and Paul Frees. It was released theatrically in the United States on January 21, 1960, alongside the live-action film Toby Tyler (also starring Corcoran).

The short was the first Disney short cartoon to make full use of xerography, a process of using Xerox technology to transfer animation drawings to cels as part of the traditional animation process instead of utilizing hand-inking. Goliath II received an Academy Award nomination for Best Animated Short, losing to Gene Deitch's Munro. Elements of this short were later reused in The Jungle Book (1967).

== Plot ==
Goliath II is a miniature 8-year-old Indian elephant (about 7.5 to 10 centimeters (3 to 4 in) tall. However, the consistency of this is variable) who tries to impress his father, the biggest elephant of them all. His father doesn't care about him because of his size, although his mother does. A tiger named Raja is curious to taste an elephant and tries to attack Goliath, but is stopped by Goliath's mother. Afterward, Eloise (another herd member) almost accidentally steps on Goliath. Later, he is nearly eaten by a crocodile, but his mother again saves him.

As the elephants are marching through the jungle, Goliath leaves the line to follow two snails and gets lost. His mother and Raja search for Goliath and find him in a snail hole. After a short tug of war between Goliath's mother and Raja, Goliath is rescued. Goliath's mother scolds him for defying her warnings to not wander off and puts him into a bird's nest as a timeout. Goliath is fed up with being treated like a baby and feels confident that he can take care of himself.

That night, while the herd is sleeping, Goliath runs away from the herd and vows never to return. Afterward, he is frightened by various jungle noises and accidentally wakes up Raja, who seizes him. Goliath cries for his mother, who rescues him and sends Raja into the crocodile's mouth; he escapes and is never seen again. Goliath deserting the herd is considered a serious offense and, to make it worse, he has disgraced his father.

The next day, while the elephants are marching through the jungle again, Goliath's father is frightened by a mouse. The mouse panics the herd, causing them to flee and hide in the river (except for Goliath's mother who hangs from a branch). The mouse laughs at the elephants but finds Goliath watching him unafraid. Shocked and enraged, the mouse says that Goliath should be afraid because elephants are afraid of mice and starts a fight with him, which ends with Goliath holding the mouse over a cliff above the same hungry crocodile. The mouse begs for his life, and Goliath spares him. After this, Goliath is finally respected by his father and is named the top elephant of the herd.

== Cast ==
- Kevin Corcoran as Goliath II, a tiny elephant who wishes to prove that he can be as good as his father, though all his efforts and curiosities get him into trouble. At first considered a "disgrace" after leaving the herd, he is branded a hero after saving the other elephants from a mouse.
- Barbara Jo Allen as Goliath II's Mother, who is proud of Goliath II's efforts but upset at the mischief he causes.
- Paul Frees as Goliath I, Goliath II's father. Due to Goliath II's size, he doesn't like his son at all.
  - Frees also voiced the Mouse, an arrogant, nasty and bullying rodent who enjoys scaring elephants and bullies Goliath II but is defeated by him in battle.
- Sterling Holloway as the Narrator

== Home media ==
The short was released on December 6, 2005, on the Walt Disney Treasures: Disney Rarities - Celebrated Shorts: 1920s–1960s DVD collection. The short was also included on volume one of the Walt Disney's It's a Small World of Fun! DVD collection released on May 16, 2006.

== See also ==
- List of American films of 1960
