= Winnie the Pooh and the Honey Tree =

1966 animated film by Wolfgang Reitherman

- One of theatrical release posters. Piglet and Tigger, neither of whom appear in the film, here more closely resemble their appearance in the E. H. Shepard illustrations.
- Directed by: Wolfgang Reitherman
- Story by: Larry Clemmons; Ralph Wright; Xavier Atencio; Ken Anderson; Vance Gerry; Dick Lucas
- Based on: Stories written by A. A. Milne and illustrated by E. H. Shepard
- Produced by: Walt Disney
- Starring: Sterling Holloway; Junius Matthews; Bruce Reitherman; Hal Smith; Howard Morris; Ralph Wright; Ginny Tyler; Dal McKennon
- Narrated by: Sebastian Cabot
- Music by: Buddy Baker
- Production company: Walt Disney Productions
- Distributed by: Buena Vista Distribution
- Release dates: February 4, 1966 (U.S. with The Ugly Dachshund); March 20, 1966 (UK with The Ugly Dachstund); March 11, 1977 (The Many Adventures of Winnie the Pooh)
- Running time: 26 minutes
- Country: United States
- Language: English

Winnie the Pooh and the Honey Tree is a 1966 American animated musical fantasy short film based on the first two chapters of the 1926 book Winnie-the-Pooh by A. A. Milne, while the troubles in reattaching Eeyore's tail come from chapter 4 of the same book and Pooh's exercises in front of the mirror come from the poem #38 (Teddy Bear, first appearance of the character) in When We Were Very Young. The film was produced by Walt Disney Productions, and released by Buena Vista Distribution on February 4, 1966, as a double feature with The Ugly Dachshund. It was the last short film produced by Walt Disney, who later died on December 15, 1966, ten months after its release. Its songs were written by the Sherman Brothers (Richard M. Sherman and Robert B. Sherman) and the score was composed and conducted by Buddy Baker.

Directed by Wolfgang Reitherman, it was the first animated featurette in the Winnie the Pooh film series, and it was later added as a segment to the 1977 film The Many Adventures of Winnie the Pooh.

It featured the voices of Sterling Holloway as Winnie the Pooh, Junius Matthews as Rabbit, Bruce Reitherman as Christopher Robin, Clint Howard as Roo, Barbara Luddy as Kanga, Ralph Wright as Eeyore, Howard Morris as Gopher, and Hal Smith as Owl. It was narrated by Sebastian Cabot.

== Plot ==
One morning, Winnie the Pooh, a honey-loving anthropomorphic bear who lives in the Hundred Acre Wood, does his stoutness exercise to help improve his appetite. Pooh then looks in his cupboard to look for honey, only to find that his last honey pot is empty. He then hears a bee fly by and decides to climb a nearby honey tree, but he is unsuccessful. Unwilling to give up his quest for honey, Pooh visits the house of his best friend, a 7-year-old human boy named Christopher Robin, where he obtains a balloon from him. He then rolls around in a mud puddle, hoping to trick the bees into believing he is a "little black rain cloud" and uses the balloon to float up to the hive. The bees see through this disguise and angrily chase Pooh and Christopher Robin away.

Still hungry for honey, Pooh decides to visit his friend Rabbit's house, where Rabbit reluctantly invites him to have some honey. After Pooh greedily helps himself to all of the honey in Rabbit's house, he begins to leave, only to realize that he has gotten too chubby to fit through the passageway that Rabbit uses as his front door. Unable to push Pooh's bottom through by himself, Rabbit rushes off to get help. Meanwhile, Owl tries to convince a gopher to dig Pooh out of the hole from the front, which is unsuccessful. Rabbit returns with Christopher Robin and they both try to pull Pooh out but fail; Christopher Robin decides Pooh must wait without food until he is thin enough to pass through Rabbit's front door, much to the consternation of both Pooh and Rabbit.

To cope with the situation, Rabbit attempts to decorate Pooh's bottom, while making sure that Pooh doesn't eat any food. After several days, Rabbit, who has become increasingly tired of the situation, leans against Pooh's bottom and feels him move slightly; he then joyously summons Christopher Robin and the rest of his friends to free Pooh. Rabbit pushes Pooh from inside, while everyone else pulls Pooh from outside, without success. Fed up with the delay, Rabbit takes several steps backwards and shoves Pooh with a running start, causing the bear to be launched into the air. He lands headfirst into the hole of another honey tree, scaring the bees away. Although his friends offer to free him again, Pooh does not mind being stuck again, as he can now eat all the honey he likes.

== Voice cast ==
- Sterling Holloway as Winnie-the-Pooh, an anthropomorphic teddy bear who loves honey.
- Bruce Reitherman as Christopher Robin, a 7-year-old boy and Pooh's best friend.
- Ralph Wright as Eeyore, an old donkey who is always losing his tail and talks in a slow, deep, depressed voice.
- Junius Matthews as Rabbit, a rabbit who loves planting his vegetables in his garden.
- Barbara Luddy as Kanga, a kangaroo and Roo's mother.
- Clint Howard as Roo, Kanga's energetic young joey.
- Howard Morris as Gopher, a hardworking gopher who lives underground and often falls into his hole.
- Hal Smith as Owl, an elderly owl who loves to tell stories about his family.
- Dallas McKennon and Ginny Tyler as the Bees (uncredited)
- Sebastian Cabot as Mr. Narrator

== Production ==
Walt Disney first learned of the Winnie-the-Pooh books from his daughter, Diane. "Dad would hear me laughing alone in my room and come in to see what I was laughing at," Diane later recalled. "It was usually the gentle, whimsical humor of A. A. Milne's Pooh stories. I read them over and over, and then many years later to my children, and now to my grandchildren." As early as 1938, Disney expressed interest in obtaining the film rights, and began negotiating with the Curtis Brown literary agency. In June 1961, Disney acquired the film rights. By 1964, Disney told his animation staff that he was planning to make a full-length animated feature film based on the books. A meeting was held with senior staff members to discuss the proposed film. However, during the meeting, Disney decided not to make a feature film, but instead, a featurette that could be attached to a live-action film.

For the first featurette, Disney and his collaborators turned to the first two chapters of the first book, "In which we are introduced to Winnie-the-Pooh and some honey Bees, and the stories Begin", and "In which Pooh Goes Visiting and Gets into a Tight Place". The scene where Rabbit deals with Pooh's being part of the "decor of his home", was not from the original book, and was reportedly contemplated by Disney when he first read the book. Following the mixed reception of Alice in Wonderland (1951), he turned the project over to staff members who were nonchalant with the original stories. He selected Wolfgang Reitherman to direct the project in hopes he would Americanize the characters and include more humor. Reitherman cast his son, Bruce, to voice Christopher Robin. The character of Gopher, who does not appear in the original stories, was added to the cast. Because other "Nine Old Men" animators were working on The Jungle Book (1967) (whom Bruce would also star in), only Eric Larson and John Lounsbery were assigned to animate the characters. Other character animators such as Hal King, John Sibley, and Eric Cleworth were brought onto the project.

== Soundtrack ==
- Writers: Robert and Richard Sherman. Produced by: Salvador Camarata. Recorded from 1964 to 1965.

=== Musical numbers ===
- "Winnie the Pooh" - Off-Stage Voices
- "Up, Down, Touch the Ground" - Pooh
- "Rumbly in My Tumbly" - Pooh
- "Little Black Rain Cloud" - Pooh and Christopher Robin
- "Mind Over Matter (Heave Ho)" - Company

Another musical number titled "Kanga's Lullaby" (sung by B. J. Baker) was added as extra material for the soundtrack.

== Release ==
The film finished production in late 1965 and was released on February 4, 1966. The film held its world premiere in seven different theaters in three states. Five of the theaters held their world premieres in five different cities in Florida: Tampa, St. Petersburg, Clearwater, Gainesville, and Daytona Beach; and the two other theaters held their premieres at the State-Lake Theatre in Chicago, Illinois and the Fox Theatre in Atlanta, Georgia. It was later released throughout the United States days later, as a supplement to Disney's live-action feature The Ugly Dachshund.

The film was released in the United Kingdom almost two months later, also as a supplement to The Ugly Dachshund according to Britain's The Guardian, and held its British premiere (along with its supplement) at the Prince Charles Cinema located at the West End of London on March 20, 1966. It was later included as a segment in The Many Adventures of Winnie the Pooh, which included the two further Pooh featurettes, released on March 11, 1977.

During the fall of 1966, Winnie the Pooh and the Honey Tree was re-issued for the second time in America, as a supplement to Disney's live-action feature The Fighting Prince of Donegal. Since the film became so popular in America, Winnie the Pooh and the Honey Tree was reused twice in local city theaters during 1967 as an extra feature to Lt. Robin Crusoe, U.S.N. in Spokane, Washington and The Adventures of Bullwhip Griffin in Philadelphia.

The film had its network premiere on March 10, 1970, as a television special on NBC. The film became a popular annual repeat for most of the decade until its last showing on November 25, 1977. That same year, NBC had also acquired the broadcasting rights to Winnie the Pooh and the Blustery Day, which premiered on November 30. Approximately five years later, Winnie the Pooh and Tigger Too also held its television premiere on NBC on November 28, 1975. Additionally, all three specials were sponsored by Sears, who was then the exclusive provider of Pooh merchandise.

On March 16, 1986, the featurette was shown for the first time on ABC as part of The Disney Sunday Movie. The network was not intending to air the featurette that night, with the film Robin Hood originally scheduled; a Presidential Address by Ronald Reagan (in connection of violence in Nicaragua and the mounting danger in Central America) was scheduled for that evening as well and was to be carried across the nation beginning at 8:00 PM Eastern. The move resulted in ABC cutting the second half of the program to accommodate President Reagan's speech, leaving only one hour for The Disney Sunday Movie. The network decided instead to air Winnie the Pooh and the Honey Tree, then filled out the hour with three classic cartoons featuring Chip 'n' Dale and Donald Duck: Chips Ahoy, Up a Tree, and Chicken in the Rough.

Winnie the Pooh and the Honey Tree was re-released in England multiple times throughout the 1970s and 1980s. The film was reissued in July 1976 as a supplement to the film Escape from the Dark, and in October 1985, the film was reissued again as a supplement to Peter Pan (1953). Winnie the Pooh and the Honey Tree later held its British television premiere on ITV on June 14, 1986.

=== Cancelled theatrical re-release ===
On December 5, 2011, Don Hall, who directed the 2011 Winnie the Pooh feature film, revealed that Disney originally planned to release a remastered version of Winnie the Pooh and the Honey Tree featuring scenes deleted from the original version. However, the idea was discarded in favor of a new film due to lack of enough deleted footage to "make it worthwhile".

== Reception ==
The short initially received a mixed reception. Howard Thompson of The New York Times said that "[t]he Disney technicians responsible for this beguiling miniature have had the wisdom to dip right into the Milne pages, just the way Pooh paws after honey...The flavoring, with some nice tunes stirred in, is exactly right—wistful, sprightly, and often hilarious. Kenneth Tynan of The Observer felt "The sedate foolishness of Pooh is prettily captured, and there are very few offensive additions. Purists, however, will rightfully balk at such innovations as the stammering gopher and the songs, in one of which Pooh is made to sing: 'Speaking poundage-wise / I improve my appetite when I exercise.'" E. H. Shepard felt the replacement was "a complete travesty", and Felix Barker of The Evening News ran a campaign opposed to the change. A. A. Milne's widow, Daphne, is said to have liked it.

== Winnie the Pooh short films ==
- Winnie the Pooh and the Honey Tree
- Winnie the Pooh and the Blustery Day
- Winnie the Pooh and Tigger Too
- Winnie the Pooh and a Day for Eeyore

== See also ==
- List of American films of 1966

== Sources ==
- Finch, Christopher (2011) [2000]. Disney's Winnie the Pooh: A Celebration of the Silly Old Bear (Hardcover) (Updated ed.). Glendale, California: Disney Editions. pp. 33–35, 37–39, 49–50. ISBN 978-0-786-86352-5.
