= Winnie the Pooh and the Blustery Day =

1968 short film directed by Wolfgang Reitherman

- Theatrical release poster
- Directed by: Wolfgang Reitherman
- Story by: Winston Hibler; Larry Clemmons; Ralph Wright; Julius Svendsen; Vance Gerry
- Based on: Stories written by A. A. Milne
- Produced by: Walt Disney
- Starring: Sterling Holloway; John Fiedler; Paul Winchell; Hal Smith; Jon Walmsley; Ralph Wright
- Narrated by: Sebastian Cabot
- Music by: Buddy Baker
- Production company: Walt Disney Productions
- Distributed by: Buena Vista Distribution
- Release dates: December 20, 1968; (USA) (with The Horse in the Gray Flannel Suit); March 11, 1977 (The Many Adventures of Winnie the Pooh)
- Running time: 25 minutes
- Country: United States
- Language: English

Winnie the Pooh and the Blustery Day is a 1968 American animated musical fantasy short film based on the third, fifth, ninth, and tenth chapters of Winnie-the-Pooh and the second, eighth, and ninth chapters from The House at Pooh Corner by A. A. Milne. The featurette was directed by Wolfgang Reitherman, produced by Walt Disney Productions, and released by Buena Vista Distribution Company on December 20, 1968, having been shown in theaters with The Horse in the Gray Flannel Suit. This was the second of the studio's Winnie the Pooh theatrical featurettes. It was later added as a segment to the 1977 film The Many Adventures of Winnie the Pooh. The music was written by Richard M. Sherman and Robert B. Sherman. It was notable for being the last Disney animated short to be produced by Walt Disney, who died of lung cancer on December 15, 1966, two years before its release. It starred the voices of Sterling Holloway as Winnie the Pooh, Jon Walmsley as Christopher Robin (replaced Bruce Reitherman), Barbara Luddy as Kanga, Clint Howard as Roo, Paul Winchell as Tigger, Ralph Wright as Eeyore, Hal Smith as Owl, Howard Morris as Gopher, John Fiedler as Piglet, Junius Matthews as Rabbit, and Sebastian Cabot as the narrator.

Winnie the Pooh and the Blustery Day won the 1968 Academy Award for Best Animated Short Film. The Academy Award was awarded posthumously to Disney. This was also the only Winnie the Pooh production to ever win an Academy Award. (Winnie the Pooh and Tigger Too, which was released six years later in December 1974, was nominated for the same Academy Award, but lost to Closed Mondays.) The animated featurette also served as an inspiration for the Many Adventures of Winnie the Pooh ride in the Disney theme parks in which the rider experiences several scenes from the cartoon, including Pooh's Heffalump and Woozle dream. A modified version of the featurette's poster was used for The Many Adventures of Winnie the Pooh (1977).

== Sources ==
The film's plot is based primarily on seven A. A. Milne stories: "In which Eeyore finds the Wolery and Owl moves into it" (Chapter IX from The House at Pooh Corner) "In which Tigger comes to the forest and has breakfast" (Chapter II from The House at Pooh Corner), "In which Pooh & Piglet go hunting and nearly catch a Woozle" (Chapter III of Winnie the Pooh), "In which Piglet does a very grand thing" (Chapter VIII from The House at Pooh Corner), "In which Christopher Robin gives a Pooh Party and we say goodbye" (Chapter X of Winnie-the-Pooh) and "In which Piglet is entirely surrounded by water" (Chapter IX of Winnie-the-Pooh), with elements taken from "In which Piglet meets a Heffalump" (Chapter V from Winnie-the-Pooh: Winnie the Pooh's nightmare of Heffalumps and Woozles). In A. A. Milne's original story, Pooh shows more initiative during the flood, finding his way to Christopher Robin by riding on one of his floating honey pots, which he names The Floating Bear, then having the inspiration of using Christopher Robin's umbrella to carry them both to Piglet's house.

== Plot ==
On a very windy day, when Winnie the Pooh visits his "thoughtful spot", Gopher arrives and advises him to leave, claiming that it is a "Winds-day". Misunderstanding Gopher's warning, Pooh decides to wish everyone in the Hundred Acre Wood a happy Winds-day. He starts with his best friend Piglet, who is nearly blown away while trying to rake leaves. Pooh grabs Piglet by his scarf, which unravels and leaves Piglet hanging on like a kite. The wind blows Pooh and Piglet to Owl's treehouse, where he invites them in. During their stay, the strong wind causes Owl's tree to sway and eventually collapse, taking the house with it. Upon learning that Owl's house is wrecked beyond repair, Eeyore volunteers to seek out a new house for Owl.

That night, Pooh is visited by a bouncing tiger named Tigger, who states that he has come looking for something to eat. Disgusted by the taste of Pooh's honey, Tigger warns him about creatures called Heffalumps and Woozles that steal honey before he leaves. Frightened by Tigger's words, Pooh stays up to guard his honey but falls asleep as a thunderstorm brews. After having a nightmare about being attacked by Heffalumps and Woozles, Pooh wakes up in a flood caused by the storm.

In the flood, Piglet is washed away from his home on a floating chair, but not before he manages to write a message in a bottle for help. Meanwhile, Pooh manages to escape to higher ground with ten honey pots, only to also be washed away by the rising waters. The rest of the Hundred Acre Wood's populace gathers at Christopher Robin's house, the only place in the Wood that isn't flooded, except for Eeyore, who has refused to give up house hunting for Owl. The group soon discover Piglet's bottle, and Owl flies off to tell Piglet that help is on the way.

Owl eventually finds Piglet and Pooh together. While he attempts to ease Piglet's fears with a story, Piglet notices that they are approaching a waterfall. Pooh inadvertently switches places with Piglet as they take the plunge, and the waterfall washes them right into Christopher Robin's yard. Thinking that Pooh has rescued Piglet, Christopher Robin deems Pooh a hero. Once the flood subsides, Christopher Robin throws a party for Pooh, where Eeyore announces that he has found a new home for Owl, which, known to everyone except Owl and Eeyore, is actually Piglet's house. Rather than explain the misunderstanding, Piglet generously lets Owl have his home and accepts Pooh's invitation to live with him. At Pooh's request, Christopher Robin declares the occasion a "two hero party" in celebration of Pooh's heroism and Piglet's selflessness.

== Voice cast ==
- Sterling Holloway as Winnie the Pooh, an anthropomorphic bear who loves eating honey.
- Paul Winchell as Tigger, a tiger who loves to bounce on his tail.
- John Fiedler as Piglet, a small pig and Pooh's best friend who fears nearly everything.
- Ralph Wright as Eeyore, an old grey donkey who is always losing his tail and talks in a slow and deep depressing voice.
- Junius Matthews as Rabbit, a rabbit who is obsessive-compulsive and loves planting his vegetables in his garden.
- Barbara Luddy as Kanga, a kangaroo and Roo's mother.
- Clint Howard as Roo, Kanga's energetic young joey.
- Howard Morris as Gopher, a hardworking gopher who lives underground and often falls into his hole.
- Hal Smith as Owl, an owl who loves to talk about his family.
- Jon Walmsley as Christopher Robin, a 7-year-old boy and Pooh's human best friend.
- The Mellomen as the Singers
- Sebastian Cabot as Mr. Narrator

== Production ==
Shortly before Walt Disney's death on December 15, 1966, the animation department was finishing work on The Jungle Book and preparing for The Aristocats. In late summer 1967, before The Aristocats went into production, it was decided to go ahead with a featurette-length sequel to Winnie the Pooh and the Honey Tree. The short commenced production under the title Winnie the Pooh and the Heffalumps. Because The Honey Tree was popular with American audiences, it was decided Blustery Day would be the first animation project without Disney. Under the new circumstances, the "Nine Old Men" animators Frank Thomas, Ollie Johnston, and Milt Kahl were brought onto the project. Wolfgang Reitherman remained as director, but he decided to feel more faithful to the source material.

During a story meeting for the short, Disney felt that Wally Boag was perfect for the role of Tigger, who was added to the short. However, after Disney's death, Boag's performance of the character was considered to be "too zany" for this film, and instead, the role went to Paul Winchell. Following a British backlash to The Honey Tree led by film critic Felix Barker, Piglet was added to the short, having only appeared during the titular song sequence in the prior short. For the part, Disney had heard John Fiedler's voice on television and selected him to voice the character. Although Fiedler's natural speaking voice was higher than most men's, he still had to raise it considerably to achieve the character's high pitch.

== Release ==
In anticipation of the short's release, Los Angeles Mayor Sam Yorty proclaimed October 25, 1968 as "Winnie the Pooh Day". Starting from Disneyland, Pooh and several other characters made personal appearances in several Sears stores throughout 25 cities in the United States to help promote merchandise.

The film was released on December 20, 1968 in the United States, as a supplement to Disney's live-action comedy feature The Horse in the Gray Flannel Suit. It was later included as a segment in The Many Adventures of Winnie the Pooh, which included the two other Pooh featurettes, released on March 11, 1977.

Like Winnie the Pooh and the Honey Tree, Blustery Day also had its television premiere on November 30, 1970 as a special on the NBC television network. Like both specials, both Pooh specials ran throughout most of the 1970s and was sponsored by Sears, who was then the exclusive provider of Pooh merchandise. On March 5, 1989, the film was re-aired on NBC's Magical World of Disney.

=== Home media ===
The film was released on VHS and Betamax in 1986. It was re-released in 1989, 1991, 1993, 1994 and 1997, and on July 11, 2000 as part of the Storybook Classics Collection. This short also shows up as a bonus feature on the 2006 DVD release of Pooh's Grand Adventure: The Search for Christopher Robin.

It was also released on the Super 8mm film format by Derann in the early 2000s, making it one of the company's final and rarest films released, with only twelve copies made.

== Music ==
Winnie the Pooh and the Blustery Day

Soundtrack album by Various artists
- Released: 1968
- Recorded: 1967
- Studio: Sunset Sound
- Genre: Children's
- Length: 23 minutes
- Label: Disneyland Records
- Producer: Salvador Camarata

All songs were written by Robert and Richard Sherman, who wrote most of the music for the Winnie-the-Pooh franchise over the years, subsequently incorporated into the 1977 musical film, The Many Adventures of Winnie the Pooh which is an amalgamation of the three previous Winnie-the-Pooh featurettes.

In advance of the featurette's release, Disneyland Records released several LP albums accompanied with a read-along book. The first one was titled Walt Disney Presents Winnie the Pooh and the Blustery Day and released in 1967. Sterling Holloway served as both the narrator and the voice of Pooh on the album. Distinctively from the featurette, Sam Edwards sang as Tigger.

All tracks are written by Richard and Robert Sherman.

Side one
No.	Title	Performer(s)	Length
1.	"Winnie the Pooh"	Disney Studio Chorus
2.	"A Rather Blustery Day"	Sterling Holloway
3.	"The Wonderful Thing About Tiggers"	Sam Edwards
4.	"The Wonderful Thing About Tiggers (Reprise)"	Sam Edwards

Side two
No.	Title	Performer(s)	Length
5.	"Heffalumps and Woozles"	The Mellomen
6.	"The Rain, Rain, Rain, Came Down, Down, Down"	Disney Studio Chorus
7.	"Hip Hip Pooh-Ray!"	Disney Studio Chorus
8.	"Winnie the Pooh"	Disney Studio Chorus

== Voice cast (soundtrack) ==
- Sterling Holloway as Winnie the Pooh
- Sam Edwards as Tigger and Owl
- Robie Lester as Piglet and Roo
- Barbara Luddy as Kanga
- Thurl Ravenscroft as Eeyore
- Dallas McKennon as Rabbit and Gopher
- Jon Walmsley as Christopher Robin
- The Mellomen as the Singers

== Winnie the Pooh short films ==
- Winnie the Pooh and the Honey Tree (1966)
- Winnie the Pooh and the Blustery Day (1968)
- Winnie the Pooh and Tigger Too (1974)
- Winnie the Pooh and a Day for Eeyore (1983)

== See also ==
- List of American films of 1968

== Bibliography ==
- Finch, Christopher (2000). Disney's Winnie the Pooh: A Celebration of the Silly Old Bear. Disney Editions. ISBN 978-0786863525.
