= Aquamania =

1961 film

- Directed by: Wolfgang Reitherman
- Written by: Vance Gerry; Ralph Wright
- Produced by: Walt Disney
- Starring: Pinto Colvig; Kevin Corcoran; John Dehner
- Narrated by: John Dehner
- Music by: Buddy Baker
- Production company: Walt Disney Productions
- Distributed by: Buena Vista Distribution
- Release date: December 20, 1961
- Running time: 8 minutes
- Country: United States
- Language: English

Aquamania is an American animated short film produced by Walt Disney Productions and released by Buena Vista Distribution on December 20, 1961.

This cartoon was the last from Disney's "Golden Era" which featured Goofy as a solo star, and the first time the xerography animation-technique was used in a Goofy cartoon. Aquamania combined Goofy's three familiar areas in his career: sports, fatherhood, and documentary-subject.

== Plot ==
The story begins with a narrator explaining a case study of "aquamania" (obsession with boats and boating), with Goofy (called "Mr. X" in this short) as the subject. Then the story switches to Goofy and his son on a boating trip, inadvertently entering a water skiing race. In the process, Goofy meets up with an unfortunate octopus that joins him in the race, and they accidentally take an unwanted spin on a roller coaster at a waterside amusement park. Goofy eventually ends up winning the race.

== Voice cast ==
- Pinto Colvig as Goofy (Mr. X)
- Kevin Corcoran as Goofy Jr.
- John Dehner as Narrator/Race announcer

== Accolades ==
The short was nominated for an Academy Award for Best Animated Short Film in 1962.

== Home media ==
The short was released on December 2, 2002, on Walt Disney Treasures: The Complete Goofy. It was released to Disney+ on July 7, 2023.
