= Bruce Reitherman =

American actor and filmmaker (born 1955)

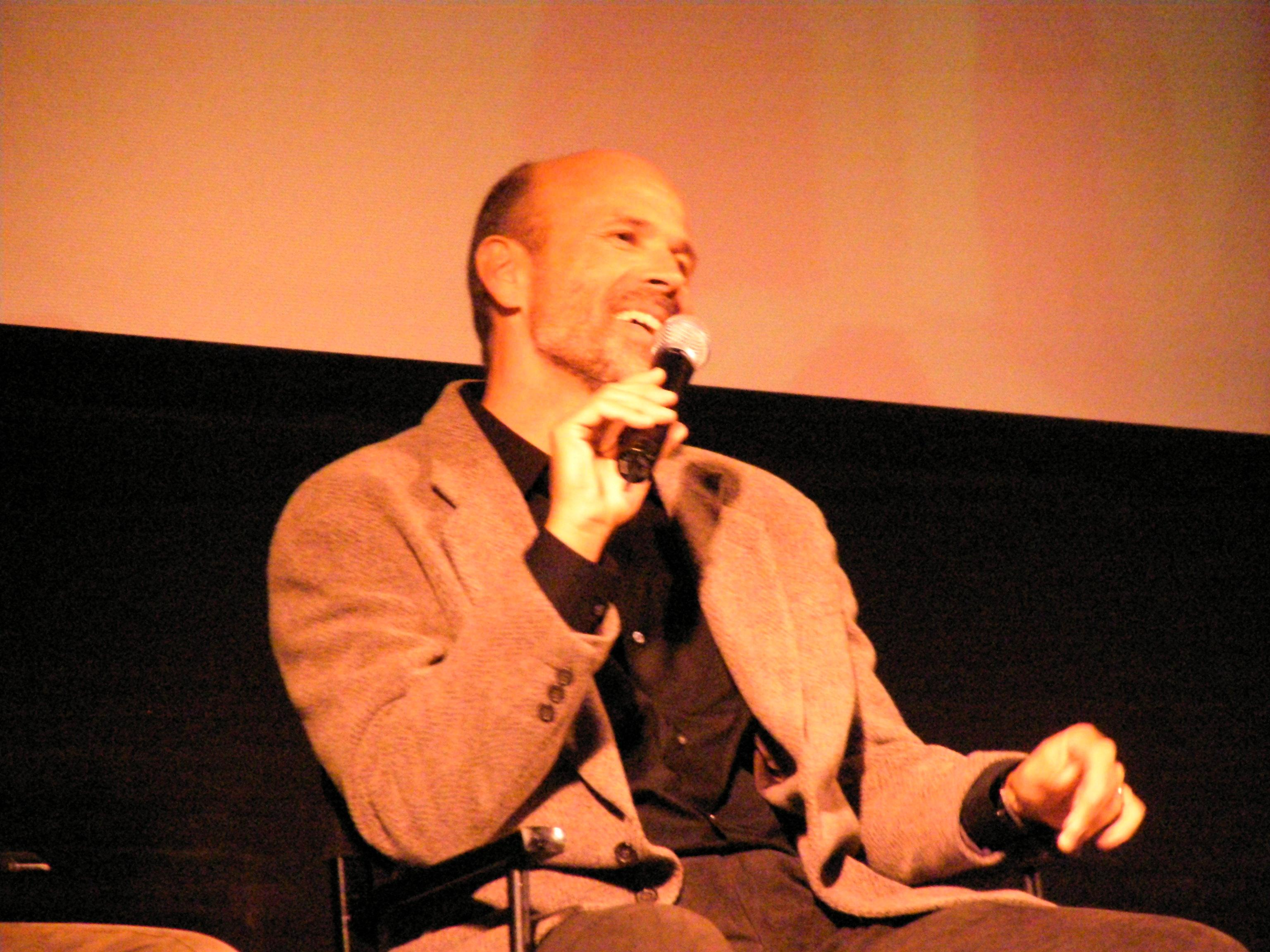
- Reitherman on stage during a presentation
- Born: September 15, 1955 (age 71); Burbank, California, U.S.
- Occupations: Cameraman, filmmaker, naturalist, actor (formerly)
- Years active: 1963–present
- Spouse: Erika Hill
- Children: 1
- Parent(s): Wolfgang Reitherman (father); Janie McMillan (mother)

Bruce Reitherman (born September 15, 1955) is an American cameraman, filmmaker, naturalist and former child actor. He voiced Christopher Robin in Winnie the Pooh and the Honey Tree and Mowgli in The Jungle Book.

== Early life and work ==
Born on September 15, 1955 in Burbank, California, Reitherman is the son of German-American Disney animator Wolfgang Reitherman, one of Disney's Nine Old Men, and Janie Marie McMillan, and provided the voices of Mowgli in The Jungle Book and Christopher Robin in Winnie the Pooh and the Honey Tree, both directed by his father.

He graduated from the University of California, Berkeley, in 1977 with an independent major in natural resources and a minor in Spanish.

== Career ==
After graduating from Berkeley, he had stints as a river guide, field biologist, naturalist, expedition leader and biological consultant. He has worked on natural history productions in exotic locations from Alaska to Australia. Starting out as a freelance cameraman in 1983, Reitherman has gone on to produce documentaries broadcast by PBS, National Geographic Television, The Discovery Channel, the BBC and Canal Plus. He served as cameraman, producer, writer and director, in the 1990s in shows like In the Wild, Nature, and Big Bear Week.

Reitherman was also part of a Members Only Preview for the behind-the-scenes exhibition titled Walt Disney’s The Jungle Book: Making a Masterpiece during a special talk alongside Andreas Deja, Darleen Carr and Floyd Norman which took place on June 22, 2022. The exhibition took place at The Walt Disney Family Museum from June 23, 2022 to January 8, 2023.

== Personal life ==
He lives in Santa Barbara, California with his wife, artist Erika Hill, and their daughter.

== Filmography ==
=== Film ===
- Winnie the Pooh and the Honey Tree (1966) (voice of Christopher Robin)
- The Jungle Book (1967) (voice of Mowgli the Man Cub)
- The Many Adventures of Winnie the Pooh (1977) (singing voice of Christopher Robin in the segment of Winnie the Pooh and the Honey Tree, spoken lines re-dubbed by Jon Walmsley)
- Big Bear Week (2006) (5 episodes)
- Out from Boneville (2004) (voice of Rat Creatures)

=== Director, writer, producer ===
- Nature (1982) TV series (episode "The Living Edens: Big Sur - California's Wild Coast")
- In the Wild (1995) TV series (episode " Whales with Christopher Reeve")
- The Living Edens (1997) TV series (episodes " Big Sur: California's Wild Coast (2002), Thailand: Jewel of the Orient (1999), Denali: Alaska's Great Wilderness (1997)")
- New True Life Adventures: Alaska: Dances of the Caribou (2000) TV movie
