= Winnie the Pooh and Tigger Too =

1974 film directed by John Lounsbery

Winnie The Pooh and Tigger Too
- Theatrical release poster
- Directed by: John Lounsbery
- Story by: Larry Clemmons; Ted Berman; Eric Cleworth; Don Bluth; Gary Goldman; John Pomeroy
- Based on: Stories written by A. A. Milne
- Produced by: Wolfgang Reitherman
- Starring: Sterling Holloway; Paul Winchell; John Fiedler; Junius Matthews; Dori Whitaker; Barbara Luddy; Timothy Turner
- Narrated by: Sebastian Cabot
- Music by: Buddy Baker
- Production company: Walt Disney Productions
- Distributed by: Buena Vista Distribution
- Release dates: October 21, 1974 (Limited); December 20, 1974 (U.S. with The Island at the Top of the World); December 27, 1974 (UK); March 11, 1977 (The Many Adventures of Winnie the Pooh)
- Running time: 25 minutes
- Country: United States
- Language: English

Winnie the Pooh and Tigger Too is a 1974 American animated musical fantasy short film based on the third chapter of Winnie-the-Pooh and the fourth and seventh chapters of The House at Pooh Corner by A. A. Milne. The featurette was directed by John Lounsbery, produced by Wolfgang Reitherman, released by Walt Disney Productions, and distributed by Buena Vista Distribution. This was the third animated featurette in the Winnie the Pooh film series. The film's title is a play on the slogan "Tippecanoe and Tyler too" made famous during the 1840 United States presidential election. It featured the voices of Sterling Holloway as Winnie the Pooh, Paul Winchell as Tigger, John Fiedler as Piglet, Timothy Turner as Christopher Robin, Dori Whitaker as Roo, Barbara Luddy (in her final film role) as Kanga, Junius Matthews (in his final film role) as Rabbit, and Sebastian Cabot as Mr. Narrator.

Winnie the Pooh and Tigger Too was released on October 21, 1974 for a limited release, before expanding a wide release on December 20, 1974, with the live-action feature film The Island at the Top of the World. It was nominated for an Academy Award for Best Animated Short Film but lost to Closed Mondays.

== Plot ==
Rabbit has become fed up with Tigger bouncing on everyone for fun, so he meets with Pooh and Piglet and comes up with a plan: the three of them will take Tigger on a long walk in the forest, abandon him, and find him the next day, in the hopes that his spirit will be broken and he will stop bouncing.

Pooh, Piglet, and Rabbit execute the plan the next morning, and while they manage to lose Tigger, things soon go wrong when the three are unable to find their way home. After Rabbit separates from Pooh and Piglet due to a disagreement on how to escape, the latter two manage to find their way out of the forest on their own before running into Tigger, who had already found his way out. Upon learning from Pooh and Piglet that Rabbit is still in the forest, Tigger returns to rescue Rabbit and lead him out of the forest, much to the latter's humiliation.

Sometime later, during the first snowfall of winter, Tigger and Roo spend the day together. As the two travel through the forest, they decide to bounce up to the top of a tall tree, which they succeed in doing, but upon reaching the top, Tigger becomes too frightened to come down. Pooh and Piglet soon discover Tigger and Roo in the tree and recruit Christopher Robin, Roo's mother, Kanga, and Rabbit to help get them down. Roo manages to make it down safely by jumping onto Christopher Robin's coat, but a still-frightened Tigger refuses to jump and promises never to bounce again should he be released from his predicament, thrilling Rabbit. To help Tigger, the Narrator tips over the book to allow Tigger to slide down unharmed.

Tigger's joy to be back on the ground turns into depression when Rabbit reminds him of his promise. Feeling bad for Tigger, his friends remind Rabbit of the joy Tigger had brought with his bouncing, causing Rabbit to realise his selfishness and take back the promise they had agreed on. An overjoyed Tigger then invites Rabbit to bounce with him, which, much to his own surprise, he greatly enjoys. Everyone joins in the bouncing, as Tigger sings his signature song for the last time.

== Voice cast ==
- Sterling Holloway as Winnie the Pooh
- Paul Winchell as Tigger
- John Fiedler as Piglet
- Junius Matthews as Rabbit (one of his last films before his death in 1978, also his final Disney role)
- Barbara Luddy as Kanga (one of her last films before her death in 1979, also her final Disney role)
- Dori Whitaker as Roo
- Timothy Turner as Christopher Robin
- Sebastian Cabot as Mr. Narrator

== Awards ==
In 1975, Winnie the Pooh and Tigger Too won the Grammy Award for Best Album for Children. It was also nominated for the Academy Award for Best Animated Short Film.

== Film release ==
The film was released limitedly on October 21, 1974 before getting a wide release on December 20, 1974 in the United States to Disney's live-action feature The Island at the Top of the World and December 27, 1974 in the United Kingdom. It would later be included as a segment in The Many Adventures of Winnie the Pooh, which included the two previous Pooh featurettes, released on March 11, 1977.

Like Winnie the Pooh and the Honey Tree, Winnie the Pooh and Tigger Too was also re-issued in theaters in North America. In the summer of 1978, Winnie the Pooh and Tigger Too was attached as a double-feature with The Cat from Outer Space.

Like both Winnie the Pooh and the Honey Tree and Winnie the Pooh and the Blustery Day, Winnie the Pooh and Tigger Too also had its network and world television premiere as a television special on NBC, on November 28, 1975. Along with the other 2 shorts, the premiere of Winnie the Pooh and Tigger Too was also sponsored by Sears, who was then the exclusive provider of Pooh merchandise.

== Winnie the Pooh short films ==
- Winnie the Pooh and the Honey Tree (1966)
- Winnie the Pooh and the Blustery Day (1968)
- Winnie the Pooh and Tigger Too (1974)
- Winnie the Pooh and a Day for Eeyore (1983)
