= Disneyana Fan Club =

- Founded: 1984; 42 years ago
- Headquarters: Worldwide
- Key people: Nicolasa Nevarez - President; Louis Boish - VP, Finance; Stephanie Fields - VP, Chapters; Laurie Smith - VP, Membership; Brian Hugo - Special Events Coordinator; Paul Schnebelen - Legends Chair; Linda Rolls - Charities Chair; Melissa Smith - Secretary; Teri Jo Countryman - VP, Media Relations and Communications; Eric Yokoyama - Editor-in-Chief, Newsletter; Theo Fukushima - Webmaster; Ted Bradpiece - Director at Large; Christine Demmitt - Director at Large; Jeannie Evans - Director at Large
- Website: disneyanafanclub.org

The Disneyana Fan Club or DFC was founded in 1984 as a non-profit organization dedicated to the preservation and dissemination of Walt Disney's legacy. Its published aim is to provide Disneyana enthusiasts worldwide with news, information, and events designed to enhance their "experience with, and love of, all things Disney." The club has twenty-five chapters in the United States, Canada, Japan and Australia. Disneyana has held an annual convention since the early 1990s which pre-dates collector events produced by the Disney company by over a decade.

== Charitable beneficiaries ==
Each year money is raised at various events, expos and auctions to benefit worthy causes.

=== West Coast ===
Proceeds from events and auctions on the west coast go to Ryman Arts in Los Angeles in order to train, educate and encourage teenagers in arts and artists. Ryman has been a beneficiary since 1989. Herb Ryman was the artist responsible for designing Sleeping Beauty Castle at Disneyland.

=== East Coast ===
On the east coast, proceeds raised benefit Give Kids The World which is located just outside Orlando, Florida. Give Kids the World is a specially designed theme park village for children (and their families) who suffer from life-threatening illnesses. Providing wish-granting (in coordination with over 250 organizations worldwide), the organization gives accommodations at its 70-acre resort and also provides meals for week long vacationers. Admission tickets to Orlando resorts and attractions are also donated.

=== Elsewhere ===
Throughout the rest of the United States Disneyana Fan Club Chapters will support their own local charities as well.

== Chapters Worldwide ==
There are currently 23 chapters of the DFC worldwide. Events and practices of each chapter vary depending on the needs of each chapter's members.

United States of America

Arizona

Grand Canyon Chapter

California

Chapter at the Park
Golden Gate Chapter
Neverland Chapter
Nor Cal Chapter
The Studio Chapter
Yosemite-Oakhurst-Sierra 49Ears Chapter
California Capital's Disneyana Fan Club
San Diego County Chapter

Florida

World Chapter

Illinois

Land of Mickey Chapter

Maryland

Baltimore Chapter

Minnesota

Star of the North Chapter

New Jersey

Jersey Shore

United States of America (cont'd)

New York

New York Area Chapter

Oregon

Cascade Chapter

Rhode Island

OceanEars Southern New England Chapter

Washington

MountainEars Chapter

Australia, New South Wales

Down Under Disneyana Club

Canada, British Columbia

SW-British Columbia Chapter

Japan

Tokyo Chapter

Virtual Chapter

Happiest Chapter in the Land

== DFC Disney Legend Awards ==
Each year recipients of this award are chosen for having made significant contributions to the Disney legacy. Honorees include animators, Imagineers, vocal talent, songwriters, actors, executives, a photographer and a research economist. Contributions made by Legends span over eighty years, from the time of the earliest silent films produced by Walt Disney in Kansas City, Missouri, to the most recent films and theme park attractions. Honorees include:

1993 Ollie Johnston
1993 Marc Davis
1993 Frank Thomas
1993 Bill Justice
1994 Bill Evans
1994 John Hench
1994 Richard M. Sherman
1994 Robert B. Sherman
1994 Blaine Gibson
1994 Betty Taylor
1994 Wathel Rogers
1994 Wally Boag
1995 Xavier Atencio
1995 Ward Kimball
1995 Marvin Davis
1995 Rolly Crump
1995 Bill Martin
1995 Marty Sklar
1996 Kathryn Beaumont
1996 Peter Ellenshaw
1996 Sam McKim
1996 Van France
1996 Fulton Burley
1996 Card Walker
1996 Buddy Baker
1997 Tommy Kirk
1997 Ron Dominguez
1997 Milt Albright
1997 Paul Winchell
1997 Jack Lindquist
1997 Harriet Burns
1997 Fred Joerger
1997 Cicely Rigdon
1997 Bob Gurr
1997 Charles Boyer
1997 Alice Davis
1998 Ilene Woods
1998 Harry Tytle
1998 Harrison "Buzz" Price
1998 George McGinnis
1998 Collin Campbell
1998 Bob Phelps
1998 Bob Moore

1998 Bob Broughton
1998 Peter Behn
1998 Ken O'Connor
1998 June Foray
1998 Joe Grant
1998 Irving Ludwig
1999 Norman "Stormy" Palmer
1999 Don Iwerks
1999 Jack Speirs
1999 Mary Costa
1999 Roy E. Disney
1999 Virginia Davis
1999 Don Edgren
1999 Charles Ridgway
2000 Volus Jones
2000 Ruthie Tompson
2000 Dodie Roberts
2000 Dick Jones
2001 Jim Cora
2001 Joyce Carlson
2001 Herbert Ryman
2001 Burny Mattinson
2001 Becky Fallberg
2002 The Walt Disney Family Foundation
2002 Dave Smith
2003 Mary Blair
2003 Russi Taylor
2003 Wayne Allwine
2004 Tony Baxter
2005 Andreas Deja
2005 Renie Bardeau
2005 Orlando Ferrante
2006 George Britton
2006 Dick Kline
2006 Ahmad Jafari
2006 Glenn W. Durflinger Jr.
2006 Walt Peregoy
2006 Tom Nabbe
2006 Ralph Kent
2007 Bob Matheison
2007 Bill "Sully" Sullivan
2007 Don Hahn
2007 Maggie Irvine Elliott and Jim Elliott

2007 Richard Irvine
2008 Hank Dains
2008 Greta Verity
2008 Phil Smith
2008 Mary Anne Mang
2008 Joe Rohde
2008 Joe Hale
2008 Jess Rubio
2008 Masatomo Takahashi
2008 Toshio Kagami
2009 Tony Anselmo
2009 Paige O'Hara
2009 David Mumford
2009 Bruce Gordon
2009 Bill Farmer
2009 Frank Armitage
2009 Eric Jacobson
2009 Jodi Benson
2010 Wayne Jackson
2010 Miriam Nelson
2010 Mark Henn
2010 Eddie Carroll
2011 Ron Miller
2011 Kevin Rafferty
2011 David Stollery
2011 Eric Goldberg
2011 Tim Considine
2011 Susan Egan
2012 Sherry Alberoni
2012 Tommy Cole
2012 Roger Broggie Jr.
2012 Ron Clements
2012 Roger Broggie
2012 Johnny Crawford
2012 John Musker
2012 Glen Keane
2012 Doreen Tracey
2013 Bruce Reitherman
2013 Don "Ducky" Williams
2013 Howard Green
2013 Wolfgang Reitherman
2014 Lonnie Burr

2014 Nancy Abbate
2014 Karen Pendleton
2014 Karen Dotrice
2014 Floyd Norman
2014 Cubby O'Brien
2014 Bobby Burgess
2015 Dick Nunis
2015 Joe Lanzisero
2015 Jim Henson
2016 Garner Holt
2018 Michael Peraza Jr.
2018 Patty Peraza
2020 Margaret Kerry
2022 Terri Hardin
2022 Oscar Martinez
2022 Karlos Siqueiros
2023 Willie Ito
2023 Jane Shattuck-Takamoto-Baer
2023 Kevin Kidney
2023 Jody Daily
2023 Leota Toombs
2023 Kim Irvine
2024 Rebecca Cline

== Disneyana! (Official Theme Song) and introductory video ==
("Disneyana!" The Official Theme Song of the Disneyana Fan Club)

Disneyana! Official Theme Song (Introduction by songwriter Robert J. Sherman. Performed by the Liberty Voices. Song arranged and produced by Jamey Ray. A barbershop quartet arrangement was also created by Ray and performed by the Dapper Dans at the live inauguration of the song during the club's annual convention in July 2015 which coincided with Disneyland's 60th Anniversary celebrations in Anaheim California.

== See also ==
- Disney pin trading
- Disney Vinylmation
- Disney Tsum Tsum
