= List of Disney Main Street window honors =

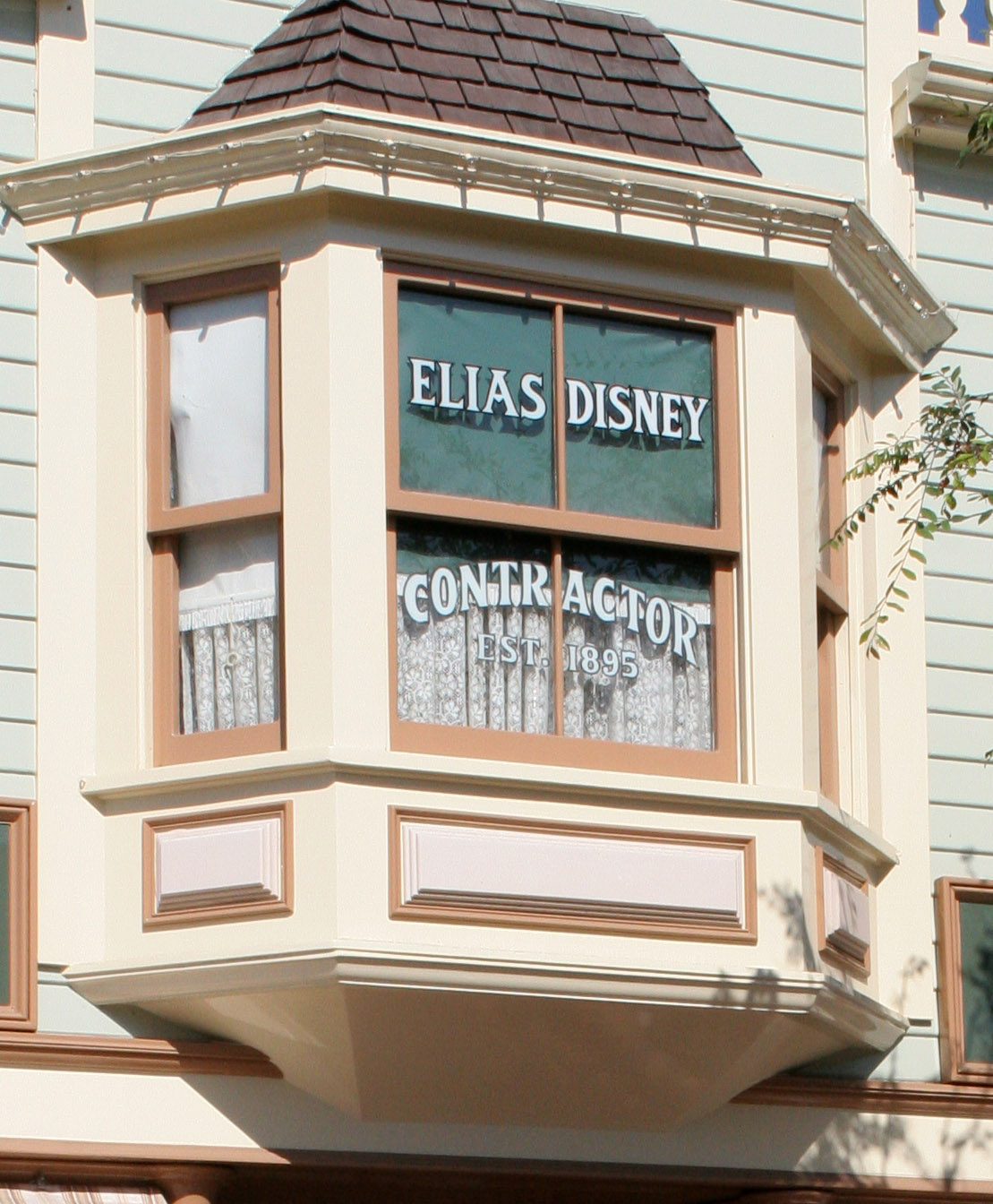
Elias Disney's window at Disneyland.

This is a list of windows on Main Street, U.S.A. at the Disney resorts. The names painted in the windows credit some of the parks' major contributors (except at Disneyland Paris, where some refer to characters or stories from Disney films and shows). They typically appear as fictional businesspeople, and often refer to the honoree's development or other interests. Bob Gurr's window, for example, refers to his design of most of the park's vehicles.

According to former Disney Imagineering head Marty Sklar, "to add a name [on a window] today, there are three requirements: Only on retirement; only [for] the highest level of service/respect/achievement; [only on] agreement between top individual park management and Walt Disney Imagineering, which creates the design and copy concepts [text]."

Windows are listed in alphabetical order by last name.

== A ==
Name	Inscription	Location	Park
Milt Albright	Milt Albright - Entrepreneur - No Job Too Big - No Job Too Small	Above the Opera House	Disneyland
Charles Alexander	Carpenters & Joiners - George Mills - Ray Conway - Chas Alexander	Above the Market House	Disneyland
Bob Allen	Windermere Fraternal Hall - “Lodge Meetings Every Friday” - Charter Members - Bob Allen, Pete Crimmings, Dick Evans, Bill Hoelscher, Bob Mathieson, Bill Sullivan	Center Street - Above Crystal Arts	Magic Kingdom
C.F. Allen	C. F. Allen, MD - C. V. Patterson, MD	Above New Century Timepieces	Disneyland
Hideo Amemiya	Happiest Dreams on Earth - International School of Hospitality - Hideo Amemiya, Headmaster - "We put people first"	Above the Disney Showcase	Disneyland
Ken Anderson	Ken Anderson - Bait Co.	Above the Market House	Disneyland
X Atencio	The Musical Quill - Lyrics and Librettos by X. Atencio	Above the Opera House	Disneyland
X Atencio	The Musical Quill - Lyrics and Librettos by X. Atencio	Above Confectionery	Magic Kingdom

== B ==
Name	Inscription	Location	Park
Buddy Baker	Plaza School of Music - Sheet Music—B. Baker	Above the Car Barn	Magic Kingdom
Renie Bardeau	Kingdom Photo Services - Renie Bardeau Photographer, Archivist	Above Main Street Photo Supply	Disneyland
H. Draegart Barnard	Real Estate—Houses Bought and Sold, H. Draegart Barnard	Above the Disney Clothiers	Disneyland
Tony Baxter	Main Street Marvels - Tony Baxter Inventor "Imagination is at the heart of our Creations"	Above the Magic Shoppe	Disneyland
Tony Baxter	The Camelot Core—Road Show Installations—Tony Baxter, Dave Burkhart, Ed Johnson, Gary Younger		Magic Kingdom
Tony Baxter	Main Street Gazette - Since 1867 - "We Print the News Before It Happens" - Martin Sklar, Editor-in-Chief - Tony Baxter, Managing Editor	Above the Main Street Gazette	Disneyland Paris
Mary Blair	Center Street - Painting & Sculpture - Collin Campbell, Herbert Ryman, Blaine Gibson, Mary Blair, Dorothea Redmond		Magic Kingdom
Wally Boag	Golden Vaudeville Routines - Wally Boag - Prop.	Above the Carnation Company	Disneyland
Chuck Boyajian	Royal Care Co. - We Keep Your Castle Shining - Chuck Boyajian - Prop.	Above the Market House	Disneyland
Charles Boyer	Partners Portrait Gallery - Charles Boyer, Master Illustrator	Above the Emporium	Disneyland
C. "Randy" Bright	Photographic Studio - C. "Randy" Bright - Proprietor	Above Castle Bros.	Disneyland
Roger E. Broggie	"Can Do" Machine Works - Mechanical Wonders - Live Steam Engines - Magical Illusions - Cameras - Roger Broggie, Shopmaster - "Advisor to the Magic Makers"	Above the Main Street Magic Shop	Disneyland
Roger E. Broggie	Broggie's Buggies - Roger Broggie, Wheelwright - Wagons - Surreys - Sleighs	Corner of the Fire Station and Emporium	Magic Kingdom
Howard Brummitt	Walter E. Disney - Graduate School of Design & Master Planning - Instructors, Howard Brummitt, Marvin Davis, Fred Hope - Headmaster, Richard Irvine - Dean of Design, John Hench - Instructors, Vic Greene, Bill Martin, Chuck Myall	Above the Plaza Restaurant	Magic Kingdom
Ed Bullard	Project Detective Agency Private Investigations - We Never Sleep - Ed Bullard, Investigator	Above the Emporium	Magic Kingdom
Dave Burkhart	The Camelot Core—Road Show Installations—Tony Baxter, Dave Burkhart, Ed Johnson, Gary Younger		Magic Kingdom
Harriet Burns	The Artisans Loft - Handmade Miniatures By Harriet Burns	Above Carriage Place Clothing Company	Disneyland
Bruce Bushman	Ship Models - Bushman & Dagradi - Mfgs.	Above the Market House	Disneyland

== C ==
Name	Inscription	Location	Park
Collin Campbell	Center Street - Painting & Sculpture - Collin Campbell, Herbert Ryman, Blaine Gibson, Mary Blair, Dorothea Redmond		Magic Kingdom
John Louis Catone	John Louis Catone — Locksmith	Above the Mad Hatter	Disneyland
Ken Chapman	Golden State Graphic Arts Studio - Latest Artistic Principles Employed - Ken Chapman, Paul Hartley, Sam McKim, Elmer Plummer, Ernie Prinzhorn		Magic Kingdom
Royal Clark	United Audit - Book Keeping - Accounts Auditor - Royal Clark - Mgr.	Above the Carnation Co.	Disneyland
Claude Coats	Coats & Co. - Claude Coats Proprietor	Above the Emporium Annex	Disneyland
Claude Coats	Big Top Theatrical - Claude Coats, Marc Davis, John De Cuir, Bill Justice	Above the Main Street Athletic Club	Magic Kingdom
Lee A. Cockerell	The Main Street Diary - "True Tales of Inspiration" - Lee A. Cockerell, Editor-in-Chief	Above the Watches Store	Magic Kingdom
Malcolm Cobb	Daughterland Modeling Agency - Instruction in the Arts & Crafts - What Every Young Girl Should Know! - Bob Sewell, Counselor - Malcolm Cobb, Jack Fergus, Fred Joerger, Mitz Natsume	Above Uptown Jewelers	Magic Kingdom
Renie Conley	Milady Fashions Renie — Dressmaking, hemstitching & picating	Above the Carnation Cafe	Disneyland
Ray Conway	Carpenters & Joiners - George Mills - Ray Conway - Chas Alexander	Above the Market House	Disneyland
Jim Cora	Global Exports and Expats - Specializing in Land & Sea Operations - Our Motto: "The Sun Never Sets on our Magical Kingdoms" - Jim Cora, Master Operator	Above Disney Clothiers	Disneyland
Charles Corson	New Era Band & Choir Studio- If It's New, It's the Latest -Instruction – Talent Agents - Robert Jani, Bandmaster - Charles Corson, Casting Director	Above the Emporium	Magic Kingdom
W. Dennis "Bill" Cottrell	W. Dennis Cottrell, Detective Agency, Private Investigator. "We Never Sleep"	Above the Market House	Disneyland
Meg Crofton	Center for Leadership Development & Mentoring, Meg Gilbert Crofton, "We start leaders on their journeys"	Across from Crystal Arts Store	Magic Kingdom
Peter Crimmings	Windermere Fraternal Hall - “Lodge Meetings Every Friday” - Charter Members - Bob Allen, Pete Crimmings, Dick Evans, Bill Hoelscher, Bob Mathieson, Bill Sullivan	Center Street - Above Crystal Arts	Magic Kingdom
Roland Fargo "Rolly" Crump	Fargo's Palm Parlor - Predictions That Will Haunt You – Bazaar, Whimsical & Weird – “Designs to Die For” – Roland F. Crump – Assistant to the Palm Reader	Above Fargo's Palm Parlor	Disneyland

== D ==
Name	Inscription	Location	Park
Don DaGradi	Ship Models - Bushman & Dagradi - Mfgs.	Above the Market House	Disneyland
Hank Dains	The Back Lot - Props & Scenic Backdrop - Frank Millington, Chuck Fowler, Hank Dains, Marshall Smelser	Center Street-Above Crystal Arts	Magic Kingdom
Alice Davis	Small World Costume Co. - Alice Davis - Seamstress to the Stars	Above Disneyana	Disneyland
Marc Davis	Far East Imports - Exotic Art - Marc Davis - Proprietor	Above Disneyana	Disneyland
Marc Davis	Big Top Theatrical - Claude Coats, Marc Davis, John DeCuir, Bill Justice	Above the Main Street Athletic Club	Magic Kingdom
Marvin Davis	Richard Irvine - Marvin Davis	Above Main Street Bank	Disneyland
Marvin Davis	Walter E. Disney - Graduate School of Design & Master Planning - Instructors, Howard Brummitt, Marvin Davis, Fred Hope - Headmaster, Richard Irvine - Dean of Design, John Hench - Instructors, Vic Greene, Bill Martin, Chuck Myall	Above the Plaza Restaurant	Magic Kingdom
John DeCuir	Big Top Theatrical - Claude Coats, Marc Davis, John DeCuir, Bill Justice	Above the Main Street Athletic Club	Magic Kingdom
Abigail Disney	Sailmaker - Roy E. Disney - Specializing in the Gentlemanly Sport of Racing at Sea - Sailing Lessons - Aboard the Ketch Peregrina - Patty Disney, First Mate - Roy Patrick, Abigail - Susan, Timothy	Above Crystal Arts	Magic Kingdom
Elias Disney	Elias Disney - Contractor - Est. 1895	Above the Emporium	Disneyland
Elias Disney	Elias Disney - Contractor - Est. 1895	Center Street - Above Uptown Jewelers	Magic Kingdom
Patricia Disney	Sailmaker - Roy E. Disney - Specializing in the Gentlemanly Sport of Racing at Sea - Sailing Lessons - Aboard the Ketch Peregrina - Patty Disney, First Mate - Roy Patrick, Abigail - Susan, Timothy	Above Crystal Arts	Magic Kingdom
Roy E. Disney	Sailmaker - Roy E. Disney - Specializing in the Gentlemanly Sport of Racing at Sea - Sailing Lessons - Aboard the Ketch Peregrina - Patty Disney, First Mate - Roy Patrick, Abigail - Susan, Timothy	Above Crystal Arts	Magic Kingdom
Roy E. Disney	Pyewacket Cruise Lines - For a Day You Will Treasure Book a Cruise That's a "Pleasure" - Capt. Roy E. Disney	Above Ribbons & Bows Hat Shop	Disneyland Paris
Roy O. Disney	"If We Can Dream It - We Can Do It!" - Roy O. Disney - Dreamers & Doers Development Co.	Above the Main Street Confectionery	Magic Kingdom
Roy O. Disney	Two Brothers Inc. - Dreamers & Doers - "If we can Dream it we can Do it!" - Roy O. Disney, Walt E. Disney, Founders and Partners	Above Delicious Sweets	Disneyland Paris
Roy Patrick Disney	Sailmaker - Roy E. Disney - Specializing in the Gentlemanly Sport of Racing at Sea - Sailing Lessons - Aboard the Ketch Peregrina - Patty Disney, First Mate - Roy Patrick, Abigail - Susan, Timothy	Above Crystal Arts	Magic Kingdom
Susan Disney	Sailmaker - Roy E. Disney - Specializing in the Gentlemanly Sport of Racing at Sea - Sailing Lessons - Aboard the Ketch Peregrina - Patty Disney, First Mate - Roy Patrick, Abigail - Susan, Timothy	Above Crystal Arts	Magic Kingdom
Tim Disney	Sailmaker - Roy E. Disney - Specializing in the Gentlemanly Sport of Racing at Sea - Sailing Lessons - Aboard the Ketch Peregrina - Patty Disney, First Mate - Roy Patrick, Abigail - Susan, Timothy	Above Crystal Arts	Magic Kingdom
Walt Disney	Open Since '55 - Disneyland Casting Agency - "It takes People to Make the Dream a Reality" - Walter Elias Disney, Founder & Director Emeritus	Main Street Cinema	Disneyland
Walt Disney	Open Since '71 - Magic Kingdom Casting Agency - "It takes People to Make the Dream a Reality" - Walter Elias Disney, Founder & Director Emeritus	Main Street Cinema	Magic Kingdom
Walt Disney	Walter E. Disney - Graduate School of Design & Master Planning - Instructors, Howard Brummitt, Marvin Davis, Fred Hope - Headmaster, Richard Irvine - Dean of Design, John Hench - Instructors, Vic Greene, Bill Martin, Chuck Myall	Above the Plaza Restaurant	Magic Kingdom
Walt Disney	Walt Disney World Railroad Office - Keeping Dreams on Track - Walter E. Disney, Chief Engineer	Above the Railroad Station	Magic Kingdom
Walt Disney	Two Brothers Inc. - Dreamers & Doers - "If we can Dream it we can Do it!" - Roy O. Disney, Walt E. Disney, Founders and Partners	Above Delicious Sweets	Disneyland Paris
Ron Dominguez	Orange Grove Property Mgt. - "We Care For Your Property As If It Were Our Own" - Ron Dominguez - Owner	Above the Market House	Disneyland

== E ==
Name	Inscription	Location	Park
Don Edgren	Yesmen Engineering Associates - No Challenge Too Big for our Yes Men - We know No "No" - Don Edgren, Chief Engineer	Above the Silhouette Studio	Disneyland
Michael Eisner	Conducted Daily - Main Street Marching Band - Leading the Parade since 1884 - Conductors, Michael Eisner, Frank Wells - "We Work While You Whistle"	Above the Emporium	Disneyland Paris
Peter Ellenshaw	Plaza School of Art - Instructors - Herbert Ryman - John Hench - Peter Ellenshaw	Above Main Street Photo Supply Company	Disneyland
Tom Elrod	Main Street Gazette - Advertisers Welcomed - Publicity Experts At Your Service! - Jean-Marie Gerbeaux, Tom Elrod	Above the Main Street Gazette	Disneyland Paris
Greg A. Emmer	The Cast Doctor Celebrating Our 50th - Operating in Many Lands Around the World - "Every Cast a Perfect Fit" - Greg A. Emmer - Specializing in Casting Since '68	Above the Main Street Cinema	Disneyland
Dick Evans	Windermere Fraternal Hall - “Lodge Meetings Every Friday” - Charter Members - Bob Allen, Pete Crimmings, Dick Evans, Bill Hoelscher, Bob Mathieson, Bill Sullivan	Center Street - Above Crystal Arts	Magic Kingdom
Morgan "Bill" Evans	Evans Gardens - Exotic & Rare Species - Freeway Collections - Est. 1910 - Morgan (Bill) Evans - Senior Partner	Above the Opera House	Disneyland
Morgan "Bill" Evans	You Show 'em - Morgan Evans DTS, Tony Virginia ATS	Above Crystal Arts	Magic Kingdom
Spin Evans	Evans and Markham Advertising - Products Tested	Above the Liberty Arcade	Disneyland Paris

== F ==
Name	Inscription	Location	Park
Mark Feary	Main Street Gazette - Classified Department - We Demonstrate the Highest Regard for Truth In Advertising - Honest - Mark Feary, Ron Kollen	Above the Main Street Gazette	Disneyland Paris
Jack Fergus	Daughterland Modeling Agency - Instruction in the Arts & Crafts - What Every Young Girl Should Know! - Bob Sewell, Counselor - Malcolm Cobb, Jack Fergus, Fred Joerger, Mitz Natsume	Above Uptown Jewelers	Magic Kingdom
Orlando Ferrante	Pico Organization - Installation & Coordination of World Class Projects - "We Never Sleep - In Any Time Zone" - Orlando Ferrante, Founder	Above the Market House	Disneyland
Orlando Ferrante	The Original Dick Nunis Gym Turkish Baths – Massage Parlor 24 Hour Service Supervisor Dick Nunis, Night Manager Ron Miller, Masseur O. Ferrante	Above the Main Street Bakery	Magic Kingdom
Van Arsdale France	Van Arsdale France - Founder and Professor Emeritus - Disney Universities	Above the space between Great American Pastimes and the Main Street Magic Shop	Disneyland
Bob Foster	Pseudonym Real Estate Dev. Co. - Roy Davis President, Bob Price Vice-President, Bob Foster Travelling Rep.		Magic Kingdom
Chuck Fowler	The Back Lot - Props & Scenic Backdrop - Frank Millington, Chuck Fowler, Hank Dains, Marshall Smelser	Center Street-Above Crystal Arts	Magic Kingdom

== G ==
Name	Inscription	Location	Park
Jean-Marie Gerbeaux	Main Street Gazette - Advertisers Welcomed - Publicity Experts At Your Service! - Jean-Marie Gerbeaux, Tom Elrod	Above the Main Street Gazette	Disneyland Paris
Blaine Gibson	The Busy Hands School - Sculpting, Whittling & Soap Carving & Blaine Gibson - The Eternal Pursuit of the Artists Craft	Above the Opera House	Disneyland
Blaine Gibson	Center Street - Painting & Sculpture - Collin Campbell, Herbert Ryman, Blaine Gibson, Mary Blair, Dorothea Redmond		Magic Kingdom
D. S. Gilmore	D. S. Gilmore, MD - E. G. Upjohn, MD	Above New Century Timepieces	Disneyland
Yale Gracey	Buena Vista Magic Lantern Slides - Treat Your Friends To Our Special Tricks - Yale Gracey, Bud Martin, Ken O'Brien, Wathel Rogers	Above the Main Street Confectionery	Magic Kingdom
Vic Greene	Walter E. Disney - Graduate School of Design & Master Planning - Instructors, Howard Brummitt, Marvin Davis, Fred Hope - Headmaster, Richard Irvine - Dean of Design, John Hench - Instructors, Vic Greene, Bill Martin, Chuck Myall	Above the Plaza Restaurant	Magic Kingdom
Bob Gurr	Leading the rare to the future – Meteor Cycle Co. – Our vehicles pass the test of time – Fast, Faultless, and Fadless – Bob Gurr – Design Impresario	Above the Disney Clothiers	Disneyland
Bob Gurr	The Big Wheel Co. - Horseless Carriages - Bob Gurr	Above Main Street Fashion and Apparel	Magic Kingdom

== H ==
Name	Inscription	Location	Park
J. S. Hamel	J.S. Hamel - Consulting Engineer	Above the Main Street Bank	Disneyland
Paul Hartley	Golden State Graphic Arts Studio - Latest Artistic Principles Employed - Ken Chapman, Paul Hartley, Sam McKim, Elmer Plummer, Ernie Prinzhorn		Magic Kingdom
John Hench	Plaza School of Art - Instructors - Herbert Ryman - John Hench - Peter Ellenshaw	Above Main Street Photo Supply Company	Disneyland
John Hench	Walter E. Disney - Graduate School of Design & Master Planning - Instructors, Howard Brummitt, Marvin Davis, Fred Hope - Headmaster, Richard Irvine - Dean of Design, John Hench - Instructors, Vic Greene, Bill Martin, Chuck Myall	Above the Plaza Restaurant	Magic Kingdom
Bill Hoelscher	Windermere Fraternal Hall - “Lodge Meetings Every Friday” - Charter Members - Bob Allen - Pete Crimmings, Dick Evans, Bill Hoelscher, Bob Mathieson, Bill Sullivan	Center Street - Above Crystal Arts	Magic Kingdom
Fred Hope	Walter E. Disney - Graduate School of Design & Master Planning - Instructors, Howard Brummitt, Marvin Davis, Fred Hope - Headmaster, Richard Irvine - Dean of Design, John Hench - Instructors, Vic Greene, Bill Martin, Chuck Myall	Above the Plaza Restaurant	Magic Kingdom

== I ==
Name	Inscription	Location	Park
Alexander R. Irvine	Alexander Irvine, M.D.	Above the Baby Care Center	Disneyland
Richard Irvine	Richard Irvine - Marvin Davis	Above Main Street Bank	Disneyland
Richard Irvine	Walter E. Disney - Graduate School of Design & Master Planning - Instructors, Howard Brummitt, Marvin Davis, Fred Hope - Headmaster, Richard Irvine - Dean of Design, John Hench - Instructors, Vic Greene, Bill Martin, Chuck Myall	Above the Plaza Restaurant	Magic Kingdom
Don Iwerks	Iwerks-Iwerks Stereoscopic Cameras - Ub Iwerks, Don Iwerks - Repairs, Modifications	Above the Main Street Bakery	Magic Kingdom
Ub Iwerks	Iwerks-Iwerks Stereoscopic Cameras - Ub Iwerks, Don Iwerks - Repairs, Modifications	Above the Main Street Bakery	Magic Kingdom

== J ==
Name	Inscription	Location	Park
Robert F. Jani	Main Street Electrical Parade World Headquarters – Robert F Jani, Master Showman	Above the Opera House	Disneyland
Robert F. Jani	New Era Band & Choir Studio- If It's New, It's the Latest -Instruction – Talent Agents - Robert Jani, Bandmaster - Charles Corson, Casting Director	Above the Emporium	Magic Kingdom
Fred Joerger	Decorative Fountains and Watercolor - By Fred Joerger	Above the Carnation Co.	Disneyland
Fred Joerger	Daughterland Modeling Agency - Instruction in the Arts & Crafts - What Every Young Girl Should Know! - Bob Sewell, Counselor - Malcolm Cobb, Jack Fergus, Fred Joerger, Mitz Natsume	Above Uptown Jewelers	Magic Kingdom
Ed Johnson	The Camelot Core—Road Show Installations—Tony Baxter, Dave Burkhart, Ed Johnson, Gary Younger		Magic Kingdom
Merlin Jones	M. Jones Electronics - Edison Talking Machines	Above the Liberty Arcade	Disneyland Paris
Bill Justice	New Century Character Company - Custom Character Design and Parade Illuminations - Bill Justice, Master Delineator	Above the Main Street Cone Shop	Disneyland
Bill Justice	Big Top Theatrical - Claude Coats, Marc Davis, John DeCuir, Bill Justice	Above the Main Street Athletic Club	Magic Kingdom

== K ==
Name	Inscription	Location	Park
Ron Kollen	Main Street Gazette - Classified Department - We Demonstrate the Highest Regard for Truth In Advertising - Honest - Mark Feary, Ron Kollen	Above the Main Street Gazette	Disneyland Paris
Emile Kuri	Emile Kuri - Interior Decorator	Above the Market House	Disneyland

== L ==
Name	Inscription	Location	Park
Bruce Laval	Partners in Planning - B. Laval & Associates - "What We Build Together Can Last Forever"	Above Watches Store	Magic Kingdom
Fred Leopold	Attorney at Law - Youngman & Leopold	Above the Disneyana Shop	Disneyland
Gunther R. Lessing	Gunther R. Lessing, Esq.	Above the Disneyana Shop	Disneyland
Jack Lindquist	J. B. Lindquist - Honorary Mayor of Disneyland - "Jack of All Trades. Master of Fun"	Above City Hall	Disneyland
Jack Lindquist	Peterson Travel Agency - Reservations by Cable Anywhere in the World - Passages Boarded By Sea & Rail - “Exclusive Representatives for the Titanic”- Jack Lindquist, Purser	Above the Emporium	Magic Kingdom
Ron Logan	Main Street Music Co. - Ron Logan - Conductor - Leading the Band into a New Century	Above the Emporium	Magic Kingdom

== M ==
Name	Inscription	Location	Park
Mary Anne Mang	Good Neighbor Foundation - "Caring and Giving Come From the Heart" - Mrs. M. A. Mang - Director	Above New Century Timepieces	Disneyland
Marty Markham	Evans and Markham Advertising - Products Tested	Above the Liberty Arcade	Disneyland Paris
Pete Markham	Construction Company - General Contractor - Pete Markham - Engineer	Forth window above Confectionery, Main Street	Magic Kingdom
Bill Martin	Walter E. Disney - Graduate School of Design & Master Planning - Instructors, Howard Brummitt, Marvin Davis, Fred Hope - Headmaster, Richard Irvine - Dean of Design, John Hench - Instructors, Vic Greene, Bill Martin, Chuck Myall	Above the Plaza Restaurant	Magic Kingdom
Bud Martin	Buena Vista Magic Lantern Slides - Treat Your Friends To Our Special Tricks - Yale Gracey, Bud Martin, Ken O'Brien, Wathel Rogers	Above the Main Street Confectionery	Magic Kingdom
Ivan Martin	Buena Vista Construction Co. - Jack Rorex - Ivan Martin - Cash Shockey	Above the Market House	Disneyland
Wilson "Bill" Martin	Wilson Martin - Gabriel Scognamillo	Above the Main Street Bank	Disneyland
Stanley "Stan" Maslak		Main Street Walt Disney World	Walt Disney World
Bob Matheison	Community Service Recruitment Center - Bob Mathieson - Quality, Integrity & Dedication	Above Plaza Ice Cream	Magic Kingdom
Bob Matheison	Windermere Fraternal Hall - “Lodge Meetings Every Friday” - Charter Members - Bob Allen, Pete Crimmings, Dick Evans, Bill Hoelscher, Bob Mathieson, Bill Sullivan	Center Street - Above Crystal Arts	Magic Kingdom
Sam McKim	Cartography Masterworks – Sam McKim – Map Maker to the Kingdom – “There’s Magic in the Details”	Above the Main Street Photo Supply Company	Disneyland
Sam McKim	Golden State Graphic Arts Studio - Latest Artistic Principles Employed - Ken Chapman, Paul Hartley, Sam McKim, Elmer Plummer, Ernie Prinzhorn		Magic Kingdom
Edward T. Meck	The Disneyland News - Edward T. Meck - Editor In Chief	Above the China Closet	Disneyland
Christopher D. Miller	Christopher D. Miller - Turkish Baths	Above the restrooms at the Carnation Co.	Disneyland
Ron Miller	The Original Dick Nunis Gym Turkish Baths – Massage Parlor 24 Hour Service Supervisor Dick Nunis, Night Manager Ron Miller, Masseur O. Ferrante	Above the Main Street Bakery	Magic Kingdom
Frank Millington	The Back Lot - Props & Scenic Backdrop - Frank Millington, Chuck Fowler, Hank Dains, Marshall Smelser	Center Street-Above Crystal Arts	Magic Kingdom
George Mills	Carpenters & Joiners - George Mills - Ray Conway - Chas Alexander	Above the Market House	Disneyland
Seb Morey	Seb Morey - Taxidermist	Above the Market House	Disneyland
Chuck Myall	Walter E. Disney - Graduate School of Design & Master Planning - Instructors, Howard Brummitt, Marvin Davis, Fred Hope - Headmaster, Richard Irvine - Dean of Design, John Hench - Instructors, Vic Greene, Bill Martin, Chuck Myall	Above the Plaza Restaurant	Magic Kingdom

== N ==
Name	Inscription	Location	Park
Tom Nabbe	Sawyer Fence Painting - Tom Nabbe - Proprietor	Above Main Street Cinema	Magic Kingdom
Mitz Natsume	Daughterland Modeling Agency - Instruction in the Arts & Crafts - What Every Young Girl Should Know! - Bob Sewell, Counselor - Malcolm Cobb, Jack Fergus, Fred Joerger, Mitz Natsume	Above Uptown Jewelers	Magic Kingdom
Jack Norworth	J. Norworth & A. Von Tilzer, Songwriters - Take Me Out To The Ball Game - Now Available in Sheet Music	Above the Music Hall	Disneyland Paris
Dick Nunis	Coast to Coast Peoplemoving, World Leader in Leisure Management, Dick Nunis Proprietor	Above Disney Showcase	Disneyland
Dick Nunis	The Original Dick Nunis Gym Turkish Baths – Massage Parlor 24 Hour Service Supervisor Dick Nunis, Night Manager Ron Miller, Masseur O. Ferrante	Above the Main Street Bakery	Magic Kingdom

== O ==
Name	Inscription	Location	Park
Ken O'Brien	Buena Vista Magic Lantern Slides - Treat Your Friends To Our Special Tricks - Yale Gracey, Bud Martin, Ken O'Brien, Wathel Rogers	Above the Main Street Confectionery	Magic Kingdom

== P ==
Name	Inscription	Location	Park
George Patrick	Wade B. Rubotton - George Patrick	Above the Main Street Bank	Disneyland
C. V. Patterson	C. F. Allen, MD - C. V. Patterson, MD	Above New Century Timepieces	Disneyland
Bob Penfield	Club 55 School of Golf - Bob Penfield, Instructor	Above Coca-Cola Refreshment Corner	Disneyland
Bob Phelps	Town Square Tailors - Tailors to the Presidents - Bob Phelps, Prop.	Above the Chapeau Hat Shoppe	Magic Kingdom
Owen Pope	Owen Pope - Harness Maker - “Saddles A Specialty” - Feed & Grain Supplies	Above the Car Barn	Magic Kingdom
Digby Popham	Digby's Messenger Service	Above the Market House Delicatessen	Disneyland Paris
Joe Potter	General Joe's Building Permits Licensed in Florida Gen. Joe Potter, Raconteur	Above Confectionery	Magic Kingdom
Harrison "Buzz" Price	Founded 1955 - Price Is Right Land Company - Call On Our Numbers Man For The Best Price! - Harrison "Buzz" Price - Founder & Finder - We Never Say "No" "Yes" Makes More Cents!	Front of the former Guided Tours building	Disneyland
Elmer Plummer	Golden State Graphic Arts Studio - Latest Artistic Principles Employed - Ken Chapman, Paul Hartley, Sam McKim, Elmer Plummer, Ernie Prinzhorn		Magic Kingdom
Ernie Prizhorn	Golden State Graphic Arts Studio - Latest Artistic Principles Employed - Ken Chapman, Paul Hartley, Sam McKim, Elmer Plummer, Ernie Prinzhorn		Magic Kingdom

== R ==
Name	Inscription	Location	Park
Dorothea Redmond	Center Street - Painting & Sculpture - Collin Campbell, Herbert Ryman, Blaine Gibson, Mary Blair, Dorothea Redmond		Magic Kingdom
Cicely Rigdon	Ambassador Finishing School - Cicely Rigdon - Instructor	Above the China Closet Store	Disneyland
Wathel Rogers	"You'll Cut A Fine Figure" - Wathel Rogers - Menswear	Above New Century Jewelry	Disneyland
Wathel Rogers	Buena Vista Magic Lantern Slides - Treat Your Friends To Our Special Tricks - Yale Gracey, Bud Martin, Ken O'Brien, Wathel Rogers	Above the Main Street Confectionery	Magic Kingdom
Jack Rorex	Buena Vista Construction Co. - Jack Rorex - Ivan Martin - Cash Shockey	Above the Market House	Disneyland
L. H. Roth	Surveying & Engineering - L. H. Roth	Above the Market House	Disneyland
Wade B. Rubottom	Wade B. Rubottom - George Patrick	Above the Main Street Bank	Disneyland
Herbert Ryman	Plaza School of Art - Instructors - Herbert Ryman - John Hench - Peter Ellenshaw	Above Main Street Photo Supply Company	Disneyland
Herbert Ryman	Center Street - Painting & Sculpture - Collin Campbell, Herbert Ryman, Blaine Gibson, Mary Blair, Dorothea Redmond		Magic Kingdom

== S ==
Name	Inscription	Location	Park
Gabriel Scognamillo	Wilson Martin - Gabriel Scognamillo	Above the Main Street Bank	Disneyland
Richard M. Sherman	Two Brothers Tunemakers - Richard M. Sherman and Robert B. Sherman - “We’ll Write Your Tune For A Song!”	At the 20th Century Music Company	Disneyland
Robert B. Sherman	Two Brothers Tunemakers - Richard M. Sherman and Robert B. Sherman - “We’ll Write Your Tune For A Song!”	At the 20th Century Music Company	Disneyland
Cash Shockey	Buena Vista Construction Co. - Jack Rorex - Ivan Martin - Cash Shockey	Above the Market House	Disneyland
Marty Sklar	Main Street College of Arts & Sciences - Martin A. Sklar, Dean	City Hall	Disneyland
Marty Sklar	Main Street Gazette - Since 1867 - "We Print the News Before It Happens" - Martin Sklar, Editor-in-Chief - Tony Baxter, Managing Editor	Above Main Street Gazette	Disneyland Paris
Marshall Smelser	The Back Lot - Props & Scenic Backdrop - Frank Millington, Chuck Fowler, Hank Dains, Marshall Smelser	Center Street-Above Crystal Arts	Magic Kingdom
Dave Smith	New Century Historical Society - Dave Smith - Town Archivist - Preserving, Protecting & Presenting Our Fond Memories of the Past	Above the Fortuosity Shop	Disneyland
Bill Sullivan	Windermere Fraternal Hall - “Lodge Meetings Every Friday” - Charter Members - Bob Allen - Pete Crimmings, Dick Evans, Bill Hoelscher, Bob Mathieson, Bill Sullivan	Center Street - Above Crystal Arts	Magic Kingdom
Bill Sullivan	Sully's Safaris & Guide Service - Chief Guide	Above Plaza Ice Cream	Magic Kingdom

== T ==
Name	Inscription	Location	Park
Donn Tatum	M.T. Lott Co. Real Estate Investments - “A Friend in Deeds is a Friend Indeed” - Donn Tatum, President - Subsidiaries: Tomahawk Properties, Latin American Development, Ayefour Corporation, Bay Lake Properties, Reedy Creek Ranch Lands, Compass East Corporation	Above Crystal Arts	Magic Kingdom

== U ==
Name	Inscription	Location	Park
E. G. Upjohn	D. S. Gilmore, MD - E. G. Upjohn, MD	Above the Fortuosity Shop	Disneyland

== V ==
Name	Inscription	Location	Park
Tony Virginia	You Show 'em - Morgan Evans DTS, Tony Virginia ATS	Above Crystal Arts	Magic Kingdom
Albert Von Tilzer	J. Norworth & A. Von Tilzer, Songwriters - Take Me Out To The Ball Game - Now Available in Sheet Music	Above the Music Hall	Disneyland Paris

== W ==
Name	Inscription	Location	Park
Card Walker	Dr. Card Walker - Licensed Practitioner of Psychiatry - And Justice of the Peace - “We Never Close” (Except for Golf)	Above the Emporium	Magic Kingdom
Ray Van De Warker	Ragin Ray's – River Rafting Expeditions – Experienced Guides Since ’55 – Ray Van De Warker – Owner-Guide	Above the Mad Hatter	Disneyland
Robert "Bud" Washo	Robert Washo – Stone Mason	Above the Market House	Disneyland
Robert "Bud" Washo	Washo & Son Stone Mason Our Motto – “No Stone Unturned” Bud Washo, Bill Washo	Above Main Street Bakery	Magic Kingdom
Bill Washo	Washo & Son Stone Mason Our Motto – “No Stone Unturned” Bud Washo, Bill Washo	Above Main Street Bakery	Magic Kingdom
Bob Weis	Bob Weis Studio Head - "Our Productions Entertain the World"	Above Hollywood Boulevard	Disney Hollywood Studios Walt Disney World
Frank Wells	Seven Summits Expeditions - Frank G. Wells, President - For Those Who Want To Do It All	Above the Main Street Bank	Disneyland
Frank Wells	Seven Summits Expeditions - Frank G. Wells, President - "For Those Who Want To Do It All"	Above Crystal Arts	Magic Kingdom
Frank Wells	Conducted Daily - Main Street Marching Band - Leading the Parade since 1884 - Conductors, Michael Eisner, Frank Wells - "We Work While You Whistle"	Above the Emporium	Disneyland Paris
William T. Wheeler	William T. Wheeler - John Wise - Structural Engineers	Above the Main Street Bank	Disneyland
George Whitney	Geo. Whitney - Guns	Above the Market House	Disneyland
Ed Winger	Old Settlers - Gold Dredging - Ed Winger - Proprietor	Above the Carnation Co.	Disneyland
John Wise	William T. Wheeler - John Wise - Structural Engineers	Above the Main Street Bank	Disneyland

== Y ==
Name	Inscription	Location	Park
Gary Younger	The Camelot Core—Road Show Installations—Tony Baxter, Dave Burkhart, Ed Johnson, Gary Younger		Magic Kingdom
Gordon Youngman	Attorney at Law - Youngman & Leopold	Above Disneyana	Disneyland

== Other windows ==
=== Windows in Frontierland ===
Name	Inscription	Location	Park
Glenn Hicks	Texas Glenn's Honey Bee Farm—“Our Bees are Real Hummers”—Glenn Hicks Proprietor	Above Bonanza Outfitters	Disneyland
Fess Parker	Davy Crockett - Coonskin Cap Supply Co - Fess Parker Proprietor	Above Pioneer Mercantile	Disneyland

=== Windows in Adventureland ===
Name	Inscription	Location	Park
Harper Goff	Oriental Tattooing by Prof. Harper Goff - Banjo Lessons	Above The Bazaar	Disneyland

=== Windows in Mickey's Toontown ===
Name	Inscription	Location	Park
Walter Elias Disney	Laugh-O-gram Films, Inc. - A Reel of Fun - W.E. Disney, Directing Animator	Above City Hall & the Five & Dime	Disneyland

== See also ==
- Main Street, U.S.A.
