= Disney Legends =

Award given by the Walt Disney Company

Coordinates: 34°9′29.7″N 118°19′34.2″W

- Awarded for: Outstanding contribution to The Walt Disney Company
- Presented by: The Walt Disney Company
- First award: 1987; 39 years ago
- Website: d23.com/disney-legends/
- Disney Legends award

Disney Legends is a Hall of Fame award that is awarded by the Walt Disney Company to people who have "made a significant impact on the Disney legacy". The honor, established in 1987, was initially awarded annually in a special private ceremony. Since 2009, it has been awarded biennially at Disney's D23 Expo.

In 2024, the Disney Legends awards ceremony was moved from D23 Expo's traditional venue at the Anaheim Convention Center to the larger Honda Center down the street and was hosted by Ryan Seacrest. The ceremony was recorded and made available for streaming the next day on Disney+.

== Criteria ==
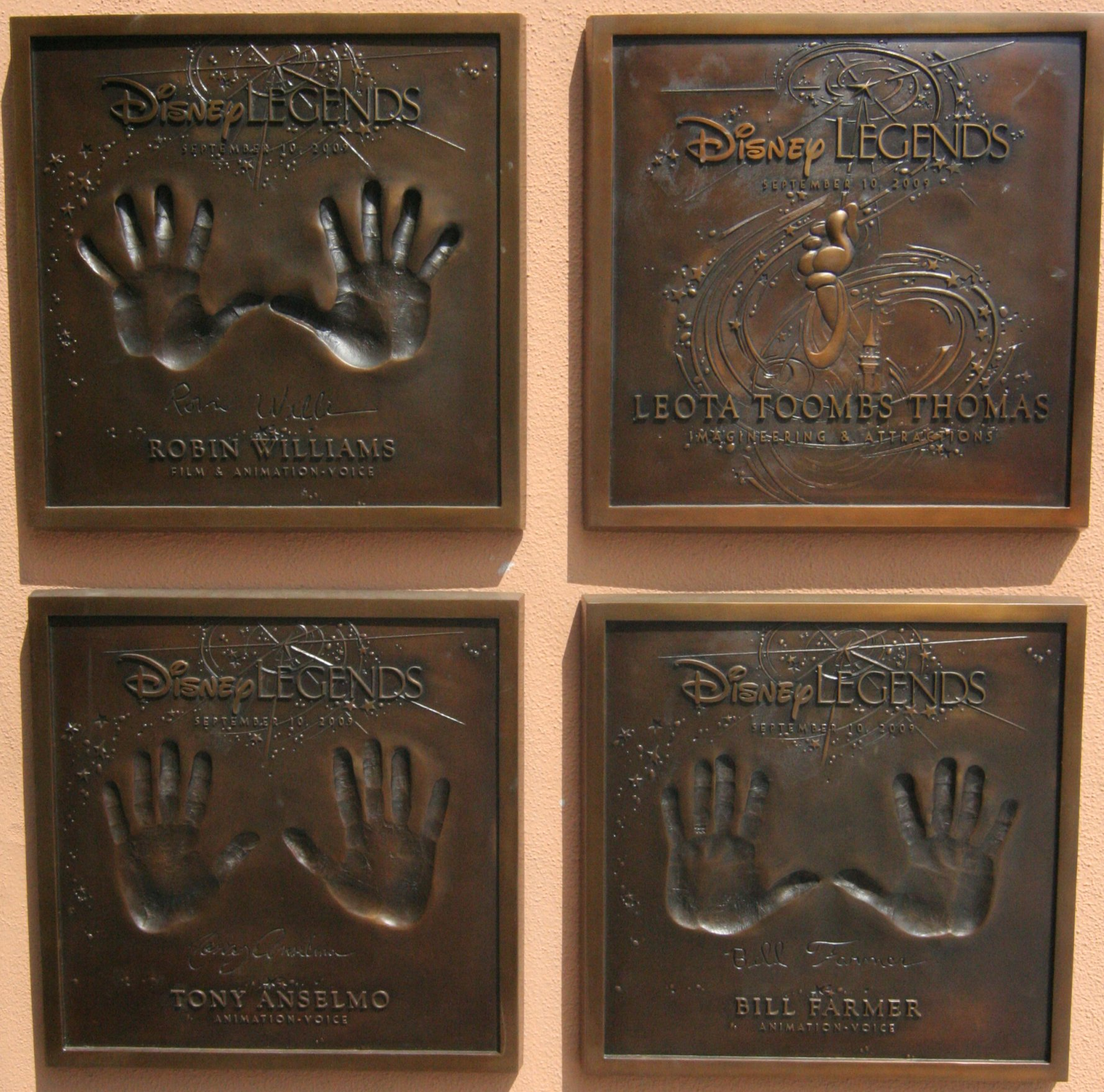
Examples of the Disney Legends plaques: living recipients with handprints and the award's insignia for posthumous recipients.

Recipients are chosen by a selection committee. The committee consists of long-time Disney executives, historians, and other authorities. Besides the award statuette itself, each honoree is represented by a bronze commemorative plaque featuring the recipients' handprints and signature if they were living when inducted, or simply an image of the statuette emblem if the induction was posthumous. The plaques are placed on display in Legends Plaza at the Walt Disney Studios in Burbank, California, across from the Michael D. Eisner Building.

== The award ==
The award was designed by sculptor and Imagineering alumnus Andrea Favilli. Favilli personally casts the award in bronze every two years for D23’s culminating event, the Disney Legends Awards ceremony. The design of the Disney Legends Award draws inspiration from Walt Disney’s Fantasia. The sculpture depicts an unraveling cinematic film spool that transforms into the hand of Mickey Mouse (as the Sorcerer's Apprentice) holding a star-tipped magic wand.

In addition to the handheld award, Favilli created a monumental 14-foot bronze sculptural version that serves as the focal point of the Disney Legends Plaza at The Walt Disney Studios in Burbank, California and unveiled to commemorate the 75th Anniversary of the company. A twin of this sculpture stands at the main entrance of Disneyland Paris. It was originally dedicated and unveiled in 1997 to commemorate the park’s fifth anniversary and was re-dedicated in 2002.

According to The Walt Disney Company, and Favilli’s written concept, the Disney Legends Award incorporates three symbolic elements representing the singular qualities of its recipients:

The Spiral represents imagination and the power of an idea.

The Hand symbolizes skill, discipline, and craftsmanship.

The Wand and the Star represent magic—the spark ignited when imagination and skill unite to create a new dream.

The first Disney Legends committee consisted of Dave Smith; Arlene Ludwig; Marty Sklar, Randy Bright; Jack Lindquist; Sharon Harwood; Art Levitt; Shelley Miles; Paula Sigman; Doris Smith; and Stacia Martin.

== Recipients ==
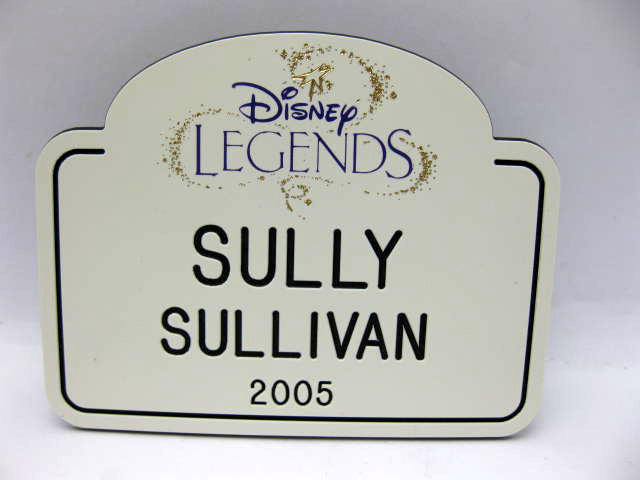
The nametag given to Disney Legends

1987 | 1989 | 1990 | 1991 | 1992 | 1993 | 1994 | 1995 | 1996 | 1997 | 1998 | 1999 | 2000 | 2001 | 2002 | 2003 | 2004 | 2005 | 2006 | 2007 | 2008 | 2009 | 2011 | 2013 | 2015 | 2017 | 2019 | 2022 | 2024 | 2026

= awarded posthumously

=== 1980s ===
==== Class of 1987 ====
- Fred MacMurray, Film

==== Class of 1989 ====
- Les Clark, Animation
- Marc Davis, Animation & Imagineering
- Ub Iwerks, Animation & Imagineering
- Ollie Johnston, Animation
- Milt Kahl, Animation
- Ward Kimball, Animation & Imagineering
- Eric Larson, Animation
- John Lounsbery, Animation
- Wolfgang Reitherman, Animation
- Frank Thomas, Animation

All except Iwerks were Disney's "Nine Old Men".

=== 1990s ===
==== Class of 1990 ====
- Roger Broggie, Imagineering
- Joe Fowler, Attractions
- John Hench, Animation & Imagineering
- Richard Irvine, Imagineering
- Herb Ryman, Imagineering
- Sherman Brothers, Music

==== Class of 1991 ====
- Ken Anderson, Animation & Imagineering
- Julie Andrews, Film
- Carl Barks, Animation & Publishing
- Mary Blair, Animation & Imagineering
- Claude Coats, Animation & Imagineering
- Don DaGradi, Animation & Film
- Sterling Holloway, Animation—Voice
- Fess Parker, Film & Television
- Bill Walsh, Film & Television

==== Class of 1992 ====
- Jimmie Dodd, Television
- Bill Evans, Imagineering
- Annette Funicello, Film & Television
- Joe Grant, Animation
- Jack Hannah, Animation
- Winston Hibler, Film
- Ken O'Connor, Animation & Imagineering
- Roy Williams, Animation & Television

==== Class of 1993 ====
- Pinto Colvig, Animation—Voice
- Buddy Ebsen, Film & Television
- Peter Ellenshaw, Film
- Blaine Gibson, Animation & Imagineering
- Harper Goff, Film & Imagineering
- Irving Ludwig, Film
- Jimmy MacDonald, Animation—Voice
- Clarence Nash, Animation—Voice
- Donn Tatum, Administration
- Card Walker, Administration

==== Class of 1994 ====
- Adriana Caselotti, Animation—Voice
- Bill Cottrell, Animation & Imagineering
- Marvin Davis, Film & Imagineering
- Van France, Attractions
- David Hand, Animation
- Jack Lindquist, Attractions
- Bill Martin, Imagineering
- Paul J. Smith, Music
- Frank Wells, Administration

==== Class of 1995 ====
- Wally Boag, Attractions
- Fulton Burley, Attractions
- Dean Jones, Film
- Angela Lansbury, Film
- Edward Meck, Attractions
- Fred Moore, Animation
- Thurl Ravenscroft, Animation—Voice
- Wathel Rogers, Imagineering
- Betty Taylor, Attractions

==== Class of 1996 ====
- Bob Allen, Attractions
- Rex Allen, Film & Television
- X Atencio, Animation & Imagineering
- Betty Lou Gerson, Animation—Voice
- Bill Justice, Animation & Imagineering
- Bob Matheison, Attractions
- Sam McKim, Imagineering
- Bob Moore, Animation & Film
- Bill Peet, Animation—Story

==== Class of 1997 ====
- Lucien Adés, Music
- Angel Angelopoulos, Publishing
- Antonio Bertini, Character Merchandise
- Armand Bigle, Character Merchandise
- Gaudenzio Capelli, Publishing
- Roberto de Leonardis, Film
- Cyril Edgar, Film
- Wally Feignoux, Film
- Didier Fouret, Publishing
- Mario Gentilini, Publishing
- Cyril James, Film & Merchandise
- Horst Koblischek, Character Merchandise
- Gunnar Mansson, Character Merchandise
- Arnoldo Mondadori, Publishing
- Armand Palivoda, Film
- Poul Brahe Pedersen, Publishing
- Joe Potter, Attractions
- André Vanneste, Character Merchandise
- Paul Winkler, Character Merchandise

==== Class of 1998 ====
- James Algar, Animation & Film
- Buddy Baker, Music
- Kathryn Beaumont, Animation—Voice
- Virginia Davis, Animation
- Roy E. Disney, Film, Animation & Administration
- Don Escen, Administration
- Wilfred Jackson, Animation
- Glynis Johns, Film
- Kay Kamen, Character Merchandise
- Paul Kenworthy, Film
- Larry Lansburgh, Film & Television
- Hayley Mills, Film
- Al Milotte and Elma Milotte, Film
- Norman "Stormy" Palmer, Film
- Lloyd L. Richardson, Film
- Kurt Russell, Film
- Ben Sharpsteen, Animation & Film
- Masatomo Takahashi, Administration
- Vladimir (Bill) Tytla, Animation
- Dick Van Dyke, Film
- Matsuo Yokoyama, Character Merchandise

==== Class of 1999 ====
- Tim Allen, Television, Film & Animation—Voice
- Mary Costa, Animation—Voice
- Norm Ferguson, Animation
- Bill Garity, Film
- Yale Gracey, Animation & Imagineering
- Al Konetzni, Character Merchandise
- Hamilton Luske, Animation
- Dick Nunis, Attractions
- Charlie Ridgway, Attractions

=== 2000s ===
==== Class of 2000 ====
- Grace Bailey, Animation
- Harriet Burns, Imagineering
- Joyce Carlson, Animation & Imagineering
- Ron Dominguez, Parks & Resorts
- Cliff Edwards, Animation—Voice
- Becky Fallberg, Animation
- Dick Jones, Animation—Voice
- Dodie Roberts, Animation
- Retta Scott, Animation
- Ruthie Tompson, Animation

==== Class of 2001 ====
- Howard Ashman, Music
- Bob Broughton, Film
- George Bruns, Music
- Frank Churchill, Music
- Leigh Harline, Music
- Fred Joerger, Imagineering
- Alan Menken, Music
- Martin Sklar, Imagineering
- Ned Washington, Music
- Tyrus Wong, Animation

==== Class of 2002 ====
Note: In honor of the opening of the Walt Disney Studios Park at Disneyland Paris, all 2002 inductees are of European origin. The ceremony was held in the Animation building at the new park on opening day.

- Ken Annakin, Film
- Hugh Attwooll, Film
- Maurice Chevalier, Film
- Phil Collins, Music
- Sir John Mills, Film
- Robert Newton, Film & Television
- Sir Tim Rice, Music
- Robert Stevenson, Film
- Richard Todd, Film & Television
- David Tomlinson, Film

==== Class of 2003 ====
Following a dispute between Roy E. Disney and the company that resulted in Disney departing, Robert Iger, the company's then-president and COO co-presented with Michael Eisner.

- Neil Beckett, Merchandise
- Tutti Camarata, Music
- Edna Francis Disney
- Lillian Disney
- Orlando Ferrante, Imagineering
- Richard Fleischer, Film
- Floyd Gottfredson, Animation
- Buddy Hackett, Film & Television
- Harrison "Buzz" Price, Research Economist
- Al Taliaferro, Cartoonist
- Ilene Woods, Music—Voice

==== Class of 2004 ====
- Bill Anderson, Film & Television
- Tim Conway, Film
- Rolly Crump, Imagineering
- Alice Davis, Imagineering
- Karen Dotrice, Film & Television
- Matthew Garber, Film
- Leonard H. Goldenson, Television
- Bob Gurr, Imagineering
- Ralph Kent, Imagineering & Attractions
- Irwin Kostal, Music
- Mel Shaw, Animation

==== Class of 2005 ====
In honor of Disneyland's 50th anniversary in 2005, all recipients are related to either Walt Disney Parks and Resorts and/or Walt Disney Imagineering, and nearly all have had some connection with Disneyland. Roy E. Disney again co-presented the awards, after a two-year hiatus and a return to the company.

- Chuck Abbott, Parks & Resorts
- Milt Albright, Parks & Resorts
- Hideo Amemiya, Parks & Resorts
- Hideo Aramaki, Parks & Resorts
- Charles Boyer, Parks & Resorts
- Randy Bright, Imagineering
- James Cora, Parks & Resorts
- Robert Jani, Parks & Resorts
- Mary Jones, Parks & Resorts
- Art Linkletter, Parks & Resorts
- Mary Anne Mang, Parks & Resorts
- Steve Martin, Parks & Resorts
- Tom Nabbe, Parks & Resorts
- Jack Olsen, Parks & Resorts
- Cicely Rigdon, Parks & Resorts
- William "Sully" Sullivan, Parks & Resorts
- Jack Wagner, Parks & Resorts
- Vesey Walker, Parks & Resorts

==== Class of 2006 ====
- Tim Considine, Television & Film
- Kevin Corcoran, Television & Film
- Al Dempster, Animation
- Don Edgren, Imagineering
- Paul Frees, Television, Film & Parks
- Peter Jennings, Television
- Sir Elton John, Music
- Jimmy Johnson, Music
- Tommy Kirk, Television & Film
- Joe Ranft, Animation
- David Stollery, Television & Film
- Ginny Tyler, Television & Film

==== Class of 2007 ====
- Roone Arledge, Television
- Art Babbitt, Animation
- Carl Bongirno, Imagineering
- Marge Champion, Animation
- Dick Huemer, Animation
- Ron Logan, Parks & Resorts
- Lucille Martin, Administration
- Tom Murphy, Administration
- Randy Newman, Music
- Floyd Norman, Animation
- Bob Schiffer, Film Production
- Dave Smith, Archives

==== Class of 2008 ====
- Wayne Allwine, Animation—Voice
- Bob Booth, Attractions
- Neil Gallagher, Attractions
- Frank Gifford, Television
- Toshio Kagami, Parks and Resorts
- Burny Mattinson, Animation
- Walter Peregoy, Animation
- Dorothea Redmond, Designer
- Russi Taylor, Animation—Voice
- Barbara Walters, Television
- Oliver Wallace, Music

==== Class of 2009 ====
- Tony Anselmo, Animation—Voice
- Harry Archinal, Administration
- Beatrice Arthur, Film & Television
- Bill Farmer, Animation—Voice
- Estelle Getty, Film & Television
- Don Iwerks, Film
- Rue McClanahan, Film & Television
- Leota Toombs Thomas, Attractions
- Betty White, Film & Television
- Robin Williams, Film & Animation—Voice

=== 2010s ===
==== Class of 2011 ====
- Regis Philbin, Television
- Jim Henson, Film & Television
- Jodi Benson, Animation—Voice
- Paige O'Hara, Animation—Voice
- Lea Salonga, Animation—Voice
- Linda Larkin, Animation—Voice
- Anika Noni Rose, Animation—Voice
- Jack Wrather, Parks & Resorts
- Bonita Wrather, Film
- Guy Williams, Television
- Bo Boyd, Consumer Products
- Raymond Watson, Administration

==== Class of 2013 ====
- Tony Baxter, Imagineering
- Collin Campbell, Imagineering
- Dick Clark, Television
- Billy Crystal, Film & Animation—Voice
- John Goodman, Film & Animation—Voice
- Steve Jobs, Animation
- Glen Keane, Animation
- Ed Wynn, Film & Animation—Voice

==== Class of 2015 ====
- George Bodenheimer, Administration & Television
- Andreas Deja, Animation
- Johnny Depp, Film
- Eyvind Earle, Animation
- Danny Elfman, Music
- George Lucas, Film & Parks and Resorts
- Susan Lucci, Television
- Julie Reihm Casaletto, Parks and Resorts
- Carson Van Osten, Consumer Products

==== Class of 2017 ====
- Carrie Fisher, Film
- Clyde Geronimi, Animation
- Whoopi Goldberg, Film & Television
- Manuel Gonzales, Animation
- Mark Hamill, Film
- Wayne Jackson, Imagineering
- Jack Kirby, Publishing
- Stan Lee, Film & Publishing
- Garry Marshall, Film & Television
- Julie Taymor, Theatrical
- Oprah Winfrey, Film & Television

==== Class of 2019 ====
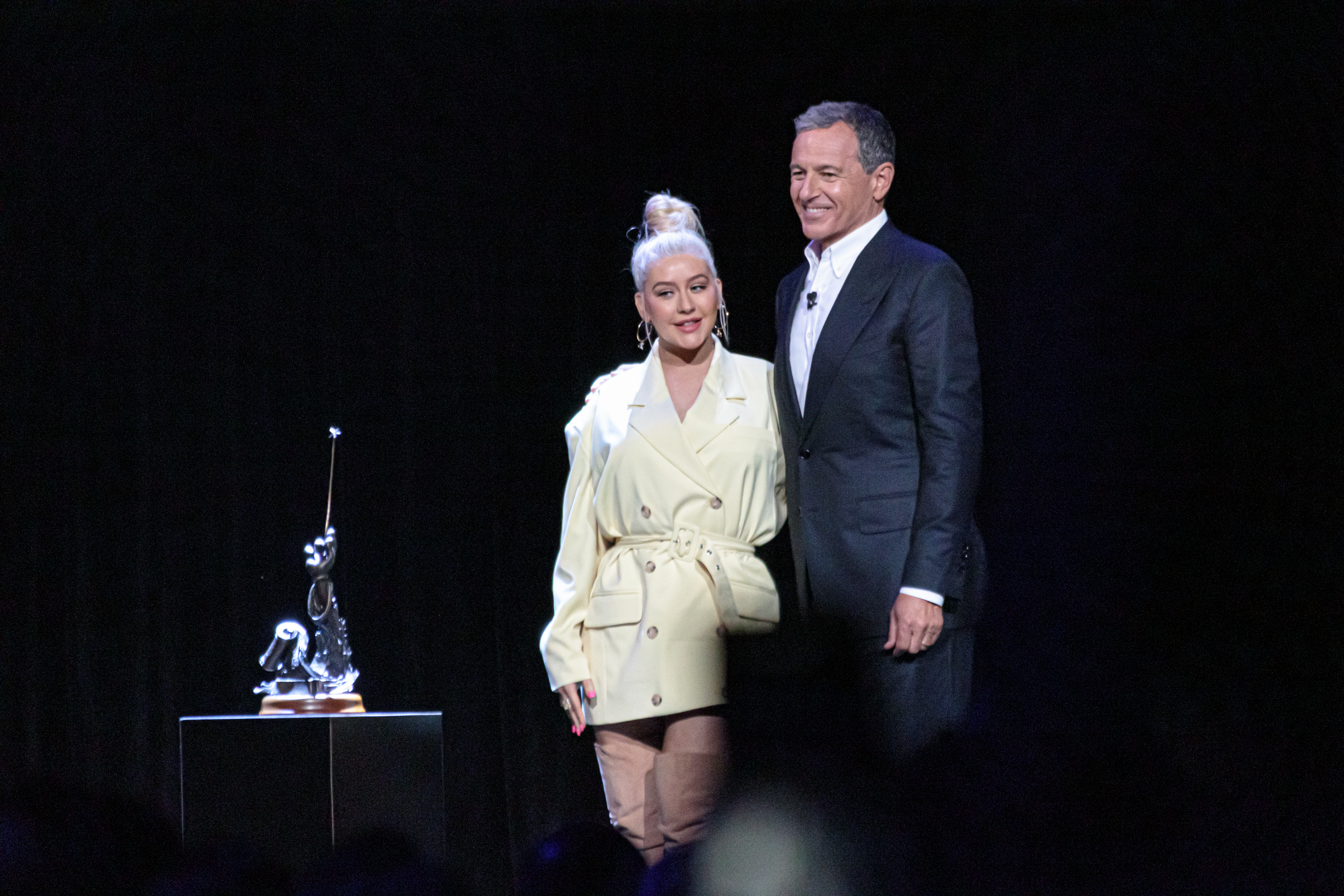
Christina Aguilera at the 2019 induction ceremony

- Christina Aguilera, Music & Television
- Wing T. Chao, Imagineering
- Robert Downey Jr., Film
- James Earl Jones, Film
- Jon Favreau, Film
- Bette Midler, Film
- Kenny Ortega, Film & Television
- Barnette Ricci, Parks & Resorts
- Robin Roberts, Television
- Diane Sawyer, Television
- Ming-Na Wen, Film, Television & Animation—Voice
- Hans Zimmer, Music

=== 2020s ===
==== Class of 2022 ====
Name	Category	Ref.
Anthony Anderson	Film & Television	
Kristen Bell	Film & Animation—Voice	
Chadwick Boseman	Film	
Rob't Coltrin	Parks & Resorts	
Patrick Dempsey	Film & Television	
Robert Price "Bob" Foster	Administration	
Josh Gad	Film & Animation—Voice	
Jonathan Groff	Film & Animation—Voice	
Don Hahn	Animation	
Doris Hardoon	Imagineering	
Idina Menzel	Film & Animation—Voice	
Chris Montan	Music	
Ellen Pompeo	Television	
Tracee Ellis Ross	Television	

==== Class of 2024 ====
This is the first time the ceremony was televised. It was broadcast on Disney+ and hosted by Ryan Seacrest.

Name	Category	Presented by
Colleen Atwood	Costume Design	Rob Marshall
Angela Bassett	Film & Television	Ryan Coogler
Martha Blanding	Parks & Resorts	Ryan Seacrest
James L. Brooks	Television	Danny Devito
James Cameron	Film	Zoe Saldana
Jamie Lee Curtis	Film	Jodie Foster & Lindsay Lohan
Miley Cyrus	Television & Music	Lainey Wilson
Steve Ditko	Publishing	Kevin Feige
Harrison Ford	Film	Bob Iger
Mark Henn	Animation	Jodi Benson, Paige O'Hara, Anika Noni Rose, Linda Lavin & Ming-Na Wen
Frank Oz	Film & Television	Pete Doctor
Kelly Ripa	Television	Ryan Seacrest
Joe Rohde	Imagineering	Jane Goodall
John Williams	Music	Kathleen Kennedy & Harrison Ford

==== Class of 2026 ====
The ceremony was broadcast on Disney+ on August 16, 2026. Ryan Seacrest returned as host.

Name	Category	Presented By
Chris Berman	Television	Steve Young
Jerry Bruckheimer	Film	Orlando Bloom
Susan Egan	Voice & Theater	Members of Katseye
Eric Goldberg	Animation	Jared Bush
Anne Hathaway	Film	David Frankel
Bob Iger	Administration	Josh D'Amaro
Kim Irvine	Imagineering	Ming-Na Wen
Dwayne Johnson	Film & Voice	Emily Blunt
Jonas Brothers	Television & Music	Vanessa Hudgens
Lin-Manuel Miranda	Film & Music	Auli'i Cravalho
Alan Tudyk	Film & Voice	Ginnifer Goodwin
