= Michael Peraza =

Cuban-American animator and art director (born 1955)

- Born: Michael Arthur Peraza Jr. November 15, 1955 (age 70); New Orleans, Louisiana, U.S.
- Education: California Institute of the Arts
- Known for: Animation & fine art
- Notable work: The Little Mermaid, Goof Troop, DuckTales, Anastasia
- Spouse: Patty Peraza
- Awards: Friz Freleng Lifetime Achievement Award, Disneyana Fan Club Legend Award, 2018
- Website: michaelperaza.blogspot.com

Michael Arthur Peraza Jr. (born November 15, 1955) is a Cuban-American animator, art director, conceptual artist and historian of animation, who has worked for The Walt Disney Company, Fox Feature Animation, and Warner Bros. As a Disney Master Artist, he speaks at special events as a panelist with his wife and fellow Disney Master Artist, Patty Peraza, about experiences in the entertainment field. He received the Friz Freleng Lifetime Achievement Award from the International Family Film Festival in 2014, and the Disneyana Fan Club Legend Award in 2018. Currently, he continues his work with Warner Bros and Disney Television Animation.

== Early life ==
Peraza was born in New Orleans, Louisiana. He became interested in Disney animation after watching Sleeping Beauty, Pinocchio and Walt Disney's Wonderful World of Color. As a young man, he experimented with various types of mediums and styles, getting the attention of local filmmakers. His first job was working for Max Goodman in local television station WKRG, where he learned how to work behind the camera, animated special effects and use paper cutouts for characters to create station breaks. After graduating high school, he continued his education at the California Institute of the Arts (CalArts), an art college that was established by Walt Disney.

Peraza was accepted at CalArts in 1973 before Disney had begun their Character Animation program. He later became one of the first people to join the program once it was started. His peers include the animators Tim Burton, John Lasseter and John Musker. Once an established student at CalArts, he studied under the guidance of Disney Legends including Jack Hannah (the Dean of the Disney program) and Ken O’Conner. As a teacher's assistant (TA), Peraza was given a full scholarship offered by the Disney Family, making it possible for him to continue his study.

== Animation ==
Directly after CalArts, Peraza accepted a full-time career in Walt Disney Feature Animation, where he worked alongside Disney's Nine Old Men, including Marc Davis, Ollie Johnston, Milt Kahl, Ward Kimball, Eric Larson, John Lounsbery, Wolfgang Reitherman and Frank Thomas. While working for Disney Features, he became known for his advanced integration of computer animation. and designing multiplane shots for The Fox and the Hound. Afterward, he went on to contribute to animated Disney films, including The Little Mermaid, The Great Mouse Detective, Beauty and the Beast, Mickey's Christmas Carol, Aladdin and Who Framed Roger Rabbit as well as visual development for live-action movies such as Watcher in the Woods, Tron and Return to Oz. When approached by Ken Anderson, Peraza helped start the new Disney Television Animation unit. There he started the CGI animation department while developing Disney afternoon shows, including DuckTales, Darkwing Duck and TaleSpin, as well as creating the character Max Goof, and the series Goof Troop, which were adapted for the animated films A Goofy Movie and An Extremely Goofy Movie. During the pre-production of DuckTales, Carl Barks called Peraza "the Fourth Duckman." After transferring to Disney Direct to Video, Peraza worked as art director and conceptual artist for the production of sequels, including Jungle Book 2, Tarzan 2 and Return to Never Land.

Peraza has also worked on projects for Miramax, Fox Features and Don Bluth Entertainment, where he worked as art director for Anastasia. The movie about the Russian princess was praised for the execution of advanced computer graphics of the time. During its premiere, Disney re-released The Little Mermaid in theaters, making Peraza one of few art directors who had two films out in theaters at the same time.

== Awards and recognition ==
- Friz Freleng Lifetime Achievement Award, 2014
- Disneyana Fan Club Legend Award, 2018

== See also ==
- The Walt Disney Company
