= Joyce Carlson =

American artist and designer

- Born: March 16, 1923; Racine, Wisconsin
- Died: January 2, 2008 (aged 84); Orlando, Florida
- Known for: Artist and graphic designer
- Notable work: It's a Small World
- Awards: Disney Legends

Joyce Carlson (March 16, 1923 – January 2, 2008) was an American artist and designer credited with creating the idyllic universe of singing children at "It's a Small World" rides at Walt Disney theme parks around the world. Carlson also worked as an ink artist in the Walt Disney Animation Studios, on such films as Cinderella, Peter Pan and Sleeping Beauty. She was the lead ink artist for the 1955 Disney film Lady and the Tramp. She spent 56 years working on Disney's animated films and theme park attractions.

== Early life ==
Joyce Carlson was born in Racine, Wisconsin on March 16, 1923. Her family moved to Southern California in 1938 when she was a teenager. Carlson graduated from Santa Monica High School in Santa Monica, California.

She initially did not want to become a designer. After high school, she took a job delivering pens, pencils, paints and brushes to animators at Walt Disney Studios in Burbank. She soon became an inker after that. When the inkers were replaced by Xerox, she moved into the imagineering group at Walt Disney.

== Career ==
Carlson first became involved with Walt Disney Productions in Burbank, California in 1944, when she took a job in the traffic department delivering mail, art supplies, coffee and other necessities to various departments. She later stated that she took the job at Disney simply because she needed the work.

Carlson created a pen-and-ink portfolio of her sketches several months after she began working at Disney, and presented it to her employers. She was hired into a position in the Disney studio's ink and paint department. This particular department was nicknamed "the nunnery" at the time because many of its employees were women who sometimes worked 16-hour days in order to finish Disney's feature films on time.

Her first work was on short, Disney-produced training films made for the United States Army during World War II. However, Carlson was soon promoted to feature films, which she worked on for 16 years. Her credits included The Three Caballeros, Cinderella, Peter Pan, and Sleeping Beauty. She was further promoted to lead ink artist during the production of the 1955 animated feature film Lady and the Tramp.

By 1960 the technology used in animation had changed, which meant that ink artists were no longer needed in the animation process. In 1962, Carlson joined WED Enterprises, named after Walt Elias Disney, to work on three dimensional characters in Walt Disney's theme parks. WED later became known as Walt Disney Imagineering. (The first Disney theme park, Disneyland, had opened in 1955). Her mentors in the imagineering group were Mary Blair and Marc Davis.

One of her earliest projects was the Carousel of Progress where she worked with Leota "Lee" Toombs, who was later the model for Madame Leota in The Haunted Mansion. For the show models, Toombs and Carlson were given chewing gum, wires, and earrings to make hinges for the refrigerator and various household appliances. Due to their lack of supplies, secretaries started to bring in bags of their old jewelry. Walt Disney used to show guests new developments in their projects and he'd say, "Do you believe that this whole set was built on earrings?" The Carousel of Progress debuted at the 1964 New York World's Fair as well as Carlson's next project, "It's a Small World".

Carlson helped to create the original models and designs for the "It's a Small World" attraction, which debuted at the 1964 New York World's Fair. She was one of a select group of artists and designers who were sent to New York City by Disney in order to create attractions for the World's Fair. Within the Disney Company, she became known as the artist who designed many of the famous ride's singing dolls. Following its debut at the World's Fair, "It's a Small World" opened first in Disneyland; Carlson later helped bring her signature attraction to Walt Disney World, Tokyo Disneyland, and Disneyland Paris .

Following her time working on projects for the World's Fair, Joyce Carlson worked on a team with Leota Toombs, Harriet Burns, and Glendra von Kessel to create many of the models and final pieces of attractions such as Walt Disney's Enchanted Tiki Room, Pirates of the Caribbean, Haunted Mansion, Country Bear Jamboree and many others. Additionally, she worked as a costume designer for raccoons, chickens, geese, dogs, etc. on a show called America Sings. The characters were later appropriated for scenes in Magic Kingdom's Splash Mountain attraction.

She continued to work on newer attractions at Disneyland, Disney World, Tokyo Disneyland and Disneyland Resort Paris. She was mentored by Disney's first generation of attractions designers, notably Grace Bailey, Mary Blair and John Hench.

In the later years of her career, Joyce moved to Florida in 1982, where she served as the resident “It's a Small World” expert (even developing new dolls for the attraction, including those representing Israel and Korea), helped maintain audio-animatronics figures and even helping Disney Legend John Hench select the color palette for the Park's iconic carousel horses. Additionally, she supervised the installation of The Haunted Mansion in the Walt Disney World's Magic Kingdom.

She became the first female Disney employee to reach the 50 and 55 years of employment milestone in 1994. She was working at Walt Disney World as a senior show production designer at the time.

Carlson officially retired from her full-time position at Disney in 2000, but remained at Disney World part-time until at least 2006 and continued to mentor Disney Imagineers through 2007.

She was declared a "Disney Legend" in 2000 and honored with a window on Main Street, U.S.A. at the Magic Kingdom in Walt Disney World. The commemorative window, which is Disney's version of a hall of fame, is a rare honor bestowed on employees who have made significant contributions to the company and its theme parks.

Carlson's window, which is on the second floor of a structure along Main Street U.S.A, reads, “Dolls by Miss Joyce. Dollmaker for the World. Shops in New York, California, Florida, Japan and Paris. Owner and Founder Joyce Carlson.” Another tribute was made in her honor when imagineers created a Joyce Carlson doll that is featured in the Florida attraction.

== Death ==
Joyce Carlson died of cancer at age 84 at her home in Orlando, Florida on January 2, 2008.
