= Grace Bailey =

American animator (1904–1983)

Grace Bailey Turner (January 1, 1904 – August 3, 1983) was the head of the Ink & Paint Department at Walt Disney Animation Studios from 1954 to 1972.

== Biography ==
Born Elizabeth Grace Randall in Willoughby, Ohio, Grace Bailey attended the Cleveland School of Art beginning in 1922. Early in her career, she worked on Max Fleischer's Out of the Inkwell series as an inker.

In 1930 Bailey moved to Southern California where she began making custom lampshades. In 1932, Bailey applied for a job at Walt Disney Animation Studios and subsequently became a member of the Ink & Paint Department, which was then led by Walt Disney's sister-in-law Hazel Sewell. Bailey began at Disney as an inker and eventually moved up to head of Paint.

Bailey began working with the studio when the films Disney made were still in black and white, and when the studio moved into color films with the Silly Symphonies, Bailey worked with Sewell, Walt Disney, and others to collaborate on approaches and palettes. Bailey developed colors to broaden the palette that Ink & Paint could work with, including a sky blue inspired by a dress worn by fellow Painter Betty Kimball. Bailey also developed methods for maintaining consistency of color, noting: "We have color charts that we match the paints back to and they have to be rematched every so often because they fade, just sitting on the shelves... So they must constantly be matched back to the original charts, the original colors."

When Disney transitioned back into normal production after World War II, Bailey advocated for "raising the top salary to attract more stable employees," saying: "By raising the maximum on a merit basis, those of outstanding ability would be paid for their contributions. There would be an incentive to excel and to work. It must be known to the girl that there is a future for those who are willing to make a career out of the work; that we are willing to pay for those who excel in both quality and quantity."

Beginning in 1954, until her retirement in 1972, Bailey was head of the Ink & Paint Department. She and other department heads regularly attended story meetings to "track story updates and decisions that pertained to Ink & Paint." Of the way she trained Inkers and Painters, Bailey remarked: "We used to say [it took] about a year for an Inker and about six months for a Painter. Inking is quite a skill the way we used to do it. Lines had to be tapered and you had to be exactly in the center of the pencil line. You couldn't wobble. Some of the girls couldn't smoke or drink coffee—it would make them shaky." Bailey felt that women were particularly well suited to ink and paint work, remarking in a 1958 book: “Inking and painting is precision work that requires neatness and patience. Women seem to have those qualities, plus a necessary feeling for their work.”

== Legacy and leadership ==
Former inker Merle Welton recalled that Bailey threatened to fire her from the department in 1953 for meeting with animators during her lunch break to show them her portfolio. Welton said she called Bailey "the Mother Superior because she ran the ink-and-paint department like a nunnery."

Former inker Marie Johnston said that Bailey "would come around to your desk and say, 'I want you to stop and just look out in the distance, look out the window.' Because it's bad for your eyes, to keep going with that light under [the light boxes]. So they cared about you."

Marge Hudson, who left and later returned to the studio after having children, noted that Bailey "was the one who hired me back," and said that when she asked Bailey "you think they'd rehire an old staggering mother with four kids?" that Bailey replied "Sure, we need help!"

Ginni Mack said of Bailey: "She had a way about her and she was really respected [with] a certain sort of fear. Grace could hire and fire, everybody knew that. She had this 'thing' you felt [and] you wanted to know if she was in the room, so you wouldn't misbehave." Mack, as well as Bailey's longtime assistant Edle Bakke, both recalled that there was a "password" among the women of the Ink & Paint Department to indicate to each other that Bailey was in the room.

Edle Bakke said of Bailey's management style: "She was extremely diplomatic and she tried not to hurt the girls' feelings when she knew she had to reprimand them—or fire them, if they were consistently late, [or] if they made too many errors on the cels, and such."

Bailey died in Florida in 1983. In 2000 she posthumously received a Disney Legends Award in recognition of her 40-year career with the Walt Disney Company.
