= Buddy Baker (composer) =

American composer (1918–2002)

- Born: Norman Dale Baker; January 4, 1918; Springfield, Missouri, U.S.
- Died: July 26, 2002 (aged 84) Hollywood, California
- Genre: Soundtrack
- Occupation: Composer
- Years active: 1934–2001

Norman Dale "Buddy" Baker (January 4, 1918 – July 26, 2002) was an American composer who scored many Disney films, including The Apple Dumpling Gang (1975), The Shaggy D.A. (1976), The Many Adventures of Winnie the Pooh (1977), The Apple Dumpling Gang Rides Again (1979), and The Fox and the Hound (1981). He also composed scores for Disney theme park attractions, including Great Moments with Mr. Lincoln and The Haunted Mansion.

== Biography ==
Baker was born and raised in Springfield, Missouri, and got his degree in music from Southwest Baptist College. He moved to the West Coast in the 1930s to arrange music scores for radio, and became the musical director for Bob Hope's radio show.

== Career ==
One of Baker's first hits as a big band arranger was "And Her Tears Flowed Like Wine" for the Stan Kenton Orchestra. He later became a professor at L.A. City College in the early 1950s. Among his early students were film composer Jerry Goldsmith and jazz drummer Louis Bellson, with whom he composed and arranged Journey Into Love (Norgran, 1954).

At about this time, his friend George Bruns asked him to compose music for the Disney television show Davy Crockett and the River Pirates. He stayed on at the Disney studio, and eventually became its music director, as well as chief composer for Disneyland and other Disney theme parks.

Baker was nominated for an Academy Award for his score for the 1972 film Napoleon and Samantha. His work is heard in many Disney cartoons and featurettes, including Donald in Mathmagic Land, which was nominated for a 1959 Academy Award (Best Documentary - Short Subjects). In 1978, he composed the music for the first Walt Disney Home Video logo, known as the "Neon Mickey" logo—a loud string and brass fanfare with a piano and timpani beats.

Baker arranged and conducted most of the Winnie-the-Pooh musical featurettes. He also conducted the music for The Many Adventures of Winnie the Pooh theme park attractions in 1999, at age 81.

The eerie music heard throughout The Haunted Mansion at Disneyland was another of Baker's works, as was the infectious theme to Walt Disney World's If You Had Wings. He arranged the medley of French classical music that accompanies the film Impressions de France at EPCOT Center, which artfully integrates works by Camille Saint-Saëns, Claude Debussy and Erik Satie, among others. He also wrote the music for the Tokyo DisneySea theme park attraction Journey to the Center of the Earth, which opened in 2001.

Baker was named a "Disney Legend" in 1989. He has an honorary Main Street window over the Car Barn at Disneyland Park, which reads: "Plaza School of Music - Sheet Music – B. Baker."

== Awards and honors ==
In 1998, Baker was inducted as a Disney Legend. Baker also received the honor of having his name appear on Main Street, U.S.A. windows at the Magic Kingdom. The window, which can be found above the Car Barn reads: Plaza School of Music - Sheet Music—-Baker.

== Later years and death ==
Baker retired from Disney as the last staff composer still on contract at any studio. Although he occasionally returned to work on theme park, film and television projects, he spent most of his later years teaching film scoring at the USC Thornton School of Music in Los Angeles, where he remained until his death from natural causes at age 84 in 2002. He was interred at Forest Lawn – Hollywood Hills Cemetery. In 2004, his wife Charlotte donated his papers to the Fales Library at New York University.

== Selected filmography ==
Year	Title	Director(s)	Studio(s)
1953	Wicked Woman	Russell Rouse	United Artists
1960	Toby Tyler	Charles Barton	Walt Disney Productions
1963	Summer Magic	James Neilson	Walt Disney Productions
1964	A Tiger Walks	Norman Tokar	Walt Disney Productions
1964	The Misadventures of Merlin Jones	Robert Stevenson	Walt Disney Productions
1965	The Monkey's Uncle	Robert Stevenson	Walt Disney Productions
1967	The Gnome-Mobile	Robert Stevenson	Walt Disney Productions
1969	Rascal	Norman Tokar	Walt Disney Productions
1969	Guns in the Heather	Robert Butler	Walt Disney Productions
1970	King of the Grizzlies	Ron Kelly	Walt Disney Productions
1971	The Million Dollar Duck	Vincent McEveety	Walt Disney Productions
1972	Napoleon and Samantha	Bernard McEveety	Walt Disney Productions
1972	Run, Cougar, Run	Jerome Courtland	Walt Disney Productions
1973	Charley and the Angel	Vincent McEveety	Walt Disney Productions
1973	Superdad	Vincent McEveety	Walt Disney Productions
1974	The Bears and I	Bernard McEveety	Walt Disney Productions
1975	The Apple Dumpling Gang	Norman Tokar	Walt Disney Productions
1976	No Deposit, No Return	Norman Tokar	Walt Disney Productions
1976	Treasure of Matecumbe	Vincent McEveety	Walt Disney Productions
1976	The Shaggy D.A.	Robert Stevenson	Walt Disney Productions
1977	The Many Adventures of Winnie the Pooh	Wolfgang Reitherman; John Lounsbery	Walt Disney Productions
1977	A Tale of Two Critters	Jack Spears	Walt Disney Productions
1978	Hot Lead and Cold Feet	Robert Butler	Walt Disney Productions
1979	The Apple Dumpling Gang Rides Again	Vincent McEveety	Walt Disney Productions
1981	The Devil and Max Devlin	Steven Hilliard Stern	Walt Disney Productions
1981	The Fox and the Hound	Ted Berman; Richard Rich; Art Stevens	Walt Disney Productions
1987	The Puppetoon Movie	Arnold Leibovit	Arnold Leibovit Entertainment
