= Bob Broughton =

American camera operator (1917–2009)

- Born: Robert Carey Broughton; September 17, 1917; Berkeley, California, U.S.
- Died: January 19, 2009 (aged 91); Rochester, Minnesota, U.S.
- Occupation: Camera operator

Robert Carey Broughton (September 17, 1917 – January 19, 2009) was an American film camera operator known for his work with Walt Disney Pictures, where he was responsible for several innovations in visual effects technology.

== Biography ==
=== Early life ===
Broughton attended Glendale High School, and then studied chemistry, math, optics, and physics, at the University of California, Los Angeles, and graduated with a B. A. in 1937. He subsequently began dating a woman who worked as secretary for Disney's manager of production Herb Lamb; one evening, when Broughton visited her at Walt Disney Animation Studios, she was not immediately available, because production work on Snow White and the Seven Dwarfs was running long. While Broughton was waiting for her in Lamb's office, Larry Lansburgh came in and, thinking that Broughton was a friend of Lamb's, offered him a job in the studio's "traffic department"; Fred Joerger subsequently referred to Broughton as a "courier".

=== Career ===
Broughton's first production-related job was as an assistant with the test camera for Snow White; next, he was assigned to be one of only two operators for the studio's multiplane camera. His work on Fantasia led to him being named Supervisor of Special Photographic Effects.

During the Second World War, Broughton joined the United States Army, and was assigned to the Office of Strategic Services, where he worked in the Field Photographic Branch under John Ford; in this position, he participated in the production of training films and documentaries, including the Academy Award-winning The Battle of Midway.

Broughton's credited effects include the giant squid in 20,000 Leagues Under the Sea (1954), the appearance of Hayley Mills as two people at once in The Parent Trap (1961), and the conjunction of live action and animation in Mary Poppins (1964), where he worked as an assistant to Ub Iwerks. He also filmed the host segments for Walt Disney's Wonderful World of Color.

The last Disney movie to which Broughton contributed was The Black Hole. In 2001, Broughton was named a Disney Legend.

=== Personal life and death ===
Broughton married June Chestnut in 1940, and with her had two sons: Dan and Tim. Dan Broughton was a physician working at the Mayo Clinic, whose education and training Walt Disney had paid for.

After retiring in either 1982 or 1983, Broughton retired to the Motion Picture & Television Fund's retirement community in Woodland Hills, California. In July 2008, Broughton moved to Rochester, Minnesota, where he died from pneumonia on January 19, 2009.
