= Matsuo Yokoyama =

Japanese businessman

Matsuo Yokoyama (横山 松夫, Yokoyama Matsuo; born 31 March 1927) is a Japanese businessman who was the president of Walt Disney Enterprises of Japan from 1989 to 1994. As a merchandise representative in the early 1960s he was responsible for establishing the enforcement of Disney's intellectual property rights in Japan.

== Early life and career ==
Yokoyama was born on 31 March 1927 in Tokyo, Japan to a chef and restaurateur. At the age of 17, he entered a boy's military school until August 1945 after Japan had surrendered to the Allies during World War II. After that, he worked in an iron factory while studying English at a local YMCA. In 1951, he enrolled in the University of Keio studying business management and graduated in 1955. After graduating, he joined Morinaga Confectionery Company as the marketing manager.

In 1961, Yokoyama was selected to join Disney as a merchandise representative. With the prominence of fraudulent Disney character merchandising and advertising, Yokoyama created the Disney Licensing Association. In 1989, Yokoyama was promoted to become the president of Walt Disney Enterprises of Japan. Yokoyama retired in September 1994.
