= Ruthie Tompson =

American animator (1910–2021)

- Born: Ruth Irene Tompson; July 22, 1910; Portland, Maine, U.S.
- Died: October 10, 2021 (aged 111 years, 80 days); Woodland Hills, California, U.S.
- Occupations: Camera technician; animation checker
- Years active: Between 1923 and 1927–1978
- Known for: The Walt Disney Company
- Notable work: Snow White and the Seven Dwarfs; Pinocchio; Dumbo; Fantasia; Sleeping Beauty; The Lord of the Rings
- Awards: Disney Legend, 2000

Ruth Irene Tompson (July 22, 1910 – October 10, 2021) was an American camera technician, animation checker and supercentenarian. She was known for her work on animated features at The Walt Disney Company and was declared a Disney Legend in 2000.

== Biography ==
Ruth Irene Tompson was born on July 22, 1910, in Portland, Maine, and raised in Boston, Massachusetts. She then moved with her family to Oakland, California, in November 1918 at age eight. She experienced the 1918 influenza pandemic near the end of World War I. In 1924, her parents divorced and her mother, Arlene, remarried artist John Roberts. The family relocated to Los Angeles and their house was in the same block as the house of Robert Disney, uncle of Walt Disney. This is where Roy and Walt Disney lived when they first came to Los Angeles.

As she stated in an interview, Tompson first met the Disneys when she visited her neighbor Robert's new baby. She recalls sitting on an apple box until her parents said they were going home for dinner. The location of The Walt Disney Company, then known as the Disney Brothers Cartoon Studio, was not far from her home – she passed it on her way to grammar school. She was invited into the office after many times standing outside and watching them work through the window. She visited the office often and ended up appearing in the Alice Comedies.

At the age of 18, Tompson started working at Dubrock's Riding Academy, where Roy and Walt Disney often played polo. Walt Disney remembered Tompson from when she was young and offered her a job as an inker. After training as an inker, Tompson was transferred to the Paint Department, where she helped with Disney's Snow White and the Seven Dwarfs. After working on several other Disney films, Tompson was promoted to final checker position where she reviewed animation cels before they were photographed onto film. Tompson continued working for Disney and was promoted to animation checker during WWII, where she worked on training and education films, for the U.S Armed Forces, starring Disney characters such as Mickey, Donald Duck and Goofy. By 1948, Tompson was working in the camera department, developing camera moves and mechanics to shoot animation. She became one of the first three women admitted into the International Photographers Union, Local 659 of the IATSE. Tompson continued to work through the studio ranks, eventually becoming the supervisor of the screen planning department.

Tompson retired in 1975 after working for The Walt Disney Company for almost 40 years. In retirement, she worked for an in-house television channel at the Motion Picture & Television Fund (MPTF) Country House where she lived. Tompson was the oldest member of Women in Animation. In 2000, Tompson was honored by the Disney Legends program and received the Disney Legends Award for her work at the Walt Disney Studios. In 2017, Tompson was honored by the Academy of Motion Picture Arts & Sciences for her contributions to the animation industry. In July 2020, Tompson became a supercentenarian, and celebrities including Whoopi Goldberg wished her a happy birthday.

Tompson died in her sleep at her home in the Woodland Hills neighborhood of Los Angeles, California, on October 10, 2021, at the age of 111 years, 80 days. At the time of her death she was the last known living person to have been involved in any capacity with the making of the first four Disney films: Snow White and the Seven Dwarfs, Pinocchio, Fantasia and Dumbo.

== Filmography ==
- Lonesome Ghosts (1937) (ink and paint – uncredited)
- Snow White and the Seven Dwarfs (ink and paint – uncredited) (1937)
- Pinocchio (1940)
- Fantasia (1940)
- Dumbo (1941)
- Donald in Mathmagic Land (scene planner – uncredited) (1959)
- Sleeping Beauty (checker and scene planner – uncredited) (1959)
- Popeye the Sailor (1960–62)
- Mary Poppins (scene planner – uncredited) (1964)
- The Aristocats (scene planner – uncredited) (1970)
- Robin Hood (scene planning supervisor – uncredited) (1973)
- Winnie the Pooh and Tigger Too (short; 1974)
- The Rescuers (1977)
- The Lord of the Rings (1978)
- Metamorphoses (1978)
- The Hand Behind the Mouse: The Ub Iwerks Story (Documentary) (special thanks – as Ruthie Tompson) (1999)
- American Experience (TV Series documentary) (self) (2015)
- 110-Year-Old Ruthie Tompson Tells Us About Making Snow White – NOT-SO SMALL WORLD (Web episode) (self; as Ruthie Tompson) (2020)
