= Marc Davis (animator) =

American artist and animator (1913–2000)

- Born: March 30, 1913; Bakersfield, California, U.S.
- Died: January 12, 2000 (aged 86); Glendale, California, U.S.
- Education: Kansas City Art Institute
- Occupations: Artist; animator
- Years active: 1937–1978
- Known for: One of Disney's Nine Old Men
- Spouse: Alice Estes Davis (m. 1956)
- Awards: Winsor McCay Award (1982); Disney Legend (1989)

Marc Fraser Davis (March 30, 1913 – January 12, 2000) was an American artist and animator who was one of Disney's Nine Old Men, the core animators of Disney animated films. After his work on One Hundred and One Dalmatians he moved to Walt Disney Imagineering to work on rides for Disneyland and Walt Disney World before retiring in 1978.

Walt Disney once said of Davis, "Marc can do story, he can do character, he can animate, he can design shows for me. All I have to do is tell him what I want and it's there! He's my Renaissance man."

== Early life ==
Davis was born in Bakersfield, California, on March 30, 1913. The family moved frequently, so Davis attended 26 schools before high school. As a child, schoolyard bullies were an impetus for Davis to start drawing. He found when he drew that the other kids wanted his art, and the bullies wouldn't beat him up. Davis studied at the Kansas City Art Institute, the California School of Fine Arts in San Francisco, and the Otis Art Institute in Los Angeles. As a student, he spent his days sketching zoo animals; in the evening, he studied animal anatomy at the public library.

== Disney animator ==
Marc Davis began his Disney career in 1935 as an animator on Snow White and the Seven Dwarfs and was responsible for many Disney characters, becoming so well regarded for his work on female characters that he was called "ladies' man".

=== Introduction ===
As one of Walt Disney's "Nine Old Men," Marc Davis was able to set himself apart from the distinguished group of veteran animators. His mastery of drawing and painting led him to champion animation, followed by three-dimensional characters and storytelling. “I haven't used Marc as I should," Disney once admitted to Alice Davis: "I have a whole building over there filled with animators and that's all they can do. Marc can do story, he can do character, he can animate, he can design shows for me. All I have to do is tell him what I want and it's there. He's my Renaissance Man." An even higher compliment from Disney circled back to Davis over the years. When asked what piece of the Studio's animation he fancied most, Disney replied, "I guess it would have to be where Cinderella gets her ballroom gown." It was Davis who animated Cinderella during her transformation, with George Rowley animating the pixie dust itself.

=== Disney's Ladies' Man ===
Despite his skill with animal anatomy and caricature, Davis and Milt Kahl were stuck with over a decade of "difficult-to-draw" and "dull" human characters. In Davis's own words, "Milt got stuck with the prince a lot and I got stuck with the girls." Despite his distaste for this role, his commitment to artistic excellence never let him forget that he "still had to put personality into the characters. You had to believe the characters were alive, give a performance like an actor, and make them come alive for the audience." Davis follows through on this commitment, as seen through his involved work with reference images, voice actors, and live actors. Davis became a master of observing and capturing life, "evident in his acting, posing, and movement."

Voice actors for Maleficent, Briar Rose, and Cruella De Vil have all discussed the influence on Davis's animation of their respective characters. Mary Costa, the voice of Briar Rose, recalled not even being invited to the premier of Sleeping Beauty because, at the time, the voice acting was hardly recognized. Even though Hollywood did not acknowledge voice acting's importance, Davis did. In an interview Costa described working with Davis at Disney: "Marc would sit in the sound booth and sketch my every gesture and expression." He recalled how despite hiring Helene Stanley as the live-action reference for Briar Rose, it was her "mannerisms" that made it to the big screen. When her mother saw the film, she exclaimed: "Oh Mary, she looks just like you!" Eleanor Audley, voice of Maleficent, remembered Davis telling her that "the voice is the most necessary thing in the world." In the end, Davis admitted that Maleficent "looked a lot like Eleanor." When it came to Cruella, one of the only characters to ever be completely controlled by a single animator, Davis claimed his greatest inspiration was the vocal performance of Betty Lou Gerson. Gerson commented in an interview how Davis incorporated her high cheekbones into Cruella's face and how closely she had to work with him to perfect "the laugh."

Live-action references also influenced Davis's work, though his distinct style still shone through, unlike many animators who just regurgitated reality. Davis's most famous scene from Sleeping Beauty is when Briar Rose spins around with her arms out in the forest. Though he followed the live-action reference footage, "Davis exaggerated the foreshortening and sweeping arcs of the arms," making an artistic choice, rather than one from reality, that made the princess look "more appealing." Fellow animator Frank Thomas criticized Davis for going "overboard" with Cruella De Vil, making the villain's face more "of a skull." However, Davis's skill in capturing personality made it so "her key poses and facial angles" retained a "certain glamor." Another example of this talent is how Davis perfectly captured and articulated Tinker Bell's notorious sass and personality through pantomime and facial expression alone. Margaret Kerry, the live-action reference for the fairy, remembered asking Davis for guidance on who he wanted Tinker Bell to be and getting a response that she described as "wonderful." Davis told her he wanted "her to be you!" Davis had vision for the characters he animated beyond just what they looked like, he knew how they would behave, sound, move, and what they would wear. A clear example of Davis's forethought is with Briar Rose's dress. Davis instructed his wife, Alice, on how he wanted the princess's dress to flow so she could make the correct costume for when the live-action model arrived.

Davis's contribution to Disney animation is undeniable. When asked how he would like to be remembered, he responded, "Well, I think as a really decent person and a pretty damn good artist."

Significant characters he designed and animated are :

- Snow White from Snow White and the Seven Dwarfs (1937)
- Bambi, Thumper, And Flower, from Bambi (1942)
- Br'er Rabbit, Br'er Fox and Br'er Bear from Song of the South (1946)
- Bongo, butterfly, and yawning trees from Fun and Fancy Free (1947)
- Mr. Toad, Cyril Proudbottom, Rat, Mole, Angus MacBadger, Mr. Winkie and the weasels from The Adventures of Ichabod and Mr. Toad (1949)
- Cinderella, Stepsisters (tearing Cinderella's dress apart), Prince Charming, the King (close up of hands and bookends) and the Grand Duke (close up of hands and bookends) from Cinderella (1950)
- Alice and the eyeglasses creature from Alice in Wonderland (1951)
- Tinker Bell and Mrs. Darling from Peter Pan (1953)
- Aurora, Maleficent and Diablo the Raven from Sleeping Beauty (1959)
- Cruella de Vil and Anita from 101 Dalmatians (1961)

== WED Enterprises (Imagineering) ==
Davis, a brilliant draftsman, also designed the characters for many Disneyland rides and show animatronics:

- The Jungle Cruise (1955)
- Mine Train Through Nature's Wonderland (1960)
- The Enchanted Tiki Room (1963)
- Ford's Magic Skyway (1964)
- Great Moments with Mr. Lincoln (1964)
- The Carousel of Progress (1964)
- It's a Small World (1964)
- Pirates of the Caribbean (1967)
- The Haunted Mansion (1969)
- The Country Bear Jamboree (1971)
- America Sings (1974)
- World of Motion (1982)
- Western River Expedition (never built)

== Personal life ==
As a professor at the Chouinard Art Institute, Davis first met Alice Estes as a student there in 1947. After her graduation, they married in June 1956, and remained married for 44 years until his death in 2000.

== Awards and honors ==
In 1982, Davis was the recipient of the Winsor McCay Award. In 1985, Davis was the recipient of the Golden Award for 50 years of service from the Motion Picture Screen Cartoonists. In 1989, he was inducted as a Disney Legend. In 1993, Davis was the recipient of the DFC Disney Legend Award given by the Disneyana Fan Club. He was also the recipient of the much-coveted Mousecar (the Disney equivalent of an Oscar). Davis, along with his wife Alice, received the honor of having their names on side-by-side windows on Main Street, U.S.A. at Disneyland. Marc's reads: “Far East Imports – Exotic Art – Marc Davis – Proprietor”.

== Legacy ==
Starting in 1994, The Academy of Motion Picture Arts and Sciences has annually presented the Marc Davis Lecture on Animation series featuring noted creators and luminaries in the industry.

Davis died on January 12, 2000. That month, the Marc Fraser Davis Scholarship Fund was formally established at the California Institute of the Arts.

In 2014, the Walt Disney Family Museum presented the exhibition Leading Ladies and Femmes Fatales: The Art of Marc Davis.

In October 2014, Marc Davis: Walt Disney's Renaissance Man ISBN 978-1423184188, a hardcover book on Davis' art and career, was published by Disney Editions. It was followed by the September 2020 release of Marc Davis in His Own Words: Imagineering the Disney Parks ISBN 978-1484755754, a two-volume hardcover set covering his work at WED.

== Filmography ==
=== Films ===
| Year | Title | Credits | Characters | Notes |
|---|---|---|---|---|
| 1937 | Snow White and the Seven Dwarfs | Assistant Animator | Snow White | uncredited |
| 1938 | Ferdinand the Bull (short) | Assistant Animator | | uncredited |
| 1942 | Bambi | Animator | Bambi, Thumper, and Flower | Credited as Fraser Davis |
| 1942 | How to Play Baseball (short) | Animator | | uncredited |
| 1943 | Victory Through Air Power (documentary) | Character Designer | | uncredited |
| 1945 | African Diary (Short) | Animator | | |
| 1946 | Song of the South | Directing Animator | Brer Rabbit, Brer Fox, and Brer Bear | |
| 1947 | Fun and Fancy Free | Character Animator | Bongo, butterfly, and yawning trees | |
| 1949 | The Adventures of Ichabod and Mr. Toad | Character Animator | Mr. Toad, Cyril Proudbottom, Rat, Mole, Angus MacBadger, Mr. Winkie, and the weasels (The Wind in the Willows) | |
| 1950 | Cinderella | Directing Animator | Cinderella, Stepsisters (tearing Cinderella's dress apart), Prince Charming, the King (close up of hands and bookends), and the Grand Duke (close up of hands and bookends) | |
| 1951 | Alice in Wonderland | Directing Animator | Alice and the eyeglasses creature | |
| 1952 | The Little House (Short) | Animator | | |
| 1953 | Peter Pan | Directing Animator | Tinker Bell | |
| 1953 | Melody (Short) | Animator | | |
| 1953 | Toot Whistle Plunk and Boom (Short) | Animator | | |
| 1959 | Sleeping Beauty | Directing Animator | Aurora, Maleficent and Diablo the Raven | |
| 1961 | One Hundred and One Dalmatians | Directing Animator | Cruella de Vil | |

=== TV series ===
| Year | Title | Credits | Characters | Notes |
|---|---|---|---|---|
| 1955–59 | Disneyland | Animator | | 4 episodes |
