= Harriet Burns =

American artist and designer

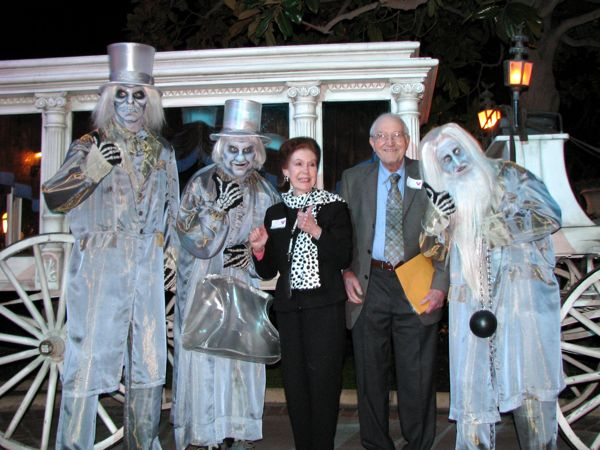
- Harriet Burns, Blaine Gibson, and The Haunted Mansion ghosts in 2008
- Born: Harriet Tapp; August 20, 1928; San Antonio, Texas
- Died: July 25, 2008 (aged 79); Los Angeles, California
- Occupations: Scenic designer, model maker
- Spouse: William Burns
- Children: 1

Harriet Burns (August 20, 1928 – July 25, 2008) was an American artist and designer. Burns was the first woman hired in the Walt Disney Imagineering department within the Walt Disney Company.

== Biography ==
=== Early life ===
Burns was born Harriet Tapp in San Antonio, Texas, on August 20, 1928, and raised in Seguin, Texas. She earned her bachelor's degree from Southern Methodist University in Dallas and studied advanced design at the University of New Mexico.

Harriet Tapp married William Burns, and the couple moved to Los Angeles with their infant daughter in 1953. William Burns died in 1986.

=== Walt Disney Imagineering ===
Burns's first job in Los Angeles was at Dice Display Industries Cooperative Exchange. She designed props and sets for television shows, including the Colgate Comedy Hour, as well as interiors and sets for floor shows and hotels in Las Vegas, including The Dunes. She also worked at a tourist attraction theme park in Lake Arrowhead, California, called Santa's Village during the mid-1950s. When the attraction closed, a friend advised Burns to apply for open positions at Disney.

Burns began working at Disney Studios in 1955 as a prop and set painter for the Mickey Mouse Club. She helped to design and build the famed Mouse Clubhouse which was a featured fixture on the show. Her appearance caused her to stand out on the set, as she dressed in high heels and a skirt to work with the hardware and tools, such as the drill press and sanders.

Burns shared a workstation at the Disney Studio with a fellow Disney employee named Fred Joerger. Joerger was a model builder for WED Enterprises, which is now known as Walt Disney Imagineering. He was working on prototype models for the future Disneyland theme park. In addition to her job as a set builder, Burns began working with Joerger in Disney's model shop building miniature prototypes of Disneyland buildings and attractions. WED Enterprises originally consisted of just three members — Harriet Burns, Fred Joerger and Wathel Rogers — and became known as the WED Model Shop. WED Enterprises was eventually renamed to Walt Disney Imagineering, which alluded to the engineering and imagination needed to design Disney theme park attractions.

Burns contributed greatly to the development of Disneyland at WED Enterprises by creating both miniature models and actual theme park attractions. One of Burns's first assignments was to craft a model of Sleeping Beauty Castle, a Disneyland landmark which opened with the theme park on July 17, 1955. She continued to work on Disneyland expansions after the park's grand opening. Burns designed models of the Matterhorn Bobsleds attraction as a 1/100 scale replica of the famous Matterhorn in Switzerland.

Another of Burns's job at Disneyland was what is called "figure-finishing." Figure-finishing involves applying paint and other finishes to Disneyland attractions and mannequins to create a "finished" look. Burns personally designed and painted the set pieces and underwater figurines for the Submarine Voyage ride. She applied individual feathers to the animatronic birds in Walt Disney's Enchanted Tiki Room, which opened in 1963. Burns later confessed in a 2005 interview with The Hollywood Reporter that the Tiki Room birds were one of her most challenging projects ever. "When they breathed out, it would be fine, but when they came back they scrunched. They looked like they had mites." She managed to fix the look of the birds and actively maintained the Tiki Room attraction after its opening. Similarly, she created the birds for the film, Mary Poppins.

Burns also helped with the models and final designs of New Orleans Square, one of the themed lands at Disneyland. She also designed the attractions within New Orleans Square. She built an exact model of the entire Pirates of the Caribbean dark ride, which opened in 1967, and was also a figure finisher on the pirates mannequins. She similarly designed The Haunted Mansion, which opened to the public in 1969.

Outside of Disneyland, Burns was part of a team of Disney employees, which included Joyce Carlson, which created several Disney attractions for the 1964 New York World's Fair. Burns contributions to the World's Fair including designing Great Moments with Mr. Lincoln, which later opened at Disneyland, and the Carousel of Progress.

Her work earned the attention of Walt Disney. He featured Burns on several episodes of The Wonderful World of Color, a 1960s television show which gave a behind-the-scenes look at the Walt Disney Company, including its theme parks.

Burns retired from Walt Disney Imagineering in 1986. She was honored in 1992 with a window display of her work on Main Street, U.S.A. in Disneyland with a commemorative plaque that reads, "The Artisans Loft, Handmade Miniatures by Harriet Burns." She was the first woman in Disney history to receive this honor. Burns was also designated a Disney Legend by the Walt Disney Company in 2000, as an employee "whose imagination, talents and dreams have created the Disney magic."

=== Death ===
Harriet Burns died of complications from a heart condition at USC University Hospital in Los Angeles on July 25, 2008, at the age of 79. Burns was survived by her daughter, Pam Burns-Clair; two sisters, Wilma Draves and Suzie Mosteller; two granddaughters, Chelsea and Haley Clair; and many extended family members. She was a resident of Santa Barbara, California where she had been active in the arts and music community.
