= Alice Estes Davis =

American costume designer (1929–2022)

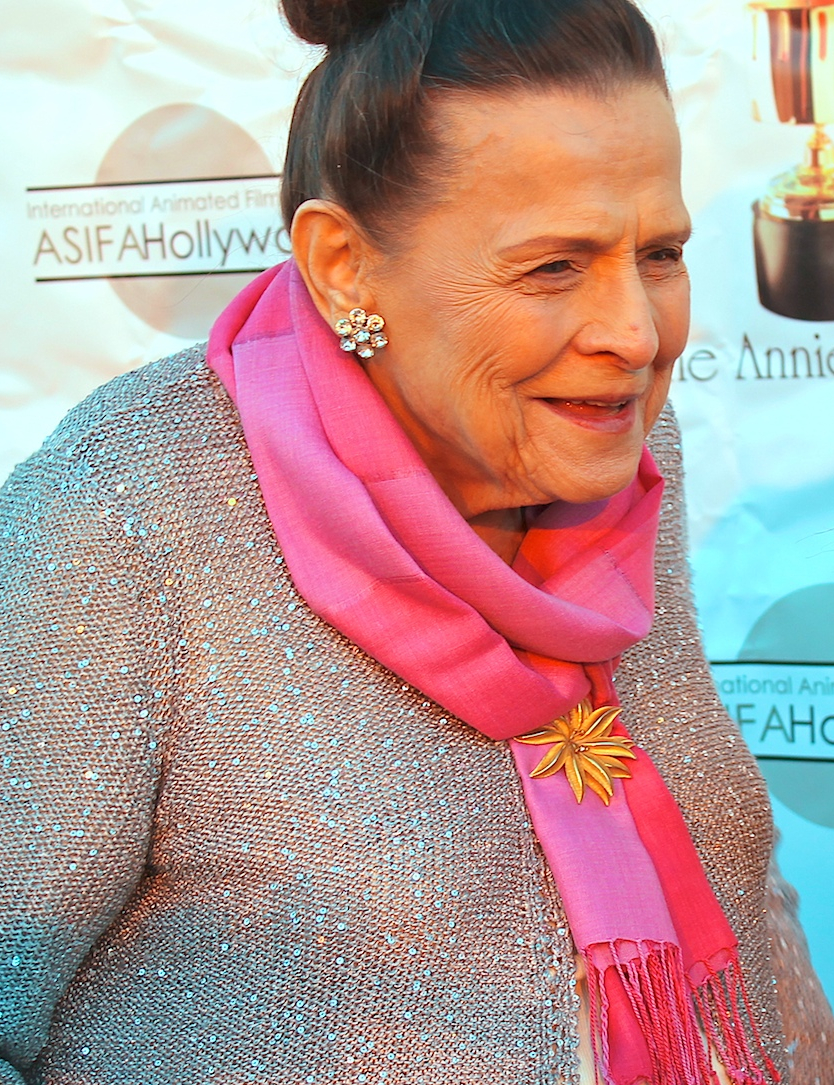
- Davis at the 2014 Annie Awards
- Born: Alice Estes; March 26, 1929; Escalon, California, U.S.
- Died: November 3, 2022 (aged 93); Los Feliz, California, U.S.
- Occupation: Costume designer
- Spouse: Marc Davis (m. 1956; died 2000)
- Awards: Disney Legends, 2004; June Foray Award, 2014

Alice Estes Davis (March 26, 1929 – November 3, 2022) was an American costume designer. She is most famous for her work with Walt Disney, who employed her to develop costumes for films, television, and theme parks. She was married to Marc Davis, a Disney animator and Imagineer. Alice was named a Disney Legend in 2004.

Davis died on November 3, 2022, at the age of 93.

== Early life and career ==
Alice Davis was born Alice Estes in Escalon, California. She was a talented artist in high school and received a scholarship from the Long Beach Art Association to study at the prestigious Chouinard Art Institute. She wanted to study animation at Chouinard Art Institute but due to the timing (World War II ending and the GI bill), there was a two-year waiting list to enter that field of study. So Chouinard, herself, got her in the school in the only opening they had for the next semester and that was in costume design.

She met Marc Davis, her future husband and fellow Disney Legend, while he was teaching a night class in animation. Though the class was full, Chouinard told her that she could attend the class if she "called the roll" and brought the chalk to class. They did not start dating at this time but they did develop a respect for one another.

After graduation, Alice began her career designing women's lingerie for the Beverly Vogue & Lingerie House in Los Angeles. Because of her skill, she quickly rose through the ranks to head designer. She designed two lines of fashion lingerie herself. Alice earned a reputation within the fashion community for her pattern-making skills and her expertise with different types of exotic fabrics.

== Early Disney efforts ==
In the mid-1950s, she received a call from Marc Davis. He needed a costume for dancer Helene Stanley to wear as she performed live-action reference footage for the animation of Princess Aurora in Sleeping Beauty; Marc wanted to see how the skirt flowed and bunched as Stanley moved about in order to draft accurate animation. During this project, she and Marc Davis grew closer and eventually married in June 1956.

Walt Disney saw the two newlyweds at a Los Angeles restaurant one night and immediately took a liking to her and her work. Walt Disney hired her as a costume designer for the 1960 Disney feature Toby Tyler. She also aided in the design of costumes for various other Disney television shows.

== Imagineering ==
In 1963, Walt Disney came to Alice Davis with an assignment to assist artist Mary Blair in designing the costumes for the Audio-Animatronic (AA) children of Disney's 1964/1965 New York World's Fair attraction "it's a small world". She researched the different cultures and regions being represented and translated the attire customs into over 150 different costumes. Her other work for the Fair included the period-specific costumes for the General Electric Carousel of Progress.

During the "small world" project, she established an AA figure costume manufacturing area, quality control system, and refurbishing techniques at WED Enterprises in Glendale, California. These systems and techniques are still used today by Imagineers and maintenance staff at the Disney theme parks worldwide.

In 1965, she said that [she] "went from sweet little children, to dirty old men overnight". Walt Disney assigned her to create the costumes for the AA characters that would inhabit the Pirates of the Caribbean attraction. She created 47 different costumes – each one period-specific to the 17th and 18th centuries, but still had a "Disney flair" to them. Walt Disney visited her in the studio and was able to see The Auctioneer pirate in full attire. Then, the following day or two, he went into the hospital before dying. He never got to see any of the other pirates. Pirates of the Caribbean opened in 1967, and remains a Disney theme park favorite to this day. She also designed the costumes for the Mission Control AA figures in the revamped Flight to the Moon attraction the same year as Pirates.

Following Marc Davis' lead, she retired from WED in 1978, but still consulted on various projects for The Walt Disney Company, such as Pixar's Up (2009). In order to solve a central question of that film, "What are the most important things in life? – the Up filmmaking team turned to their oldest acquaintances and relatives, mining their memories for stories. The influences included the legendary Disney animator Joe Grant (who died in 2005). She also made appearances at Disney-related events and fan meet-and-greets.

Her marriage to Marc Davis ended with his death in 2000.

== Awards and honors ==
In 1997, Davis received the Disneyana Fan Club Disney Legend award.

In 2004, in a ceremony at the Walt Disney Studios in Burbank, California, Davis was inducted as a Disney Legend.

On May 10, 2012, she was honored with a window on Main Street, U.S.A. at Disneyland next to her husband's window.

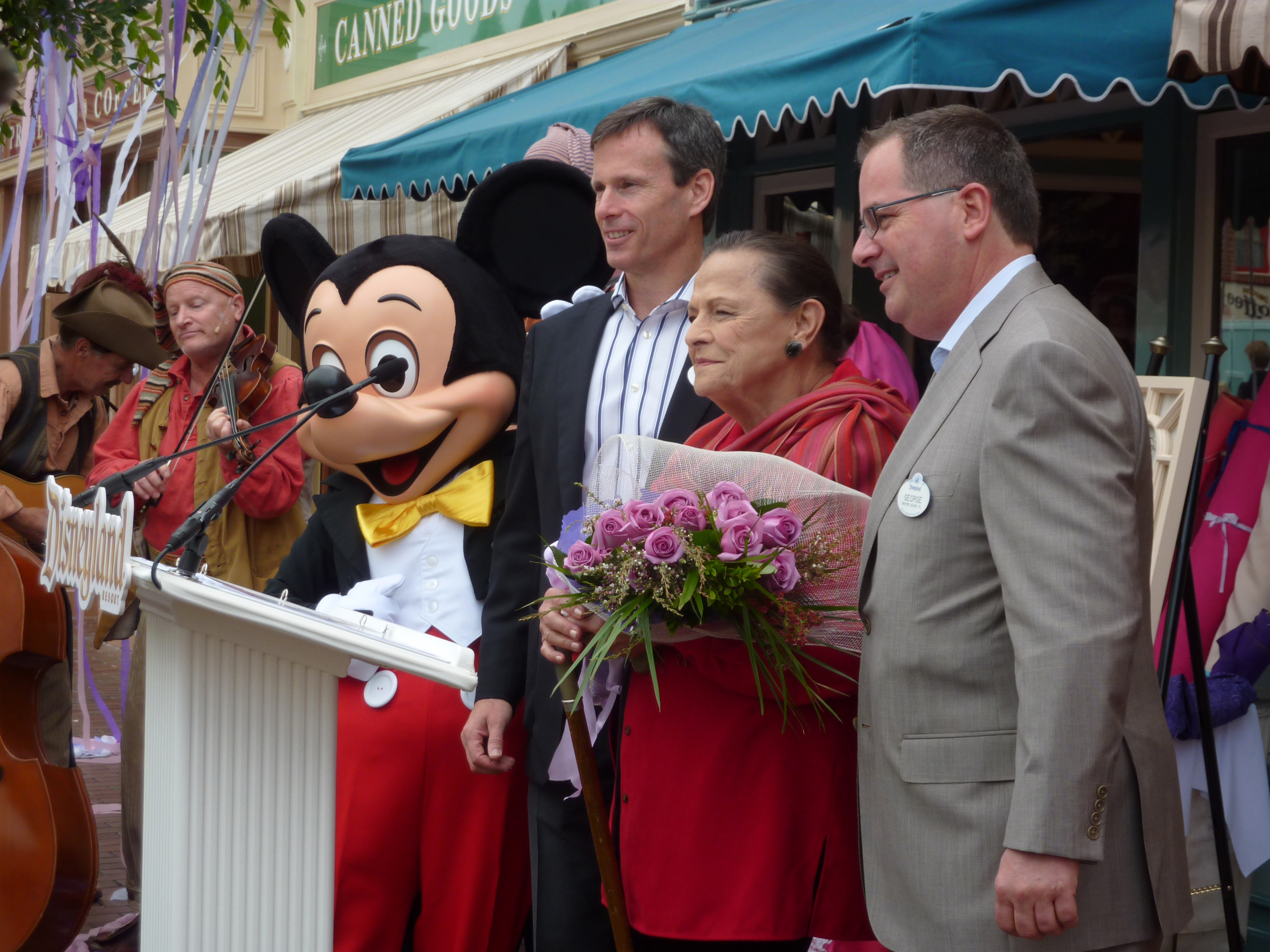
Alice Davis honored in Disneyland May 2012 with a dedicated Main Street window.

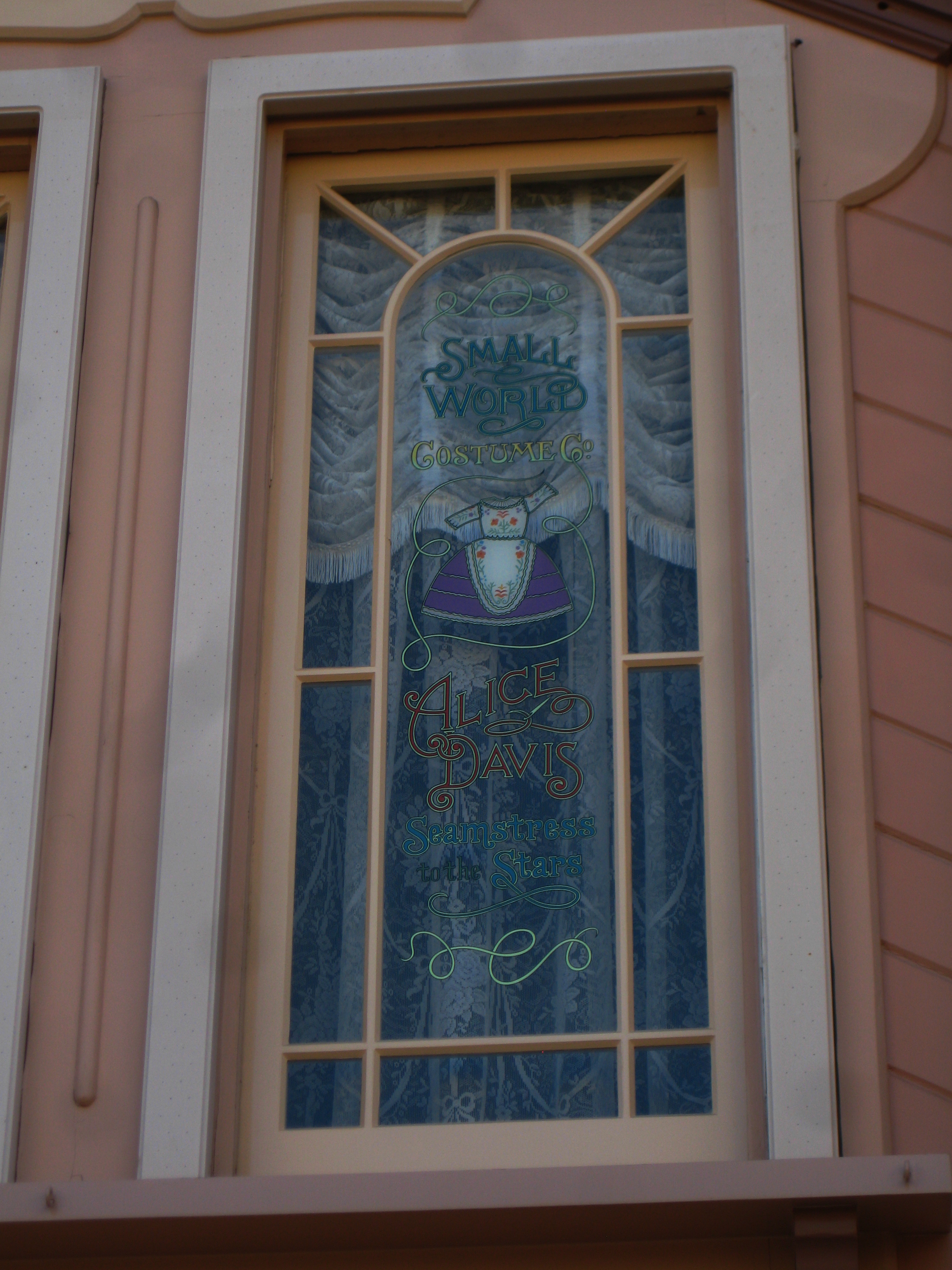
Main Street window in Disneyland to honor Alice Davis.

In 2014, Davis was the recipient of the June Foray Award in recognition of a significant and benevolent or charitable impact on the art and industry of animation.

== Sources ==
- Alice Davis profile, legends.disney.go.com. Accessed November 4, 2022.
- Disney, Walt (prod.) & Sklar, Martin (writer) (1967): From Pirates of the Caribbean to the World of Tomorrow.
- Alice Davis Celebrates 89th Birthday, mousewait.com. Accessed November 4, 2022.
