= Ron Dominguez =

American businessman (1935–2021)

Ron Dominguez (August 10, 1935 – January 1, 2021) was an American businessman who served as vice-president of Disneyland from 1974 until 1990, and of Walt Disney Attractions from 1990 until his retirement in 1994.

A scion of the Southern California Dominguez family, he and his family lived on the land in Anaheim where Disneyland was to be built. Disney purchased his family's land and a neighboring family's land and moved the two families' houses in between Main Street, U.S.A. and Tomorrowland and combined them into the first Disneyland administration building.
