= Leota Toombs =

American artist and imagineer

Leota Toombs Thomas
- Born: Leota Anne Wharton; August 9, 1925; California, U.S.
- Died: December 21, 1991 (aged 66)
- Occupations: Artist, animator, designer
- Years active: 1940–1991
- Employer: WED Enterprises
- Notable work: Haunted Mansion
- Spouse: Harvey Toombs
- Children: Kim Irvine, Launie Toombs
- Honours: Disney Legends

Leota "Lee" Toombs Thomas (born Leota Anne Wharton; August 9, 1925 – December 21, 1991) was an American artist and Imagineer at WED Enterprises, who worked on several original attractions at Disneyland Park. She had an extensive career at The Walt Disney Company, beginning in the company's Ink and Paint department in 1940 and later transferring to the Animation Department, where she met her first husband, lead animator Harvey Toombs. Toombs is best known for serving as the model for the character Madame Leota in the Haunted Mansion attraction. She was officially named a Disney Legend for her contributions in the categories of Attractions and Imagineering in 2009.

== Career ==
Toombs began her career at Disney in the Ink and Paint department in 1940. Despite the fact that few women were admitted to the Animation Department at the time, the Ink and Paint department was composed entirely of women whose job was to "transfer the [animators'] drawings to sheets of transparent celluloid and outline the characters with pen and ink". The role of these women at the company was later detailed in the book "Ink & Paint: The Women of Walt Disney's Animation". Toombs later transferred to the Animation Department where she met lead animator Harvey Toombs (known for his work on films such as Dumbo, Lady and the Tramp, Peter Pan, and Sleeping Beauty), whom she married in 1947. Toombs left the company to raise the couple's two children, but returned in 1962 to work at WED Enterprises (later known as Walt Disney Imagineering) as one of the company's first female Imagineers during the creation of several original Disneyland attractions.

Once at WED Enterprises, Toombs began work developing designs and creating models for Disney's attractions for the 1964-65 New York World's Fair, including It's a Small World, and Great Moments with Mr. Lincoln, both of which still run today at Disneyland. After the conclusion of the Fair, Toombs contributed to the creation of Disneyland attractions such as Pirates of the Caribbean, Walt Disney's Enchanted Tiki Room, and the Country Bear Jamboree.

However, Toombs is best known for her contributions to the original Haunted Mansion, which opened on her 44th birthday. She served as the facial model for Madame Leota, the floating fortune-teller head portrayed in all iterations of the attraction, and she contributed her voice to the character of "Little Leota", also based on her likeness, who tells visitors to "hurry back" at the end of the attraction. Her daughter, Kim Irvine, who has also served as a Disney Imagineer since 1970, described how her mother was selected in an interview for Toombs's induction into the Disney Legends: “When Yale Gracey was experimenting with ideas for a gypsy in a crystal ball, he asked Leota if she would mind posing for the head... they were a close-knit group, and Mom said she thought it sounded fun. Blaine [Gibson] made a life mask of her face and Yale, Wathel [Rogers] and the rest of the team filmed her, crazy makeup and all. I still remember when she wore it home that night! Then they created the ‘Little Leota’ bride at the end of the ride. Since that figure is small, they wanted a high voice, so they kept mom's voice because she sounded like a little girl.” Toombs herself recalled the experience saying "as I remember, my eyes were the right distance apart to fit the test model when the whole thing began.” Toombs later moved to Orlando, Florida in 1971 to become part of the Imagineering team at Walt Disney World, where she served as part of the "on-site team that would maintain shows and attractions." Toombs returned to her role as an Imagineer at Disneyland in California in 1979, where she served as a trainer for artisans and figure-finishers. Toombs died in December 1991 in her hometown at La Cañada Flintridge, California.

== Legacy ==
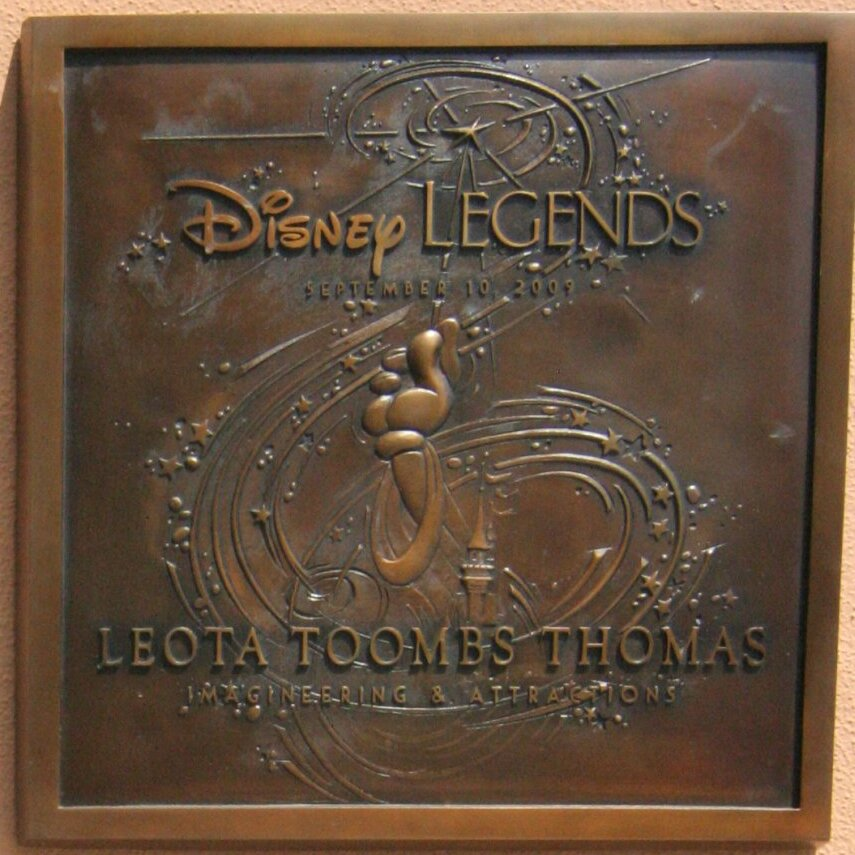
Leota Toombs Disney Legends plaque at Walt Disney Studios in Burbank, California

Toombs was posthumously declared a Disney Legend in 2009. Her daughter, Kim Irvine, also named a Disney Legend in 2026, served as the art director at Disneyland from 1970 to 2025, and has been described by the Los Angeles Times as "arguably the person most responsible for maintaining the look and feel of Disneyland." She was the facial model for Madame Leota for the Haunted Mansion Holiday at Disneyland, recreating the character originated by her mother. She recently led the team responsible for creating the park's largest ever expansion, Star Wars: Galaxy's Edge. Irvine started her career at the Imagineering Model Shop in 1970, where she was trained and mentored by Toombs. Of the experience, Irvine said "It was a unique situation to be trained by your mom! She was a wonderful teacher and friend. Anyone who knew her loved her, and many Imagineers owe some of their success to her for passing on the tribal knowledge that is so important to our product."
