= Van Arsdale France =

Joseph Van Arsdale France (October 3, 1912 – October 13, 1999) was an American businessman. He is credited with establishing the process for training new employees in Disney-owned and other "theme parks" around the world.

== Early career ==
Prior to working for Disney, France's skills in labor relations landed him a job as director of education for the Fort Worth Division of General Dynamics. His work in labor relations and training next led him to an appointment as a civilian educational consultant for the U.S. Army in England and later, Germany.

Upon France’s return to the U.S., he became superintendent of industrial relations for Kaiser Aluminum Corporation's Mead Works and director of labor relations for Kaiser Frazer in Michigan.

He also opened a small paper goods business in Rhode Island.

== Disney career ==
Van joined Disney in March 1955, and over the years, performed many roles at Disneyland, including area manager of Tomorrowland, conducting training of line supervisors, organizational chairman of the Disneyland Recreation Club, and coordinator of the first Disneyland Cast Member magazine, "Backstage Disneyland."

In 1978, he retired from Disney and became a special consultant at Disneyland.

== After Disney ==
He also went on to author Old Dogs Can Learn New Tricks, a career guide for senior working adults, as well as his autobiography, Window On Main Street, 35 Years of Creating Happiness at Disneyland Park. He remained an active member of the Disneyland Alumni Club and spoke on Disneyland history at conventions around the country.

== Death ==
At age 87, on October 13, 1999, Van Arsdale France died of pneumonia in Newport Beach, California.
