= Jack Lindquist =

American businessman (1927–2016)

- Born: March 15, 1927; Chicago, Illinois, U.S.
- Died: February 28, 2016 (aged 88); Anaheim, California, U.S.
- Education: University of Southern California
- Occupations: Former President, Disneyland Resort
- Notable work: "In Service to The Mouse"

Jack Lindquist (March 15, 1927 – February 28, 2016) was an American business executive who served as president of the Disneyland theme park in Anaheim, California from 1990 until he retired in 1993. He was a Disney employee from 1955 until his retirement, and was a marketing executive in the theme parks division for almost thirty years, including a stint as the first advertising manager for Disneyland. His eventual reach would extend worldwide, having trained and/or greatly influenced others who would become amusement industry leaders, both inside and outside of the Disney attractions. Among the amusement industry, many have credited Lindquist with founding and greatly expanding the arts and sciences of attraction promotion.

== Early years and film roles ==
Born in Chicago and a graduate of Hollywood High School, Jack Lindquist was also involved as a child actor who appeared as an extra in several episodes of the Our Gang short film series and appeared in the film Best Foot Forward with Lucille Ball. He also appeared in the Shirley Temple Black film, The Little Princess, and Laurel and Hardy's Nothing But Trouble, as 'The Kid'. In all, Lindquist spent 15 years acting as an extra in films.

After graduating from high school, Lindquist enlisted in the U.S. Air Force where he spent two years. He then attended college at the University of Southern California (USC), where he was a member of the Theta Xi Fraternity and the Trojan Knights.

Upon completion of his education, Lindquist began working in the field of advertising. At a mid-sized Los Angeles based advertising agency, Lindquist represented the client Kelvinator appliances, promoting the company's washers, dryers, refrigerators, and other appliances on television and radio. As a sponsor of the Disneyland park, Kelvinator invited Lindquist to view the park during construction, and also later invited back to the Disneyland park on Sunday, July 17, 1955, as a part of the special televised press preview day.

== Disney years ==
Two months after the park's official opening, Lindquist received a phone call from early management at Disneyland (Milt Albright) asking for suggestions of an available advertising manager. Lindquist suggested himself and was in turn offered the job.

As one of the initial Disneyland park employees, and as Disneyland's first Advertising Manager, Lindquist assumed increasing responsibilities that aided his growth in the company as one of the lead executives overseeing the Disneyland parks. In 1965, he earned the title, Director of Marketing, and then when Walt Disney World opened in Orlando, Florida in 1972, he was named Vice President of Marketing for Disneyland and Walt Disney World. Four years later, Lindquist assumed the role of Vice President of Marketing for Walt Disney Attractions. In 1982, with the addition of the park, Tokyo Disneyland and Disneyland Paris, Lindquist was again promoted to Executive Vice President of Marketing and Entertainment, overseeing not only the parks in the United States, Japan and France, but also for the company's outdoor recreation activities.

== Advertising innovator ==
As advertising executive with the Disney company for 38 years, Jack Lindquist pioneered advertising and marketing promotions that were successfully replicated industry-wide. In many ways, the Disneyland park was the test bed and incubator for the establishment of marketing techniques for the increasingly popular concept of modern amusement park, the Theme Park. Thus, many of the advertising, marketing and public relations techniques used by many in today's outdoor entertainment industry are based on the examples that Lindquist pioneered through the Disneyland experiences and experiments. Likewise, some of the marketing and advertising ideas that were pioneered in the Disneyland park were also applied outside the amusement park field and into the modern day marketing and sales of modern-day live performances and events.

== Off-site ticket sales for special events ==
=== New Year's Eve ===
With Disneyland's first New Year's Eve event, Jack Lindquist conceived the marketing and sales of advance ticket purchases that would be sold at local participating stores, outside of the park. To justify the operating cost for a New Year's Eve event, the park would have needed to sell approximately 6,000 tickets. The ability to meet that number of ticket sales from the park gates, the day of the event, was not guaranteed. The solution was to attempt to sell tickets in advance, from local stores. As such, from approximately ten local participating stores located across Southern California, such as Wallichs Music City on Sunset and Vine in Hollywood, and Desmond's upscale men's store in Long Beach, Disneyland was able to pre-sale approximately 5,000 advance tickets. Combining that with approximately 3,500 tickets sold in advance at the park for the New Year's Eve event, the success of the event ticket sales established the template for the future of off-site, pre-sale tickets for special events. The option to pre-sale tickets for upcoming special events has since been used by theme parks, industry-wide. Likewise this has become commonplace practice for event ticket sale opportunities used among the leisure and entertainment industries alike for concerts, theater, and sporting events.

=== Grad Night ===
In response to a high school night the preceding year, in which students were involved in a tragic automobile accident, Jack Lindquist and co-worker, Bill Schwenn, met with several women from local high school Parent-Teacher Association(PTA) groups to discuss the opportunity for a safe graduate evening party within the Disneyland park. Realizing that it would not be operationally feasible to justify opening the park only for the total of 800 students the women represented, Lindquist opened the event to additional area high school graduating classes. To fill the park so that it could afford to adequately staff and run the park for the Grad Night evening, tickets were sold to students from eight Southern California high schools, at a cost of $3.95 per ticket, from which a total of 8,500 attended on the first Grad Night party of June 15, 1961. As a result of the success of this first event, Disneyland's Grad Night became an annual event. By 2012, Disneyland had hosted over five million graduates from thousands of Southern California high schools. In 2013, the Grad Night event moved out of the Disneyland park and into the adjacent Disney California Adventure park.

The tradition of Grad Night proved so successful that it continued every year since 1961 in Anaheim, and eventually grew to also take place at the parks in Walt Disney World, Tokyo Disneyland and Disneyland Paris. Aside from the annual Grad Night at the Disney parks, many industry parks plan similar annual special events for graduating high school seniors. Knott's Berry Farm in Buena Park, CA, the Six Flags theme parks, Universal Studios theme parks and even Dollywood in Pigeon Forge, Tennessee, all promote an annual special event to open the park to graduating high school seniors in the evening hours.

== Anniversary tie-ins and giveaways ==
A popular marketing campaign that Jack Lindquist also pioneered, which is now repeated industry-wide among parks, started with the anniversary tie-in. In a desire to capture some of the millions of visitors attending the 1984 Olympics that were to take place in Los Angeles, Lindquist realized that the year would also be the 30th anniversary of the Disneyland park. While 30th anniversaries are rarely a cause for celebration, it would be marketed, regardless, as a milestone year. The marketing campaign used "presents" and "giveaways" to incentivize visits to the park. Lindquist worked with General Motors, who was a new Disney Participant at the Epcot park at Walt Disney World, Florida, and worked out a deal where the Disneyland park gave away a total of 106 General Motors automobiles throughout the 30th Anniversary year. The success of the Anniversary giveaways drew a total of 12,040,000 people to the Disneyland park that year, around three million more than the 9.2 million who attended the park the previous year.

Today, what was started by Lindquist, using anniversaries as a marketing tool, have become a common marketing practice at many other theme parks. Not only do parks celebrate their anniversary, some even celebrate the anniversary of rides and attractions. To celebrate the 20th anniversary of the park's BATMAN Ride, the Six Flags Magic Mountain park in Valencia, California, offered to run the 50 mph, 2,700 foot track ride backwards through the spring 2014 season. Similarly, for the celebration of the Pigeon Forge, Tennessee theme park, Dollywood, the park not only designed a season's marketing campaign around the anniversary, but park namesake and country music performer, Dolly Parton used the opportunity to promote the park through a televised anniversary special that included popular performers such as Miley Cyrus, country music performers Brad Paisley, Kenny Chesney, and Reba McEntire, as well as multiple Grammy Award winner Kenny Rogers.

== Commercial tie-ins ==
Commercial tie-ins with Disneyland commenced with the planning and development of the park in the 1950s. With the need to raise money to finance the park, Walt Disney entered into a production agreement with the ABC television network to provide weekly programming in exchange for a line of credit to be used to pay for the park's development, as well as to market the park, itself, through the programming of a weekly program: Disneyland. The weekly show featured themes in keeping with the different themed areas of the namesake amusement park.

Jack Lindquist later helped to create one of today's most recognized commercial tag-lines, and celebratory tradition, when the New York Giants won Super Bowl XXI in 1985, and quarterback Phil Simms was the first to utter the phrase: "I'm Going to Disneyland." while on the East coast broadcasting feed, the line was: "I'm Going to Disney World."

== Disney Dollars ==
Upon reading of the rise of the British pound in the financial section of a newspaper, Lindquist was inspired to create a real currency for Disneyland and Walt Disney World. Disneyland, after all, was at that time drawing approximately 12 million people a year and an additional 24 million would visit the Walt Disney World resort; a transient population greater than many small countries.

The first Disney Dollars, an "A Series", were released in 1987 in both Disneyland and Walt Disney World, Florida. The printing process and special 100% cotton paper was used, to give the currency a look and feel of legal tender. The bills would be used as face value currency within the Disney theme parks, with 870,000 of the original series printed for the May 5, 1987 release date in both the Disneyland and Walt Disney World resort. By 1996, Disney had exchanged approximately $135 million in Disney Dollars.

Following the example of the Disney Dollar, Dolly Parton's Dollywood theme park in Pigeon Forge, Tennessee offers its own form of namesake currency in the form of "Dolly Dollars."

== Archive collection ==
In 1994, Lindquist was named trustee of Chapman University in Orange, California and in 2002 received Emeritus status, yet continued to speak twice a year at the university to students studying marketing strategy. In 2013, the university dedicated the "Jack and Belle Lindquist Dream Room and Disney Collection" in the university's Leatherby Library. The room contains two large display cases featuring portions of Lindquist's personal collection of awards and rare memorabilia. The artifacts on display feature only a small portion of the entire collection of awards and rare memorabilia that Jack Lindquist donated to the university for safekeeping and archiving. Other artifacts in the collection are rotated on an ongoing basis.

== Legacy ==
Jack Lindquist's eventual reach was worldwide, having trained three generations of young leaders within Disney, who went on to lead attractions around the globe, both inside and outside of the Disney organization. One example was Matt Ouimet, who started his career within Disney, where he learned directly from Lindquist. Ouimet later left Disney to lead other international attraction companies, and is currently president and CEO of Cedar Fair Entertainment Company, owners of approximately 19 amusement and water parks in the United States and Canada. In an indirect manner, Tom Mehrmann, the current CEO of Ocean Park, Hong Kong, learned indirectly form Jack Lindquist by competing against Lindquist while working at Disneyland rival theme park, Knott's Berry Farm, in Buena Park, California. Many amusement industry executives credit Jack Lindquist with founding and greatly expanding the arts and sciences of attraction promotion.

== Recognition ==
After Lindquist retired, he received a commemorative window on Main Street, U.S.A., at Disneyland that reads J.B. Lindquist, Honorary Mayor of Disneyland. In 1994, he was named a Disney Legend.

In Disneyland's Mickey's Toontown, in the yard of Goofy's Playhouse, there was a pumpkin in the Jack-O-Lantern patch that has the face of Jack Lindquist to pay tribute to him. Though the pumpkin was removed during the 2023 refurbishment of the area, it was incorporated into a framed Halloween photo of the Goof Troop cast inside Goofy's Playhouse.
