= Fred Joerger =

Fred Joerger (1913–2005) was one of Disneyland's original model makers, or "imagineers". He was recruited from Warner Bros by Walt Disney himself in 1953, and created models for most of Disneyland's original attractions, including the steamboat Mark Twain, Main Street, the Matterhorn and the Sleeping Beauty Castle.

Joerger was born in Illinois in 1913. He graduated from the University of Illinois at Chicago with a fine arts degree in 1937. He was named a Disney Legend in 2001. He died in 2005.
