= Winnie the Pooh: The New Musical Adaptation =

2021 musical by Jonathan Rockefeller

- Broadway promotional poster
- Music: Richard M. Sherman; Robert B. Sherman
- Lyrics: Richard M. Sherman; Robert B. Sherman
- Book: Jonathan Rockefeller
- Setting: England
- Basis: Winnie-the-Pooh by A. A. Milne
- Productions: 2021 Off-Broadway; 2022 Chicago; 2022 Off-Broadway revival; 2022 US national tour; 2023 London; 2023 UK and Ireland tour; 2023-2024 Netherlands and Belgium; 2024 Japan; 2024 São Paulo; 2025 Toronto

Winnie the Pooh: The New Musical Adaptation is a 2021 musical based on the film franchise of the same name. The music and lyrics were written by the Sherman Brothers with a book by Jonathan Rockefeller. The production also borrows elements from the short stories of the same name.

Produced by Disney Theatrical Productions, the musical had its debut at the Theatre Row Building in New York City in October 2021 and was met with a positive critical response.

== Development ==
In 2019, it was reported that there had been plans to adapt the Winnie the Pooh stories into a Broadway musical with a book written by Pulitzer Prize-winning playwright Edward Albee (Who's Afraid of Virginia Woolf?), but those plans were put on hold when Albee became busy. In May 2021, Disney Theatrical Productions announced that the Winnie the Pooh stories would be adapted as a musical, utilizing puppetry to portray the characters.

== Productions ==
=== Off-Broadway (2021) ===
Previews occurred Off-Broadway at the Theatre Row Building in New York City from October 21, 2021, until its world premiere on November 4, 2021. Jonathan Rockefeller adapted the characters, while utilizing several pieces of music and lyrics from the Sherman Brothers. In September 2021, the cast was revealed to consist of Jake Bazel as Pooh, Chris Palmieri as Tigger, Kirsty Moon as Piglet/Roo, Emmanuel Elpenord as Eeyore/Owl/Rabbit, and Kristina Dizon as Kanga, while Sebastiano Ricci served as an understudy. After an open call for young actors, Kaydn Kuioka, Max Lamberg and Cooper Lantz were cast to share the role of Christopher Robin. The production closed on January 30, 2022.

=== Chicago (2022) ===
A production began playing at Mercury Theatre Chicago in Chicago for a limited 13-week run lasting from March 15 to June 12, 2022.

=== Off-Broadway Revival (2022) ===
The production returned to the Theatre Row Building in New York City for a limited 6-week run lasting from June 18 to July 31, 2022.

=== US national tour (2022) ===
In June 2022, a US touring production was announced. Performances began on September 16, 2022, at Irving Arts Center in Irving, Texas and were originally set to conclude on May 7, 2023, at Marcus Center in Milwaukee, Wisconsin. However, the production went on hiatus, ending its run early on February 26, 2023, at North Carolina Blumenthal Performing Arts Center in Charlotte, North Carolina.

=== London and UK & Ireland tour (2023) ===
In August 2022, a UK premiere was announced. Performances began on March 17, 2023 in London's Riverside Studios. The cast consisted of Benjamin Durham, Laura Bacon, Harry Boyd, Alex Cardall, Chloe Gentles, Lottie Grogan, and Robbie Noonan. Following the London run, the production toured the UK and Ireland until September 2023.

== Cast ==
| Character | Off-Broadway | Chicago | US national tour |
| Character | 2021 | 2022 | 2022 |
|---|---|---|---|
| Pooh | Jake Bazel | Will B. Rupert | Coldin Grundmeyer |
| Tigger | Chris Palmieri | Josh Bernaski; Sebastiano Ricci | Josh Bernaski; Luke Dombroski; Blake Rushing |
| Eeyore/Owl/Rabbit | Emmanuel Elpenord | Frank Cesario | Josh Bernaski; Luke Dombroski; Blake Rushing |
| Piglet/Roo | Kirsty Moon | Emilie Rose Danno; Tina-Kim Nguyen; Carolyn Plurad | Kaitlyn Lunardi; Melissa Xiaolan Warren; Hannah Lauren Wilson |
| Kanga | Kristina Dizon | Emilie Rose Danno; Tina-Kim Nguyen; Carolyn Plurad | Kaitlyn Lunardi; Melissa Xiaolan Warren; Hannah Lauren Wilson |
| Christopher Robin | Kadyn Kuioka; Max Lamberg; Cooper Lantz | William Daly | Ross Coughlin |

== Musical numbers ==
The show features songs from several Winnie the Pooh films, including Winnie the Pooh and the Honey Tree, Winnie the Pooh and the Blustery Day, The Tigger Movie, and Piglet's Big Movie; all songs were written by the Sherman Brothers, except where otherwise noted.

- "Winnie the Pooh" – Chorus, Pooh
- "A Rather Blustery Day" – Pooh, Chorus
- "The More It Snows"† – Pooh, Piglet
- "The Wonderful Thing About Tiggers" – Tigger
- "Sing Ho for the Life of a Bear"† – Pooh, Chorus
- "Whoop-De-Dooper Bounce" – Tigger, Pooh, Roo, Rabbit
- "Rumbly in My Tumbly" – Pooh
- "The Wonderful Thing About Tiggers" (reprise) – Tigger

† Music and lyrics by Carly Simon

== Reception ==
Alex Reif of The Laughing Place gave a positive review, saying the show "captures the charm and whimsy of A. A. Milne's timeless stories and Disney's memorable animated adaptations." Alexia Fernández of People commented on the production, saying the life-sized puppetry was "stunning". Writing for Yahoo!, Fernández also said the show "has already broken theatre box office records for the largest advance of any show at Theatre Row in New York City.
