= Piglet's Big Game =

2003 video game

- PAL region PS2 cover art
- Developer: Doki Denki Studio (Note: The Microsoft Windows version developed by Hulabee Entertainment.)
- Publisher: Gotham Games (Note: Disney Interactive published the Game Boy Advance and Microsoft Windows versions. THQ published the Game Boy Advance version in Europe.)
- Director: Pascal Stradella
- Series: Winnie the Pooh
- Engine: RenderWare (GC, PS2)
- Platforms: GameCube, PlayStation 2, Game Boy Advance, Windows, Mac
- Release: Windows/Mac: NA: March 11, 2003; EU: 2003; Game Boy Advance: NA: March 11, 2003; PAL: December 3, 2003; GameCube: NA: March 21, 2003; PAL: July 2, 2003; PlayStation 2: NA: March 21, 2003; PAL: July 18, 2003
- Genres: Action-adventure (consoles); Point-and-click adventure (Windows)
- Mode: Single-player

Disney's Piglet's Big Game (stylized as Piglet's Big ~~Movie~~ Game in North America) is a 2003 action-adventure game developed by French developer Doki Denki Studio. Intended towards younger audiences, the game is based on the Disney version of the Winnie the Pooh franchise. The game is loosely based on Piglet's Big Movie, and centers around Piglet and how he tries to overcome his fears.

The GameCube, PlayStation 2 and Game Boy Advance versions of the game feature seven levels which focus on Piglet entering his friends' dreams to help them with their problems. Enemies such as Heffalumps and Woozles can be encountered in certain locations and Piglet must pull a face to scare them away. The GameCube version received mixed or average reviews, while the Game Boy Advance version was given higher reviews; retrospective reviews of the GameCube and PlayStation 2 versions have been more positive. A separate Windows game was also released, which was a point-and-click adventure game in which Piglet helps Rabbit make soup for their friends.

Years after the game's quiet initial release, the GameCube and PlayStation 2 versions became a viral phenomenon online in 2024 when the game's music and gameplay were compared to the Resident Evil and Silent Hill franchises. Amid the newfound attention, the game's director Pascal Stradella confirmed that Resident Evil was an inspiration for the game.

== Gameplay ==
=== GameCube, PlayStation 2, and GBA versions ===
The game features seven levels which focus on Piglet entering his friends' dreams to help them with their problems. Enemies such as Heffalumps, Woozles, scary trees, a talking door, and walking mirrors (who are only found in the GBA version) can be encountered in certain locations and Piglet must make use of Brave Faces (where he pulls a face) to scare them away. This can be done by completing a code shown at the bottom of the screen. Some enemies have abilities that can hinder Piglet's attempts to scare them. An enemy getting too close to Piglet will result in him getting scared. Should this happen, Piglet can find a Christopher Robin balloon to comfort him. Cookies can be used to purchase different Brave Faces to use; these cookies are hidden in or behind stationary objects (five in each object) and can be collected by kicking the objects.

Some levels have a part where the player can play as another character who can help Piglet progress in a quest. Tigger is playable in Roo and Rabbit's dreams, and his level segments involve him having to sneak past Heffalumps and Woozles in order to stay out of their view range. Pooh is playable in Owl and Tigger's dreams, and his level segments involve him having to run from Heffalumps and Woozles (after they heard his tummy rumbling) in order to be able to complete a task for Piglet.

=== Microsoft Windows version ===
The Windows version focuses on a point-and-click adventure style. Piglet has the ability to move to different locations and pick up items. Several minigames are also playable, such as a painting minigame located at Eeyore's home; not only can players paint pictures on Eeyore's easel, but they can also paint pictures from Piglet's scrapbook.

== Plot ==
=== GameCube and PlayStation 2 versions ===
The game starts with Piglet observing Pooh reaching for a beehive, Roo reaching for a ball that is caught in a tree, Owl trying to remember where his memory book is, Rabbit planting his carrots, Eeyore having his usual gloomy days, and Tigger painting his house to look like him. During this, Piglet is frightened by a shadowy monster called the Granosorus, but it disappears before his friends can see it. Christopher Robin tells him that it was part of his imagination and that he must overcome his fears. However, Piglet says that heroes are supposed to be big and brave, and since he is the opposite, he is convinced that he will never become a hero.

As Piglet sadly leaves the Hundred Acre Wood, his friends start to fall asleep doing what Piglet saw them doing. At the same time, Piglet discovers a mysterious telescope which causes him to magically enter their dreams and begins to help them with their problems such as giving Pooh honey, helping Roo find his ball, searching for Owl's memory book, helping Eeyore find colors, helping Rabbit harvest his carrots, and finding Tigger's missing stripes. Along the way, he faces off against many kinds of Heffalumps, Woozles, living trees, and a sentient door.

After helping them all, the Hundred Acre Wood gets flooded and Piglet attempts to save his friends, who are trapped on islands with Heffalumps and Woozles. Once Piglet rescues everyone, the Granosorus appears, but Piglet is able to scare it off. Christopher Robin comes and after learning of Piglet's bravery and heroism, he gives everybody a picnic to celebrate.

=== Game Boy Advance version ===
After having a nightmare involving a monster called the Granosorus, Piglet runs towards his friends warning them of the monster before Christopher Robin calms him down. He explains that the nightmares can teach him how to be brave, so Piglet leaves to find out how to do so while his friends begin to fall asleep. Piglet discovers several dream portals, allowing him to enter their dreams and help them find their possessions and battles Heffalumps, Woozles, sentient mirrors, and living trees; the talking door also appears in this version. Every dream from the console version of the game is present in this game except Owl's and Tigger's. After helping everyone, a flood covers the woods, forcing Piglet to face his fears rescue his friends while dealing with many enemies, and eventually the Granosorus. Once everyone is rescued and the Granosorus is scared away, Christopher Robin arrives and after finding out that Piglet has faced his fears, he gives everyone a picnic to celebrate Piglet's bravery.

=== Microsoft Windows version ===
In the Windows version, Piglet pays a visit to Rabbit's house, where Rabbit is busy making soup for his friends. He decides to help collect the soup ingredients from his friends to help Rabbit finish it. The ingredients list consists of honey, thistles, milk, pepper, haycorns, and a random vegetable from Rabbit's garden; Pooh was supposed to bring the honey, Eeyore was supposed to bring the thistles, Kanga and Roo were supposed to bring the milk, and Owl was supposed to bring the pepper, but none of them have come back with the ingredients. After Piglet brings all the ingredients to Rabbit, everyone (except Kanga and Roo) arrives for the party, so Rabbit leaves Piglet in charge of preparing the soup. Once the soup is finished and ready, everybody gathers at a picnic table to eat, where they thank Piglet for his help.

== Reception ==
Reception

Aggregate score
Aggregator	Score
Metacritic	(GC) 70/100

Review scores
Publication	Score
GameSpot	(GC) 7/10
IGN	(GC) 7/10 (PS2) 7/10 (GBA) 6.5/10

The GameCube version received "mixed or average" reviews according to Metacritic. Ryan Davis, in a review for GameSpot, deemed the game very much superior to most children's games and movie tie-ins, and praised the voice acting, sound and art design (which features "surreal" imagery of the character's dream worlds). Davis also noted the game's gentle pace.

IGN's Chadd Chambers gave both the GameCube and PlayStation 2 versions a 7.0/10, finding the gameplay simple but well-executed and easy to control and the battle system well-suited for the young target audience due to its lack of violence. He compared the graphics positively to the look of the cartoon and praised the "quite enjoyable" art direction, the real-time shadows, and the quality of the cut-scenes. The Game Boy Advance version was given a 6.5/10, writing, "This surreal, wonderfully produced game is perfect for youngsters."

Retrospective reviews of the GameCube and PlayStation 2 versions, made after the game's renewed interest in 2024, have been more positive. TheGamer commented that the game "reminds us of what gaming has lost", saying that "smaller, more creative games can save us."

== Legacy ==
The GameCube and PlayStation 2 versions became a viral phenomenon online in November 2024, after a user on X (Twitter) shared a video that went viral showcasing the game's soundtrack and gameplay, and several YouTubers and social media influencers including Vinny Vinesauce compared the game's music, gameplay and visuals to the Resident Evil and Silent Hill survival horror franchises. One key composition that was highlighted was an eerie-sounding track, titled by its file name as "SMIS_103_01_3C", popularly given the name "Foreboding 1" on YouTube (as the in-game music does not have official titles), which uses a sample from the same sample pack that was used in a track in the 2024 remake of Silent Hill 2.

Interest in the game also spiked on eBay, with physical copies selling for as much as US$300. As of November 11, 2024, the PS2 and GameCube editions were selling for up to $1,200 on some online stores. Amid the newfound attention, the game's director, Pascal Stradella, who worked on the now-defunct Doki Denki Studio, has come forward sharing pages of the game's design document and concept art on social media, and confirmed that Resident Evil was an inspiration for the game, as well as Luigi's Mansion. He called it a "kind of cartoon Resident Evil dealt with in a comic way."
