= Winnie the Pooh: Adventures in the 100 Acre Wood =

2000 video game

- Developers: NewKidCo; TOSE
- Publishers: NA: NewKidCo; JP: Tomy
- Producers: Emiko Yamamoto; Tomomi Endo (Assistant Producer); Patrick Larkin (Assistant Producer)
- Series: Winnie the Pooh
- Platform: Game Boy Color
- Release: NA: March 2000; JP: July 7, 2000
- Mode: Single-player

Winnie the Pooh: Adventures in the 100 Acre Wood is an adventure game developed by NewKidCo and TOSE and published by NewKidCo and Disney Interactive. It was released in North America in March 2000 and in Japan on July 7, 2000 for the Game Boy Color.

The game follows Winnie the Pooh as he interacts with other characters in the wood. Most of the game uses a board game structure, where the player rolls a dice and draws cards to move around on the map in an attempt to explore the wood. The game is aimed at a younger demographic and was designed to be simple. It was the first Winnie the Pooh game to be released on a video game console.

== Gameplay ==
Pooh and Rabbit move during the board game portion of gameplay.

The game has both arcade-style minigames and simple adventure game aspects. Most of the game uses a board game mechanic similar to the Mario Party series. It is easy to progress through the game, and if the player fails a challenge, the game will allow them to continue anyway. The vast majority of the game is found in the board game section, where Pooh explores the 100 Acre Wood and helps Christopher Robin and his friends through different problems. As the player completes different parts of the adventure, they are stored in Pooh's bookshelf in his house which the player can review at any time.

The mini-games found inside of the game are similar to Game & Watch, and are mostly simple tasks that the player can easily complete. These include a Simon Says-style game where the player follows Pooh's prompts, and a mini-game where the player must collect falling acorns for Piglet.

== Media used in the game ==
- Winnie the Pooh and the Honey Tree (when encountering Rabbit)
- Winnie the Pooh and the Blustery Day (when encountering Piglet)
- Winnie the Pooh and Tigger Too! (when encountering Tigger)
- Winnie the Pooh and a Day for Eeyore (when encountering Eeyore)
- The Tigger Movie (at the end when encountering Christopher Robin and having collected all 8 storybooks)

== Reception ==
Reviews for the game focus on its extremely easy difficulty and its aim at a younger demographic. IGN's Craig Harris felt that it was made for the under-ten crowd and noted that "there's nothing here that would last the veteran gamer for more than an hour". Nintendo Power praised the game's graphics and felt that Winnie the Pooh: Adventures in the 100 Acre Woods would "enchant the tots and tenderhearted".
