= Heffalump =

Fictional species from Milne's Winnie the Pooh stories

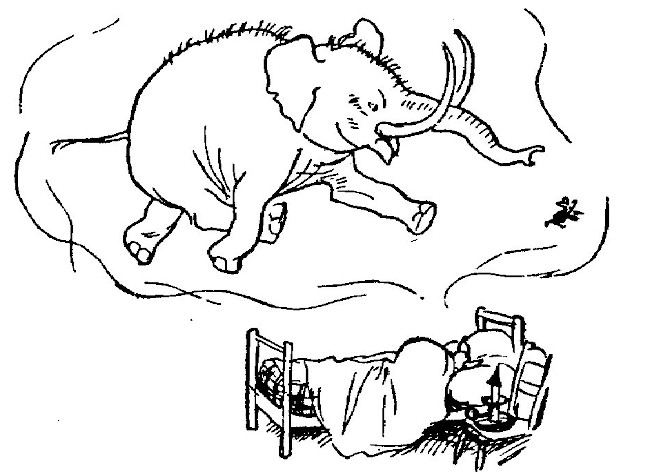
Piglet dreams of the Heffalump. E. H. Shepard's original illustration, from Winnie-the-Pooh, shows the "elephant" inspiration

A Heffalump is an elephant-like creature in the Winnie-the-Pooh stories by A. A. Milne. Heffalumps are mentioned, and only appear, in Pooh and Piglet's dreams in Winnie-the-Pooh (1926), and are seen again in The House at Pooh Corner (1928). Physically, they resemble elephants; E. H. Shepard's illustration shows an Indian elephant. In Disney's Winnie the Pooh franchise, they are mentioned repeatedly, with several Heffalumps appearing featured in the animated television series The New Adventures of Winnie the Pooh (1988–1991), followed by two animated films in 2005 featuring a Heffalump as a main character, Pooh's Heffalump Movie and Pooh's Heffalump Halloween Movie.

== Origins ==
Although the fifth chapter of Winnie-the-Pooh is titled "In Which Piglet Meets a Heffalump", Piglet only actually meets a Heffalump in his imagination. In this chapter, Pooh and Piglet bravely attempt to capture a heffalump in a clever trap; however, no heffalumps are ever caught, and indeed they never meet a heffalump in the course of the books. The sole appearance of heffalumps in the books is imagined, as Pooh tries to put himself to sleep:

[H]e tried counting Heffalumps [but] every Heffalump that he counted was making straight for a pot of Pooh's honey ... [and] when the five hundred and eighty-seventh Heffalump was licking its jaws, and saying to itself, "Very good honey this, I don't know when I've tasted better", Pooh could bear it no longer.

In the third chapter of The House at Pooh Corner, Pooh and Piglet fall into a similar trap (it is implied it was the same trap) and think that it was made by a Heffalump to catch them. Pooh and Piglet rehearse the conversation they will have when the heffalump comes, but Pooh falls asleep and when Piglet hears a voice, he panics and says the wrong thing. He is mortified when the voice turns out to be that of Christopher Robin.

== Explanation ==
Although this is not explicitly stated, it is generally thought that heffalumps are elephants from a child's viewpoint (the word "heffalump" being a child's attempt at pronouncing "elephant"). Shepard's illustrations in Milne's books depict heffalumps (in Piglet's dreams) as looking much like elephants.

=== Disney version ===
In Disney's adaptations of the stories, Heffalumps are first mentioned in the 1968 featurette Winnie the Pooh and the Blustery Day and later The Many Adventures of Winnie the Pooh, and seem to be a product of Tigger's imagination. They appeared with their partners, the woozles, in a song called "Heffalumps and Woozles" during a nightmare that Pooh has. Here, Tigger described them as honey-eating creatures. In both the animated films and all subsequent television series, they are also depicted as looking like elephants, albeit slightly cuddlier and less fierce than those Pooh imagines in the books, with rabbit-like tails and stitches as would be found on a stuffed animal.

In the animated television series The New Adventures of Winnie the Pooh, most heffalumps are enemies of Pooh and his friends. They are known to steal honey and are often associated with woozles. One particular heffalump named Heff was the dim-witted sidekick of Stan the Woozle and was afraid of Roo because he thought Roo was a giant mouse.

Piglet befriended a young heffalump named Junior in two episodes of The New Adventures of Winnie the Pooh. Junior lived with his parents, Papa Heffalump (voiced by Jim Cummings) and Mama Heffalump. Mama Heffalump often had to remind Papa Heffalump of his many allergies.

Lumpy the heffalump playing with Roo in a book that's based on Pooh's Heffalump Movie.

Pooh's Heffalump Movie, released in 2005, looks at the differences between the denizens of the Hundred Acre Wood, and the Heffalumps, cleared up after Roo becomes friends with a Heffalump named Lumpy. A sequel to this movie called Pooh's Heffalump Halloween Movie, was later released. Lumpy later appears in the television program My Friends Tigger & Pooh, where he continues to appear as Roo's friend and joins the gang on many adventures.

They and the song are also featured in the attraction at the Magic Kingdom in Walt Disney World, Disneyland, Hong Kong Disneyland and Shanghai Disneyland, also called The Many Adventures of Winnie the Pooh, where the riders travel through the heffalumps and woozles in Pooh's dream.

There are several Winnie the Pooh video games where the Heffalumps are an antagonist to the storyline of various levels in Piglet's Big Game and Winnie the Pooh’s Rumbly Tumbly Adventure. Each video game was developed on various platforms such as the Nintendo Game Boy Advance, Nintendo GameCube, PC, and Sony PlayStation 2.

In a fantasy sequence in the 2018 film Christopher Robin, when the title character almost drowns in a Heffalump trap, he hallucinates seeing an actual elephant as a Heffalump.

== Cultural impact ==
Since the 1950s heffalumps have gained notability beyond the Pooh stories.

- The term "heffalump" is whimsically used by adults to describe an elephant, or a child's view of an elephant.
- The term "heffalump trap" has been used in political journalism for a trap that is set up to catch an opponent but ends up trapping the person who set the trap (as happens to Winnie the Pooh in The House at Pooh Corner).
- The protagonist, Gnossos Pappadopoulis, in Richard Fariña's 1966 novel Been Down So Long It Looks Like Up to Me believes his best friend to be named Heffalump for the majority of the novel, although Gnossos discovers in Cuba that Heffalump's birth name was Abraham Jackson White.
- There is an orchestral score called To Catch a Heffalump (1971) by Willem Frederik Bon.
- The Swedish newspaper Expressen's Heffalump Award is an annual literary prize awarded to the year's best Swedish author for children and young adults.
- A search for "heffalon particles" is the subject of an April Fool's Day paper posted on a scientific pre-print server.
- The heffalump operator "=>" is used in the BCPL programming language for structure references.
- The 2018 Cosmo Sheldrake song "Come Along", featured in an ad for the iPhone XR, contains the line "Come along, catch a Heffalump".
- The longstanding Labour MP for Liverpool Walton from 1964 to 1991, Eric Heffer, taciturn and portly, was often known in satirical media stories as "The Hefferlump", initially in Private Eye magazine and then elsewhere.
- The 2020 Song Heffalumps by Sematary and Ghost Mountain references Heffalumps.
- In March 2024, shortly after Winnie-the-Pooh: Blood and Honey 2 was released, it was announced that Winnie-the-Pooh: Blood and Honey 3 – The Lost Years had entered development, and will feature Heffalumps.
- The videogame Diplomacy is not an Option features Heffalumps.
