= The Many Adventures of Winnie the Pooh (attraction) =

Dark ride at Disney theme parks

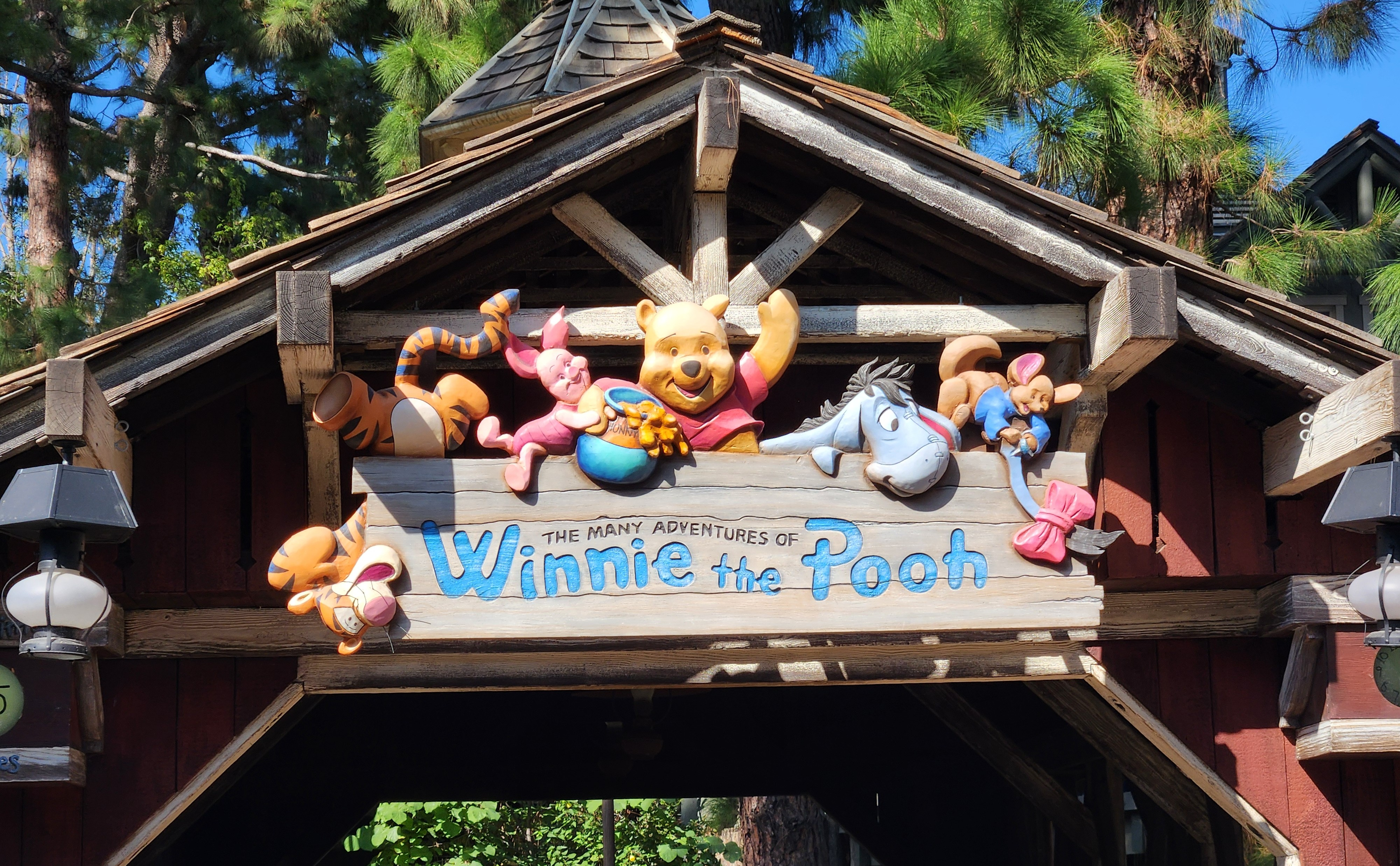
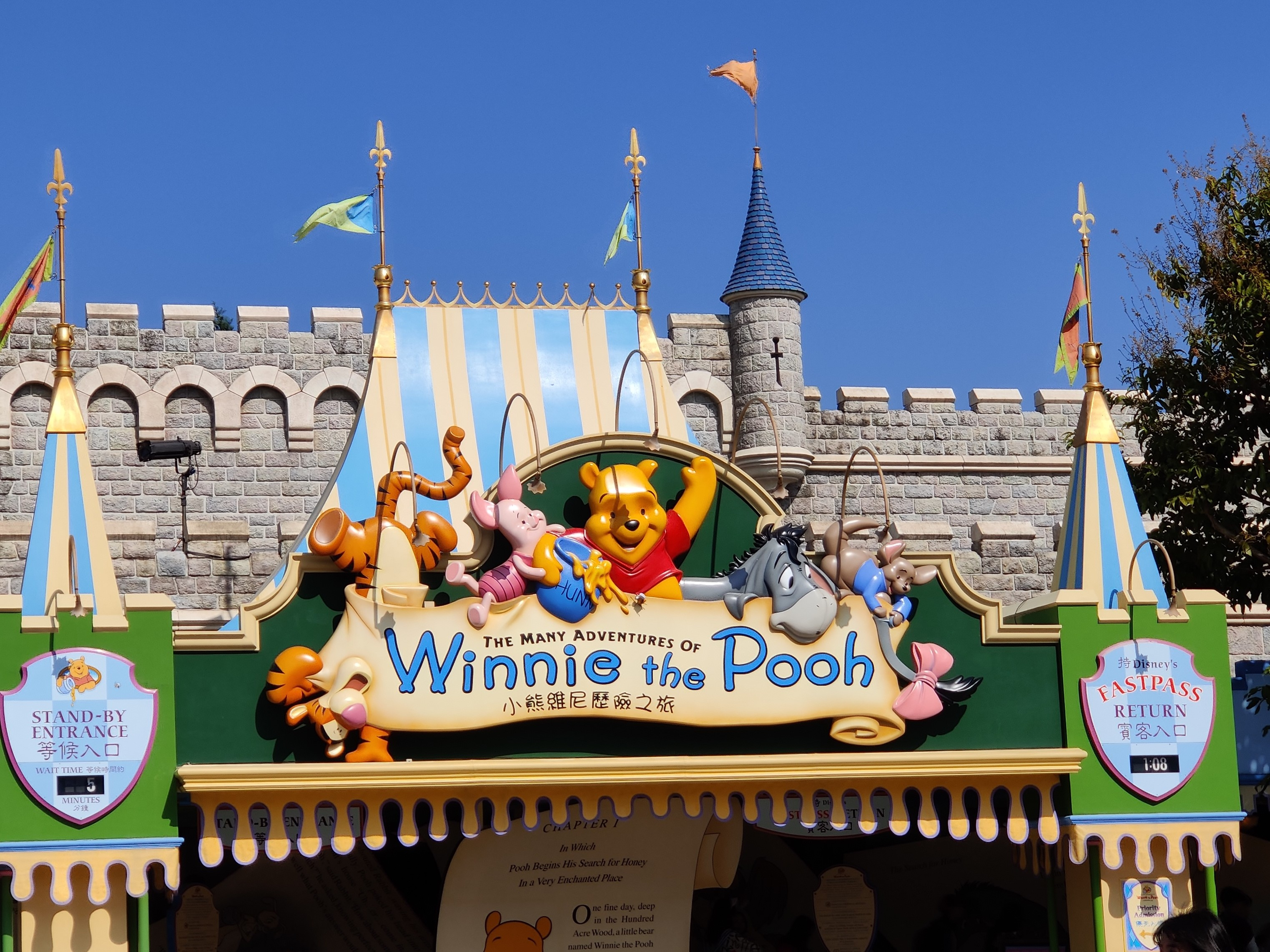
- The attraction's entrance at Disneyland (above) and Hong Kong Disneyland (below)

Magic Kingdom
- Area: Fantasyland (Enchanted Forest)
- Coordinates: 28.4199°N 81.5802°W
- Status: Operating
- Opening date: June 5, 1999
- Replaced: Mr. Toad's Wild Ride
- Lightning Lane available

Disneyland
- Area: Critter Country (2003–2024); Bayou Country (2024–present)
- Coordinates: 33.8127°N 117.9232°W
- Status: Operating
- Opening date: April 11, 2003
- Replaced: Country Bear Jamboree

Hong Kong Disneyland
- Name: The Many Adventures of Winnie the Pooh 小熊維尼歷險之旅
- Area: Fantasyland
- Coordinates: 22.3129°N 114.0405°E
- Status: Operating
- Opening date: September 12, 2005
- Disney Premier Access available

Shanghai Disneyland
- Name: The Many Adventures of Winnie the Pooh 小熊维尼历险记
- Area: Fantasyland
- Status: Operating
- Opening date: June 16, 2016
- Disney Premier Access available

Ride statistics
- Attraction type: Dark ride
- Theme: The Many Adventures of Winnie the Pooh
- Vehicle type: Honeypot (Florida/Shanghai/Hong Kong); Beehive (California)
- Duration: 3:15
- Directed by: Greg Smith
- Produced by: Paul Winchell
- Theme by: Danny Elfman
- Written by: Bobby Cook
- Music by: Carl Johnson
- Casting by: Lisa Schaffer
- Voice Director: Jamie Thomason
- Special Thanks: Walt Disney Movies Co. Ltd; Walt Disney Staff
- Wheelchair accessible
- Assistive listening available

The Many Adventures of Winnie the Pooh is a dark ride based upon the 1977 film of the same name, itself based on the Winnie-the-Pooh books by A. A. Milne. The attraction exists in slightly different forms at the Magic Kingdom in the Walt Disney World Resort, Disneyland, Hong Kong Disneyland, and Shanghai Disneyland.

== History ==
=== Original proposals ===
After the rise in popularity of Walt Disney's film adaptation of Winnie the Pooh, Disney Imagineers made plans in the late 1970s for a Winnie the Pooh attraction at Disneyland's soon-to-be renovated Fantasyland. However, in 1983, when the renovated Fantasyland reopened, a Winnie the Pooh attraction was absent.

Following the success of the 1988 film Who Framed Roger Rabbit, plans were made for a new section of the park located behind Fantasyland. Called Mickey's Toontown, this section of the park would recreate the Toontown that was seen in the film. One of the rides that would have gone on the east side of this land was a Winnie the Pooh dark ride in which guests would ride in honey pots that they could spin (much like the Mad Tea Party in Fantasyland) through scenes from the three Winnie the Pooh featurettes. The ride was ultimately canceled however, and the space that this ride was to have taken up and vehicle design were reworked into Roger Rabbit's Car Toon Spin.

=== Magic Kingdom ===
Seven years later, during a period when the character was undergoing a resurgence in popularity, plans for a Winnie the Pooh attraction were approved at a different park: Walt Disney World's Magic Kingdom. Planners instead decided to utilize an existing structure: that of the Fantasyland attraction Mr. Toad's Wild Ride.

The ride was retained during the Fantasyland expansion and in 2010, it received a new queue resembling the Hundred Acre Wood. Called Pooh's Interactive Queue, it incorporates a playground with children's games, allowing some members of a party to play while others hold space in line.

=== Disneyland ===
An original plan from the mid-1990s placed an indoor and outdoor light boat ride featuring a Winnie the Pooh theme at Disneyland. This plan was shelved by 1999, so a new dark ride was planned. Disneyland is the only one of the six Disney resorts to have little room for expansion. The solution to open this attraction in the park was to replace an existing attraction with this new ride.

Fantasyland was ruled out because it contained the least amount of available space and because of the age of its buildings; park managers anticipated that the attraction would be popular and decided to place it in an area that could better accommodate the crowds. Critter Country, a small parcel between New Orleans Square and Frontierland, was ultimately chosen since Winnie the Pooh already had his own greeting area and Pooh Corner shop in that land by 1996. The area already featured two attractions, Splash Mountain (1989–2023) and Country Bear Jamboree, the latter being the first attraction to open in the land (then Bear Country) in 1972.

Imagineers chose to replace the Country Bear Jamboree with Pooh due to its lack of popularity and a proposal for a new Country Bear racing attraction called the "Critter Country 500" being rejected by management. As a tribute to Country Bear Jamboree, the heads of Max the deer, Melvin the moose and Buff the buffalo are mounted in the wall inside the ride.

The budget for the attraction was set at a reported $30 million, most of it dedicated to reformatting the Country Bear Jamboree show building. When it finally opened in 2003, it received large promotions by park management and lines were somewhat long at first, but quickly dropped off. Disneyland was planning to have a media event scheduled for April 11, 2003, but on April 2, the park announced that it would be canceled.

In November 2024, Critter Country was renamed Bayou Country.

=== Hong Kong Disneyland ===
Hong Kong Disneyland, which opened in September 12, 2005, opened with The Many Adventures of Winnie the Pooh as the only dark ride in Fantasyland (the only other dark rides in the park were Buzz Lightyear Astro Blasters and Space Mountain). It was the only dark ride in the Hong Kong Fantasyland until the opening of It's a Small World in 2008. It is most similar to the first version at the Magic Kingdom.

=== Shanghai Disneyland ===
Shanghai Disneyland, which opened on June 16, 2016, opened with The Many Adventures of Winnie the Pooh. Once again, it is similar to the Magic Kingdom version but mostly identical to the Hong Kong version.

In 2018, a Business Insider news report claimed that the Winnie the Pooh theme could be banned and replaced with a new one, due to ongoing memes comparing Pooh and the General Secretary of the Chinese Communist Party Xi Jinping. However, as of 2023, the Pooh Bear themed rides still remains operational and available to the public.

== Ride-through ==
=== Magic Kingdom, Hong Kong and Shanghai Disneyland versions ===
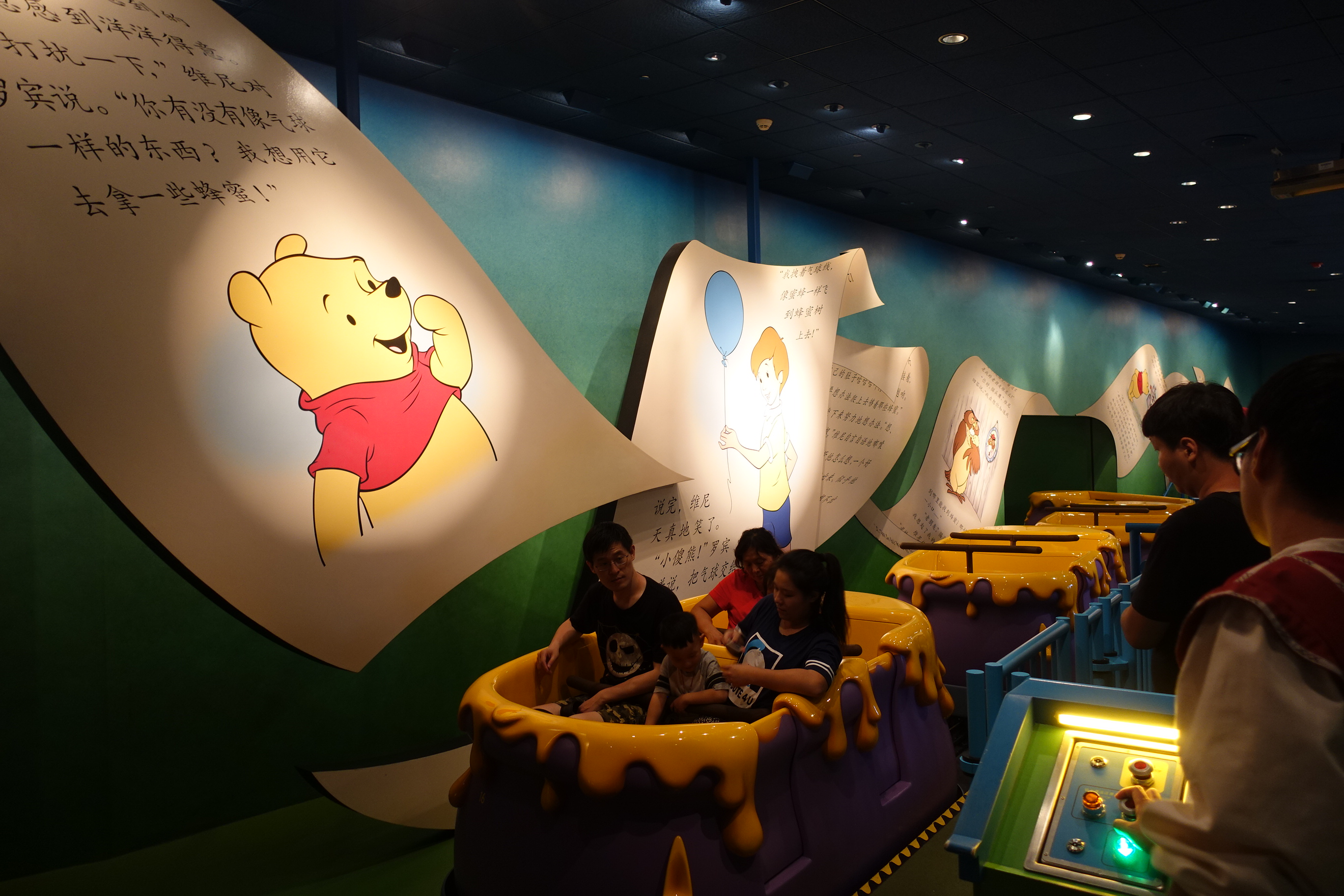
The attraction's interior at Shanghai Disneyland.

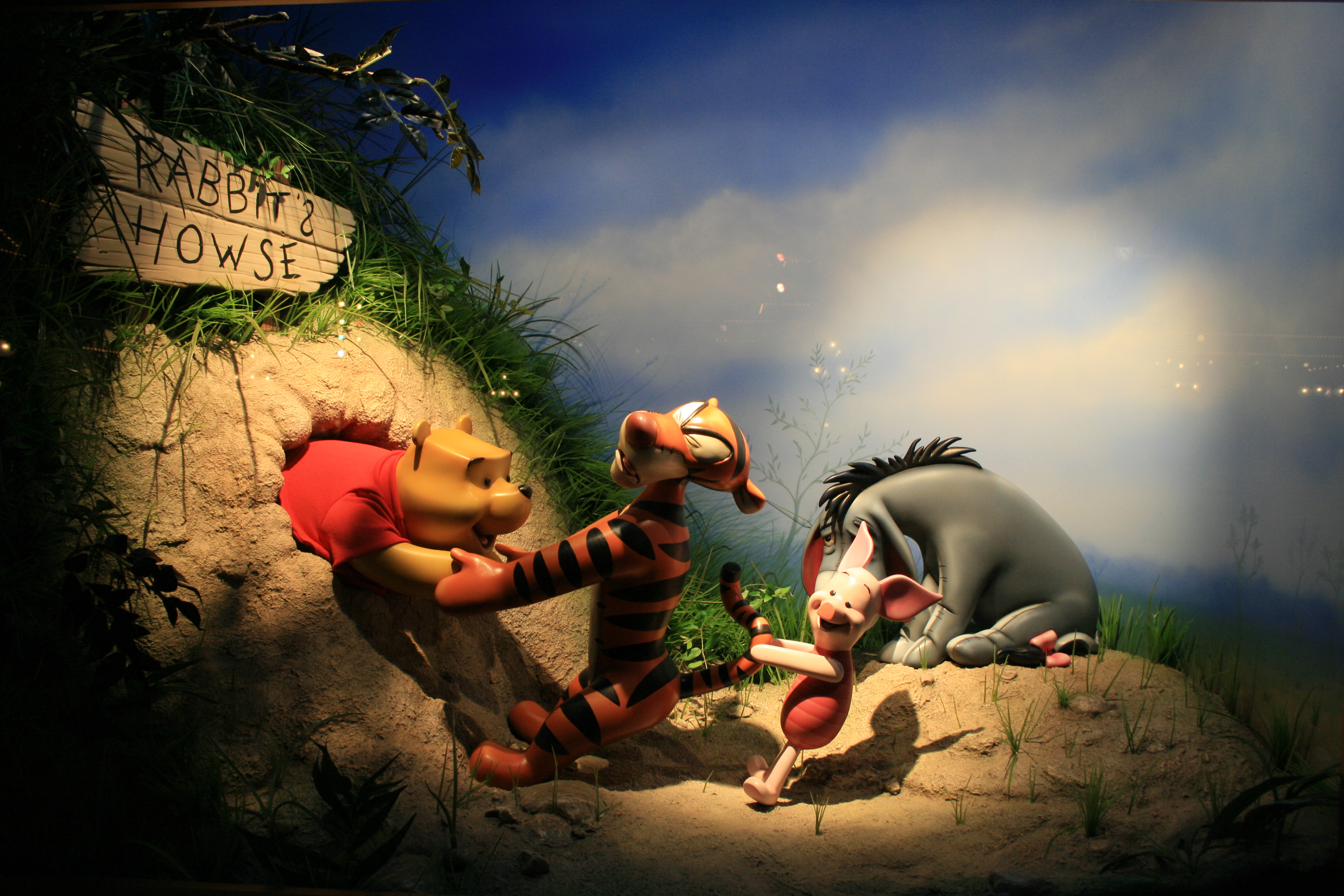
The interior of The Many Adventures of Winnie the Pooh at Hong Kong Disneyland in 2007

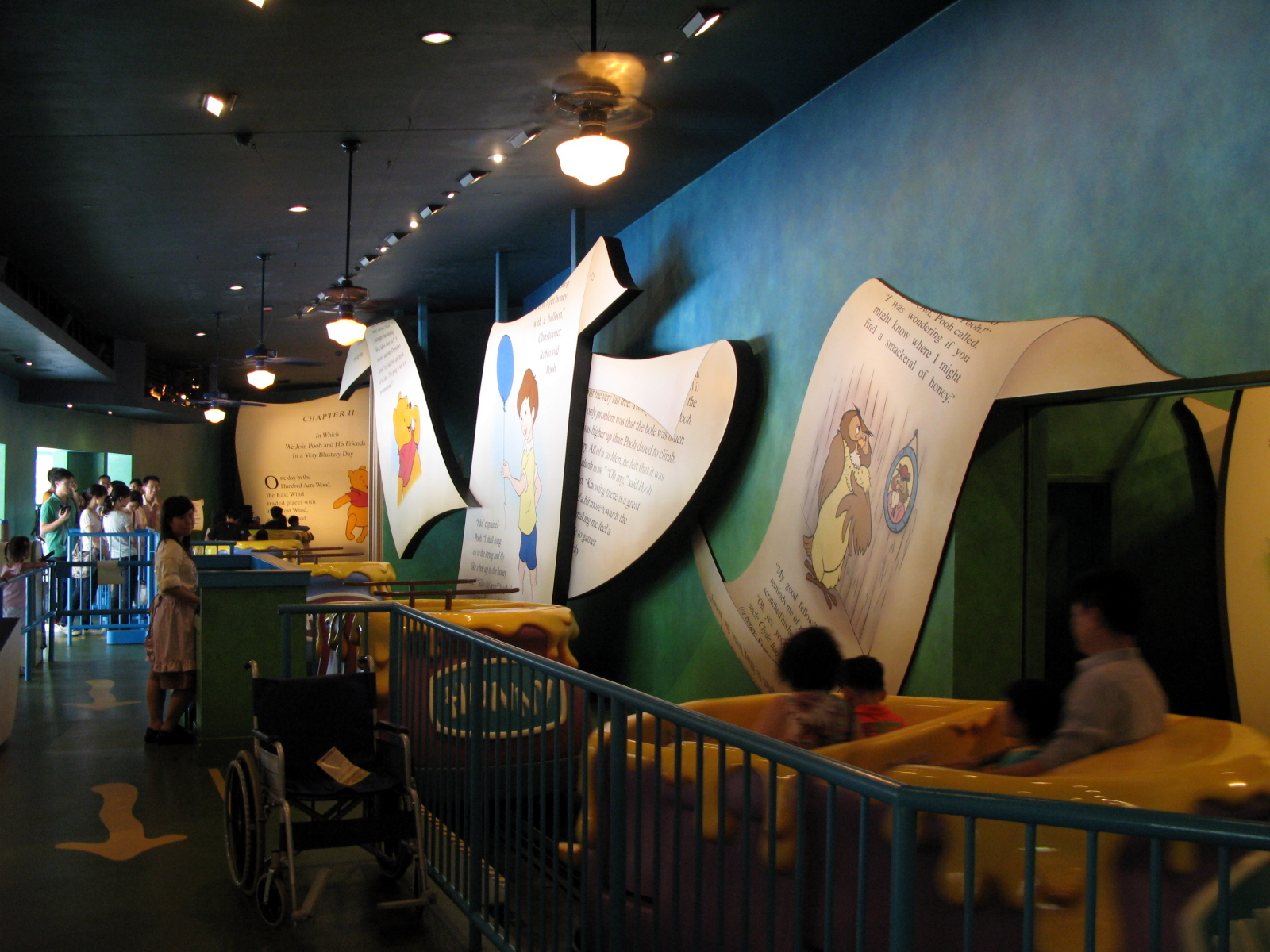
The loading area of The Many Adventures of Winnie the Pooh at Hong Kong Disneyland

The ride vehicles exit the load area and arrive near a giant storybook showing Winnie-the-Pooh and Christopher Robin. The vehicles arrive in the Hundred Acre Wood during a rather blustery day (thus placing the events of the ride at Winnie the Pooh and the Blustery Day, instead of Winnie the Pooh and the Honey Tree, which is considered the beginning of The Many Adventures of Winnie the Pooh), with Piglet holding onto a broom while being spun around. Pooh is holding onto a balloon while trying to reach for some honey, while Eeyore patronizes him. Meanwhile, Roo begins to be blown away as Kanga holds onto him.

In Owl's home, everything is scattered about, including a rather curious picture of J. Thaddeus Toad himself handing a deed over to Owl. There is also a picture of Pooh greeting Moley (Mr. Toad's sidekick), which is flat on the floor to the right. These were placed as a subtle tribute to Mr. Toad's Wild Ride, the ride that The Many Adventures of Winnie the Pooh replaced at the Magic Kingdom (another tribute to Mr. Toad's Wild Ride at the Magic Kingdom comes in the form of a Mr. Toad statue in the Pet Cemetery outside the Haunted Mansion in Liberty Square), The Mr. Toad portraits appear on Magic Kingdom and Hong Kong versions.

The ride then passes a second giant storybook page, where suddenly Tigger bounces out, whilst the ride vehicles begin to bounce like Tigger. The ride follows Tigger through the Hundred Acre Wood, where he randomly pops up. Tigger bounces upside down at one point before the ride moves on to Pooh's home. It transpires that Tigger has pinned Pooh to the floor as he tells him about heffalumps and woozles. Once in Pooh's house, Pooh falls asleep, and magically floats up into the sky, as the room blackens and is lit up by fiber optics (Pooh's floating is achieved with the Pepper's ghost illusion).

The ride vehicles then move into a strange room as Pooh floats through. There are honey pots with eyes and mouths, while giant Woozles with jack-in-the-box necks move in front of the guests. The ride moves around some very strange objects: a purple woozle lights a heffalump, causing a giant smoke ring to come from its trunk (in both the Hong Kong and Shanghai Disneyland versions, it was replaced with a heffabee taking a picture of a yellow heffalump in a green uniform, acting as the on-ride photo op.), and a giant heffalump has holes that reveal the way out of the heffalumps and woozles scene. As the guests continue through the scene, two dancing heffalumps and woozles simultaneously change colors and patterns on the wall, a harp playing heffalump is playing her harp made out of honey, Giant balloons fly up in the air and two watering cans pouring (fake) rain on the riders to indicate the end of the heffalumps and woozles scene.

After this, the vehicles arrive in a room painted with rain and cloud patterns, as thunder and lightning go off, and then reenters the Hundred Acre Wood, which is experiencing the rainstorm. The ride vehicles begin to "float", although this is achieved by moving the vehicles at a steady speed. Eeyore complains about the wind and then about the rain. Gopher squirts water out of his mouth. Kanga, Roo, Rabbit, Tigger, and Owl attempt to save Piglet from floating away and the ride vehicles move to find Pooh flying around owing to the wind.

The vehicles move into the final scene, where everyone apart from Pooh is celebrating that the rain has gone away. Piglet is a sculpted figure with movement, while Tigger, Rabbit, Eeyore, Owl, Kanga, and Roo are illustrations on the wall behind. The vehicles move past Pooh enjoying a load of honey and then go past a page that reads "The End" before arriving back in the load area.

This attraction was the last time Paul Winchell voiced Tigger.

=== Disneyland version ===
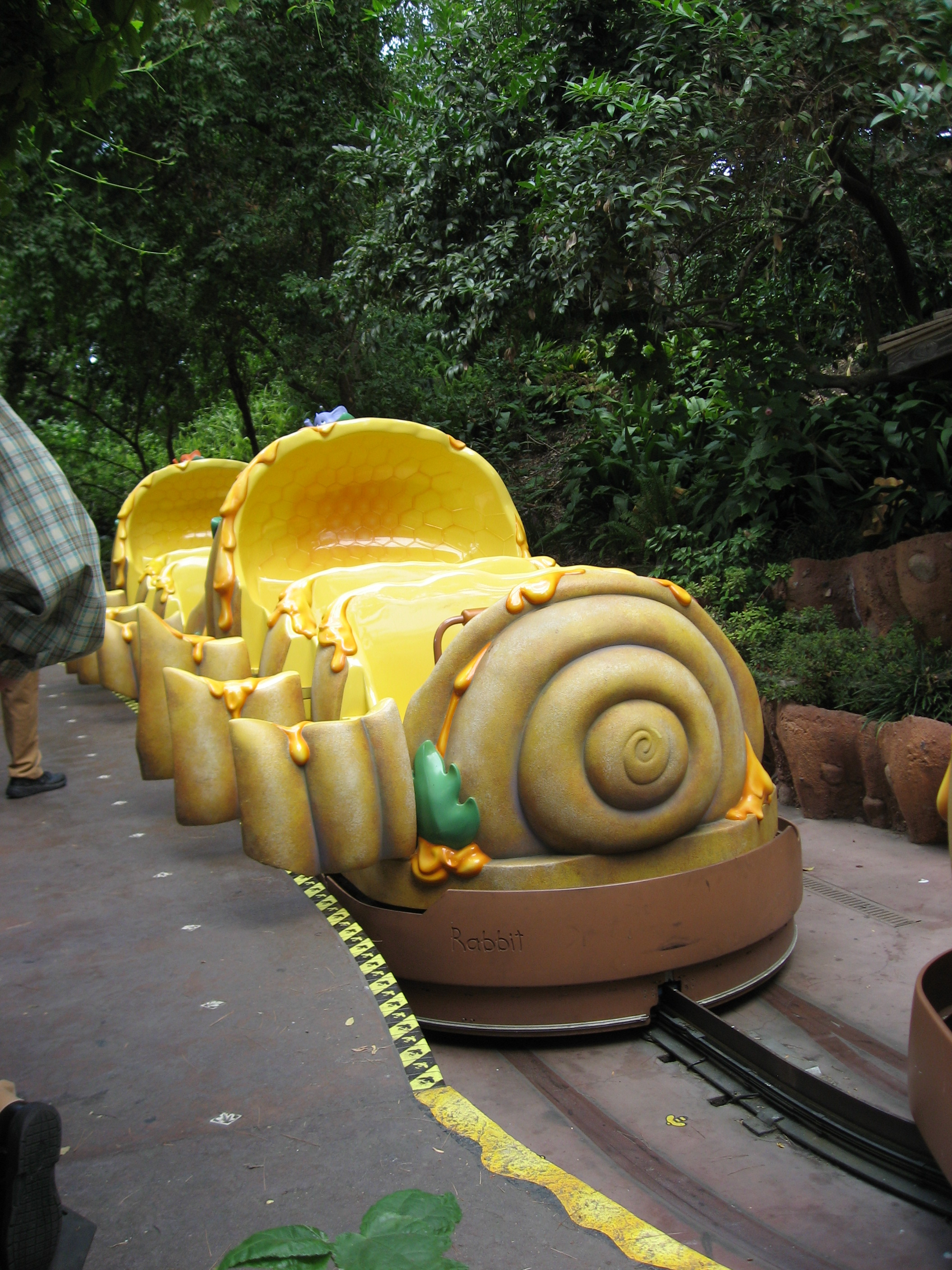
Beehive ride vehicle

While the Magic Kingdom, Hong Kong, and Shanghai versions are very similar, the version of the ride at Disneyland is unique. The ride vehicles resemble beehives, rather than the honey pots found in other versions of the attraction. Upon leaving the outdoor load area, the ride vehicles arrive indoors into the Hundred Acre Wood where Pooh is swinging in the air with a balloon. With Eeyore and the other characters is Gopher, who appears out of his hole to greet the guests. The ride vehicles move into the rain scene, moved from the second-to-last scene in Florida's to the second scene in California's. Most of the things at this point are identical to Florida's version. The ride vehicles move into the shortened Tigger scene, before moving to Pooh's bedroom, where a scene similar to Florida's version occurs.

The ride vehicles move into the heffalumps and woozles dream sequence where woozles with jack-in-the-box necks watch the guests. A pink Tigger pins Pooh to the floor near some honey. Some of the effects at this part of the ride are similar to Florida's. Another Pooh bobs up and down in a balloon suspended above a swirling whirlpool of honey. The mechanism was the one which once lowered "Teddi Barra" from the ceiling in Country Bear Jamboree, the Audio-Animatronic theater presentation previously housed in the show building.

As the ride vehicles leave this scene, a subtle tribute to Country Bear Jamboree is suspended above the archway. The trophy heads of Max the buck, Buff the buffalo and Melvin the moose, Audio-Animatronics from Country Bear Jamboree, can be spotted if one looks up and backward while leaving the heffalump/woozle room. The vehicles enter the start of the finale scene where Pooh is enjoying honey. The heffalumps can be seen flying off into Pooh's dreamland before several of Pooh's friends tell him to wake up. The ride passes Pooh's bed before moving on to show Pooh's friends (this time all sculpted figures with movement) celebrating his birthday. Several of the gifts Pooh received for his party are shown. The vehicles continue until they reach the unload area.

Disney Imagineer Raymond Kinman, a woodcarver, carved the entrance sign that guests walk under.

Cummings voiced Winnie the Pooh and Tigger in this version of the attraction.

=== Voice cast ===
- Jim Cummings as Winnie the Pooh / Tigger
- Paul Winchell as Tigger (in Magic Kingdom and Hong Kong Disneyland; final production in which Winchell voiced Tigger)
- Steve Schatzberg as Piglet
- Gregg Berger as Eeyore
- Ken Sansom as Rabbit
- Andre Stojka as Owl
- Kath Soucie as Kanga
- Nikita Hopkins as Roo
- Michael Gough as Gopher
- Peter Renaday as the Narrator

== See also ==
- Mr. Toad's Wild Ride
- Peter Pan's Flight
- Snow White's Enchanted Wish
