= Winnie the Pooh's Home Run Derby =

2008 video game

- Original Japanese-language title screen
- Developer: Walt Disney Japan
- Publishers: Walt Disney Japan; Yahoo! Kids (Japan); Disney.com
- Series: Winnie the Pooh
- Engine: Adobe Flash
- Platforms: Browser: Windows 2000 SP3+ or later; Mac OS X Tiger or later
- Release: JP: 2007
- Genre: Sports game
- Mode: Single-player

Winnie the Pooh's Home Run Derby (Note: Japanese: くまのプーさんのホームランダービー!, Hepburn: Kuma no Pū-san no Hōmuran Dābī!) is a 2007 baseball video game developed by Walt Disney Japan. The Adobe Flash–based browser game was first published online at the site DisneyGames.jp, then by Yahoo! Japan at its Yahoo! Kids portal. Later, an English translation became available at disney.com.

The player controls Disney's Winnie the Pooh as a batter in a home run derby contest. Pooh steps up to the plate against eight characters from the Winnie the Pooh franchise as pitchers, culminating in the final boss: Christopher Robin. The player advances by hitting a certain number of balls thrown by each pitcher past the outer bounds of the field. In 2012 and 2013, the game became a viral phenomenon hit because of its extreme difficulty, especially considering its target audience of young children.

== Gameplay ==
The game plays as a typical home run derby, where most aspects of baseball are stripped away in favor of the simple aspect of being pitched baseballs with the goal of hitting home runs. The player controls Winnie the Pooh, using the computer mouse to position him and his baseball bat, and clicking to swing the bat. The game contains eight stages, each with a different Winnie the Pooh series character pitching the ball, each with different type of ways to throw the ball and increasing difficulty. The goal of the game is to hit the target number of home runs in each round. Points are earned for performance, and may be used to purchase upgrades for their speed (which allows the player to move towards the ball more quickly), contact (which makes it easier and more forgiving for the player to hit the ball) and strength (which sends the ball further when hit) as they earn points throughout the stages.

== Release ==
Walt Disney Japan developed Winnie the Pooh's Home Run Derby in Adobe Flash. The game first appeared online at the site DisneyGames.jp at some point no later than December 20, 2007. The game was also published online in 2008 at Yahoo! Kids, a web portal of Yahoo! Japan, and an English translation later became available at disney.com. In light of Adobe Inc.'s discontinuation of Flash Player, the game was removed from its original home at Yahoo! Kids on December 16, 2020.

== Legacy ==
Years after the game's quiet initial release, it went viral worldwide in 2012 and 2013 for its intense difficulty. It first garnered attention from users of the Japanese textboard 2channel circa January 2012. Japanese players nicknamed the batter Winnie the Pooh "Puniki" (プニキ) and final pitcher Christopher Robin "Robikasu" (ロビカス). By January 2013 it became known to Westerners through its spread on sites such as 4chan and Reddit.

Many publications noted the game's extreme difficulty level, especially considering it was designed for a primary intended demographic of children. Multiple publications compared it to the game QWOP due to its similar premise of being simple in concept, but extremely difficult in practice. Eurogamer was more positive about the game, concluding that it "isn't particularly deep, but it is moderately addictive and watching Piglet and company tear Pooh Bear a new one isn't without its charms." Other outlets were less positive, with PCGamesN claiming that the game "reject[s] the laws of physics and fair play" and "would require a child for who is able to bend time and space to their will" to play the game successfully. Kotaku referred to the game's difficulty as "game that's so difficult, you just might smash your monitor ... instead of the nice woodland creatures you know and love, they've been replaced with rocket-armed ür-beasts that would eat Randy Johnson with a side of honey." Many people also felt that the game's difficulty led them into intense anger against the various characters depicted in the game, in contrast to the anthropomorphic animals' popularity as harmless children's characters.

In 2013, Complex named it one of the ten most difficult browser games and called it "just about the most challenging thing you can ever imagine." The 2018 Japanese role-playing game Princess Connect! Re:Dive features a home run derby minigame called "Home Run Drill", noted for its similarity to Winnie the Pooh's Home Run Derby, particularly in its visual presentation, controls, and heightened difficulty.

The mobile game Disney Pixel RPG would add a batter Pooh and pitcher Christopher Robin in 2026.
