= Junius Matthews =

American actor (1890–1978)

- Born: Junius Conyers Matthews; June 12, 1890; Chicago, Illinois, U.S.
- Died: January 18, 1978 (aged 87); Los Angeles, California, U.S.
- Resting place: Forest Lawn – Hollywood Hills Cemetery
- Occupation: Actor
- Years active: 1917–1977

Junius Conyers Matthews (June 12, 1890 – January 18, 1978) was an American actor in films, theater, radio and television. He was the voice of Archimedes the Owl in Disney's The Sword in the Stone in 1963. He was also the original voice of Rabbit in the Winnie the Pooh franchise from 1966 to 1977.

== Career ==
Matthews began his acting career on Broadway in shows like Young Wisdom (1914) and Any House (1916) before he got his first role in a silent film called The Silent Witness (1917). He briefly stopped performing while serving as a private in World War I. Over the course of the 1920s he alternated between stage and radio productions. He later played the role of the Tin Woodsman on a radio version of The Wizard of Oz. His distinctive voice can be frequently heard in supporting roles in radio, particularly westerns where he was often cast as an old codger, miner, or master of the cook wagon. Matthews appeared on the short-lived series Luke Slaughter of Tombstone as Slaughter's sidekick, Wichita, and played Ling Wee, a Chinese waiter, in Gasoline Alley. He also made guest appearances on several television series in the 1950s and 1960s.

=== Winnie the Pooh ===
It was not until the last ten years of his life that Matthews became widely known for his role as Rabbit in the Winnie the Pooh movies produced by the Disney studio from 1966 to 1977, including the featurettes Winnie the Pooh and the Honey Tree (1966), Winnie the Pooh and the Blustery Day (1968), and Winnie the Pooh and Tigger Too! (1974) as well as the feature-length compilation film The Many Adventures of Winnie the Pooh (1977). He played other roles for Disney, most notably the owl, Archimedes, in Disney's The Sword in the Stone (1963). After his death in 1978, first Will Ryan and then Ken Sansom took over the role as the voice of Rabbit.

== Death ==
Matthews died at a Los Angeles hospital from cardiovascular disease on January 18, 1978, six months before he would have turned 88, after a stroke the previous year had left him nearly unable to work. He is buried at Forest Lawn Memorial Park in the Hollywood Hills.

== Filmography ==
Year	Title	Role	Notes
1917	The Silent Witness	Bud Morgan	
1943	Seeds of Freedom	Speaker	
1946	Without Reservations	Charlie Potter	Uncredited
1946	Black Angel	Dr. Courtney	
1946	I've Always Loved You	Little Man	Uncredited
1947	The Shocking Miss Pilgrim	Mr. Carter	Uncredited
1949	Chicken Every Sunday	Deacon Wilson	Uncredited
1951	Half Angel	Timid Man	Uncredited
1952	My Wife's Best Friend	Rev. Dr. Smith	Uncredited
1955	Good Morning, Miss Dove	Mr. Pruitt	Uncredited
1957	Jeanne Eagels	Court Clerk	Uncredited
1958	The Lineup	Jeffers	Uncredited
1959	A Summer Place	Mr. Hamble	Uncredited
1963	The Sword in the Stone	Archimedes The Owl	Voice
1966	Winnie the Pooh and the Honey Tree	Rabbit	Voice
1968	Winnie the Pooh and the Blustery Day	Rabbit	Voice
1974	Winnie the Pooh and Tigger Too!	Rabbit	Voice
1977	The Many Adventures of Winnie the Pooh	Rabbit	Voice; Archive footage
