= Winnie the Pooh's Rumbly Tumbly Adventure =

2005 video game

- North American GameCube cover art
- Developer: Phoenix Interactive
- Publisher: Ubisoft
- Series: Winnie the Pooh
- Engine: RenderWare
- Platforms: PlayStation 2 GameCube; Game Boy Advance
- Release: NA: February 8, 2005; EU: March 11, 2005 (PS2); EU: March 2005 (GBA); Nintendo GameCube: NA: February 15, 2005; EU: March 10, 2005
- Genre: Action-adventure
- Modes: Single-player, multiplayer

Winnie the Pooh's Rumbly Tumbly Adventure is a 2005 action-adventure game developed by French company Phoenix Interactive and published by Ubisoft.

Intended towards younger audiences, the game is based on the Disney version of the Winnie the Pooh franchise. Its gameplay is a lot like Piglet's Big Game. The game was re-released as a PS2 Classic on the PlayStation Store in 2013.

== Gameplay ==
The game has three different modes: Adventure Mode, Junior Mode and Multi-player Mini-Games. Adventure Mode is this game's version of a conventional 'Story Mode', featuring gameplay similar to Piglet's Big Game. Progression is often gated with swarms of bees, which can be removed with pots of honey found scattered around the environment. Heffalumps and Woozles can be found in certain areas and will attempt to eat Pooh, Piglet and Tigger (because of his "rumbly tumbly") and in order to scare them away, Pooh better find and pop a balloon, while Piglet makes brave faces.

Much like Piglet's Big Game, there are some parts in levels where the player can play as other characters. Tigger and Piglet return and retain their abilities to sneak past enemies and scare them with scary faces, respectively, and Eeyore is a new playable character whose level segments involve him running around a location (after being startled) with Pooh riding on his back to complete a task.

Junior Mode is for even younger children and has no objectives to do, and Multi-player Mini-Games allows 1-4 players to play 3 minigames with 2 more being unlockable via Adventure Mode.

== Plot ==
Winnie the Pooh and Christopher Robin take a walk in the Hundred Acre Wood when the former starts complaining that he's hungry. Christopher Robin tells Pooh to think of something else, suggesting that he remember his favorite times. Pooh decides to read the birthday scrapbooks of some of his friends, and finally his own which takes him through flashbacks of his birthday adventures where he looks for Piglet and finds him a broom, searches for Tigger, search for two missing Tigger costumes, looks for a new home for Eeyore, and going on a treasure hunt. After reading them all and completing the adventures, Christopher Robin shows up and gives him a picnic with all of his friends.

== Reception ==
Reception

Aggregate score
Aggregator	Score		
Aggregator	GBA	GameCube	PS2
Metacritic	48/100	59/100	63/100

Review scores
Publication	Score		
Publication	GBA	GameCube	PS2
GameZone	5.5/10	6.5/10	N/A
IGN	N/A	5.5/10	5.5/10
NGC Magazine	3/5	60%	N/A
Nintendo World Report	4/10	7/10	N/A

The GameCube and PlayStation 2 versions received "mixed" reviews, while the Game Boy Advance version received "generally unfavorable reviews", according to video game review aggregator Metacritic.
