= Party Time with Winnie the Pooh =

2001 video game

- Developer: Doki Denki
- Publishers: PS1: NA: Electronic Arts; EU: Sony Computer Entertainment; Windows; Disney Interactive
- Series: Winnie the Pooh
- Platforms: PlayStation, Microsoft Windows
- Release: NA: 2001; EU: 23 November 2001
- Genre: Party
- Modes: Single-player, multiplayer

Party Time with Winnie the Pooh (known as Pooh's Party Game: In Search of the Treasure in North America) is a 2001 party video game developed by Doki Denki for the PlayStation. It was released by Electronic Arts in the United States and Sony Computer Entertainment in Europe. Disney Interactive released the game on Windows.

It was released as a PlayStation Classic for the PlayStation 3 and PlayStation Portable via the PlayStation Store on 13 September 2009.

== Gameplay ==
The gameplay is similar to Nintendo's Mario Party franchise. The "Adventure" mode features Pooh and his friends going around a large board similar to that of a board game and after each turn, one of the mini-games is played.

The minigames include the Bomberman-inspired Tigger's Thunder and Frightening, Rabbit's Roller Racers, Piglet's Pumpkin Hunt, Owl's Fruit 'n' Hoot and Pooh's Pinball Party.

== Plot ==
The game begins with Pooh leaving Rabbit's house with a honey pot. After pouncing on Pooh, Tigger gets his head stuck in Pooh's pot until Pooh, Rabbit, Piglet, and Roo pull it off. They discover a piece of paper stuck on the back of Tigger's head, which Owl reveals to be a treasure map. Before they can discover where the map leads to, Gopher accidentally sticks to the map and runs away from a swarm of angry bees. Realizing that Gopher is leaving with the map, Pooh and his friends go after him.

The gang eventually catch up to Gopher and successfully pull the map off of his back but are forced to flee from a flying heffalump. After a long chase, the gang takes refuge in a cave until the heffalump disappears. With the heffalump gone, the friends continue to a cavern resembling a skull, where the treasure chest is supposed to be. As they enter the cavern, Gopher warns them that it is starting to collapse and that they will have to hurry if they want to get to the treasure chest.

After making it through the crumbling parts of the cave, the gang reach the area where the chest is, which is revealed to contain several pots of honey, much to Pooh's delight and everyone else's dismay. Later, Pooh wakes up in Rabbit's house and realizes that the entire adventure was only a dream. While leaving, Pooh tells Rabbit about his dream as the game ends.
