= Yahoo Kids =

Japanese public web portal

Yahoo! Kids
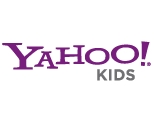
- Logo from 2009–2013

- Screenshot of Yahoo! Kids website in 2011
- Former name: Yahooligans!
- Website type: Educational; Entertainment
- Available in: English; Korean
- Owner: Yahoo!
- Launched: April 25, 1996; 30 years ago (as Yahooligans!)
- Current status: Inactive

Yahoo! Kids was a public web portal provided by Yahoo! to find age-appropriate online content for children between the ages of 4 and 13. It was available in English and in Korean.

The website is used for both educational and entertainment purposes. It was introduced in March 1996 by Yahoo! to give children a venue to find appropriate, safe Internet content. Yahoo! Kids was the oldest online search directory for children.

Yahoo! Kids was discontinued on April 30, 2013, allowing the company to redirect their resources to their mobile applications.

== History ==
A very special search site for children is Yahooligans which provides a safe environment including a search engine especially designed for children ages 8 to 14. Here is a place for even the very young to experience the web at its best.

— Susan Wehe of the Seguin Gazette on August 4, 1996

Yahooligans! was founded in March 1996 by Yahoo! to provide children with a venue to find appropriate, safe Internet content. The website was the oldest online search directory for children. The website's editors stated that Yahooligans! was "cool, goofy, fascinating, fun, hysterical, philosophical, surprising, sedate, silly, seismic, popular, obscured, useful, and interesting". In October 1999, The New York Times reporter Michelle Slatalla noted that Yahooligans! was a "heavily trafficked site", with 463,000 visitors accessing the website in August 1999. In October 1999, the website received an Alexa Internet rank of 991 out of 22 million content websites.

In 2004, Yahoo! entered into a partnership with DIC Entertainment (now WildBrain) to establish Yahooligans! TV, which gave users access to DIC's 3,000 hours of animated children programs. DIC president Brad Brooks stated that the partnership "offer[ed] advertisers a cross platform purchase". Yahoo! sold the ads and the revenue from the commercials was split between the two companies.

In December 2006, Yahooligans! was rebranded as Yahoo! Kids.

=== Closure ===
Yahoo! Kids closed on April 30, 2013. In February 2013, Yahoo! CEO Marissa Mayer told an investor conference that the company aimed to reduce their 70 products to 12, increasing their attention on mobile device applications. In an April 19, 2013, blog post announcing Yahoo! Kids' closure, Yahoo! Executive Vice president of Platforms Jay Rossiter wrote:

[W]e want to bring you experiences that inspire and entertain you every day. That means taking a hard look at all of our products to make sure they are still central to your daily habits. As part of that ongoing effort, today we are shutting down a few more products.

He said that Yahoo! would redirect those resources to newer products like e-mail and weather mobile applications.

Rossiter wrote that Yahoo!'s "youngest users" could continue using the company's services. Children younger than 13 could create a Yahoo! account through Yahoo!'s Family Accounts program. Young users could also find age-appropriate movies through the "Family Movies" section of Yahoo! Movies.

== Japan ==
Yahoo! Kids
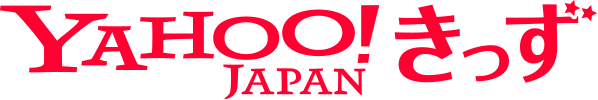
- Logo
- Native name: Yahoo!きっず
- Romanized name: Yafū kizzu
- Website type: Educational; Entertainment
- Available in: Japanese
- Owner: Yahoo! Japan with characters licensed by Sanrio
- Website: kids.yahoo.co.jp
- Current status: Active; scheduled to close on 4 December 2026

Yahoo! Japan Kids (Yahoo!きっず, Yafū kizzu) was launched in Japan in November 1997. Under the control of Yahoo! Japan and later LY Corporation, it remains active unlike its US counterpart.

In September 2026, it was announced that Yahoo! Japan Kids would shut down on December 4, 2026.

== Content ==
The website was used for both educational and entertainment purposes. The Yahoo! Kids' portal had directories such as "Around the World", "Arts & Entertainment", "Computers & Games", "School Bell", "Science & Nature", and "Sports & Recreation". Under the directory "School Bell", the category "Homework Answers" allowed children to access websites pertaining to school subjects such as geography, history, and math. Under "Around the World", children could learn about countries, politics, and history. The "Art Soup" directory taught children about museums and drama, and the "Scoop" let them look at comics and newspapers. It had an Associated Press section to let children read age-appropriate articles.

The parents' section of the website contained advice about being safe while browsing the Internet and links to services that "block and filter websites". The teachers' section contained lesson plans for "planning, implementing and assessing integrated units". It was separated into three ranks: kindergarten through second grade, third through fifth grade, and sixth to eighth grade.

Educational professionals and former teachers screened each website listed in Yahooligans. The homepage displayed links to games, jokes, news, and sports. For the latter three, the content was crafted for those younger than 12. Yahooligans! directed viewers to child-friendly websites like those from Smithsonian Institution and Louvre. It adopted the persona of Bill Clinton's pet cat, Socks, to introduce viewers to the White House's website in 1995. Games provided on the Yahoo! Kids website included Chinese checkers, Go Fish, and Checkers. Age-appropriate offsite games were also accessible via the links under the "games" tab. The website offered an instant messaging gadget that allowed children to participate in live chats with notable people, such as Bill Clinton, J. K. Rowling, and Bill Nye the Science Guy.

In March 2011, Yahoo! Kids partnered with the TV series Star Wars: The Clone Wars near the season's finale to have children pose questions to Chewbacca. Question submissions were posted on SurveyMonkey, and Yahoo! Kids posted Chewbacca's answers on March 28. The approximately three minute long video consisted of Chewbacca pantomiming responses to queries such as "How do you deal with all that hair?"

== Reviews ==
In August 1996, Greg Mefford of The Galveston Daily News (later renamed to The Daily News) stated that Yahooligans is "as much fun as it is educational, with links to darn near everything". Kokomo Tribune columnist Amy Irick wrote in January 1998 that Yahooligans! was a "great alternative to the Yahoo! search engine for younger computer users". In August 1999, Irick said that Yahooligans! was "very user friendly, just like its parent Yahoo!" and that its teachers' guide is a "must see for teachers". Indiana Gazette's John Smathers wrote in June 2002, "I can't mention kids sites without mentioning Yahooligans.com", praising the website as a "great tool to teach kids more about Internet surfing".

In June 2005, reviewer Gail Junion-Metz of the School Library Journal praised Yahooligans! Games, writing that it is "[o]ne of the best spots to find kid-appropriate games that don't require downloads". In a September 1998 review of the website, John Hilvert and Linda Bruce of PC User (now named TechLife) wrote that "Yahooligans is one of the best specialized engines, particularly for homework answers."

In July 2007, reviewer Holly Gunn of Teacher Librarian praised Yahoo! Kids for its helpful, comprehensible results but criticized it for having an interface filled with too many ads and that was "too busy and filled with too many diversions. Useful material is buried amidst entertainment".
