= Winnie the Pooh (franchise) =

Disney media franchise

- Logo used since the 2011 film
- Created by: Walt Disney Animation Studios
- Original work: Winnie the Pooh and the Honey Tree (1966)
- Owner: The Walt Disney Company
- Years: 1966–present
- Based on: Winnie-the-Pooh by: A. A. Milne; E. H. Shepard

Print publications
- Comic strip: Winnie the Pooh (1978–1988)

Films and television
- Films: Walt Disney Animation Studios; The Many Adventures of Winnie the Pooh (1977); Winnie the Pooh (2011); Non-WDAS animated films; The Tigger Movie (2000); Piglet's Big Movie (2003); Pooh's Heffalump Movie (2005); Live-action continuation; Christopher Robin (2018)
- Short films: Winnie the Pooh and the Honey Tree (1966); Winnie the Pooh and the Blustery Day (1968); Winnie the Pooh and Tigger Too (1974); Winnie the Pooh Discovers the Seasons (1981); Winnie the Pooh and a Day for Eeyore (1983)
- Television series: Welcome to Pooh Corner (1983–1986); The Book of Pooh (2001–2003)
- Animated series: The New Adventures of Winnie the Pooh (1988–1991); My Friends Tigger & Pooh (2007–2010); Playdate with Winnie the Pooh (2023–present); Me & Winnie the Pooh (2023–present)
- Television specials: Winnie the Pooh and Christmas Too (1991); Boo to You Too! Winnie the Pooh (1996); A Winnie the Pooh Thanksgiving (1998); A Valentine for You (1999)
- Direct-to-video: Pooh's Grand Adventure: The Search for Christopher Robin (1997); Seasons of Giving (1999); The Book of Pooh: Stories from the Heart (2001); A Very Merry Pooh Year (2002); Winnie the Pooh: Springtime with Roo (2004); Pooh's Heffalump Halloween Movie (2005); Super Sleuth Christmas Movie (2007); Tigger & Pooh and a Musical Too (2009); Super Duper Super Sleuths (2010)

Theatrical presentations
- Musical: Winnie the Pooh: The New Musical Adaptation (2021)

Games
- Video games: Winnie the Pooh in the Hundred Acre Wood (1986); Disney's Animated Storybook (1995, 1999); Ready to Read with Pooh (1997); Ready for Math with Pooh (1997); Winnie the Pooh: Adventures in the 100 Acre Wood (2000); Tigger's Honey Hunt (2000); Pooh's Party Games: In Search of the Treasure (2001); Piglet's Big Game (2003); Winnie the Pooh's Rumbly Tumbly Adventure (2005); Winnie the Pooh's Home Run Derby (2010)

Audio
- Soundtracks: More Songs from Pooh Corner (2000); Winnie the Pooh (2011); Christopher Robin (2018)

Miscellaneous
- Theme park attractions: The Many Adventures of Winnie the Pooh (1999–present); Pooh's Hunny Hunt (2000–present)

Winnie the Pooh is a media franchise produced by The Walt Disney Company, based on A. A. Milne and E. H. Shepard's stories featuring Winnie-the-Pooh. It started in 1966 with the theatrical release of the short Winnie the Pooh and the Honey Tree.

The tone, action, and plot of the franchise is made much softer and slower than that of any other Disney animated franchise, in order for it to appeal to a more preschool-oriented audience. It is one of the highest-grossing media franchises of all time.

== History ==
In 1930, producer Stephen Slesinger originally acquired sole and exclusive American and Canadian merchandising, television, recording and other trade rights to Pooh from A. A. Milne. Then as early as 1938, Walt Disney expressed interest in obtaining the film rights to the Pooh books by first corresponding with the literary agency Curtis Brown. In June 1961, Walt Disney Productions acquired the film rights from Milne's widow Dorothy, as well as the television and merchandising rights from Slesinger's widow Shirley Slesinger Lasswell. By 1964, Disney told his animation staff that he was planning to make a full-length animated feature film based on the books. A meeting was held with senior staff members to discuss the proposed film. However, during the meeting, Disney decided not to make a feature film, but instead a featurette that could be attached to a live-action film. Disney dropped the hyphens from the name and adopted Slesinger's red-shirted version of Pooh. To Milne's set of characters, Disney added Gopher to add a more traditional and relatable American creature to the mix. Winnie the Pooh and the Honey Tree in 1966 was the first film in the series and the only to be released before Disney's death the same year.

A new rights agreement was signed in 1983 between Disney and the heirs of both Milne and Slesinger. In 1991, Slesinger Lasswell began a series of lawsuits against Disney for unpaid royalties, accusing the company of misreporting Pooh revenue, and sought to terminate all future rights. Then after the Copyright Term Extension Act of 1998 was passed, A. A. Milne's granddaughter Clare attempted to use the new law to terminate all future rights for the Slesingers so the Milnes could deal with Disney exclusively, but this was rejected by the US courts. In the midst of the lawsuits, analysts in 2003 believed Pooh was worth $3 billion to $6 billion of Disney's total annual sales of $25 billion. The Age thus concluded, "[l]osing control of the Winnie the Pooh franchise would be a disaster for Disney". In 2009, US District Judge Florence-Marie Cooper ruled that the Slesingers had granted all Pooh trademarks and copyrights to Disney, but Disney must still pay royalties for all future uses of the characters. By 2022, the original Winnie-the-Pooh book entered into the public domain in the United States, since it had been 95 years since the story was first published. While Disney retains certain rights to their derivative works, the company no longer holds exclusive rights to the characters in the US. Disney still holds exclusive rights in the UK and other countries where they have different copyright expiration dates.

According to a 2013 Variety article, Winnie the Pooh is the third best-selling franchise in the world, after Disney's own Disney Princess and Star Wars. The New York Times said: "The stakes are high for Disney. Global sales of Pooh merchandise — books, plush toys, T-shirts, potty chairs — have fallen 12% over the last five years, but still account for a staggering $5.5 billion." It added that Pooh "remains Disney's second best-selling character after Mickey Mouse" and noted: "Branding experts say aging character franchises are among the most difficult to keep alive because they require continually walking a tightrope. 'With Winnie the Pooh, Disney is going to continue to struggle with the tension of remaining relevant to kids versus maintaining a love-mark brand that parents trust,' said Matt Britton, a founder of Mr. Youth, a New York marketing firm." In a 2014 overview of Disney's top franchises, CNN wrote "Pooh may have been born in the 1920s in A.A. Milne's books. But the bear is still going strong via Disney movies and DVD's. Pooh Bear sells games, stuffed animals, clothing, and even iPhone and iPad apps. Pooh is also a favorite subject in books from Disney Publishing Worldwide, the world's largest publisher of children's books and magazines with more than 700 million products sold each year".

== Films ==
=== Feature films ===
Crew/detail	Animated films					Live-action film
Crew/detail	The Many Adventures of Winnie the Pooh (1977)	The Tigger Movie (2000)	Piglet's Big Movie (2003)	Pooh's Heffalump Movie (2005)	Winnie the Pooh (2011)	Christopher Robin (2018)
Director(s)	John Lounsbery; Wolfgang Reitherman	Jun Falkenstein	Francis Glebas	Frank Nissen	Stephen Anderson; Don Hall	Marc Forster
Producer(s)	Wolfgang Reitherman; Walt Disney (uncredited)	Cheryl Abood; Jennifer Blohm; Richmond Homie	Michelle Pappalardo-Robinson	Jessica Koplos-Miller	Peter Del Vecho; Clark Spencer	Brigham Taylor; Kristen Burr
Writer(s)	Story by: Larry Clemmons; Ralph Wright; Vance Gerry; Xavier Atencio; Ken Anderson; Julius Svensden; Ted Berman; Eric Cleworth	Screenplay by: Jun Falkenstein; Story by: Eddie Guzelian	Screenplay by: Brian Hohlfeld	Screenplay by: Brian Hohlfeld; Evan Spiliotopoulos	Story by: Burny Mattinson; Stephen Anderson; Clio Chiang; Don Dougherty; Don Hall; Kendelle Boyer; Brian Kesinger; Nicole Mitchell; Jeremy Spears	Screenplay by: Tom McCarthy; Alex Ross Perry; Allison Schroeder; Story by: Greg Brooker; Mark Steven Johnson
Composer(s)	Richard M. Sherman; Robert B. Sherman; Buddy Baker	Harry Gregson-Williams	Carl Johnson	Joel McNeely	Henry Jackman	Jon Brion; Geoff Zanelli
Editor(s)	Tom Acosta; James Melton	Makoto Arai; Robert Fisher, Jr.	Ivan Bilancio	Robert Fisher Jr. Nancy Frazen; Anthony F. Rocco	Lisa Linder	Matt Chessé
Production companies	Walt Disney Productions	Walt Disney Pictures; Walt Disney Television Animation	Walt Disney Pictures; Disneytoon Studios	Walt Disney Pictures; Disneytoon Studios	Walt Disney Pictures; Walt Disney Animation Studios	Walt Disney Pictures; 2DUX^{2}
Distributor	Buena Vista Distribution	Buena Vista Distribution	Buena Vista Distribution	Buena Vista Distribution	Walt Disney Studios Motion Pictures	Walt Disney Studios Motion Pictures
Runtime	74 minutes	77 minutes	75 minutes	68 minutes	63 minutes	104 minutes
Released	March 11, 1977	February 11, 2000	March 21, 2003	February 11, 2005	July 15, 2011	August 3, 2018

==== Animated feature films ====
===== The Many Adventures of Winnie the Pooh (1977) =====
The Many Adventures of Winnie the Pooh is a 1977 American animated musical comedy film produced by Walt Disney Productions and distributed by Buena Vista Distribution. The film consists of three previously released shorts that have been edited together. The ending scene is based on the final chapter of A. A. Milne's The House at Pooh Corner.

Sebastian Cabot narrates the adventures of joyous bear Winnie the Pooh as he seeks out and deals with complications from his search for honey, weathers a terrible wind storm and subsequent flood, endures the foibles of the hyperactive tiger Tigger, and celebrates Eeyore's birthday. Winnie the Pooh, Piglet, Eeyore, Kanga, Roo, and Tigger round out the menagerie in a 1977 American comedy film.

Sterling Holloway voices Pooh, one in many characters he is associated with.

===== The Tigger Movie (2000) =====
The Tigger Movie is a 2000 American animated musical comedy drama film co-written and directed by Jun Falkenstein. Part of the Winnie-the-Pooh series, this film features the rambunctious tiger Tigger in his search for his family tree and other Tiggers like himself. The film was the first feature-length theatrical Pooh film to not be a collection of previously released shorts.

Winnie the Pooh, Piglet, Owl, Kanga, Roo, and Rabbit are preparing a suitable winter home for Eeyore, the perennially dejected donkey, but Tigger's continual bouncing interrupts their efforts. Rabbit suggests Tigger go find others of his kind to bounce with, but Tigger thinks "the most wonderful thing about tiggers is" he's "the only one!" Just in case though, the joyous tiger sets out to see if he can find relatives.

===== Piglet's Big Movie (2003) =====
Piglet's Big Movie is a 2003 American animated musical adventure comedy-drama film produced by Disneytoon Studios, and released by Walt Disney Pictures on March 21, 2003. It is based upon the characters in the Winnie-the-Pooh books written by A. A. Milne. It is the second in the series of theatrically released Winnie the Pooh films which were not produced by Walt Disney Feature Animation, preceded by The Tigger Movie (2000) and followed by Pooh's Heffalump Movie (2005). The film features songs by Carly Simon.

Piglet becomes fed up after being excluded from a honey-thieving scheme, so strikes out on his own to do some thinking. But when the inhabitants in the Hundred Acre Wood discover he's missing, the only clue they have to go on is a scrapbook he left behind.

===== Pooh's Heffalump Movie (2005) =====
Pooh's Heffalump Movie is a 2005 American animated musical comedy film produced by Disneytoon Studios and released by Walt Disney Pictures, featuring characters from A. A. Milne's classic stories. This film features songs by Carly Simon.

Winnie the Pooh, Piglet, Tigger and Roo search for a mysterious and fearsome creature that has entered the Hundred Acre Wood, but Roo discovers that the creature is not what it seems.

===== Winnie the Pooh (2011) =====
Winnie the Pooh is a 2011 American animated musical comedy film produced by Walt Disney Animation Studios and released by Walt Disney Pictures. Inspired by A. A. Milne's stories of the same name, the film is part of Disney's Winnie the Pooh franchise, the fifth theatrical Winnie the Pooh film released, and Walt Disney Animation Studios' second adaptation of Winnie-the-Pooh stories.

Upon learning that Eeyore has lost his tail, the residents of the Hundred Acre Wood start a contest to see who can find a new one for the melancholy donkey — with a pot of honey going to the winner. Amid the goings-on, Owl mistakenly relates the news that Christopher Robin has been abducted by a monster called The Backson.

==== Live-action/animated feature films ====
===== Christopher Robin (2018) =====
A live-action movie and contribution based on A. A. Milne's Winnie-the-Pooh stories and characters titled Christopher Robin, directed by Marc Forster and written by Alex Ross Perry, Tom McCarthy and Allison Schroeder. The film centers on an adult Christopher Robin, who returns to the Hundred Acre Wood to spend time with Pooh and the gang. Ewan McGregor stars as the title character and Hayley Atwell as Robin's wife Evelyn. Jim Cummings reprises his voice roles of Winnie the Pooh and Tigger, Brad Garrett and Nick Mohammed respectively voice Eeyore and Piglet, and Sophie Okonedo, Peter Capaldi and Toby Jones respectively voice Kanga, Rabbit and Owl. The film was released on August 3, 2018.

===== Winnie the Pooh in the City =====
On April 14, 2026, Cummings announced that a new live-action movie is in the works releasing in December 2027.

=== Direct-to-video films ===
Role	Film								
Role	Pooh's Grand Adventure: The Search for Christopher Robin (1997)	Seasons of Giving (1999)	The Book of Pooh: Stories from the Heart (2001)	A Very Merry Pooh Year (2002)	Winnie the Pooh: Springtime with Roo (2004)	Pooh's Heffalump Halloween Movie (2005)	Super Sleuth Christmas Movie (2007)	Tigger & Pooh and a Musical Too (2009)	Super Duper Super Sleuths (2010)
Director(s)	Karl Geurs	Harry Arends; Jun Falkenstein; Karl Geurs	Mitchell Kriegman; Dean Gordon; Additional material: Mitchell Kriegman	Gary Katona; Ed Wexler; Jamie Mitchell; Ken Kessel	Elliot M. Bour; Saul Andrew Blinkoff	Elliot M. Bour; Saul Andrew Blinkoff	Don MacKinnon; David Hartman	Don MacKinnon; David Hartman	Don MacKinnon; David Hartman
Producer(s)	Karl Geurs; Gina Shay	Harry Arends; Karl Geurs; Barbara Ferro; Ken Tsumura	Robin Seidon	Gary Katona; Ed Wexler; Antran Manoogian; Jamie Mitchell; Ken Kessel	John A. Smith	John A. Smith	Dorothy McKim	Dorothy McKim	Dorothy McKim
Writer(s)	Carter Crocker; Karl Geurs	Barbara Slade	Mitchell Kriegman; Andy Yerkes; Jymn Magon; Claudia Silver; Mark Zaslove; Additional material: Mitchell Kriegman; Andy Yerkes	Karl Geurs; Ted Henning; Mark Zaslove; Brian Hohlfeld	Tom Rogers	Evan Spiliotopoulos; Brian Hohlfeld	Story by: Nicole Dubuc; Jeff Kline; Brian Hohlfeld; Screenplay by: Nicole Dubuc; Brian Hohlfeld	Story by: Brian Hohlfeld; Screenplay by: Dean Stefan; Nicole Dubuc; Brian Hohlfeld	Kim Beyer-Johnson
Production companies	Walt Disney Television Animation	Walt Disney Television Animation	Playhouse Disney Original; Shadow Projects	Walt Disney Pictures; Walt Disney Television Animation	Walt Disney Pictures; DisneyToon Studios	Walt Disney Pictures; DisneyToon Studios	Disney Television Animation	Disney Television Animation	Disney Television Animation
Distributor	Walt Disney Studios Home Entertainment	Walt Disney Studios Home Entertainment	Walt Disney Studios Home Entertainment	Walt Disney Studios Home Entertainment	Walt Disney Studios Home Entertainment	Walt Disney Studios Home Entertainment	Walt Disney Studios Home Entertainment	Walt Disney Studios Home Entertainment	Walt Disney Studios Home Entertainment
Runtime	76 minutes	70 minutes	76 minutes	70 minutes	65 minutes	67 minutes	43 minutes	60 minutes	70 minutes
Released	August 5, 1997	November 9, 1999	July 17, 2001	November 12, 2002	March 9, 2004	September 13, 2005	November 20, 2007	April 7, 2009	April 6, 2010

==== Pooh's Grand Adventure: The Search for Christopher Robin (1997) ====
Pooh's Grand Adventure: The Search for Christopher Robin is a 1997 American direct-to-video animated musical adventure comedy-drama film co-written, co-produced, and directed by Karl Geurs. The film follows Winnie the Pooh and his friends on a journey to find and rescue their friend Christopher Robin from the skull. Along the way, the group confront their own insecurities throughout the search, facing and conquering them in a series of events where they are forced to act beyond their own known limits, thus discovering their true potential. Unlike the film's predecessors, this film is an entirely original story, not based on any of A. A. Milne's classic stories.

It's time for Christopher Robin to go to school, which means he's unable to keep regularly visiting with Winnie the Pooh. But when the gang misreads a letter from Christopher, they think their friend has been snatched and taken to a faraway land by the mysterious "Skullasaurus". Along with Tigger, Piglet, Eeyore and Rabbit, Pooh journeys to the terrifying place to rescue their friend, meeting many frightening obstacles along the way as the group deals with their own insecurities in a coming of age story.

==== Seasons of Giving (1999) ====
Seasons of Giving is a 1999 American direct-to-video Christmas animated musical film that included A Winnie the Pooh Thanksgiving, and the two episodes from The New Adventures of Winnie the Pooh (Groundpiglet Day and Find Her, Keep Her) (these episodes take place during the first two seasons). It features new songs by The Sherman Brothers.

==== The Book of Pooh: Stories from the Heart (2001) ====
The Book of Pooh: Stories from the Heart is a 2001 American direct-to-video film released on DVD and VHS on July 17, 2001.

A compilation film made up of footage from the Disney Channel/Playhouse Disney television series The Book of Pooh: it contains six episodes; each focusing on one character; wrapped together by a loose plot in which the characters are in Christopher Robin's room waiting for his arrival. (As is typical with the series, each episode features an original musical number.)

==== A Very Merry Pooh Year (2002) ====
A Very Merry Pooh Year is a 2002 American direct-to-video Christmas animated musical film produced by Walt Disney Television Animation. The film features the 1991 Christmas television special Winnie the Pooh and Christmas Too, as well as a new film, Happy Pooh Year. The film animation production was done by Wang Film Productions Co., Ltd., and Sunwoo Animation, (Korea) Co., Ltd.

This was the only Winnie the Pooh film where Jeff Bennett provided Christopher Robin's singing voice. It was also the first Winnie the Pooh film where Owl does not appear at all, and the first Winnie the Pooh film that Carly Simon is involved in the soundtrack.

Pooh and Friends celebrate Christmas in the Hundred Acre Wood, after that the countdown to the New Year begins while Rabbit succumbs to a case of the winter blues. Seeing the change in their newly grumpy friend, the residents of the Hundred Acre Wood decide on some New Year's resolutions that result in drastic changes.

==== Winnie the Pooh: Springtime with Roo (2004) ====
Springtime with Roo (also known as Winnie the Pooh: Springtime with Roo) is a 2004 American animated direct-to-video Easter musical fantasy adventure comedy-drama film produced by DisneyToon Studios for Walt Disney Pictures, and animated by Toon City Animation in Manila, Philippines.

The film features the characters from Disney's Winnie the Pooh franchise, based on the original characters from the books by A. A. Milne and E. H. Shepard. The story is loosely based on Charles Dickens' 1843 novella A Christmas Carol.

Unlike the previous Winnie the Pooh direct-to-video animated films A Very Merry Pooh Year and Seasons of Giving, Springtime with Roo does not reuse any footage or episodes from the animated television series, The New Adventures of Winnie the Pooh.

Roo gets excited about Easter, however, Rabbit instead declares the day "Spring Cleaning Day", hurt over when Tigger usurped him as leader of Easter the previous year.

==== Pooh's Heffalump Halloween Movie (2005) ====
Pooh's Heffalump Halloween Movie (also known as Pooh's Heffalump Halloween: The Movie) is a 2005 American animated direct-to-video Halloween fantasy adventure comedy-drama film produced by DisneyToon Studios and released by Walt Disney Pictures, featuring the characters from Disney's Winnie the Pooh franchise, based on the original characters from the books by A. A. Milne. The sequel to Pooh's Heffalump Movie, this was the final Winnie the Pooh film to be produced by DisneyToon Studios before they moved to Tinker Bell films. This release incorporates the short film Boo to You Too! Winnie the Pooh into the storyline.

The film marked voice actor John Fiedler's final appearance as Piglet, as he died before completing his voice work (two and a half shorty months before the film's release). Upon Fiedler's death, Travis Oates was brought in to finish the remaining scenes (and received credit for "additional voices") and became Piglet's new official voice actor.

It was followed in the Winnie the Pooh animated film series by a television film, Pooh's Super Sleuth Christmas Movie, in 2007, based on the animated television series, My Friends Tigger & Pooh.

On their first Halloween together, Roo and Lumpy gather the courage to search for the Gobloon, a creature that can turn victims into Jack-O-Lanterns, but grant wishes if capture.

==== Super Sleuth Christmas Movie (2007) ====
Super Sleuth Christmas Movie is a 2007 American Christmas-themed featurette film directed by Don MacKinnon and David Hartman, based on the hit Playhouse Disney series My Friends Tigger & Pooh. The first film in the series, the film was released direct-to-video on November 20, 2007, and first aired on Playhouse Disney on December 6, 2008.

Darby, Pooh, Tigger, and their friends work together to rescue Santa's lost reindeer-trainee, Holly.

==== Tigger & Pooh and a Musical Too (2009) ====
Tigger & Pooh and a Musical Too is a 2009 American animated direct-to-video musical film produced by Walt Disney Television Animation. The film is based on the hit Playhouse Disney series My Friends Tigger & Pooh. The second film of the series, it was released on DVD on April 7, 2009, and first aired on Playhouse Disney less than a week later on April 11. Unlike the Super Sleuth Christmas Movie, it was treated more like a regular film than as part of the series.

Rabbit creates many new rules as the Mayor of the Hundred Acre Wood, leading Tigger to challenge him for mayorship and causing a Big White Line to be drawn, dividing the place.

==== Super Duper Super Sleuths (2010) ====
Super Duper Super Sleuths is a 2010 American animated direct-to-video musical film produced by Walt Disney Television Animation. The film is based on the hit Playhouse Disney series My Friends Tigger & Pooh. The third film of the series, it was released on DVD on April 6, 2010,

Darby, Pooh, Tigger and Buster become superheroes after a magic shooting star/space rock from Outer Space makes Rabbit's vegetables grow giant and get superpowers.

== Short films, specials, and featurettes ==
=== Winnie the Pooh and the Honey Tree ===
Winnie the Pooh and the Honey Tree is a 1966 animated featurette. It was released theatrically by Buena Vista Distribution Company on February 4, 1966, with The Ugly Dachshund. Based on the first two chapters of the book Winnie-the-Pooh by A. A. Milne, it is the only Winnie the Pooh production released under Walt Disney's supervision before his death in December 1966. It was later added as a segment to the March 1977 film The Many Adventures of Winnie the Pooh. Music and lyrics were written by the Sherman Brothers (Richard M. Sherman and Robert B. Sherman). Background music was provided by Buddy Baker.

Hungry for honey, Winnie-the-Pooh attempts to raid a beehive in a tall tree. After failing, he goes to Rabbit's house and eats all of his honey, making him too chubby to leave when he's stuck in Rabbit's entryway.

=== Winnie the Pooh and the Blustery Day ===
Winnie the Pooh and the Blustery Day is a 1968 animated featurette based on the third, fifth, ninth and tenth chapters of the Winnie-the-Pooh book and the second, eighth and ninth chapters from The House at Pooh Corner by A. A. Milne. The featurette was produced by Walt Disney Productions and released theatrically by Buena Vista Distribution Company on December 20, 1968, with The Horse in the Gray Flannel Suit. This was the second of the studio's Winnie the Pooh shorts. It was later added as a segment to the March 1977 film The Many Adventures of Winnie the Pooh. The music was written by Richard M. Sherman and Robert B. Sherman. It was notable for being the last animated short produced by Walt Disney, who died during its production. He posthumously won the Academy Award for Best Animated Short Film.

Winnie-the-Pooh and his friends experience high winds, heavy rains, and a flood in Hundred Acre Wood.

=== Winnie the Pooh and Tigger Too ===
Winnie the Pooh and Tigger Too is a 1974 animated featurette released theatrically by Buena Vista Distribution Company on December 20, 1974, with The Island at the Top of the World. It was nominated for an Academy Award for Best Animated Short Film, but lost to Closed Mondays. It was later added as a segment to the 1977 film The Many Adventures of Winnie the Pooh. A soundtrack album was released simultaneously and featured such songs as "The Honey Tree" and "Birthday, Birthday". The film, whose name is a play on the slogan "Tippecanoe and Tyler too" made famous during the 1840 United States presidential election, is based on the fourth and seventh chapters of The House at Pooh Corner, and as well as the third chapter of the book Winnie-the-Pooh.

Rabbit is tired of Tigger always bouncing him, so he gets Pooh and Piglet together to come up with an idea to get the bounce out of Tigger. Then, Tigger and little Roo go out for a bounce and get caught in a tree.

=== Winnie the Pooh Discovers the Seasons ===
Winnie the Pooh Discovers the Seasons is a short film made by Walt Disney Productions' educational media division, released on September 6, 1981.

=== Winnie the Pooh and a Day for Eeyore ===
Winnie the Pooh and a Day for Eeyore is a 1983 animated featurette theatrically released by Buena Vista Distribution Company on March 11, 1983, with a reissue of The Sword in the Stone (1963). Based on the sixth chapter of Winnie-the-Pooh and the sixth chapter from The House at Pooh Corner. It is the fourth and final of Disney's original theatrical featurettes adapted from the Pooh books by A. A. Milne. Produced by Rick Reinert Productions, this was the first Disney animated film since the 1938 Silly Symphonies short Merbabies to be produced by an outside studio.

Eeyore thinks everyone in the Hundred Acre Wood has forgotten his birthday. When Winnie the Pooh and his friends realize their oversight, they prepare a huge celebration with chocolate cake and a birthday game.

=== Cartoon All-Stars to the Rescue ===
Cartoon All-Stars to the Rescue is an American animated drug prevention television special starring many of the popular cartoon characters from American weekday, Sunday morning, and Saturday morning television at the time of this film's release. The plot chronicles the exploits of Michael, a teenager who is using marijuana and stealing his father's beer.

=== Winnie the Pooh and Christmas Too ===
Winnie the Pooh and Christmas Too is a Christmas television special based on the television series The New Adventures of Winnie the Pooh, originally broadcast on Saturday, December 14, 1991, on ABC.

=== Boo to You Too! Winnie the Pooh ===
Boo to You Too! Winnie the Pooh is a Halloween television special based on the Saturday morning television series The New Adventures of Winnie the Pooh, originally broadcast on October 25, 1996.

=== A Winnie the Pooh Thanksgiving ===
A Winnie the Pooh Thanksgiving is a 1998 made-for-TV special featuring the voice talents of Jim Cummings, Paul Winchell, and John Fiedler. The special shows Pooh and his friends learning the true meaning of Thanksgiving.

=== A Valentine for You ===
A Valentine for You is a Valentine's Day special based on the television series The New Adventures of Winnie the Pooh as well as A. A. Milne's treasured stories, originally broadcast on February 13, 1999. This is the final role of Paul Winchell as Tigger before his retirement in 2000 and his death in 2005. It was released on DVD in 2004 and 2010. It features the same cast, musical themes, and some of the same themes as Pooh's Grand Adventure: The Search for Christopher Robin, making it an indirect follow-up.

When Christopher Robin seems to be interested in a girl, Winnie the Pooh, Piglet and their friends fear that their friend will abandon them. Convinced that a second bite from the love bug will cure him of his lovesickness, the group sets out to explore the Hundred Acre Wood in search of the mysterious "Smitten".

== TV series ==
=== Welcome to Pooh Corner ===
Welcome to Pooh Corner is a live-action/puppet television series that aired on The Disney Channel, featuring the characters from the Winnie the Pooh universe portrayed by actors in human-sized puppet suits, except Roo, who was originally a traditional puppet. The animatronic costumes used for the characters were created by Alchemy II, Inc., headed by Ken Forsse who later created the toy sensation Teddy Ruxpin. The show was first aired on April 18, 1983, the day The Disney Channel was launched.

=== The New Adventures of Winnie the Pooh ===
The New Adventures of Winnie the Pooh is an American Saturday morning children's animated television series produced by Walt Disney Television that ran from January 17, 1988, to October 26, 1991, inspired by A. A. Milne's Winnie-the-Pooh stories. It has been released on VHS and DVD.

Winnie the Pooh stars in this animated series adapted from A. A. Milne's classic children's books that depict the misadventures of Pooh and his friends. Each episode highlights the importance of cooperation and friendship as they solve the problems that come their way and embark on many epic adventures.

=== The Book of Pooh ===
The Book of Pooh is an American children's puppetry television series that aired on the Disney Channel. It is the third television series to feature the characters from the Disney franchise based on A. A. Milne's work. It premiered on January 22, 2001, and completed its run on July 8, 2003. The show is produced by Shadow Projects, and Playhouse Disney. The characters are portrayed through puppetry. Most notable is the promotion of Kessie to the main cast, after her guest role on New Adventures.

=== My Friends Tigger & Pooh ===
My Friends Tigger & Pooh is an American animated television series based on the A. A. Milne children's books. The television series features Winnie-the-Pooh and his friends, including two new characters: a brave 6-year-old red-headed girl named Darby and her dog Buster. Although Darby is the main human friend of Pooh and the gang and the leader of the Super Sleuths, Christopher Robin, now a 10-year-old boy and attended school, still appears in two episodes.

=== Playdate with Winnie the Pooh ===
On April 29, 2022, as part of the "Disney Junior Fun-Fest Showcase" presentation by Disney Branded Television at Disney's California Adventure, Disney Branded Television president Ayo Davis announced a brand new short-form musical animated prequel series from Oddbot Inc. for Disney Junior under the title Playdate with Winnie the Pooh. The series is directed by Jojo Ramos Patrick and produced by Greg Chalekian. Chris Hamilton is the executive producer on the show, and Elise Fachon is the co-executive producer under the premise of "A young Pooh as he enjoys playdates with his friends. Set long before the events of the first special, in the exciting outdoors of the Hundred Acre Wood". As opposed to previous incarnations, this is the first Winnie the Pooh project to feature child voice actors. A stop motion pilot episode aired on November 4, 2018, in which Pooh was originally voiced by Jim Cummings. In the pilot, Pooh tells us a story of how he met his friends for the first time. Stop motion was the original concept look for the series, which was discarded.

=== Me & Winnie the Pooh ===
Me & Winnie the Pooh is an animated preschool television series produced by Disney Television Animation, and a spinoff to Playdate with Winnie the Pooh. The series premiered on Disney Junior on August 18, 2023. It features vlog-style shorts where Winnie the Pooh and his friends, including Tigger, Piglet, Rabbit, Eeyore, and Kanga, share their daily adventures and activities. The format is similar to the “Me & Mickey” series but focuses on characters from the Hundred Acre Wood. The show aims to be both entertaining and educational for young children and is available for viewing on Disney Junior and Disney+.

=== Other appearances ===
- In the animated series Disney's House of Mouse, the franchise's characters make several cameo appearances throughout the series.
- In the animated series Doc McStuffins, Pooh, Christopher Robin, Tigger, Piglet and Eeyore make a guest appearance in the episode "Into the Hundred Acre Wood".

== Video games ==
=== Winnie the Pooh in the Hundred Acre Wood ===
Winnie the Pooh in the Hundred Acre Wood was a single player adventure game created by Al Lowe for Sierra On-Line.

=== Tigger's Honey Hunt ===
Tigger's Honey Hunt is a video game that was released in 2000 for the Nintendo 64, PlayStation, and Microsoft Windows. The game was developed by DokiDenki Studio a third-party developer, for Disney Interactive who published the PC version and co-released the game on home consoles through NewKidCo in North America, while the European release was published by Ubisoft. The game has a spiritual successor called "Pooh and Tigger's Hunny Safari" with much of the same story but with different mini games.

Winnie the Pooh wants to have a party but he's running low on honey. Tigger agrees to help by heading off into the forest to look for more. This adventure takes Tigger through nine different levels of friendly platform action, full of challenges like slippery ice, falling boulders, and creepy caves.

=== Winnie the Pooh: Adventures in the 100 Acre Wood ===
Winnie the Pooh: Adventures in the 100 Acre Wood is a video game that was released in 2000 for the Game Boy Color. The game was developed by NewKidCo and published by NewKidCo and Disney.

=== Pooh's Party Game: In Search of the Treasure ===
Pooh's Party Game: In Search of the Treasure (Party Time with Winnie the Pooh in Europe) is a video game released on the PlayStation and Microsoft Windows in 2001, inspired by the Mario Party series.

=== Piglet's Big Game ===
Piglet's Big Game is a 2003 action-adventure video game by Gotham Games, Disney Interactive Studios and Doki Denki Studio. The game centers around Piglet and how he tries to show how he can help. The game is based on Piglet's Big Movie.

=== Winnie the Pooh's Rumbly Tumbly Adventure ===
Winnie the Pooh's Rumbly Tumbly Adventure is an action-adventure video game of the action-adventure genre released in 2005. It was published by Ubisoft and Disney Interactive and developed by Phoenix Studio.

=== Ready to Read with Pooh ===
Ready to Read with Pooh is a Disney Interactive CD-ROM game that helps youngsters ages three to six learn to read. There are nine activities in the game. When youngsters complete an activity successfully, they will receive an item for the new treehouse that the player has "moved into".

=== Ready for Math with Pooh ===
Ready for Math with Pooh is a Disney Interactive CD-ROM game that helps youngsters ages three to six learn basic mathematical concepts. There are nine activities in the game. When an activity is completed, the player receives an item for a garden that the gang is using to cheer up Eeyore.

=== Disney Learning: Winnie the Pooh ===
Disney Learning: Winnie the Pooh consists of three sister games: Winnie the Pooh Toddler (1999), Winnie the Pooh Preschool (October 1999), Winnie the Pooh Kindergarten (2000).

=== Pooh's Hunny Trouble ===
Pooh's Hunny Trouble is a puzzle mobile game developed by Disney Mobile Studios.

=== Winnie The Pooh's Home Run Derby ===
Winnie The Pooh's Home Run Derby is a 2010 Japanese Flash baseball video game published at the Walt Disney Pictures website. The player controls Pooh in order to defeat his eight friends in a baseball match. The game won a cult following in early 2013 and became a viral hit due to its extreme difficulty.

=== Other appearances ===
- In the Kingdom Hearts series (2002–present) Winnie the Pooh is one of several Disney franchises to be represented as a world in the RPG franchise developed by Square Enix. "The 100 Acre Wood" has appeared in Kingdom Hearts, Kingdom Hearts: Chain of Memories (and its remake), Kingdom Hearts II, Kingdom Hearts Birth by Sleep, and Kingdom Hearts III, and the characters also make a minor appearance in the mobile and browser game Kingdom Hearts χ.
- Winnie the Pooh is one of the central characters in the video game Disney Friends, released in 2007 by Amaze Entertainment for the Nintendo DS, where the player can interact with him.
- In the world builder game Disney Magic Kingdoms, a limited time Event focused on Winnie the Pooh introduced some playable characters from the franchise, as well as some attractions based on locations of the film or real attractions from Disney Parks, with other characters being included in later updates of the game. In the game the characters are involved in new storylines.
- An alternate version of Tigger appears as a playable character in the video game Disney Mirrorverse.
- Disney Dreamlight Valley introduced Tigger as the first character from the franchise in 2025, with more characters to follow in later updates.

== Other ==
=== Comics ===
Winnie the Pooh is a 1978–1988 daily comic strip based on the Winnie-the-Pooh characters created by A.A. Milne in his 1920s books. The strip ran from June 19, 1978, until April 2, 1988. This is one of many Disney comic strips that have run in newspapers since 1930.

Based on the Disney adaptations of the characters, the strip was written by Don Ferguson and drawn by Richard Moore, although the feature was usually billed as "by Disney."

The strip features the full cast of Winnie the Pooh's friends: Christopher Robin, Tigger, Rabbit, Eeyore, Owl, Piglet, Kanga, and Roo.

=== Theme park attractions ===
The Many Adventures of Winnie the Pooh is a dark ride based upon the 1977 film The Many Adventures of Winnie the Pooh. The attraction exists in slightly different forms at the Magic Kingdom in the Walt Disney World Resort, Disneyland, Hong Kong Disneyland, and Shanghai Disneyland.

Pooh's Hunny Hunt, located in Tokyo Disneyland, is an entirely different "E-ticket class" attraction, featuring full audio-animatronics and an innovative 'trackless' ride system.

=== More Songs from Pooh Corner ===
More Songs from Pooh Corner is a children's music album released in 2000 by Kenny Loggins. The follow-up to his 1994 album Return to Pooh Corner, it includes the theme song from the 2000 Disney animated film The Tigger Movie, "Your Heart Will Lead You Home", which he also performed for that film's soundtrack, as well as several classic film songs and duets with Olivia Newton-John and Alison Krauss.

=== Magazine ===
Winnie the Pooh Magazine sold 1.35 million copies in Disney's fiscal year 2008 via 35 editions.

=== Musical adaptation ===
Disney Theatrical Productions adapted Winnie the Pooh franchise for a run on Broadway at the Theatre Row Building, starting on October 21, 2021.

=== Projects ===
To celebrate the 100th anniversary of Winnie the Pooh, Disney Japan is hosting a new project, with Sho Sakurai, Snow Man's Ryohei Abe, and Travis Japan's Noel Kawashima chosen as ambassadors. "Pooh Time" was launched as an initiative to provide everyone who works hard in their busy daily lives a gentle moment to "do nothing". Regarding the project and the ambassadorship, the three coincided that now, as adults, the character has changed their point of view. They see now how profound and even philosophical its presence has been, and that, in a busy–busy world, it is nice to sometimes take some time to "enjoy the moment". The project starts on October 14, 2026, Pooh's "birthday".

Two 100th anniversary projects were created in collaboration with two-time consecutive Olympic champion Yuzuru Hanyu. The first, titled "Shower of Heart", draws on the bond between Winnie the Pooh and Hanyu and features more than 100 specially produced items, including a plush toy depicting Hanyu himself sold as a set with a Winnie the Pooh plush toy. It will begin with a dedicated exhibition in Tokyo in October 2026 and, after a tour of four other cities, will conclude in Sendai in May 2027. The second, "To Pooh: Yuzuru Hanyu and Winnie the Pooh Memory Book with Dress-Up Pooh Plush Toy," includes a book about the bond between Winnie the Pooh and Hanyu and a plush toy that can be dressed up in two costumes based on those Hanyu wore when he won his second Olympic gold medal.

== Sources ==
- Poitras, Peyton (2024). Practically Pooh in Every Way: A Look at Disney's Effect on Winnie-the-Pooh Pre- and Post- Public Domain (Honors thesis). Winter Park, Florida: Rollins College.

== Bibliography ==
- Finch, Christopher (2000). Disney's Winnie the Pooh: A Celebration of the Silly Old Bear. Disney Editions. ISBN 978-0786853441.
