= Hundred Acre Wood =

Fictional forest in the Winnie-the-Pooh series

Coordinates: 51.0641°N 0.0922°E

The Hundred Acre Wood
- Winnie-the-Pooh location
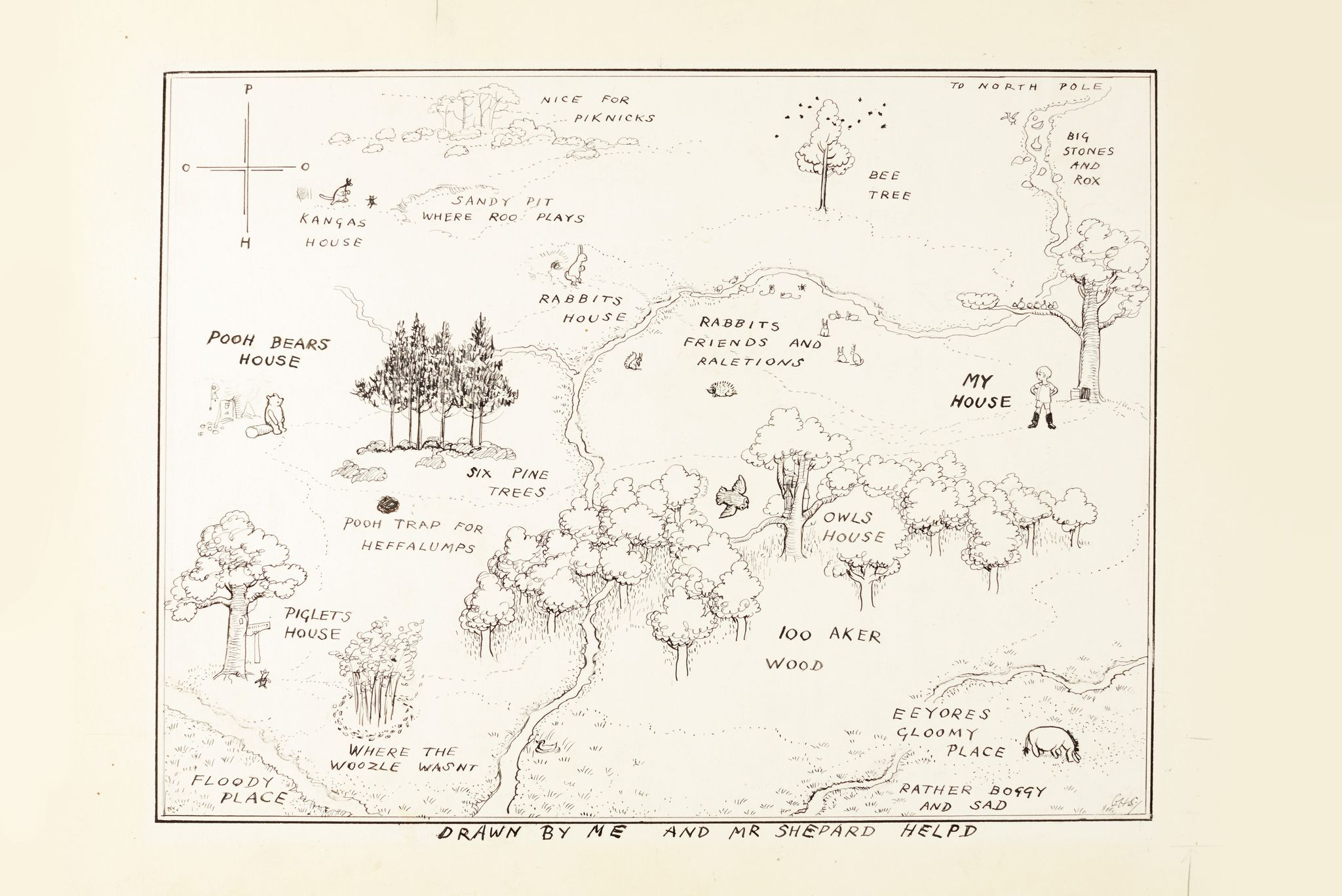
- Map of the Hundred Acre Wood drawn by E. H. Shepard to illustrate Winnie-the-Pooh.
- First appearance: When We Were Very Young (1924)
- Created by: A. A. Milne
- Genre: Children's book

In-universe information
- Type: Forest
- Locations: Owl's House, The Six Pine Trees, Galleon's Lap
- Characters: Winnie-the-Pooh, Tigger, (full list)

The Hundred Acre Wood (also spelled as 100 Aker Wood, Hundred-Acre Wood, and 100 Acre Wood; also known as simply "The Wood") is a part of the fictional land inhabited by Winnie-the-Pooh and his friends in the Winnie-the-Pooh series of children's stories by author A. A. Milne. The wood is visited regularly by the young boy Christopher Robin, who accompanies Pooh and company on their many adventures.

In A. A. Milne's books, the term "Hundred Acre Wood" is actually used for a specific part of the larger Forest, centred on Owl's house (see the map in the book, as well as numerous references in the text to the characters going "into" or "out of" the Hundred Acre Wood as they go between Owl's house and other Forest locations). However, in most of the adaptations, and in general conversation with most Pooh fans, "The Hundred Acre Wood" is used for the entire world of Winnie-the-Pooh, the Forest and all the places it contains.

The Hundred Acre Wood of the Winnie-the-Pooh stories was inspired by Five Hundred Acre Wood in Ashdown Forest in East Sussex, England. A. A. Milne's country home at Cotchford Farm, Hartfield was situated north of Ashdown Forest, and Five Hundred Acre Wood is a dense beech wood that Christopher Robin Milne would explore on his way from Cotchford Farm onto the Forest. Five Hundred Acre Wood is long-established, having been originally sold off from the Forest in 1678. The wood is part of the Buckhurst Park estate, is privately owned, and is not therefore accessible to the public. Two footpaths, including the Wealdway, cross through the wood and are available for public use.

Milne was inspired by the landscape of Ashdown Forest to use it as the setting for his Winnie-the-Pooh stories, and many features from the stories can be identified with specific locations in the forest. The car park at the hilltop of Gills Lap (the Galleon's Lap of the Pooh stories) in Ashdown Forest, (grid reference TQ 467 315), contains a display panel with a map of the surrounding area and the features from several of the Winnie-the-Pooh stories marked on it. Five Hundred Acre Wood lies a short distance to the north-east, while the "Enchanted Place" is a small wooded area 660 feet (200 m) to the north. A memorial plaque dedicated to A. A. Milne and his illustrator, Ernest H. Shepard, lies 330 feet (100 m) away. Five Hundred Acre Wood lies a short distance to the north-east.

== Places in the Wood ==
The following places are shown on Ernest H. Shepard's map at the beginning of the Winnie-the-Pooh book:

- Pooh Bear's House
- Kanga's House
- The Sandy Pit Where Roo Plays
- A Nice Place for Picnics
- The Bee Tree
- The way to the North Pole
- An area with Big Stones and Rocks
- Rabbit's House
- An area for Rabbit's Friends-and-Relations
- Christopher Robin's House
- The Six Pine Trees
- The Pooh Trap for Heffalumps
- Piglet's House
- Where the Woozle Wasn't
- A Floody Place
- Owl's House
- Eeyore's Gloomy Place

Additional places mentioned and shown in the books, but not shown on the map include:

- The House at Pooh Corner
- The Poohsticks Bridge
- The Stepping Stones
- A Gravel Pit
- Pooh's Thoughtful Spot
- Galleon's Lap
- Tigger’s house (Disney materials only)

== Residents of the Wood ==
=== Original Milne books ===
- Christopher Robin
- Eeyore
- Heffalumps
- Kanga
- Owl
- Piglet
- Rabbit
- Roo
- Tigger
- Winnie-the-Pooh

=== Disney materials only ===
- Beaver
- Buster
- Darby
- Gopher
- Stan
- Heff
- Wooster
- Kessie
- Lumpy
- Porcupine
- Raccoon
- Skunk
- Squirrels
- Turtle
- Woodpecker

=== Other works ===
- Lottie

== In other media ==
The Hundred Acre Wood appears as a recurring location in the Kingdom Hearts video game series, where it is located in a book owned by Merlin. The Hundred Acre Wood does not have any enemies, with its gameplay largely consisting of minigames. Introduced in Kingdom Hearts (2002), the Hundred Acre Wood makes subsequent appearances in Kingdom Hearts: Chain of Memories (2004), Kingdom Hearts II (2005), Kingdom Hearts Birth by Sleep (2009), and Kingdom Hearts III (2019).

=== The Twisted Childhood Universe ===
The Hundred Acre Wood is featured in The Twisted Childhood Universe.

- In Winnie-the-Pooh: Blood and Honey (2023), the inhabitants of the Hundred Acre Wood suffer from a famine shortly after Christopher Robin leaves for college. Pooh, Piglet, Owl and Rabbit consume Eeyore to survive, although the trauma causes them to revert to their animalistic instincts and develop a hatred towards Christopher and the rest of humanity. They begin committing murderous acts towards anyone who stumbles upon the woods.
- In Winnie-the-Pooh: Blood and Honey 2 (2024), the Hundred Acre Wood makes a return, while also highlighting the origins of Pooh and his friends. They are revealed to be kidnapped children who were experimented on by a mad scientist before having their bodies buried in the woods, only for them to resurrect as feral creatures.
