= Kanga (Winnie-the-Pooh) =

Character in Winnie-the-Pooh

- Winnie-the-Pooh character
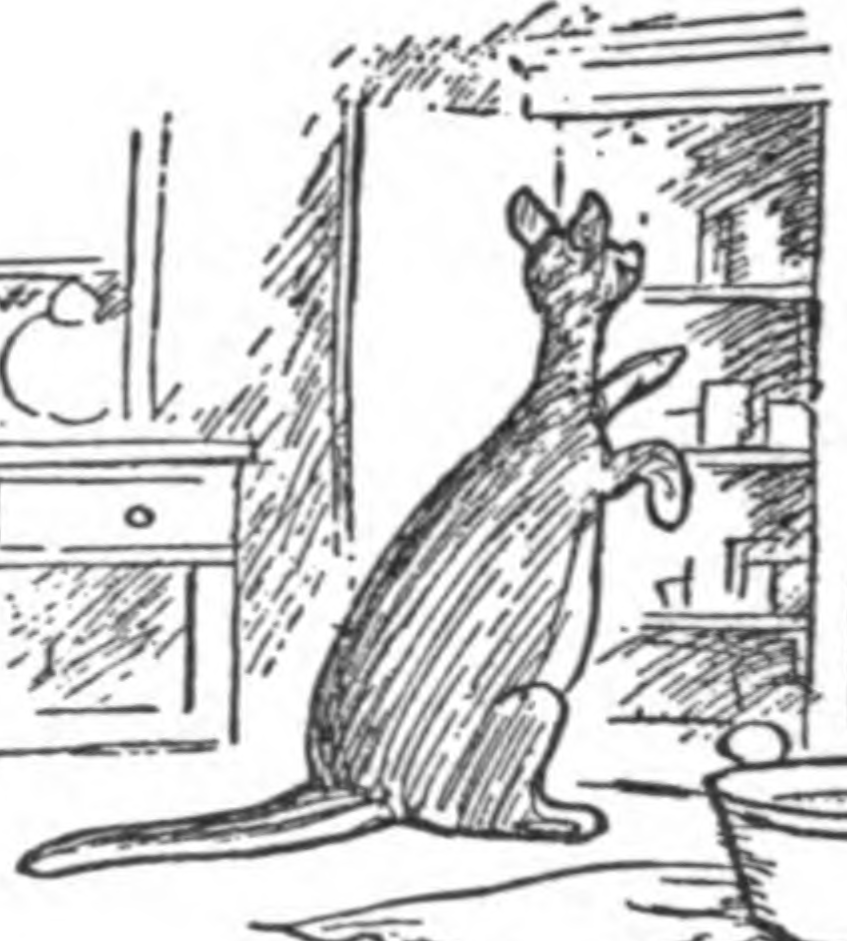
- Illustration by Ernest Howard Shepard from Winnie-the-Pooh (1926)
- First appearance: Winnie-the-Pooh (1926)
- Created by: A. A. Milne

In-universe information
- Species: Kangaroo
- Gender: Female
- Family: Roo (son)

Kanga is a character in A. A. Milne's books Winnie-the-Pooh (1926) and The House at Pooh Corner (1928). A female kangaroo and the mother of Roo, she is the only female character in Milne's Pooh books. Kanga and Roo are the only pair of animals of the same species in the books, and their close relationship is emphasized by their combined names ("Kanga-Roo"). The maternal instinct is evident not only in Kanga's desire to always keep Roo close to her in her pouch but also in her willingness to adopt the newly arrived Tigger. This trio forms a group of "Strange Animals" that is ultimately welcomed by the other inhabitants of the Forest.

== Origin ==
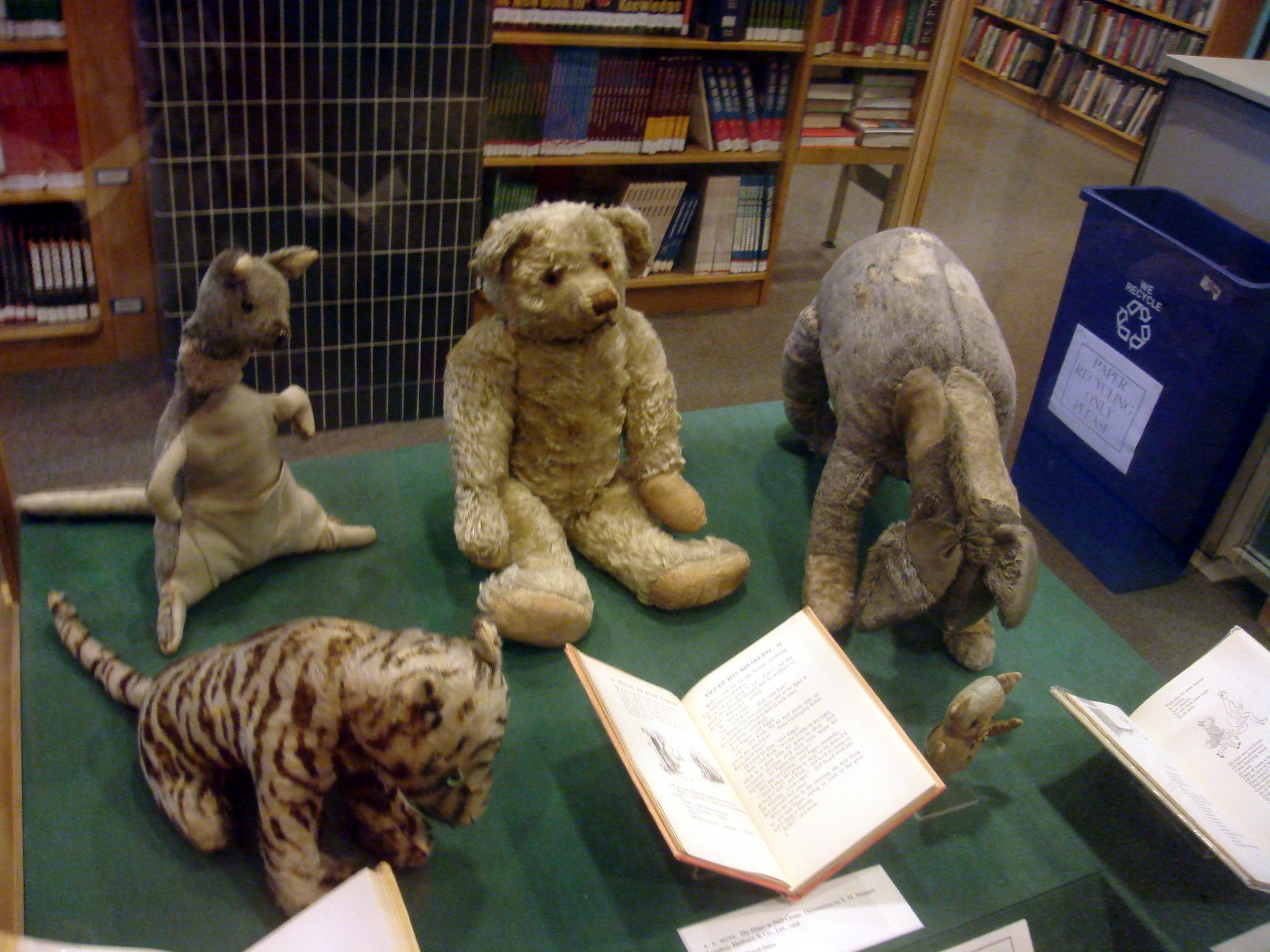
The original toys

Like many other characters in the Winnie-the-Pooh books, Kanga is associated with a stuffed toy that was an early childhood present to Milne's son, Christopher Robin Milne. Milne himself noted that after his son got a bear (the future Winnie-the-Pooh), a donkey (Eeyore), and a piglet (Piglet), gifted to him on separate occasions by different people, the tiger (Tigger) and kangaroo were acquired "not just for the delight they might give to their new owner, but also for their literary possibilities".

Most critics agree that Kanga reflects the British nanny type, possibly the "Nanny" described in Christopher Milne's autobiography, The Enchanted Places.

== Profile ==
Like other characters in the Milne's children books, Kanga is portrayed in an "impressionist" manner: a dominant trait is defined early and refined in a one-dimensional way. Kanga always stays motherly as the story unfolds, just like Tigger keeps being bouncy. The choice of animal assists in this unidimensional development of a character, with real-life female kangaroo protecting an offspring for months after birth literally within her body. Along with Rabbit, Eeyore, and Owl, Kanga is one of the four "staid" adult characters, in contrast to the adolescent Tigger (who still need a mother's firm hand, lent by Kanga), baby Roo, and somewhere-in-between Pooh and Piglet. Yarbrough considers her to be the only "adult" in the forest. Despite her staid appearance, however, Kanga fully participates in the nonsensical humor and physicality of the stories, Pooh is envious of her jumping.

Motherly role of Kanga is evident in her behavior towards other characters: unlike the wise Owl's, her concerns are purely practical, for example, she chastises Owl for the mess he made in his house. In her complete devotion to family affairs (a trait quite foreign to Rabbit), she often goes far, using the only punishments in the books: she forcefully bathes Piglet for pretending to be Roo and justifies forced medicine by insultingly warning him that he does not want to grow up "small and weak like Piglet" (later adapted in Piglet's Big Movie with the song "Mother's Intuition"). Christopher Robin considers her to be one of the "Fiercer Animals". Piglet seconds, "if One of the Fiercer Animal is Deprived of Its Young, it becomes as fierce as Two of the Fiercer Animals".

Kanga, like Tigger, is an outsider not quite fitting in with the rest of the forest crowd.

== Adaptations ==
In 1960, His Master's Voice recorded a dramatised version with songs (music by Harold Fraser-Simson) of two episodes from The House at Pooh Corner, with Rosemary Adam as Kanga, which was released on a 45 rpm EP.

The Royal Mint minted Kanga and Roo onto 50p coins in 2022, as part of a Winnie-the-Pooh collection.

Kanga appears as a regular character in the Winnie the Pooh media franchise created by the Walt Disney Company, first appearing in the 1966 featurette Winnie the Pooh and the Honey Tree.

== Sources ==
- Connolly, Paula T. (1995). Winnie-the-Pooh and The House at Pooh Corner. New York, NY: Macmillan Reference USA. ISBN 978-0-8057-8810-5.
- Finch, Christopher (2000). Disney's Winnie the Pooh: a celebration of the silly old bear (1st ed.). New York: Disney Editions. ISBN 0786863528.
- Nelson, Marie W. (December 1971). "Characterization in the Children's Books of A. A. Milne" (PDF). The Savannah State College Bulletin. 25 (2). Savannah, Georgia: Savannah State College.
- Poitras, Peyton (2024). Practically Pooh in Every Way: A Look at Disney's Effect on Winnie-the-Pooh Pre- and Post- Public Domain (Honors thesis). Winter Park, Florida: Rollins College.
- Stanger, Carol A. (1987). "Winnie The Pooh Through a Feminist Lens". The Lion and the Unicorn. 11 (2): 34–50. doi:10.1353/uni.0.0299. ISSN 1080-6563.
- Yarbrough, W.W. (2011). Masculinity in Children's Animal Stories, 1888-1928: A Critical Study of Anthropomorphic Tales by Wilde, Kipling, Potter, Grahame and Milne. McFarland, Incorporated, Publishers. ISBN 978-0-7864-8554-3.
