= Rabbit (Winnie-the-Pooh) =

- Winnie-the-Pooh character
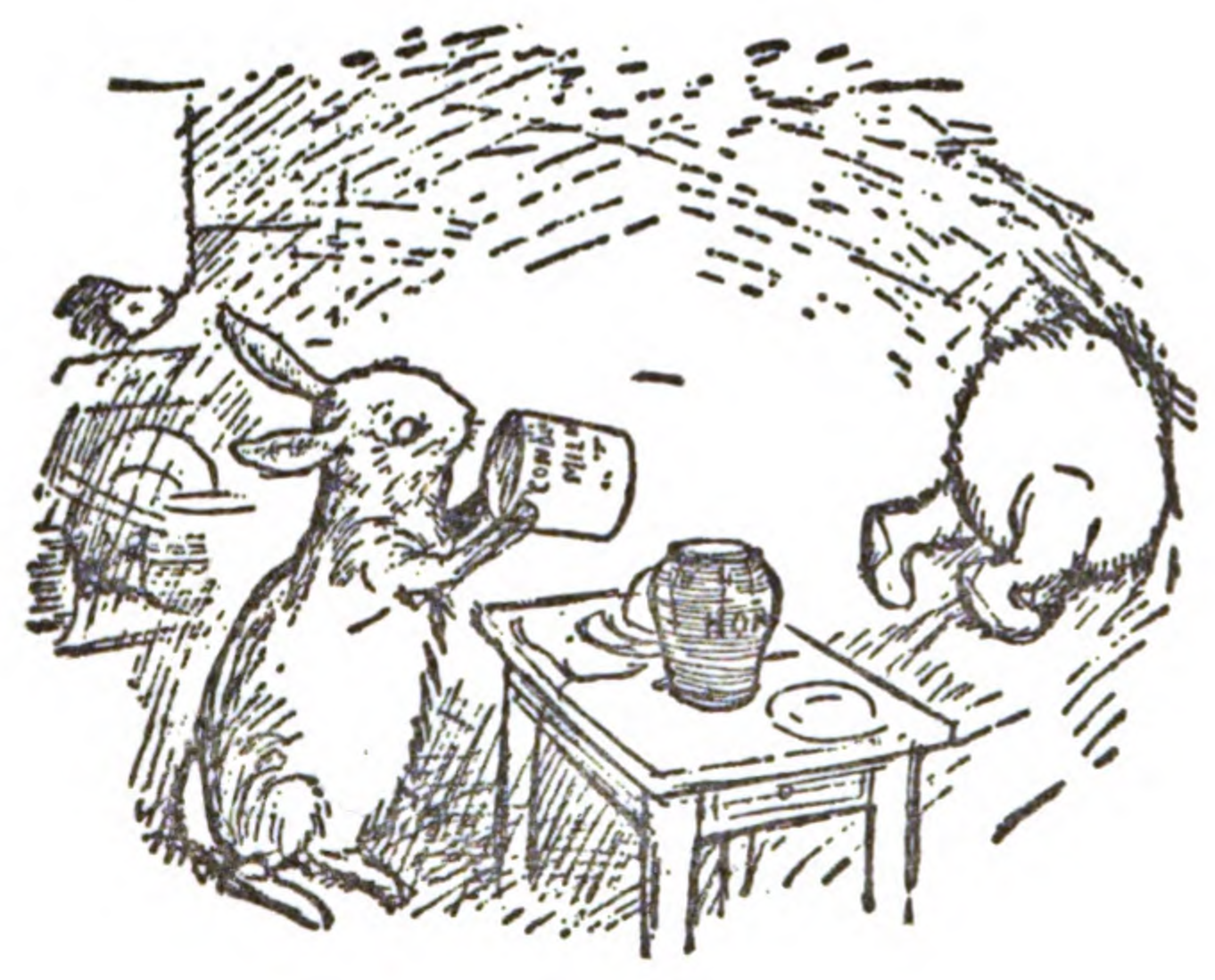
- Illustration by E. H. Shepard.
- First appearance: Winnie-the-Pooh (1926)
- Created by: A. A. Milne

In-universe information
- Species: Rabbit
- Gender: Male
- Nationality: English

Rabbit is a fictional character in the book series and cartoons Winnie-the-Pooh. He is a friend of Winnie-the-Pooh, regards himself as practical and tends to take the lead, though not always with the results that he intends.

== In the books ==
The first appearance of Rabbit is in chapter II in the Winnie-the-Pooh book by A. A. Milne. He also appears in chapters VII, VIII, IX and X of that book, as well as in chapters III, V, VI, VII, VIII, IX, and X in The House at Pooh Corner.

While most of the cast in the books are based on stuffed animals owned by Christopher Robin Milne, Ernest H. Shepard's illustrations of Rabbit look more like a living animal. Rabbit resembles an ordinary rabbit, except that he walks on two legs and uses his front paws as hands. The top of his head reaches about to Pooh's nose.

Rabbit lives in a house in the north-central part of the Hundred Acre Wood, between the sandy pit where Roo plays and the area where the animals he calls his "Friends-and-Relations" live. Rabbit likes to take charge and come up with elaborate plans, such as the one to scare Kanga by hiding Roo, and the one to "unbounce" Tigger. He is also an organizer, as in the case of the Search for Small. As detailed as his plans are, they often miss certain key points and go wrong.

Rabbit tends to include Pooh and Piglet in his plans, and he goes to Owl when there is "thinking to be done". He likes to be put in charge of things and is sometimes bossy, and he sees his relationship to Christopher Robin as being the one that Christopher depends on. While loyal to the friends he knows, Rabbit shows a certain reluctance to welcome newcomers, as evidenced by his initial negative reaction to the arrival of Kanga and Roo in the first book, and to Tigger in the second book. Nonetheless, he warms up to all of them in time.

While the literacy (or lack thereof) of Pooh, Owl, and Eeyore becomes a plot point in The House at Pooh Corner, Rabbit's ease with reading and writing is taken for granted.

Rabbit also has good relationships with the minor animals in the forest, known as "Rabbit's Friends-and-Relations". Several are mentioned by name, including beetles called Small, Alexander Beetle and Henry Rush, and three unspecified creatures called Smallest-of-All, Late, and Early. According to the illustrations of the book, his Friends-and-Relations include other rabbits, a squirrel, a hedgehog, mice, and insects. At one point, Rabbit estimates that he would need "seventeen pockets" if he were going to carry all his family about with him. Whether that number refers just to his relatives or to the friends-and-relations as a group is unknown, if it had any basis at all.

In Return to the Hundred Acre Wood, a sequel not written by A. A. Milne but by David Benedictus, Rabbit tries to organize things further. He tries to have a census in the forest, but it does not work out very well. Rabbit also attempts to teach a Household Management class and is the one who discovers Lottie the otter. His grandfather, Grandad Buck, appears in the book.

== Disney adaptations ==
Rabbit
- Disney's Winnie the Pooh character
- First appearance: Winnie the Pooh and the Honey Tree (1966)
- Created by: A.A. Milne
- Voiced by: Junius Matthews (1966–1977); Dallas McKennon (record release); Ray Erlenborn (Winnie the Pooh Discovers the Seasons); Will Ryan (1983–1986; 1989); Ken Sansom (1988–2010); Tom Kenny (2011–present); Peter Capaldi (Christopher Robin)

In-universe information
- Species: Rabbit
- Gender: Male
- Occupation: Gardener
- Family: Grandad Buck (grandfather), innumerable relatives
- Children: Kessie (adoptive daughter)

Rabbit appears in most Disney Winnie the Pooh cartoons, but he is cream yellow in color, instead of brown. An added element is his keeping of a garden, of which he is strongly protective, becoming angered when any creature, like crows and insects, seeks to damage or eat it. Although he is not described as having a garden in either of the A. A. Milne books, he has one in David Benedictus's Return to the Hundred Acre Wood.

The Disney adaptations also develop his personality further, expanding the original organized character into a by-the-book control freak with a short temper, although his care for his friends remains. The film character's willingness to do things by the book appeared in Pooh's Grand Adventure: The Search for Christopher Robin, in which he consistently follows written instructions for fear of being unable to think well for himself, although he later produces a competent plan. Despite occasional malevolent behavior, he always learns from his wrongdoing; while a leading character in the film Springtime with Roo, he abandons his selfishness after considering the possibility that it will drive all of the other characters away from the forest.

In the Disney adaptations, Rabbit and Tigger are usually foils for each other. In the original featurettes, Rabbit outright dislikes Tigger. By The New Adventures of Winnie the Pooh, however, they have become close friends, though very dysfunctional ones, who regularly work together. Tigger's antics continue to annoy Rabbit and make trouble for him, while Rabbit's harsh attitude and attempts to teach Tigger a lesson still come off as unkind, and his behaviour occasionally backfires on him. Nevertheless, Tigger is usually the first one to help Rabbit when he needs it and Rabbit cannot deny their closeness.

His character is consistent in most of the Disney adaptations, although in Welcome to Pooh Corner, he is a talented magician and in The New Adventures of Winnie the Pooh, he is pale green instead of yellow. At one point in the latter series, Rabbit adopts a bluebird named Kessie. As of 2004, Rabbit now appears at Walt Disney World in Lake Buena Vista, FL and Disneyland in Anaheim, CA for meet and greets.

=== Casting history ===
Junius Matthews was the voice of Rabbit in the first three Disney films. After his death, Ray Erlenborn briefly voiced him in Winnie the Pooh Discovers the Seasons. Will Ryan took over the role for Winnie the Pooh and a Day for Eeyore and performed both Rabbit and Tigger in Welcome to Pooh Corner.

Ken Sansom replaced Ryan beginning with The New Adventures of Winnie the Pooh and is to date Rabbit's longest-running portrayer, having continued the voice up to and including My Friends Tigger and Pooh. Tom Kenny provided the voice for the 2011 film, Winnie the Pooh. Peter Capaldi voiced Rabbit in Christopher Robin, the live-action extension of the Winnie the Pooh franchise.

== Other media ==
=== The Twisted Childhood Universe ===
- Rabbit is absent from the main narrative of Winnie-the-Pooh: Blood and Honey, but is present in the animated opening in which he the others are shown to be human-animal hybrids (aka "crossbreeds") discovered by Christopher Robin. After Christopher left for college, Rabbit and his friends began to starve during a winter famine, causing them to sacrifice and eat Eeyore. This warped their minds into feral killers, who developed a hatred for humanity and Christopher Robin. He briefly appears in another animated sequence in which he and Owl witness Pooh and Piglet kidnapping an adult Christopher.
- Rabbit is completely absent in Winnie-the-Pooh: Blood and Honey 2 but artwork for him is featured in the end credits, showing him reuniting with the others (Pooh, Piglet, Owl and Tigger) and setting up his proper debut in a future project.
- Rabbit is set to make a full appearance in Winnie-the-Pooh: Blood and Honey 3 – The Lost Years, physically portrayed by Jacob Marshfield and voiced by Roger L. Jackson.
