= Tinker Bell (film) =

2008 animated film

- DVD cover
- Directed by: Bradley Raymond
- Written by: Jeffrey M. Howard
- Based on: Tinker Bell by J. M. Barrie
- Produced by: Jeannine Roussel
- Starring: Mae Whitman; Kristin Chenoweth; Raven-Symoné; Lucy Liu; America Ferrera; Jane Horrocks; Jeff Bennett; Rob Paulsen; Pamela Adlon; Anjelica Huston
- Narrated by: Loreena McKennitt
- Edited by: Mark W. Rosenbaum
- Music by: Joel McNeely
- Production company: Disneytoon Studios
- Distributed by: Buena Vista Home Entertainment (Note: Released by Walt Disney Studios Home Entertainment through the Walt Disney Pictures banner.)
- Release date: October 28, 2008
- Running time: 78 minutes
- Country: United States
- Language: English
- Budget: $50 million
- Box office: $9.2 million

Tinker Bell is a 2008 American animated fantasy film and the first installment in the Disney Fairies franchise produced by Disneytoon Studios. It is about Tinker Bell, a fairy character created by J. M. Barrie in his 1904 play Peter Pan, or The Boy Who Wouldn't Grow Up, and featured in the 1953 Disney animated film Peter Pan and its 2002 sequel Return to Never Land. Unlike Disney's two Peter Pan films featuring the character, which were produced primarily using traditional animation, Tinker Bell was produced using digital 3D modeling.

Tinker Bell is the first Disney film to feature Tinker Bell in a speaking role. Actress Brittany Murphy was originally selected for the part before the role went to Mae Whitman. The film follows Tinker Bell’s origin story, before she met Peter Pan, as she works out her place in Pixie Hollow and struggles with what her “talent” is.

The film was released on DVD and Blu-ray by Walt Disney Studios Home Entertainment on October 28, 2008. It was followed by five sequels, beginning with Tinker Bell and the Lost Treasure in 2009.

== Plot ==
Tinker Bell is born from the first laugh of a baby and is brought by the winds to Pixie Hollow, which is part of the island of Neverland, and Queen Clarion welcomes her. She learns that her talent is to be one of the tinkers, the fairies who make and fix things. Two other tinker fairies, Bobble and Clank show her around Pixie Hollow, teach her their craft and show her house.

While out working, the trio are hit by sprinting thistles, a type of menacing weed. Tinker Bell meets Silvermist, a water fairy; Rosetta, a garden fairy; Iridessa, a light fairy; and Fawn, an animal fairy. They tell her about the fairies who visit the mainland to bring each season. Tinker Bell is thrilled and cannot wait to go to the mainland for spring. After meeting them, she notices Vidia, an ill-tempered fast-flying fairy who immediately dislikes her because of her unusually strong talent. Vidia challenges her to prove she will be able to go to the mainland, and Tinker Bell creates several inventions but messes up with them while showing them to the Minister of Spring. Tinker Bell then learns from Queen Clarion that only nature-talent fairies visit the mainland. She talks with Fairy Mary, the tinker fairy overseer, who tries to please her with who she is, but instead inspires her to "switch her talent".

She tries her hand at nature skills, such as making dewdrops with Silvermist and lighting fireflies with Iridessa, but she fails at both. Meanwhile, Bobble and Clank cover for Tinker Bell when questioned by Fairy Mary. When Tinker Bell returns, she tries to explain, but Fairy Mary simply responds that she knows, and expresses her disappointment with Tinker Bell's actions. When Fawn tries to show Tink how to teach baby birds to fly, she accidentally attracts a hawk and humiliates Vidia.

While lamenting her failures, Tinker Bell finds parts of a music box and figures out how to put them together. Iridessa, Fawn, Silvermist, and Rosetta witness her doing this, then tell her that she should be proud of her talent, if this is what she is good at, the mainland should not matter. However, Tinker Bell still wants to go to the mainland. She asks Rosetta if she will still teach her to be a garden fairy, to which she does not respond any differently.

As a last resort, Tinker Bell asks Vidia to teach her how to be a fast-flying fairy, then explains that her friends gave up on her. Vidia craftily tells her that capturing the sprinting thistles would prove her worth as a garden fairy. However, once she sees Tinker Bell making progress, she lets the captured thistles loose, and in attempting to recapture them, they destroy all the preparations for spring. Tinker Bell decides to leave, but after talking with Terence, a dust-keeper fairy, about how important his job is, she realizes her job is important as well.

Tinker Bell presents her inventions to the fairies as tools that could help repair the spring preparations. Queen Clarion orders Vidia to capture the loose thistles and allows Tinker Bell to help them save spring. With Tink’s inventions, the other fairies are able to fix all of the preparations. Queen Clarion allows Tinker Bell to join the nature-talent fairies in bringing spring to the mainland, which she proudly declines. However, Fairy Mary arrives with the music box Tinker Bell fixed and gives her the task of delivering it to its original owner, who is shown to be Wendy Darling.

== Cast ==
- Mae Whitman as Tinker Bell, a new tinker fairy.
- Lucy Liu as Silvermist, a water fairy and a friend of Tinker Bell.
- Raven-Symoné as Iridessa, a light fairy and a friend of Tinker Bell.
- Kristin Chenoweth as Rosetta, a garden fairy and a friend of Tinker Bell.
- America Ferrera as Fawn, an animal fairy and a friend of Tinker Bell.
- Jane Horrocks as Fairy Mary, the overseer of the tinker fairies.
- Jesse McCartney as Terence, the pixie-dust keeper.
- Jeff Bennett as Clank, a large tinker fairy who is friends with Bobble.
- Rob Paulsen as Bobble, a wispy tinker fairy with large glasses who is friends with Clank.
- Pamela Adlon as Vidia, a proud fast-flying fairy who is jealous of Tinker Bell’s talent.
- Anjelica Huston as Queen Clarion, the queen of Pixie Hollow who oversees the four seasons.
- Loreena McKennitt as The Narrator.
- Steve Valentine as The Minister of Spring, the grand master of spring.
- Kathy Najimy as The Minister of Summer
- Richard Portnow as The Minister of Autumn
- Gail Borges as The Minister of Winter
- America Young as Wendy Darling
- Kat Cressida as Mrs. Darling
- Bob Bergen as Fireflies

== Production ==
The film went through two dozen script versions and multiple directors. The movie was produced with animation firm Prana Studios from their India location in CGI.

Planned for release in fall 2007, the movie experienced delays in connection with personnel changes in Disney management. According to a June 2007 article in Variety, Sharon Morrill, the head of DisneyToons direct-to-DVD division since 1994, was removed from this position due to problems with the film, including a budget that had expanded to almost $50 million. Pixar Animation Studios executives John Lasseter and Ed Catmull were given leadership of Walt Disney Feature Animation after Disney purchased Pixar in early 2006, and although DisneyToons was not under their management, "they are said to have gotten increasingly involved in the unit's operations." Lasseter reportedly said that the film was at that time "virtually unwatchable" and that it would hurt both Walt Disney Feature Animation and the Disney Consumer Products line it was meant to support. Morill was moved to "special projects" and the status of the movie was seriously in doubt. Disney observer Jim Hill reported at the time that the complications surrounding this film had resulted in a decision that Disney would no longer produce straight-to-DVD sequels to its feature films, resulting in later sequels to Tinker Bell seeing theatrical releases.

== Music ==
The score to the film was composed and conducted by Joel McNeely, who recorded the music with an 88-piece ensemble of the Hollywood Studio Symphony and Celtic violin soloist Máiréad Nesbitt at the Sony Scoring Stage.

=== Soundtrack ===
The movie's soundtrack was released on October 14, 2008, a week before the DVD release and contains songs from and inspired by the film. Other than the score suite, the only tracks in the film are both parts of "To the Fairies They Draw Near," "Fly to Your Heart" and "Fly With Me."

1. "To the Fairies They Draw Near" – Loreena McKennitt
2. "Fly to Your Heart" – Selena Gomez
3. "How to Believe" – Ruby Summer
4. "Let Your Heart Sing" – Katharine McPhee
5. "Be True" – Jonatha Brooke
6. "To the Fairies They Draw Near, Part II" – Loreena McKennitt
7. "Shine" – Tiffany Giardina
8. "Fly With Me" – Kari Kimmel
9. "Wonder of It All" – Scottie Haskell
10. "End Credit Score Suite" – Joel McNeely

=== Score ===
An album of Joel McNeely's score from the film was released on July 22, 2013, through Intrada Records as part of a co-branding arrangement with Walt Disney Records.

1. Prologue
2. To the Fairies They Draw Near – Loreena McKennitt
3. A Child's Laughter / Flight to Pixie Hollow
4. Choosing a Talent
5. Tink Tours Pixie Hollow
6. Welcome to Tinker's Nook
7. Tinker Bell's New Home
8. Tink Meets the Other Fairies
9. The Lost Things Theme
10. Tink Meets Vidia and Finds Lost Things
11. Tinkering
12. Your Place is Here
13. Making Things
14. Tink Tries to be a Light Fairy
15. Teaching a Baby Bird to Fly
16. Hawk!
17. Tink Finds the Magic Box
18. Searching for Answers
19. Sprinting Thistles
20. Tink Feels Lost
21. Spring is Ruined
22. Rebuilding Spring
23. The Music Box Restored
24. To the Fairies They Draw Near, Part II – Loreena McKennitt
25. Tink Meets Wendy
26. Fly to Your Heart – Selena Gomez

== Marketing ==
The CGI-animated characters of Tinker Bell and new fairies appearing in the film were featured in Disney Channel bumpers in which they would draw the channel's logo with their wands. Rosetta represents her webisode. Marketing efforts for the film included a tie-in with Southwest Airlines, decorating and naming a Boeing 737 "Tinker Bell One". Flight attendants wore fairy wings and awarded prizes to passengers who correctly answered trivia questions about the Tinker Bell character.

Frank Nissen, the director of Cinderella III: A Twist in Time directed a series of webisodes under the title of "Pixie Preview" to promote the film on the "Fairies" channel of the Disney XD web site. Except for a few vocal effects, only one contains dialogue.

Title	Description
Tink and the Bell	Tinker Bell finds a silver jingle bell, makes funny faces at her reflection in it, and then gets stuck in it.
Tink and the Pepper Shaker	Tinker Bell finds a pepper shaker and plays with it.
Fawn and the Log	Fawn attempts to wake some sleepy squirrels in a log.
Fawn and the Butterfly	Fawn attempts to help a butterfly which is having trouble getting out of its cocoon.
Silvermist and the Fish	Silvermist helps a baby fish get over a waterfall so that it can be with its family.
Iridessa and the Light Bugs	With the help of Pixie Dust, Iridessa helps make lightning bugs glow.
Rosetta and the Flower	Rosetta has some trouble in attempting to get a stubborn flower bud to open up. (This is the only webisode with two versions: one with dialogue and one without.)

A preview of a scene from the movie proper, likely the one where Tink tries to help a small bird flap its wings, was aired as part of a The Wonderful World of Disney airing of Peter Pan on ABC on July 26, 2008. The preview has been referred to as Tink and the Bird; no sources have been found that can confirm if it was named as such during the broadcast or if it was a nickname. Tink and the Bird has also been given as the name for an alleged broadcast on Disney Jr. at 6 AM ET on January 8, 2010, but the channel did not exist at the time, nor did the Playhouse Disney programming slot launch before 8 AM ET that morning.

== Video game ==
Disney Fairies: Tinker Bell
- Developer: Genius Sonority
- Publisher: Disney Interactive Studios
- Platform: Nintendo DS
- Release: NA: October 28, 2008; EU: November 14, 2008; AU: November 27, 2008; JP: April 2, 2009
- Genre: Adventure
- Modes: Single-player, multiplayer

Disney Fairies: Tinker Bell is an adventure game for the Nintendo DS. The game begins with Tinker Bell's arrival in Pixie Hollow, preparing for each season. As the seasons progress, more areas of the game become accessible. After all four seasons are completed, every area may be visited and season preparations become optional and vary each time. Various different tasks must be accomplished, which are bestowed upon the player by other characters. Such tasks include deliveries, item repairs, requests for items and searching for insects.

The player plays as Tinker Bell in a free-roaming Pixie Hollow, using the touch screen to maneuver the character, move to other maps and play various minigames. The player must, for example, touch an arrow on the screen to move to another map or characters to speak to them. The touch screen is used in the item repair minigames as well. For example, the player must trace the pattern of a groove to clear it or rub the item to clean stains. The DS microphone is used to create wind to loosen leaves and petals or blow dust from an item being repaired. The highest rank on 'Tinker Bell' is Champion of the Craft.

Different gameplay mechanics can also be acquired in-game, which require specific use of the touch screen. These include:

- The ability to glow by holding the stylus directly above Tinker Bell. This can be used to reveal hidden items.
- Drawing a circle on-screen to perform a somersault. Used to collect falling items.
- Drawing a triangular shape on-screen to awaken plants throughout the game.
- Petting or tickling insects. Used to collect lost insects and awaken sleeping insects. Can also be used on random insects that roam about the maps. Items will be awarded.

Also present in the game is a "Friendship Meter", which serves as an indicator to measure the player's relationship with other characters. It can be filled by presenting the respective character with their favorite item, accomplishing tasks or even simply speaking to them. The meter can also be depleted, however, by not speaking to the character for extended periods of time, giving an unwanted gift or missing a repair deadline.

Features:

- Create unique dresses, outfits and accessories
- Mini-games, such as catching dew drops, painting ladybugs and collecting threads from sleeping silkworms
- Multiplayer modes
- Includes DGamer. Create unique 3-D avatars, create a persistent profile, chat with friends in a Disney Fairies chat room, earn in-game honors, Disney Fairies-themed accessories and unlock exclusive Disney and ESPN content, including streaming audio from Radio Disney and live coverage of the NBA on ESPN Radio.

== Reception ==
The film saw a brief theatrical release at the El Capitan Theatre between September 19 and October 2.

On the review aggregator website Rotten Tomatoes, 90% of 10 critics' reviews are positive, with an average rating of 6.5/10. The film was released on DVD and Blu-ray Disc on October 28, 2008. In North America, 668,000 copies were sold on its first day of release, about 22 percent above previous estimations.

DVD sales brought in $52,201,882 in revenue for 3,347,686 units sold.

== Sequels ==
Five sequels have been released: Tinker Bell and the Lost Treasure (2009), Tinker Bell and the Great Fairy Rescue (2010), Pixie Hollow Games (2011), Secret of the Wings (2012), and The Pirate Fairy (2014). One additional film Tinker Bell and the Legend of the NeverBeast, was released in Spring 2015.
