= Disney Fairies =

Disney franchise based on Never Land Fairies

- Created by: Andy Mooney
- Original work: Fairy Dust and the Quest for the Egg (2005)
- Years: 1953–present
- Based on: Disney's Peter Pan; Tinker Bell by J. M. Barrie

Print publications
- Books: Tales from Pixie Hollow; Step Into Reading; Leveled readers; Never Girls; Other books
- Novels: Fairy Dust and the Quest for the Egg (2005); Fairy Haven and the Quest for the Wand (2007); Fairies and the Quest for Never Land (2010); Wings of Starlight (2025); Wings of Reverie (2026)
- Magazine: Disney Fairies

Films and television
- Films: Tinker Bell (2008); Tinker Bell and the Lost Treasure (2009); Tinker Bell and the Great Fairy Rescue (2010); Secret of the Wings (2012); The Pirate Fairy (2014); Tinker Bell and the Legend of the NeverBeast (2015)
- Short film: Pixie Hollow Bake Off (2013)
- Television special: Pixie Hollow Games (2011)

Games
- Video games: Pixie Hollow (2008–13); Disney Fairies: Tinker Bell (2008); Disney Fairies: Tinker Bell and the Lost Treasure (2009); Disney Fairies: Tinker Bell and the Great Fairy Rescue (2010); Kinect: Disneyland Adventures (2011)^{*}; Disney Fairies: Hidden Treasures (2013); Disney Infinity 2.0 (2014)^{*}; Disney Fairies: Tinker Bell's Adventure (2014); Disney Magic Kingdoms (2016–)^{*}

Audio
- Soundtrack: Disney Fairies: Faith, Trust, and Pixie Dust (2012)

Miscellaneous
- Theme park attraction: Pixie Hollow (2008–present)

Official website
- DisneyFairies.com
- ^{*} Work where this franchise's characters or settings appeared as part of a crossover.

Disney Fairies is a Disney franchise created in 2005. The franchise is built around the character of Tinker Bell from Disney's 1953 animated film Peter Pan, subsequently adopted as a mascot for the company. In addition to the fictional fairy character created by J. M. Barrie, the franchise introduces many new characters and expands substantially upon the limited information the author gave about the fairies and their home of Never Land. The characters are referred to within stories as "Never Land fairies." The franchise includes children's books and other merchandise, a website and the animated Tinker Bell film series, featuring the character and several of the Disney fairies as supporting and recurring characters.

== Setting ==
In Barrie's 1902 novel The Little White Bird, in which he introduced the mythos of Peter Pan and the fairies, he wrote: "When the first baby laughed for the first time, his laugh broke into a million pieces, and they all went skipping about. That was the beginning of fairies." The Disney Fairies are based on a similar idea: every time a newborn baby laughs for the first time, that laugh travels out into the world and those that make their way to Never Land turn into a Never fairy.

The fairies generally reside in the Home Tree, a towering, massive tree located in the very heart of Pixie Hollow in Never Land. Various groups of fairies work and live nearby as well. Most of the fairy characters are young and female, but older, taller and male fairy characters are also included. The males are sometimes referred to as "sparrow men," though the term "fairies" is used to refer to both female and male fairy characters.

The fairies also take care of the animals. However, some of them, like rats and hawks are dangerous.

== Characters ==
=== Characters in the films ===
==== Main fairies ====
- Tinker Bell (Mae Whitman) is a tinker-talent fairy and the main protagonist of the franchise. She is a slim fairy with fair skin, blue eyes, and shoulder-length blonde hair with bangs, which is worn in a bun. She wears a medium dark green dress with lime in the down part, and matching emerald shoes with pompoms. She has clear fairy wings which are identical to her twin sister, Periwinkle.
- Bobble (Rob Paulsen) is a tinker-talent sparrow man and Clank's best friend. He is short and very slender with red hair, bright blue eyes, fair skin and wears water drop goggles. He wears a leafy sleeveless top and knee-length pants. His real name is Phineas T. Kettletree, Esquire. He speaks with a Cockney accent.
- Chloe (Brenda Song) is a garden fairy of Thai descent. She is Rosetta's partner in the Pixie Hollow Games. She is short with short brown hair, brown eyes, and fair skin. She wears a pink sports dress and leggings.
- Clank (Jeff Bennett) is a tinker-talent sparrow man. He has black hair and dark brown eyes and fair skin. He wears a leafy sleeveless top and shorts. He speaks with a Scottish accent.
- Fawn (America Ferrera (the first movie), Angela Bartys (the second to fifth movies), and Ginnifer Goodwin (the sixth movie)) is an animal fairy. She is the protagonist of Tinker Bell and the Legend of the NeverBeast. Fawn is slender with tanned skin, freckles, braided light brown hair, pointy ears, and amber eyes. She wears an orange medium dress and ocher boots.
- Iridessa (Raven-Symoné) is a light-talent fairy. She has brown eyes, pointy ears, Dark skin tone and clear fairy wings on her back and wears a yellow mustard medium dress and matching yellow shoes with sunflower petals with a sunflower on her hair.
- Periwinkle (Lucy Hale) is a frost fairy. She is Tinker Bell's twin sister, born of the same baby's first laugh. She has a little frame, pale skin, snow-white hair, and icy blue eyes. She wears a teal medium dress and matching silver shoes with pompom additions, like Tinker Bell. Periwinkle's wings are identical to her twin sister's and occasionally glow when they're close together.
- Rosetta (Kristin Chenoweth (the first three films) and Megan Hilty (the last three films)) is a garden-talent fairy. She is the protagonist of Pixie Hollow Games. Rosetta is slim and has shoulder-length red hair with curled ends, bright green eyes, and clear fairy wings. She wears a red-pink medium dress and matching red ankle strap shoes with a rose on her hair. She speaks with a Southern accent.
- Silvermist (Lucy Liu) is a water-talent fairy of Asian descent. She is slender with light skin, long loose bluish-black hair, brown eyes, and clear fairy wings and wears a medium blue dress and matching turquoise ankle strap shoes.
- Terence (Jesse McCartney) is a pixie dust sparrow man of French/Celtic descent. He has a crush on Tinker Bell and is also her best friend. He is short, slender, and hand-sized with: blond hair, blue eyes, fair skin, and pointy ears and wears an acorn top hat.
- Vidia (Pamela Adlon) is a proud fast-flying-talent fairy. She has dark violet ponytailed hair, gray eyes, pointy ears, and clear wings on her back. She wears a medium purple dress with pink feathers, purple pants and magenta ballet flat shoes. She was Tinker Bell's rival in the first movie, but later became one of her closest friends in the third movie.
- Zarina (Christina Hendricks) is a misguided dust-keeper fairy, who steals the mystical blue pixie dust from the mighty Pixie Dust Tree, endangering all of Pixie Hollow. She joins forces with the pirates of Skull Rock in The Pirate Fairy.

==== Other major fairies ====
- Queen Clarion (Anjelica Huston) is the queen of Pixie Hollow. She is slender and taller than most of the other fairies. She has pale skin, sapphire blue eyes, and honey brown hair in an up-do, and unique, large, and golden butterfly wings. Queen Clarion wears a beautiful shimmering gold dress made of pixie dust and different tiaras for certain occasions.
- Dewey (Jeff Bennett) is the Keeper of all fairy knowledge and a Winter fairy. He is short and portly with white hair and a white mustache and aqua eyes. He wears a green coat and spectacles and carries a staff. He speaks with a Western accent.
- Fairy Gary (Jeff Bennett) is a Scottish-accented overseer of the pixie dust fairies. He has a big brown mustache, hair and eyebrows, and a large nose. He wears a kilt.
- Fairy Mary (Jane Horrocks) is an overseer of the tinker fairies of English descent. She is a bit larger with brown hair and eyes and fairer skin. She wears a green sleeveless dress and leggings.
- Glimmer (Tiffany Thornton) is a storm fairy of German descent. She is Rumble's partner in the Pixie Gollow Games. She is slender with blonde hair, green eyes, fair skin, and pink blushing cheeks. She wears a black/gray sports shirt.
- Lord Milori (Timothy Dalton) is a frost fairy and the leader of the Winter fairies and is the love interest of Queen Clarion. He is slender with white hair and light brown eyes. He wears a teal blue suit and a white cape made of feathers. His right-wing is broken.
- Nyx (Rosario Dawson) is an incredibly loyal and devoted scouting-talent antihero in Legend of the NeverBeast. She protects all of Pixie Hollow from any dangers or threats and also leads a team of fellow scout fairies who follow her commands without question. She is known to be quite tough and the kind of fairy who will never back down or give up. She does as much as possible to ensure the safety and well-being of Pixie Hollow and its people.
- Rumble (Jason Dolley) is a storm sparrow man of Austrian descent. He appears in Pixie Hollow Games as the main antagonist. He is small and muscular with black hair, blue eyes, and fair skin. He wears a black/gray sports shirt.

==== Supporting and minor fairies ====
- Bolt (Roger Craig Smith) is one of the dust-talent sparrow men.
- Buck (Rob Paulsen (Pixie Hollow Games) and Jeff Corwin (sixth movie)) is an animal sparrow man of Welsh descent. He is Fawn's partner in the Pixie Hollow Games. He is short with brown hair, green eyes, and fair skin and wears an orange sports shirt.
- Fern (Zendaya) is a garden fairy of German descent. She is small with fair skin, green eyes, and brown hair. Fern wears a pink dress and shoes.
- Flint (Thom Adcox-Hernandez) is one of the dust-talent sparrow men.
- Gliss (Grey DeLisle) is a frost fairy and a best friend of Periwinkle. She is slender with white hair, blue eyes, and fair skin and wears a blue shirt, pants and shoes.
- Ivy (Kari Wahlgren) is one of Rosetta's garden fairy friends of Dutch descent. She is short with blonde hair, blue eyes, and fair skin and wears a red dress and shoes.
- Lilac (Jessica DiCicco) is one of Rosetta's garden fairy friends of Celtic descent. She is short with blonde hair, blue eyes, and fair skin. She wears a red strapless dress and shoes.
- Lumina (Jessica DiCicco) is a light fairy of Irish descent. She is Iridessa's partner in the Pixie Hollow Games. She is slender with brown hair, green eyes, fair skin, and pink blushing cheeks. She wears a yellow sports shirt.
- Lyria (Grey DeLisle) is a storyteller fairy of Scottish descent. She is slender with a long brunette braid along a loose curl, green eyes, fair skin, and pink blushing cheeks. She wears a white single-strapped dress that has a purple tip.
- Marina is a new water fairy. She is Silvermist's partner in the Pixie Hollow Games. She is slender with brown hair and skin and green eyes and wears a blue sports shirt.
- Minister of Autumn (Richard Portnow and John DiMaggio) is the minister of Autumn of Brazilian descent. He is slender with brown hair, brown eyes, and fair skin and wears clothing made out of gold leaves.
- Minister of Spring (Steve Valentine) is the minister of Spring of Irish descent. He is tall and slender with brown hair, green-turquoise eyes, and fair skin and wears a leaf crown and clothing made out of violet and blue spring flowers.
- Minister of Summer (Kathy Najimy) is the minister of Summer of Australian descent. She is quite large with brown-orange hair, green eyes, and fair skin and wears clothing made out of lilies.
- Minister of Winter (Gail Borges) is the minister of Winter of Russian descent. She is slender with white hair, blue eyes, and fair skin and wears an ice crown and clothing made out of snowflakes.
- Scribble (Thomas Lennon) is the librarian of Pixie Hollow. He is slender with black hair and brown eyes and wears wood-framed glasses. He speaks with a pre-pubescent crack to his voice. He is very taken with Nyx. He wears a dark turquoise lily single-strapped dress with blue shoes.
- Sled (Matt Lanter) is a winter animal talent sparrow man. He is short but well-toned and hand-sized with: black hair, blue eyes, fair skin, and pointy ears and wears an aqua shirt. He is Rosetta's romantic interest and one of Periwinkle's friends.
- Slush (Benjamin Diskin) is a frost sparrow man and one of Periwinkle's friends. He is of Croatian descent. Slush is small and slender with blonde hair, blue eyes, and fair skin. He wears a blue cap, an aqua shirt, and pants.
- Stone (Roger Craig Smith) is one of the dust-talent sparrow men.
- Spike (Debby Ryan) is a frost fairy and another of Periwinkle's close friends. She is of Ukrainian descent. She is slender with black hair, brown eyes, and pale skin. She wears a blue dress and blue boots.
- Viola (Grey DeLisle) is a summoning fairy of Irish descent. She is slender with blonde hair, brown eyes, and fair skin. She wears formal herald's clothing and a black cap with a white feather on top.
- Zephyr (Alicyn Packard) is a fast-flying fairy of Greek descent. She is Vidia's partner in the Pixie Hollow Games. She is slender and hand-sized with brown hair, green eyes, and fair skin and wears a purple sports shirt.

==== Non-fairy characters ====
- Blaze (Eliza Pollack Zebert) is a baby firefly who joins Tinker Bell on her quest to find the mystical Mirror of Incanta that grants one wish. He appears as one of the main characters in The Lost Treasure, and has a minor appearance in The Great Fairy Rescue.
- Cheese (Bob Bergen) is a cart-pulling mouse.
- Fiona is Dewey's pet snowy lynx.
- Dr. Martin Griffiths (Michael Sheen) is a British insect scientist with a daughter named Lizzy. He is slender with fair skin, brown hair, and eyes. He wears a green vest, a white shirt, and a black bowtie. He appears in The Great Fairy Rescue.
- Elizabeth “Lizzy” Griffiths (Lauren Mote) is a pretty nine-year-old British girl and the daughter of Dr. Martin Griffiths. She is slender with green eyes, fair skin, and brown hair with braided pigtails and wears a pink long-sleeved dress and a white smock with small tulips all over. She appears as one of the main characters in The Great Fairy Rescue.
- Grimsley (Rob Paulsen) is a Cockney accented troll who guards a bridge on a lost island north of Neverkand along with Leech. He appears in The Lost Treasure.
- Gruff is a creature that inhabits Neverland, known as "NeverBeast", and whose behavior is studied by Fawn. He appears as one of the main characters in The Legend of the NeverBeast.
- Hawks – The hawks are the most dangerous animals of Neverland, killing the fairies every year. A hawk appears in the first film, while a baby hawk appears in The Legend of the NeverBeast.
- Leech (Jeff Bennett) is a troll who guards a bridge on a lost island north of Neverland along with Grimsley. He appears in The Lost Treasure.
- Mr. Owl (Rob Paulsen) is an owl whom some Never fairies go to for advice. He appears in The Lost Treasure.
- Mr. Twitches is a male calico cat belonging to the Griffiths family. He appears in The Great Fairy Rescue.
- Mrs. Perkins (Faith Prince) is a human neighbor of Lizzy and her father. She appears in The Great Fairy Rescue.
- The pirates in The Pirate Fairy include:
  - James (Tom Hiddleston) is Zarina's cabin boy, who mutinies against her as the true captain of the crew, and who in the future would become Captain Hook, the main antagonist in Peter Pan.
  - Bonito (Carlos Ponce)
  - Oppenheimer (Jim Cummings)
  - Port (Jim Cummings)
  - Starboard (Mick Wingert)
  - Yang (Kevin Michael Richardson)
- Rats are dangerous animals that chase Tinker Bell, Blaze and Terrence. They appear in The Lost Treasure.
- Tick Tock is a crocodile who, after hatching from an egg in The Pirate Fairy, develops an affection for Rosetta, and who in the future would dedicate himself to pursuing Captain Hook in Peter Pan.

=== Characters in the books ===
==== Fairies ====
Aside from Tinker Bell, Fawn, Iridessa, Queen Clarion, Rosetta, Silvermist, Sweetpea, Terence, and Vidia are the only fairies from the books to appear in the films. Sweetpea only appears in The Pirate Fairy, as well as a small cameo in Tinker Bell and the Legend of the NeverBeast.

Some of Tink's book-only best friends include:

- Beck: An animal-talent fairy
- Bess: An art-talent fairy
- Fira: A light-talent fairy
- Lily: A garden/earth-talent fairy
- Prilla: A travel-talent fairy, introduced in Fairy Dust and the Quest for the Egg. The only fairy of her talent, Prilla can travel between Neverland and the human world. This allows her to encourage children to clap and save fairies' lives. All the other talents treat her as an honorary member and she is sometimes considered odd for her tendency to use human phrases over fairy.
- Rani: A water fairy. Rani plays a major role in Fairy Dust and the Quest for the Egg, along with Prilla and Vidia. To save Mother Dove, the other fairies, and Neverland, the fairies must retrieve a mermaid's comb. However, fairies cannot swim because their wings absorb water and drag them down. To obtain the comb, Rani cuts off her wings, becoming the only fairy who cannot fly, but also the only fairy that can swim.
- Cinda, Grace, Liesel and Rhia—the Queen's helper-talents who make sure everything is in tip-top shape for her—appear a few times in the Chapter books.

Others include:

- Angus: An expert pot-and-pans sparrow man
- Duncan: A baking talent fairy and sparrow man. He has more patience than Mixie.
- Elwood: A fast-flying talented fairy and sparrow man who loves purple and talks as fast as he flies. He can be annoying, but he is very kindhearted.
- Ginger: A baking-talent fairy who likes to show up to Dulcie with her baking and tends to be very rude. She took over when Dulcie had a vacation. But, they soon learn to work together.
- Glissandra: A cheerful, blonde, light-talent fairy who wears makeup a lot.
- Humidia: A water talent who makes the jet at the top of the water fountain in Rani in the Mermaid Lagoon.
- Hydrangea: A beautiful water talent fairy who always wears blue eyeshadow.
- Idalia: A garden talent fairy with dark brown hair.
- Luminaria: A cheerful, blonde, light-talent fairy.
- Luna: A beautiful, light fairy like the glue that keeps Fira and Iridessa together.
- Magnolia: A leaf talent fairy.
- Melina: A glass-blowing, art-talent fairy. She has strawberry blonde hair, blue eyes and peach skin. Her main outfit is: a blue shirt, teal pants, an emerald green leaf headscarf, a green apron and olive green shoes.
- Mixie: A baking talent fairy who helps Dulcie.
- Nettle: A fairy whose magical talent is caterpillar-shearing. She, Prilla and Myka are friends.
- Nilsa: A scout fairy who dies of disbelief in Fairy Dust and the Quest for the Egg.
- Nollie: A brunette, cute, grateful animal-talent fairy.
- Olwen: A young garden fairy who loves planting seeds and looks up to Tinker Bell and Queen Clarion.
- Pell: A harvest-talent fairy and Pluck's best friend (they look like twins).
- Pluck: A harvest-talent fairy who loves to find and collect delicious fruits and nuts.
- Quill: An art-talent fairy who is quiet, shy and is very good friends with Bess.
- Rune: A story-telling fairy.
- Scarlet: A new art-talent fairy. She is especially skilled in pottery and is friends with Bess.
- Sera: A scouting-talent fairy.
- Spring: A spunky message-talent fairy who is good friends with Fira and Lily.
- Sweet Pea: A new fairy (mentioned above).
- Temma: A shoemaker fairy who dies drowning in a flood in Fairy Haven and the Quest for the Wand.
- Tizzywing: A fast-flying fairy who gets sick easily and, unlike Vidia, is very kind.
- Trak: A scouting-talent sparrow man. He is Myka's friend.
- Twire: A scrap-metal talent fairy who melts down metal to recycle. She sometimes fights with Tinker Bell over who gets to keep the metal for melting or fixing.
- Violet: One of the cutest fairies in Pixie Hollow. She is a dyeing talent who has corkscrew curls and is friends with Bess.
- Wisp: A new fast-flying-talent fairy who is almost as fast as Vidia, through training. She and Vidia race through the Hollow and later engage in a friendly rivalry.
- Zuzu: A tinker-talent fairy who is very loyal to her job.

==== Major non-fairy characters ====
Several key characters are not Never Fairies.

- Brother Dove: A dove who carries the wingless water fairy Rani on his back when she wishes to fly. He may be one of Mother Dove's chicks since he can talk to all the fairies, not just animal talents.
- Fufalla: A wand fairy who loves to play pranks and practical jokes on others.
- Kyto: A dragon who has been caged for as long as anyone can remember. He is very sneaky and once, when Mother Dove's egg broke, he had to make it whole again with a trade of: Captain Hook's double cigar holder, the golden hawk's feather, a mermaid's comb and Rani's wings.
- Mother Dove: A dove who has an egg that is in Pixie Hollow that was broken but restored by Rani, Vidia and Prilla in Fairy Dust and the Quest for the Egg. Mother Dove helps the people in Neverland stay young and is mentioned in every book.
- Tutupia: The queen of the Great Wanded fairies (or Great Wandies). Great-wand fairies are about seven feet tall and have mystical wands or scepters that possess many magical properties.

==== Never Mermaids ====
There is a set of key Never Mermaids:

- Numi: She has blue hair and a magenta tail.
- Oola: A mermaid with yellow-green hair, green eyes and a yellow-green tail. She's the first mermaid to befriend Rani but has a weird way of showing it.
- Pah: A beautiful mermaid of middle rank who talks funny and is Soop's best friend.
- Rory: A helping talent fairy with brown hair in a loose braid, wears a rose petal dress.
- Soop: A beautiful and generous mermaid of middle rank who can be impatient. She is the one who gave her comb to Rani to give to Kyto in exchange for restoring Mother Dove's egg.
- Voona: She has yellow-orange hair, a yellow-orange tail and a violet scarf.

== Publications ==
Disney Publishing Worldwide transferred the Disney Fairies franchise's main publishing license to Little, Brown Books for Young Readers in January 2014 except for the Never Girls series starting in February. This rollout will include nine titles including: leveled readers, storybooks, a Passport to the Reading title, a sticker book and a board book. Brown planned to introduce a new character, Croc, in the board book to allow the line to appeal to younger readers, including some boys. Additionally, Brown's plan includes a greater connection to the Peter Pan story, pirates and Never Land. Five of the books tie into the home video release of The Pirate Fairy.

=== Fairy Dust trilogy ===
Fairy Dust trilogy
- Fairy Dust and the Quest for the Egg; Fairy Haven and the Quest for the Wand; Fairies and the Quest for Never Land
- Author: Gail Carson Levine
- Illustrator: David Christiana
- Genre: Fiction, Fantasy, Children's book
- Publisher: Disney Publishing Worldwide
- Published: 2005, 2007, 2010
- OCLC: 61457088
- Website: ISBN 978-0-7868-3491-4

At the opening of the 2005 Bologna International Children's Book Fair, the Walt Disney Company revealed its plan to introduce a children's illustrated novel for girls 6–10 years of age. Disney Fairies debuted September 2005, when Disney Publishing Worldwide unveiled the novel Fairy Dust and the Quest for the Egg, written by Newbery Honor-winning author Gail Carson Levine with a $1 million marketing and publicity campaign and a virtual world. It was released in 45 countries and 32 languages and became a New York Times bestseller and has already sold over 1 million copies worldwide.

The story begins in Fairy Haven, located in the heart of Never Land. Prilla, who is a brand-new fairy, born of a baby's laugh, arrives in Never Land and discovers that she has no talent for any of the fairy avocations. Tinker Bell takes Prilla to see Mother Dove, but before the wise bird can advise Prilla, Never Land is shaken by a terrible hurricane. Mother Dove is thrown off her nest and her precious egg, which holds all the secrets of Never Land, is shattered. Immediately, all those who live in Never Land begin to age. The island's only hope is for some brave fairies to take the egg pieces to Kyto the dragon and ask him to restore it with his fiery breath.

The book was followed by two sequels; Fairy Haven and the Quest for the Wand in 2007 and Fairies and the Quest for Never Land in 2010.

=== Tales from Pixie Hollow ===
Random House has published a series of chapter books starting soon after the release of the first novel under the banner Tales from Pixie Hollow.

- The Trouble with Tink ~ by Kiki Thorpe
- Vidia and the Fairy Crown ~ by Laura Driscoll
- Beck and the Great Berry Battle ~ by Laura Driscoll
- Lily's Pesky Plant ~ by Kirsten Larsen
- Rani in the Mermaid Lagoon ~ by Lisa Papademetriou
- Fira and the Full Moon ~ by Gail Herman
- Tinker Bell Takes Charge ~ by Eleanor Fremont (included in Tinker Bell: Two Pirate Tales, published separately by HarperCollins)
- A Masterpiece for Bess ~ by Lara Bergen
- Prilla and the Butterfly Lie ~ by Kitty Richards
- Rani and the Three Treasures ~ by Kimberly Morris (included in Rani: Two Friendship Tales, published separately by HarperCollins)
- Tink, North of Never Land ~ by Kiki Thorpe
- Beck Beyond the Sea ~ by Kimberly Morris
- Dulcie's Taste of Magic ~ by Gail Herman
- Silvermist and the Ladybug Curse ~ by Gail Herman
- Fawn and the Mysterious Trickster ~ by Laura Driscoll
- Rosetta's Daring Day ~ by Lisa Papademetriou
- Iridessa, Lost at Sea ~ by Lisa Papademetriou
- Queen Clarion's Secret ~ by Kimberly Morris
- Myka Finds Her Way ~ by Gail Herman
- Lily in Full Bloom ~ by Laura Driscoll
- Vidia Meets Her Match ~ by Kiki Thorpe
- Four Clues for Rani ~ by Catherine Daly
- Trill Changes Her Tune ~ by Gail Herman
- Tink in a Fairy Fix ~ by Kiki Thorpe
- Rosetta's Dress Mess ~ by Laura Driscoll
- Art Lessons by Bess ~ by Amy Vincent (included in Bess: Two Colorful Tales)
- Iridessa and the Secret of the Never Mine ~ by Nnedi Okorafor

=== Step Into Reading books ===
- The Great Fairy Race (Step 3)
- A Fairy Tale (Step 3)
- A Game of Hide-and-Seek (Step 3)
- Tink's Treasure Hunt (Step 3)
- Beck's Bunny Secret (Step 3)
- Vidia Takes Charge (Step 3)
- New Friends (Step 3)
- The Fairy Berry Bake-Off (Step 4)
- Pixie Hollow Paint Day (Step 4)
- A Dozen Fairy Dresses (Step 4)
- Please Don't Feed the Tiger Lily (Step 4)
- A Fairy Frost (Step 4)

=== Never Girls ===
In January 2013, PDW launched Never Girls chapter book series extension of the Disney Fairies franchise under publishing partner Random House's Stepping Stone imprint. The Never Girls chapter series reached the New York Times Best Seller List – Children's Series on the week of August 10. Random House retained publication of this line despite the move of the franchise's general move to Little, Brown in February 2014.

=== Leveled readers ===
- Disney Fairies: Meet Tinker Bell
- Disney Fairies: Meet Zarina the Pirate Fairy
- Disney Fairies: Meet Vidia
- Disney Fairies: Meet Periwinkle
- Disney Fairies: Meet Fawn the Animal-Talent Fairy
- Disney Fairies: Meet Nyx the Scout Fairy
- Disney Fairies: Meet Rosetta
- Disney Fairies: Meet Silvermist
- Disney Fairies: Meet Iridessa

=== Disney Fairies magazine ===
In June 2006, Egmont Magazines launched a new monthly magazine for girls 5–9 years old, produced by The Walt Disney Company Italia, S.p.A. and published in Italy a couple of months before the Egmont translations.

The magazine, entitled Fairies, began with an initial print of 110,000 copies and a cover price of £1.99. The magazine's content is centered on Tinker Bell, and her fairy friends from Pixie Hollow. Each issue features: a collectable pull-out story, games, puzzles, posters and coloring pages. Fairies Magazine has been launched in: Italy, Malaysia, Singapore, Poland, Russia, Spain, the Nordic countries, Portugal, Germany and Benelux.

=== Graphic novels ===
In May 2009, Papercutz publishing pickup a license to produce original graphic novels to hit the stands in April 2010 at the rate of four per year.

The 2007 manga and 2008 graphic novel Disney Fairies: Petite's Little Diary, published by Kodansha and distributed by Tokyopop, follows the misadventures of Tinker Bell and her friends.

=== Wings of Pixie Hollow series ===
==== Wings of Starlight ====
In 2025, Wings of Starlight, by Allison Saft was published. The young adult romantasy novel explores the origin story of the ruler of Pixie Hollow, Queen Clarion, including her romance with Lord Milori, previously alluded to in the film Secret of the Wings. The book became a #1 New York Times bestseller and a USA Today bestseller.

==== Wings of Reverie ====
On February 13, 2026, Wings of Reverie was announced, authored by Anna Bright and set for release on August 4, 2026. Set centuries after the events of Wings of Starlight, Wings of Reverie features frost fairy Periwinkle from the film Secret of the Wings. The plot will relvove around Periwinkle's relationship with a dream-talent fairy named Weaver.

=== Other books ===
- In the Realm of the Never Fairies: The Secret World of Pixie Hollow ~ by Monique Peterson
- Mysterious Messages ~ by Tennant Redbank
- Prilla's Prize ~ by Lisa Papademetriou
- Secret Fairy Homes
- A Poem for Tink
- The Disappearing Sun
- The Shell Gift
- Fairies in Flight ~ by Posner
- Welcome to Pixie Hollow
- Wake UP, Croc! ~ by Brown Little (Little, Brown) Pirate Fairy board book
- Pixie Hollow Reading Adventures (Little, Brown) Passport to Reading, Level 1
- Pirate Fairy Reusable Sticker Book (Little, Brown)
- Bleakwatch Chronicles: Tinker Bell and the Lost City (book 1) ~ by Zack Loran Clark
- Bleakwatch Chronicles: Tinker Bell and the Clockwork King (book 2) ~ by Zack Loran Clark

== Merchandising ==
In addition to the published work, The Walt Disney Company provides support for Disney Fairies across all business units. The campaign includes the Disney Fairies Website, where visitors can explore and discover information about Disney Fairies. The website allows users to: learn about the fairies, create a fairy, visit Pixie Hollow and explore related merchandise.

Disney Consumer Products have also produced a line of dolls and role-play assortments. The first Disney Fairies products were a series of 10-inch dolls, which were a Disney Store exclusive in January 2006. Since then, Playmates Toys teamed up with Disney in October 2005 to design and produce a line of toys for the Disney Fairies, which will include: 3.5" small dolls, 8" fashion dolls, playsets and activity sets with DVDs and collectible story cards. Fairy Dust and the Quest for the Egg was the inspiration for the line of toys. Disney Consumer Products launched a wide variety of Disney Fairies branded items, consisting of everything from apparel to stationery.

A series of ten postage stamps were issued by Japan Post in 2006. Each stamp has a face value of 80 JPY and they were distributed in a hardcover case including some information about the Fairies. The stamps could be ordered at some post offices in Japan and were for domestic addresses.

== Films ==
A long-running series of animated films featuring Tinker Bell had been released from 2008 until 2014. Produced by Disneytoon Studios and distributed by Walt Disney Studios Home Entertainment, the series consists of six direct-to-video films and two TV specials.

- Tinker Bell (October 28, 2008)
- Tinker Bell and the Lost Treasure (October 27, 2009)
- Tinker Bell and the Great Fairy Rescue (September 21, 2010)
- Pixie Hollow Games (November 19, 2011; TV special)
- Secret of the Wings (October 23, 2012)
- Pixie Hollow Bake Off (October 20, 2013; TV special)
- The Pirate Fairy (April 1, 2014)
- Tinker Bell and the Legend of the NeverBeast (December 12, 2014)

== Theme park attractions ==
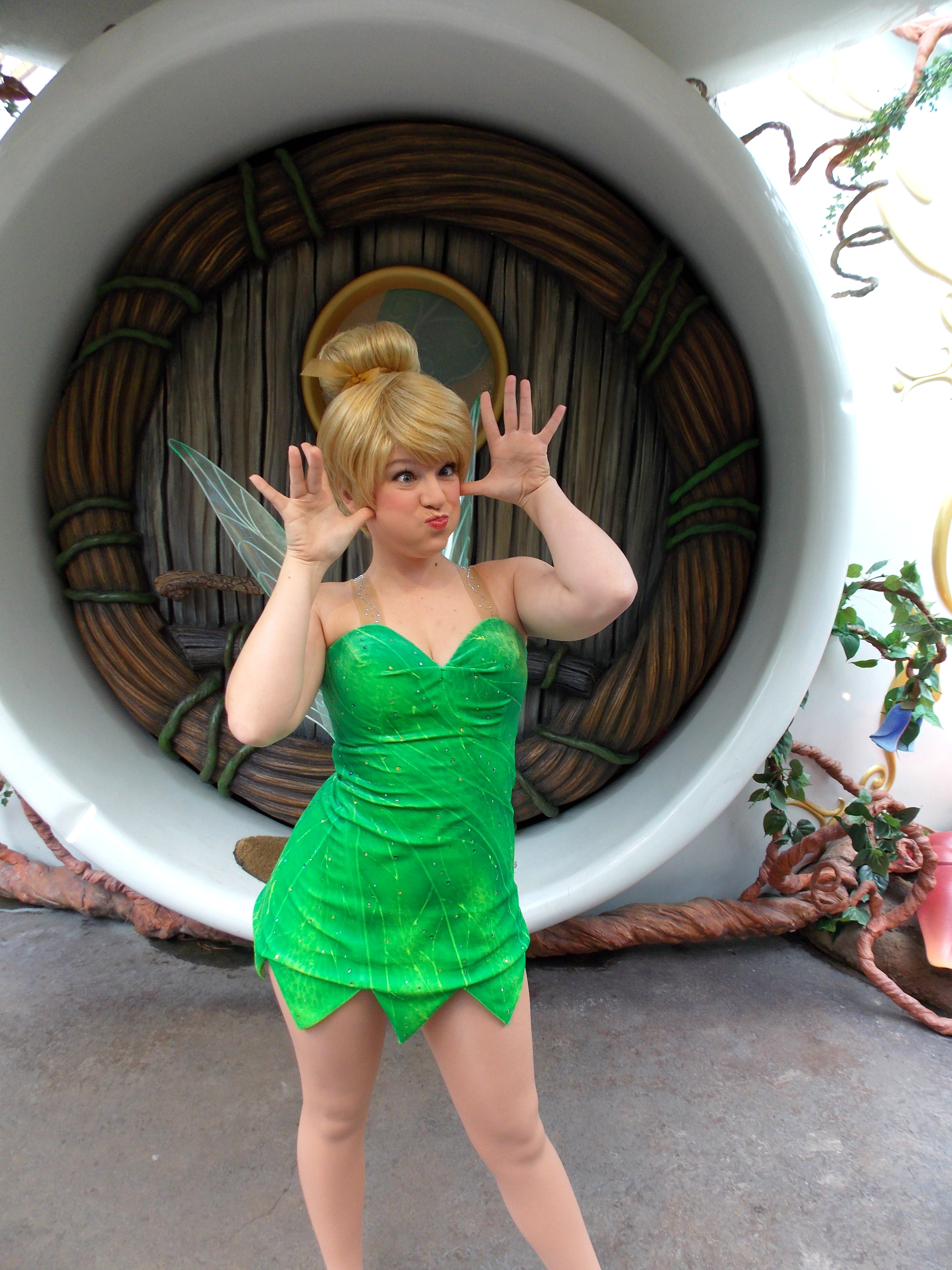
Tinker Bell makes a face at Pixie Hollow.

In October 2008, two Pixie Hollow locations opened at Disney Parks. One opened at Disneyland near the Matterhorn Bobsleds in the area where Ariel's Grotto was formerly located and the other at Walt Disney World's Magic Kingdom in Mickey's Toontown. Another version opened at Hong Kong Disneyland on January 21, 2011, as one of the festivities to celebrate the park's 5th anniversary. At these Pixie Hollow locations, guests have the opportunity to meet and greet Tinker Bell and her fairy friends Silvermist, Rosetta, Iridessa, Fawn, Terence and Vidia and her twin sister Periwinkle, from the franchise, as well as dine with them.

The Magic Kingdom location closed in February 2011 as part of the ongoing Fantasyland expansion. A larger Pixie Hollow area was included in the original plans for the expansion, but they have since been abandoned. On July 28, 2011, Tinker Bell and friends returned to the Magic Kingdom in "Tinker Bell's Magical Nook," located at the Adventureland Veranda. However, in 2014, it was closed and Tinker Bell moved to Town Square Theater where she can greet guests alone.

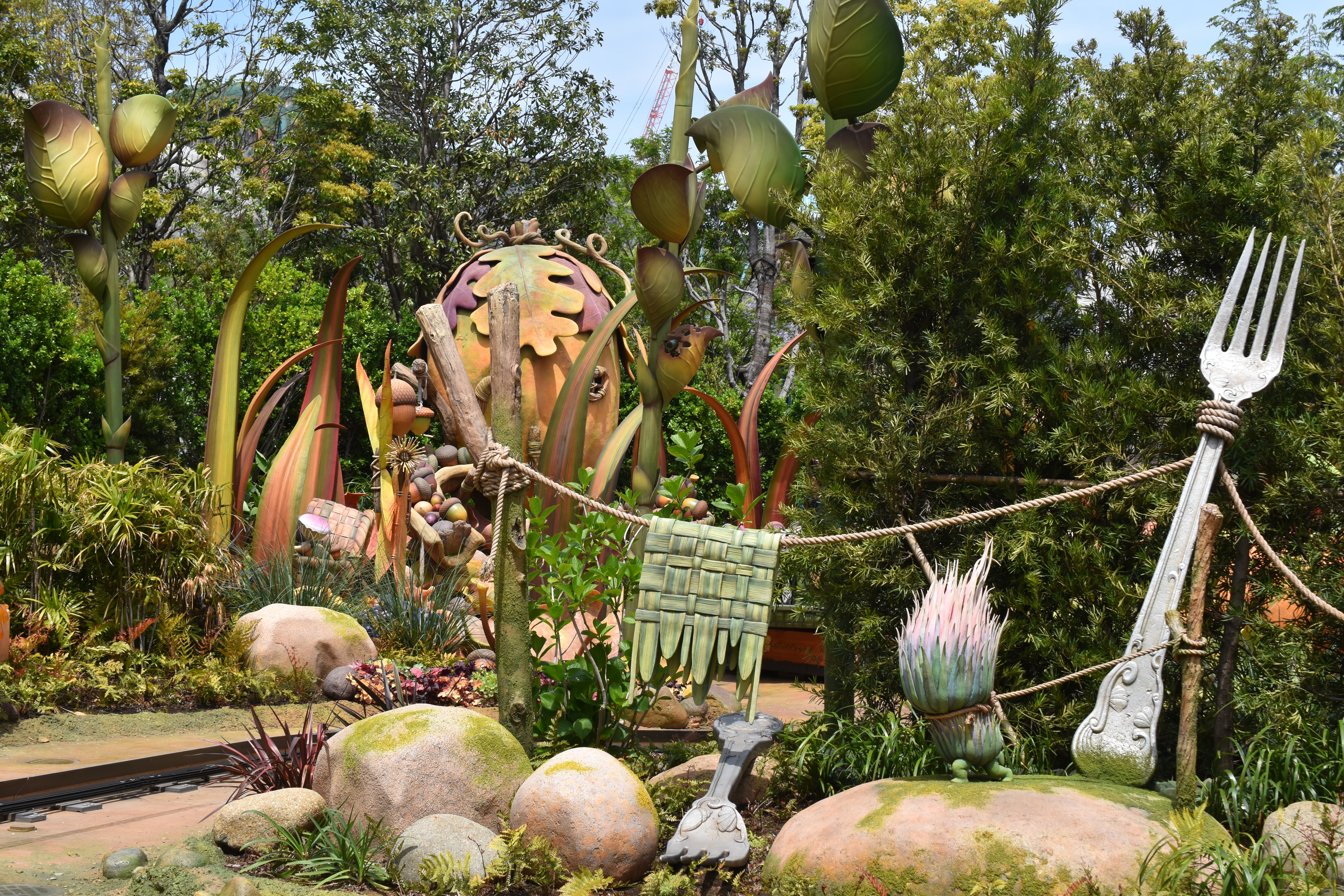
A “sprinting thistle” in Fairy Tinker Bell’s Busy Buggies

In 2024, Fairy Tinker Bell's Busy Buggies, an outdoor ride attraction, opened as part of the Fantasy Springs themed area in Tokyo DisneySea.The spinning tracked ride is themed after the Tinker Bell film series. Guests experience a fairy-sized perspective as they travel in their 4-seater buggy through Pixie Hollow. The 2-minute ride takes guests through various seasonal locations throughout Pixie Hollow, as they 'help' Tinker Bell deliver parcels and packages. Guests encounter various audio-animatronics of the fairies from the films along the way.

== Video games ==
=== Pixie Hollow ===
Pixie Hollow (Fairies Online)
- Developer: Disney Interactive Media Group
- Publisher: The Walt Disney Company
- Engine: Flash
- Platform: PC/Mac
- Genre: MMOG
- Mode: Online

Pixie Hollow was an MMOG created by The Walt Disney Company and released September 8, 2008. The game was free to play online, however a subscription was needed to have access to things for members only. The website was based partly on the Disney fairy books written by Gail Carson Levine. Free members could create a female Fairy or male Sparrow Man avatar who each came with a small selection of furnishings to decorate a virtual room. Players were able to interact with others and have access to both 'speed' chat with pre-selected phrases and full chat where they can type their messages. They could also play various "Talent Games" or fairy-themed mini-games, found in the various meadows and forests of Pixie Hollow. The game used organic materials as a virtual currency for players to shop. Players could also play games and visit places to earn badges that they could see in their "leaf journal," which also served as a handbook and inventory. Players could purchase a monthly, semi-annual or annual membership. The membership included: Clothing, furniture, access to the ballroom and a hair salon with a spa.

You could also purchase Pixie Diamonds. Members were granted an allowance of Pixie Diamonds (once a month). People who were not members were able to buy clothing, but they had to use Pixie Diamonds. In January 2012, "Pixie Diamonds" were introduced, an in-game currency that could be purchased with real-world money and used to buy or upgrade items without an active membership. Though the website was geared towards young girls, on April 22, 2010, the game introduced a male character named Slate; he was referred to as a "sparrow man" rather than a male fairy.

On August 20, 2013, it was announced that Pixie Hollow would be closing on September 19, 2013. All the fairies were given unlimited access to the world until the closing date.

=== Other games ===
The video game Disney Magic Kingdoms includes Tinker Bell, Queen Clarion, Vidia, Rosseta, Silvermist and Periwinkle as playable characters, as well as Pixie Hollow as attraction.

In Disney Dreamlight Valley are included several items based on the Disney Fairies franchise.

== Television appearances ==
=== Once Upon a Time ===
Two of the characters from the Disney Fairies franchise have appeared in the universe of the ABC's fantasy drama series Once Upon a Time. Tinker Bell appears as a recurring character played by Rose McIver and debuts in the third episode of season 3. Silvermist (played by Jordana Largy) appeared in the second episode of the spin-off Once Upon a Time in Wonderland.

=== Tink ===
On March 9, 2026, Deadline exclusively revealed a live-action series is in the works at Disney+ under the working title Tink. The drama series is reported to be written and executive produced by Liz Heldens and Bridget Carpenter. Former Disney Channels Worldwide president/Disney Branded Television president and chief creative officer Gary Marsh will also executive produce the project alongside Quinn Haberman and Heldens’ production company Selfish Mermaid. Variety reported that Tink is a "high priority project" for Disney+.
