= Tinker Bell and the Lost Treasure =

- DVD cover
- Directed by: Klay Hall
- Written by: Evan Spiliotopoulos
- Based on: Tinker Bell by J. M. Barrie
- Produced by: Sean Lurie
- Starring: Mae Whitman; Jesse McCartney; Jane Horrocks; Raven-Symoné; Lucy Liu; Kristin Chenoweth; Angela Bartys; Anjelica Huston; Jeff Bennett; Rob Paulsen
- Narrated by: Grey DeLisle
- Edited by: Jeremy Milton
- Music by: Joel McNeely
- Production company: Disneytoon Studios
- Distributed by: Walt Disney Studios Home Entertainment; Walt Disney Studios Motion Pictures
- Release date: October 27, 2009 (United States)
- Running time: 80 minutes
- Country: United States
- Language: English
- Budget: $30—$35 million
- Box office: $8.6 million

Tinker Bell and the Lost Treasure is a 2009 American animated fantasy adventure film directed by Klay Hall and the second installment in the Disney Fairies franchise. Produced by Disneytoon Studios, it was animated by Prana Studios, and revolves around Tinker Bell, a fairy character created by J. M. Barrie in his 1904 play Peter Pan, or The Boy Who Wouldn't Grow Up, and featured in subsequent adaptations, especially in Disney's animated works. The film follows Tinker Bell (Mae Whitman) embarking on an adventure beyond Pixie Hollow as she searches for a magic mirror, with the help of her best friend Terence (Jesse McCartney).

The film was released on Blu-ray and DVD by Walt Disney Studios Home Entertainment on October 27, 2009. It was followed by four more sequels: Tinker Bell and the Great Fairy Rescue, Secret of the Wings, The Pirate Fairy and Tinker Bell and the Legend of the NeverBeast.

== Plot ==
As the nature fairies prepare to bring Autumn to the mainland, Tinker Bell works on a new invention to help her friend Terence. She is summoned by Queen Clarion, Fairy Mary, and the Minister of Autumn, who reveal the existence of a mystical moonstone. Every eight years, during the Autumn Revelry, the light of the blue harvest moon passes through the moonstone to create blue pixie dust, which restores the Pixie Dust Tree. Tinker Bell is chosen to create the ceremonial scepter that will hold the moonstone during the ritual.

As Tinker Bell works on the scepter, she asks Terence to assist her. However, she becomes increasingly frustrated by what she sees as his clumsy attempts to help. When she asks him to find something sharp, Terence brings her a compass, unaware that the sharp object she needs is the compass needle inside. Tinker Bell accidentally knocks the compass onto the completed scepter, crushing it. Furious, she lashes out on Terence and sends him away. While venting her frustration alone, she inadvertently causes the compass to strike and shatter the moonstone.

Distraught, Tinker Bell attends a theatrical performance where she learns the legend of a magical mirror that granted two of its three wishes before becoming lost. After another argument with Terence, who refuses to give her additional pixie dust, she secretly leaves Pixie Hollow in a balloon to find the mirror and use its final wish to restore the moonstone before the Autumn Revelry.

During her journey, Tinker Bell narrowly escapes a hungry bat and encounters a green firefly named Blaze, who accidentally crashes into her balloon. Although initially reluctant, she allows Blaze to accompany her. Believing she has found the legendary stone arch that leads to the mirror, Tinker Bell leaves the balloon to investigate, but it breaks free from its moorings and drifts away. She and Blaze unsuccessfully attempt to pursue it before being overcome by strong winds.

The following morning, a group of friendly insects helps guide Tinker Bell and Blaze to the real stone arch. After avoiding two dim-witted trolls, they discover the shipwreck where the mirror is hidden. Upon finally reaching it, Blaze's buzzing distracts Tinker Bell, causing her to impulsively wish for him to be quiet for a minute and inadvertently waste the mirror's final wish. Thinking it was all for nothing, she yells at Blaze before realizing that her own temper was what caused her repeated misfortunes. She apologizes to him and tearfully admits that she only wishes she could make things right with Terence.

Terence soon arrives, having followed Tinker Bell after learning of her plan and recovering her lost balloon along the way. The two reconcile and escape the shipwreck with Blaze after being pursued by a swarm of rats. On their journey home, Tinker Bell and Terence repair the ceremonial scepter by using pieces of the mirror's jeweled handle along with the compass needle from earlier.

Returning to Pixie Hollow just as the Autumn Revelry begins, Tinker Bell presents the rebuilt scepter, now containing fragments of the shattered moonstone. Although the assembled fairies are initially horrified, the jewel from the mirror refracts the blue harvest moon's light into each fragment of the moonstone, producing an even greater amount of blue pixie dust than before. The Pixie Dust Tree is successfully restored, and Tinker Bell, Terence, and Blaze join the other fairies in celebrating the festival.

== Voice cast ==
The voice actors and actresses are largely the same as in the previous film. America Ferrera did not reprise her role as Fawn and was replaced by newcomer Angela Bartys.

- Mae Whitman as Tinker Bell, a tinker fairy.
- Jesse McCartney as Terence, the pixie-dust keeper.
- Jane Horrocks as Fairy Mary, the overseer of all tinker fairies.
- Lucy Liu as Silvermist, a water fairy.
- Raven-Symoné as Iridessa, a light fairy.
- Kristin Chenoweth as Rosetta, a garden fairy.
- Angela Bartys as Fawn, an animal fairy.
- Rob Paulsen as Bobble, a wispy tinker fairy with large glasses. / Grimsley, a tall troll. / Mr. Owl
- Jeff Bennett as Clank, a large tinker fairy with a booming voice. / Fairy Gary, the overseer of the pixie-dust keepers. / Leech, a short troll.
- Grey DeLisle as Lyria, a storytelling fairy. / Viola, the Queen's herald. / Narrator
- John DiMaggio as Redleaf, the Minister of Autumn.
- Eliza Pollack Zebert as Blaze, a firefly.
- Bob Bergen as Bugs / Creatures
- Roger Craig Smith as Bolt, a pixie-dust keeper. / Stone, a pixie-dust keeper.
- Allison Roth as French Fairy
- Thom Adcox-Hernandez as Flint, a pixie-dust keeper.
- Anjelica Huston as Queen Clarion, the queen of all Pixie Hollow.

== Crew ==
- Director – Klay Hall
- Writer – Evan Spiliotopoulos

== Production ==
Since the film takes place in the cooler weather of autumn, the costume design for Tinker Bell called for a more realistic outfit. Designers added a long-sleeve shirt, shawl, leggings, and boots to her costume. According to Klay Hall, he stated that "in the earlier films, she wears her iconic little green dress. However, it being fall and there being crispness in the air, in addition to this being an adventure movie, her dress just wouldn't work".

== Soundtrack ==
The soundtrack was released on September 22, 2009, and contains songs from and inspired by the film. The soundtrack includes "Gift of a Friend" by Demi Lovato, which was released as a promotional single on December 16, 2009. The soundtrack also contains "Fly to Your Heart" from the first film.

1. "Gift of a Friend" – Demi Lovato
2. "Take to the Sky" – Jordan Pruitt
3. "Where the Sunbeams Play" – Méav Ní Mhaolchatha
4. "Road to Paradise" – Jordin Sparks
5. "I'll Try" – Jesse McCartney
6. "If You Believe" – Lisa Kelly
7. "Magic Mirror" – Tiffany Thornton
8. "The Magic of a Friend" – Hayley Orrantia
9. "It's Love That Holds Your Hand" – Jonatha Brooke
10. "A Greater Treasure Than a Friend" – Savannah Outen
11. "Pixie Dust" – Ruby Summer
12. "Fly Away Home" – Alyson Stoner
13. "Fly to Your Heart" – Selena Gomez

Japanese singer Ayumi Hamasaki's song "You Were..." was chosen as the theme song for the Japanese-language version of the movie.

=== Score ===
Intrada Records released an album of Joel McNeely's score on February 2, 2015, through the label's co-branding arrangement with Walt Disney Records. Unlike the first movie, none of McNeely's score has been previously released. The score to the film was composed and conducted by Joel McNeely, who scored the first Tinker Bell film. He recorded the music with an 82-piece ensemble of the Hollywood Studio Symphony and Celtic violin soloist Máiréad Nesbitt at the Sony Scoring Stage.

1. Tapestry
2. If You Believe/Main Title – Lisa Kelly
3. Pixie Dust Factory
4. Where Are You Off To?
5. Pixie Dust Express
6. The Hall of Scepters
7. Maybe I Can Help
8. The Fireworks Launcher
9. The Finishing Touch/I Had a Fight with Tink
10. Fairy Tale Theatre – Grey DeLisle and Julie Garnyé
11. Tink Sails Away
12. Tink Tries for More Pixie Dust
13. I'm on My Own
14. Sailing Further North
15. Blaze the Stowaway
16. I'll Take First Watch
17. The Lost Island
18. Tink Finds the Arch
19. Troll Bridge Toll Bridge
20. The Ship That Sunk
21. Searching the Ship
22. They Find the Mirror of Encanta
23. I Was Wrong
24. Rat Attack
25. I Can't Do This Without You
26. Presenting the Autumn Scepter
27. Our Finest Revelry Ever
28. If You Believe, Part 2 – Lisa Kelly
29. Gift of a Friend – Demi Lovato
30. Where the Sunbeams Play – Méav Ni Mhalchatha

=== Chart performance ===
Chart (2009)	Peak position
US Kid Digital Songs (Billboard)	8

=== Gift of a Friend ===
"Gift of a Friend"

Promotional single by Demi Lovato

from the album Tinker Bell and the Lost Treasure
- Released: December 16, 2009
- Recorded: 2009
- Studio: Robert Vosgien Mastering (Burbank, CA)
- Genre: Pop rock
- Length: 3:25
- Label: Walt Disney, Hollywood
- Songwriters: Adam Watts, Andy Dodd, Demi Lovato
- Producer: John Fields

Music video
- "Gift of a Friend" on YouTube

"Gift of a Friend" was released as a promotional single on December 16, 2009. A music video was released for the song on September 4, 2009. It is performed by American singer and actress Demi Lovato and also appears as a bonus track on her second studio album Here We Go Again and appears on Disneymania 7, a new mix of the song appears on the compilation album Disney Fairies: Faith, Trust, and Pixie Dust.

== Release ==
The film premiered at the United Nations Headquarters on October 25, 2009. Kiyotaka Akasaka, Under-Secretary-General for Communications and Public Information, named Tinker Bell the "honorary Ambassador of Green" to help promote environmental awareness among children.

The film was released on DVD and Blu-ray by Walt Disney Studios Home Entertainment in the United States on October 27, 2009, and in the United Kingdom on November 16, 2009. It debuted on the Disney Channel on November 29, 2009. In its first two months of release, DVD sales brought in about $50 million in revenue for 3.25 million units sold.

== Reception ==
On the review aggregator website Rotten Tomatoes, 100% of 5 critics' reviews are positive.

== Video game ==
Disney Fairies: Tinker Bell and the Lost Treasure
- Developers: Hyde, Inc.
- Publisher: Disney Interactive Studios
- Platforms: Nintendo DS, Leapster
- Release: October 27, 2009
- Genre: Adventure
- Modes: Single-player, multiplayer

Disney Fairies: Tinker Bell and the Lost Treasure is an adventure game for the Nintendo DS. Like the previous game, the player plays as Tinker Bell in a free-roaming Pixie Hollow, using the touch screen to maneuver the character, move to other maps and play various minigames. The player must, for example, touch an arrow on the screen to move to another map or characters to speak to them. The touchscreen is used in the item repair minigames as well. For example, the player must trace the pattern of a groove to clear it or rub the item to clean stains. The DS microphone is used to create wind to loosen leaves and petals or blow dust from an item being repaired. The highest rank on 'Tinker Bell' is Champion of the Craft.

Different gameplay mechanics can also be acquired in-game, which require specific use of the touchscreen. These include:

- the ability to glow by holding the stylus directly above Tinker Bell. This can be used to reveal hidden items.
- drawing a circle on-screen to perform a somersault. Used to collect falling items.
- drawing a triangular shape on-screen to awaken plants throughout the game.
- petting or tickling insects. Used to collect lost insects and awaken sleeping insects. Can also be used on random insects that roam about the maps. Items will be awarded.

Also present in the game is a "Friendship Meter", which serves as an indicator to measure the player's relationship with other characters. It can be filled by presenting the respective character with their favorite item, accomplishing tasks or even simply speaking to them. The meter can also be depleted, however, by not speaking to the character for extended periods of time, giving an unwanted gift or missing a repair deadline.

Features:

- Create unique dresses, outfits and accessories
- Mini-games, such as catching dew drops, painting ladybugs and collecting threads from sleeping silkworms
- Multiplayer modes
- DGamer functionality
- Pixie Hollow integration

== Other media ==
A 32-page interactive digital children's book was released by Disney Digital Books in September 2009.

== Additional sequels ==
Four additional sequels titled Tinker Bell and the Great Fairy Rescue, Secret of the Wings, The Pirate Fairy, and Tinker Bell and the Legend of the NeverBeast were released.
