= Tinker Bell (film series) =

Animated fantasy film series produced by DisneyToon Studios

Tinker Bell Disney Fairies film series
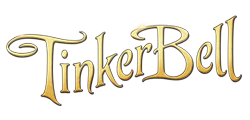
- Directed by: Bradley Raymond (1 & 3); Klay Hall (2); Peggy Holmes (4 & 5); Steve Loter (6)
- Starring: Mae Whitman; Lucy Liu; Raven-Symoné; Pamela Adlon; (More)
- Music by: Joel McNeely (1–6)
- Production company: DisneyToon Studios
- Distributed by: Walt Disney Studios; Home Entertainment
- Running time: 515 minutes (6 films)
- Country: United States
- Language: English

Tinker Bell is an American CGI-animated fantasy film series based on the character Tinker Bell, produced by DisneyToon Studios as part of the Disney Fairies franchise after producing a number of direct-to-video follow-ups and Winnie the Pooh films. Voices of Mae Whitman, Lucy Liu, Raven-Symoné, America Ferrera, Kristin Chenoweth and Pamela Adlon are featured in the films. The franchise follows the early adventures of Tinker Bell and her many friends in the land of Pixie Hollow.

Six feature films were produced: Tinker Bell (2008), Tinker Bell and the Lost Treasure (2009), Tinker Bell and the Great Fairy Rescue (2010), Secret of the Wings (2012), The Pirate Fairy (2014), and Tinker Bell and the Legend of the NeverBeast (2015). A television special: Pixie Hollow Games (2011) and a short film: Pixie Hollow Bake Off (2013) were also produced. The series is a spin-off of and prequel to Peter Pan. Originally developed as a direct-to-video franchise, the series was theatrically released from its third film onwards.

== Films ==
| Film | U.S. release date | Director(s) | Screenwriter(s) | Story by | Producer(s) |
|---|---|---|---|---|---|
| Tinker Bell | October 28, 2008 | Bradley Raymond | Jeffrey M. Howard | Jeffrey M. Howard and Bradley Raymond | Jeannine Roussel |
| Tinker Bell and the Lost Treasure | October 27, 2009 | Klay Hall | Evan Spiliotopoulos | Klay Hall and Evan Spiliotopoulos | Sean Lurie |
| Tinker Bell and the Great Fairy Rescue | September 21, 2010 | Bradley Raymond | Joe Ansolabehere, Paul Germain, Rob Muir and Bob Hilgenberg | Bradley Raymond and Jeffrey M. Howard | Helen Kalafatic and Margot Pipkin |
| Secret of the Wings | October 23, 2012 | Peggy Holmes | Bobs Gannaway, Peggy Holmes, Ryan Rowe and Tom Rogers | Bobs Gannaway, Peggy Holmes, Ryan Rowe and Tom Rogers | Makul Wigert |
| The Pirate Fairy | April 1, 2014 | Peggy Holmes | Jeffrey M. Howard and Kate Kondell | John Lasseter, Peggy Holmes, Bobs Gannaway, Lorna Cook and Craig Gerber | Jenni Magee-Cook |
| Tinker Bell and the Legend of the NeverBeast | March 3, 2015 | Steve Loter | Tom Rogers, Robert Schooley, Mark McCorkle and Kate Kondell | Steve Loter and Tom Rogers | Makul Wigert |

Tinker Bell story chronology
- Tinker Bell (2008)
- Tinker Bell and the Lost Treasure (2009)
- Tinker Bell and the Great Fairy Rescue (2010)
- Pixie Hollow Games (2011)
- Secret of the Wings (2012)
- Pixie Hollow Bake Off (2013)
- The Pirate Fairy (2014)
- Tinker Bell and the Legend of the NeverBeast (2015)

=== Tinker Bell (2008) ===
Tinker Bell (Mae Whitman) is born from the first laugh of a baby and is brought by the winds to Pixie Hollow (which is part of the island of Never Land). She learns that her talent is to be one of the tinkers, the fairies who make and fix things. Two other tinker fairies, Bobble (Rob Paulsen) and Clank (Jeff Bennett) teach her their craft and tell her about the fairies who visit the mainland to bring each season. Tink is thrilled and can't wait to go to the mainland for spring. She befriends a water fairy named Silvermist (Lucy Liu); a light fairy named Iridessa (Raven-Symoné); a garden fairy named Rosetta (Kristin Chenoweth), and an animal fairy named Fawn (America Ferrera). She also meets a proud fast-flying fairy named Vidia (Pamela Adlon), who immediately dislikes her because of her unusually strong talent. Tinker Bell soon learns from Queen Clarion (Anjelica Huston) that only nature-talent fairies visit the mainland.

Desperate to help change the seasons in the mainland, Tink tries her hand at other talents. This leads to disaster as Tink accidentally destroys all the preparations for spring. After seeing the destruction she caused, Tink decides to run, but after talking with the dust-keeper Terence (Jesse McCartney) about how important his job is, she realizes the importance of a tinker. Tinker Bell uses Lost Things to invent machines that quicken the process of doing tedious tasks, such as decorating flowers, painting bugs, planting seeds, etc. This allows the other fairies to get back on schedule, thus saving the arrival of spring. Queen Clarion allows Tink to join the nature-talent fairies when they bring spring to the mainland.

=== Tinker Bell and the Lost Treasure (2009) ===
Tinker Bell (Mae Whitman) is entrusted with making sure their magical moonstone keeps their pixie dust in plentiful supply. But tragedy strikes when Tinker Bell fumbles this important task, accidentally breaking the moonstone. In order to get it back into one piece, Tinker Bell embarks on a journey away from Neverland in order to find an enchanted mirror, with a little assistance from her best friend Terence (Jesse McCartney).

=== Tinker Bell and the Great Fairy Rescue (2010) ===
During her first summer on the mainland, Tinker Bell (Mae Whitman) gets kidnapped by Lizzy (Lauren Mote), a young girl with a steadfast belief in the power of pixie dust and the magic land of fairies. Tink develops a special bond with her. Meanwhile, Vidia (Pamela Adlon) leads her fellow fairies Iridessa (Raven-Symoné), Silvermist (Lucy Liu), Rosetta (Kristin Chenoweth), Fawn (Angela Bartys), Clank (Jeff Bennett) and Bobble (Rob Paulsen) on a daring rescue to rescue Tinker Bell.

=== Secret of the Wings (2012) ===
Secret of the Wings (originally titled Tinker Bell and the Mysterious Winter Woods) was released on DVD on October 23, 2012. Tinker Bell (Mae Whitman) crosses over to the forbidden area in Winter Woods, where it is always winter. While there her wings begin to sparkle so she sets off on a quest to discover why. She is overjoyed to learn that her wings sparkled because she was close to her sister, Periwinkle (Lucy Hale). They were born when a baby's laugh split in two. They visit for a few hours before Tinker Bell is told she has to leave. Determined to help her sister visit Pixie Hollow, she crafts a contraption that grates snow to keep Peri cold during her visit. The device malfunctions badly, causing a freeze to slowly envelop Pixie Hollow.

Tinker Bell flies to Winter Woods to get Periwinkle and her friends to help save Pixie Hollow. They realize that frost protects the trees in Winter Woods from the cold, so the winter fairies all work together to frost the trees of Pixie Hollow to save them from the accelerating freeze. They learn, however, that when Tink crashed in Winter Woods she tore her wing, and broken wings can't be repaired. But when Tink and Peri come together their wings again sparkle, and they learn that identical wings can heal each other, so they restore Tink's broken wing. They also discover that winter fairies can frost the wings of warm-weather fairies, keeping them from breaking in the cold, thus allowing them to visit their friends in Winter Woods.

=== The Pirate Fairy (2014) ===
Another feature-length film, titled The Pirate Fairy, (originally titled Quest for the Queen) was released on April 1, 2014. The film was originally scheduled for Fall 2013, but another DisneyToon Studios film, Planes, took its place. A trailer for the film was released on the Secret of the Wings Blu-ray and DVD on October 23, 2012. It was directed by the Secret of the Wings director, Peggy Holmes. The film introduced new characters, Zarina, voiced by Christina Hendricks, and James aka Captain Hook, voiced by Tom Hiddleston. Carlos Ponce also voiced one of the characters in the film.

When a dust-keeper fairy named Zarina steals Pixie Hollow's all-important Blue Pixie Dust and flies away to join forces with the pirates of Skull Rock, Tinker Bell and her fairy friends must embark on the adventure of a lifetime to return it to its rightful place. However, in the midst of their pursuit of Zarina, Tink's world is turned upside down. She and her friends find that their respective talents have been switched and they have to race against time to retrieve the Blue Pixie Dust and return home to save Pixie Hollow.

=== Tinker Bell and the Legend of the NeverBeast (2015) ===
Tinker Bell and the Legend of the NeverBeast was released in theaters in selected markets from March 2015, and was released direct-to-video in the United States on March 3, 2015. It was directed by Steve Loter and produced by Makul Wigert. Composer Joel McNeely returned to the film. Mae Whitman, Lucy Liu, Raven-Symoné, Megan Hilty, Pamela Adlon and Anjelica Huston reprise their roles of Tinker Bell, Silvermist, Iridessa, Rosetta, Vidia, and Queen Clarion. Ginnifer Goodwin replaces Angela Bartys as the voice of Fawn in this film. Rosario Dawson and Olivia Holt join the cast as new characters Nyx and Morgan, respectively.

When Fawn meets a legendary creature, the Neverbeast, she befriends the creature in no time. But when she learns that the creature could be part of a terrible event, she will have to trust her instincts in order to save her new friend and all of Pixie Hollow.

== Unreleased films ==
=== Scrapped first film ===
The early draft for the first Tinker Bell film, alternatively titled Tinker Bell and the Ring of Belief in unreleased promotional material, designed Tinker Bell and her friends traveling to the mainland to restore children’s belief in fairies. In addition, the film would also show how Tinker Bell met Peter Pan and encountered a young girl from an orphanage in London. Captain Hook, the pirates, and the Lost Boys were also planned to be featured in the film as key factors. Trailers of the original film were included in several Disney DVD releases, with the initial release date being 2007. Due to budget constraints and the film being deemed "virtually unwatchable", the script underwent many rewrites and 90% of the completed prototype film is scrapped. The film ended up being delayed to 2008 with an entirely new storyline.

=== Tinker Academy ===
Disney also had plans for a seventh film. The title of the film was Tinker Bell: Tinker Academy, and the story was to center around Tinker Bell going to the titular school and meeting a new group of fairies called City Tinkers, with the most prominent one being a fairy named Ember. In April 2014, The Hollywood Reporter stated that the film was canceled due to story problems.

=== Tink Meets Peter ===
On August 28, 2022, Stephen Anderson stated on Twitter about working on an eighth Tinker Bell film with Dan Abraham in late 2014/early 2015. The working title of the film was Tink Meets Peter. It was intended to be the final installment in the Tinker Bell film series and a direct prequel to Walt Disney's 1953 film, Peter Pan. The storyline would show how Peter came to Neverland, the genesis of Peter and Tink's relationship, how Peter cut off Hook's hand, etc. The film was under production during the time home video marketing was plummeting and was cancelled after DisneyToon Studios' closure on June 28, 2018.

== Live-action TV series ==
In 2015, it was announced that Tink, a live-action film, with Reese Witherspoon playing Tinker Bell and Victoria Strouse writing the script, was in development. In 2020, the development on the project was in question following the casting of Yara Shahidi as Tinker Bell in Peter Pan & Wendy. In 2021, the project re-entered development as a part of Gary Marsh's overall deal with Disney. Witherspoon was still attached to the project as a producer and Maria Melnik (Escape Room) was hired to rewrite the script. In 2026, it was announced that the project is being retooled into a TV series for Disney+ with Liz Heldens and Bridget Carpenter serving as writers and executive producers.

== Short films ==
=== Pixie Hollow Games (2011) ===
Originally planned to feature the entire ensemble cast of the earlier films in Olympic-style games spanning the four seasons, presumably due to the original plot vetoed by the producers, the story was scaled back into a shorter scenario focusing primarily on Rosetta (Megan Hilty, replacing Kristin Chenoweth) and a new fairy character, Chloe (Brenda Song). They are teamed up against Rosetta's will representing the "garden fairies" in a competition in which they hope to unseat the undefeated "storm fairies". They overcome their differences and Rosetta's fear of getting dirty, to emerge victorious at the end of the games.

=== Pixie Hollow Bake Off (2013) ===
A six-minute short film, titled Pixie Hollow Bake Off, aired in the United Kingdom on October 20, 2013, on Disney Channel. Lisa Faulkner provided a voice for a baking fairy named Gelata.

The short was released in the United States as a bonus DVD in a Walmart-exclusive edition of The Pirate Fairy on Blu-ray Disc, but with Giada De Laurentiis as the voice of Gelata. In July 2014 the short was made available on the digital movie service Disney Movies Anywhere.

== Theme songs ==
| Year | Film | Theme song | Recording artist(s) |
|---|---|---|---|
| 2008 | Tinker Bell | "Fly to Your Heart" | Selena Gomez |
| 2009 | Tinker Bell and the Lost Treasure | "Gift of a Friend" | Demi Lovato |
| 2010 | Tinker Bell and the Great Fairy Rescue | "How to Believe" | Holly Brook |
| 2011 | Pixie Hollow Games | "Dig Down Deeper" | Zendaya |
| 2012 | Secret of the Wings | "The Great Divide" | McClain Sisters |
| 2014 | The Pirate Fairy | "Who I Am" | Natasha Bedingfield |
| 2015 | Tinker Bell and the Legend of the NeverBeast | "1,000 Years" | Bleu & KT Tunstall |

== Reception ==
=== Critical reception ===
| Film | Rotten Tomatoes |
|---|---|
| Tinker Bell | 90% (10 reviews) |
| Tinker Bell and the Lost Treasure | 100% (5 reviews) |
| Tinker Bell and the Great Fairy Rescue | 70% (10 reviews) |
| Secret of the Wings | 62% (21 reviews) |
| The Pirate Fairy | 81% (21 reviews) |
| Tinker Bell and the Legend of the NeverBeast | 75% (20 reviews) |

=== Commercial performance ===
According to The Hollywood Reporter, the first four full-length films (Tinker Bell, Tinker Bell and the Lost Treasure, Tinker Bell and the Great Fairy Rescue, and Secret of the Wings) were made for $30 million to $35 million.

| Film | Release date | Revenue | | | Budget | Reference |
| Film | Release date | Media sales in North America | Box office outside North America | Worldwide | Budget | Reference |
|---|---|---|---|---|---|---|
| Tinker Bell | October 28, 2008 | $66 million | $9 million | $75 million | $30–$35 million | |
| Tinker Bell and the Lost Treasure | October 27, 2009 | $64 million | $9 million | $73 million | $30–$35 million | |
| Tinker Bell and the Great Fairy Rescue | September 21, 2010 | $55 million | $10 million | $65 million | $30–$35 million | |
| Secret of the Wings | October 23, 2012 | $67 million | $67 million | $134 million | $30–$35 million | |
| The Pirate Fairy | April 1, 2014 | $32 million | $64 million | $96 million | —N/a | |
| Tinker Bell and the Legend of the NeverBeast | March 3, 2015 | $18 million | $32 million | $50 million | —N/a | |
| Total | | $302 million | $191 million | $493 million | $120–$140 million | —N/a |

== Characters ==
- Tinker Bell (voiced by Mae Whitman) is a talented tinker fairy and Peter Pan’s closest friend and sidekick. Before meeting Peter, Tinker Bell was born in the fairyland, Pixie Hollow in Neverland, and has many adventures with her fairy friends. In Secret of the Wings, Tinker Bell learns she has a sister named Periwinkle.
- Silvermist (voiced by Lucy Liu) is a water fairy and is of East-Asian descent.
- Iridessa (voiced by Raven-Symoné) is a light fairy and is of African descent.
- Rosetta (voiced by Kristin Chenoweth from 2008 to 2010, and Megan Hilty from 2011 to 2015) is a garden fairy and speaks with a Southern accent.
- Fawn (voiced by America Ferrera in 2008, Angela Bartys from 2009 to 2014, and Ginnifer Goodwin in 2015) is an animal fairy and is of Latin descent.
- Vidia (voiced by Pamela Adlon) is a fast-flying fairy. She was originally jealous of Tinker Bell, but later becomes close friends with her.
- Periwinkle (voiced by Lucy Hale) is an ice fairy, Tinker Bell's sister, and of Scandinavian descent.
- Zarina (voiced by Christina Hendricks) is a dust fairy and alchemist. She is a pirate and has Scottish ancestry.
- Clank (voiced by Jeff Bennett) is a tinker sparrow man and Bobble’s best friend.
- Bobble (voiced by Rob Paulsen) is a tinker sparrow man and Clank’s best friend.
- Terence (voiced by Jesse McCartney) is a dust-keeper sparrow man and Tinker Bell’s best friend.

== Crew ==
| Crew | Film | | | | | | Television special | Short film |
| Crew | Tinker Bell (2008) | The Lost Treasure (2009) | The Great Fairy Rescue (2010) | Secret of the Wings (2012) | The Pirate Fairy (2014) | The Legend of the NeverBeast (2015) | Pixie Hollow Games (2011) | Pixie Hollow Bake Off (2013) |
|---|---|---|---|---|---|---|---|---|
| Director(s) | Bradley Raymond | Klay Hall | Bradley Raymond | Peggy Holmes Co-Director: Bobs Gannaway | Peggy Holmes | Steve Loter | Bradley Raymond | Elliot M. Bour |
| Producer(s) | Jeannine Roussel | Sean Lurie | Helen Kalafatic; Margot Pipkin | Makul Wigert | Jenni Magee-Cook | Makul Wigert | Helen Kalafatic | Jan Hirota |
| Executive producer | John Lasseter | John Lasseter | John Lasseter | John Lasseter | John Lasseter | John Lasseter | John Lasseter | John Lasseter |
| Screenwriter(s) | Jeffrey M. Howard | Evan Spiliotopoulos | Joe Ansolabehere; Paul Germain; Rob Muir; Bob Hilgenberg | Bobs Gannaway; Peggy Holmes; Ryan Rowe; Tom Rogers | Jeffrey M. Howard; Kate Kondell | Tom Rogers; Robert Schooley; Mark McCorkle; Kate Kondell | Jeffrey M. Howard | Kate Kondell |
| Story by | Jeffrey M. Howard; Bradley Raymond | Klay Hall; Evan Spiliotopoulos | Bradley Raymond; Jeffrey M. Howard | Bobs Gannaway; Peggy Holmes; Ryan Rowe; Tom Rogers | John Lasseter; Peggy Holmes; Bobs Gannaway; Lorna Cook; Craig Gerber | Steve Loter; Tom Rogers | Jeffrey M. Howard | Kate Kondell |
| Composer | Joel McNeely | Joel McNeely | Joel McNeely | Joel McNeely | Joel McNeely | Joel McNeely | Joel McNeely | Zain Effendi |
| Editor | Mark Rosenbaum | Jeremy Milton | Mark Rosenbaum | Mark Rosenbaum | Anna Catalano | Margaret Hou | Margaret Hou | Lisa Linder |
| Production company | DisneyToon Studios | DisneyToon Studios | DisneyToon Studios | DisneyToon Studios | DisneyToon Studios | DisneyToon Studios | DisneyToon Studios | Disneytoon Studios; Arc Productions |
| Distributor | Walt Disney Studios Home Entertainment | Walt Disney Studios Home Entertainment | Walt Disney Studios Home Entertainment | Walt Disney Studios Home Entertainment | Walt Disney Studios Home Entertainment | Walt Disney Studios Home Entertainment | Walt Disney Studios Home Entertainment | Walt Disney Studios Home Entertainment |
| Running time | 78 minutes | 82 minutes | 79 minutes | 75 minutes | 78 minutes | 76 minutes | 23 minutes | 6 minutes |
| Release date | 28 October 2008 | 27 October 2009 | 21 September 2010 | 23 October 2012 | 1 April 2014 | 3 March 2015 | 19 November 2011 | 20 October 2013 |

== See also ==
- FernGully: The Last Rainforest
- FernGully 2: The Magical Rescue
- Epic
- Arrietty
