= Tinker Bell and the Great Fairy Rescue =

- DVD cover
- Directed by: Bradley Raymond
- Screenplay by: Joe Ansolabehere; Paul Germain; Bob Hilgenberg; Rob Muir
- Story by: Bradley Raymond; Jeffrey M. Howard
- Based on: Tinker Bell by J. M. Barrie
- Produced by: Helen Kalafatic; Margot Pipkin
- Starring: Mae Whitman; Lauren Mote; Michael Sheen; Pamela Adlon; Lucy Liu; Raven-Symoné; Kristin Chenoweth; Angela Bartys
- Narrated by: Cara Dillon
- Edited by: Mark Rosenbaum
- Music by: Joel McNeely
- Production companies: Walt Disney Pictures; Disneytoon Studios
- Distributed by: Walt Disney Studios; Home Entertainment (United States); Walt Disney Studios; Motion Pictures (International)
- Release dates: July 23, 2010 (Poland); September 21, 2010 (United States)
- Running time: 76 minutes
- Country: United States
- Language: English
- Budget: $30-$35 million
- Box office: $10.87 million

Tinker Bell and the Great Fairy Rescue is a 2010 American animated fantasy adventure film and the third installment of the Disney Fairies franchise produced by Disneytoon Studios. It revolves around Tinker Bell, a fairy character created by J. M. Barrie for his 1904 play Peter Pan, or The Boy Who Wouldn't Grow Up, and featured in subsequent adaptations, especially in Disney's animated works. Animated by Prana Studios, the film was produced using digital 3D modeling. In the film, Tinker Bell is kidnapped and befriends a human girl on the mainland, while her friends band together to find and rescue her. Unlike the other films in the series, it takes place entirely away from Pixie Hollow.

It was released on DVD and Blu-ray by Walt Disney Studios Home Entertainment on September 21, 2010. The film was followed by a television special, Pixie Hollow Games and three more sequels, beginning with Secret of the Wings in 2012.

== Plot ==
Tinker Bell and her friends attend a summer fairy camp in England. Out of curiosity, Tinker Bell goes to visit the nearby human house, followed by Vidia. At the same moment, Dr. Griffiths and his daughter, Elizabeth "Lizzy" arrive at the house, their summer home. Lizzy leaves out a hand-made fairy house, which Tinker Bell is fascinated by and enters, despite Vidia's constant warnings. In an attempt to shock Tink, Vidia slams the door shut, accidentally jamming it. When Lizzy returns, Vidia tries to free Tinker Bell to no avail, resulting in Lizzy discovering her and taking her home. Lizzy attempts to show Tinker Bell to her father, but he is too busy. Seeing all the butterflies he has pinned on display for research, Lizzy decides to keep Tinker Bell a secret.

In her room, Lizzy reveals her love for fairies to Tinker Bell and her desire to have a friend. Complimented by Lizzy's fascination, Tinker Bell decides to teach her about fairies; Lizzy records all the information in a blank field journal given to her by her father and they form a friendship. As the rain dies down, they say goodbye; Tinker Bell prepares to leave, while Lizzy runs downstairs to show her father her research. However, Tinker Bell sees that Lizzy's father is too busy dealing with many leaks in the ceiling to pay attention. Tinker Bell spends the night fixing the leaks so Dr. Griffiths can spend more time with his daughter. When she finishes, she releases a captive butterfly that, unknown to her, Dr. Griffiths had intended to show to a museum committee in London.

Meanwhile, Vidia mobilizes Rosetta, Iridessa, Fawn, Silvermist, Clank and Bobble to rescue Tinker Bell. Due to their inability to fly in the rain, the group built a boat to sail to the house. Despite smooth sailing at first, the boat encounters a waterfall and crashes, forcing the party to proceed on foot. On the way, Vidia confesses that it was her fault that Tinker Bell was kidnapped, but they forgive her and tell her it would have been worse if she had not been there at all.

The next morning, Lizzy is excited to hear that the leaks have stopped. She runs down to show her father her research, but instead, he blames her for the missing butterfly and sends her back to her room, dismissing her steadfast belief in the existence of fairies. To make it up to her, Tinker Bell teaches Lizzy to fly with pixie dust, but the commotion brings her father upstairs. Dr. Griffiths sternly demands the truth, and Lizzy confesses in tears about Tinker Bell, but Dr. Griffiths still refuses to believe in fairies. Outraged, Tinker Bell bursts out of her hiding place and lashes out at Lizzy's father, much to his surprise.

At the same moment, the rescue party arrives at the house. While the rest of them distract Lizzy's cat named Mr. Twitches, Vidia climbs upstairs to find Tinker Bell. Seeing Dr. Griffiths about to capture her in a jar, Vidia quickly bumps Tinker Bell out of the way and gets caught instead. Ignoring Lizzy's pleas, her father unknowingly takes Vidia and drives to London to show his discovery to the museum committee. Lizzy, with the help of Tinker Bell and the other fairies, takes flight in the sky and pursues her father to London.

Flying ahead, Tinker Bell tampers with the car's engine, causing it to stop and allowing Lizzy to catch up. Lizzy pleads with her father not to take Vidia, and Dr. Griffiths finally listens to his daughter, apologizing for not believing her. Vidia is freed, and Lizzy and the fairies teach her father to fly, and they all return home. The next day, Lizzy and her father have a picnic with the fairies outside the fairy camp tree, reading Lizzy's field journal.

== Voice cast ==
- Mae Whitman as Tinker Bell, a tinker fairy.
- Lauren Mote as Elizabeth "Lizzy" Griffiths, a 9-year-old human girl with a British accent who loves fairies.
- Michael Sheen as Dr. Griffiths, a constantly preoccupied scientist and Lizzy's loving but firm widowed father who doesn't believe in fairies.
- Pamela Adlon as Vidia, a fast-flying fairy.
- Lucy Liu as Silvermist, a water fairy.
- Raven-Symoné as Iridessa, a light fairy.
- Kristin Chenoweth as Rosetta, a garden fairy.
- Angela Bartys as Fawn, an animal fairy.
- Rob Paulsen as Bobble, a wispy tinker sparrow man with large glasses and the best friend of Clank.
- Jeff Bennett as Clank, a large tinker sparrow man with a booming voice, and the Driver.
- Jesse McCartney as Terence, a pixie dust keeper and Tink's best friend.
- Cara Dillon as the Narrator
- Faith Prince as Mrs. Perkins, Lizzy and Dr. Griffiths' neighbor.
- Bob Bergen as Cheese the mouse and additional voices.

== Music ==
The score to the film was composed and conducted by Joel McNeely, who scored the first two Tinker Bell films. In addition, the following songs were written for the film:

No.	Title	Writer(s)	Performer(s)	Length
1.	"Summer's Just Begun"	Brendan Milburn & Valerie Vigoda	Cara Dillon
2.	"How to Believe"	Adam Iscove	Holly Brook (Note: There is another version of this song performed by Bridgit Mendler.)
3.	"Come Flying with Me"	Brendan Milburn & Valerie Vigoda	Cara Dillon

== Release ==
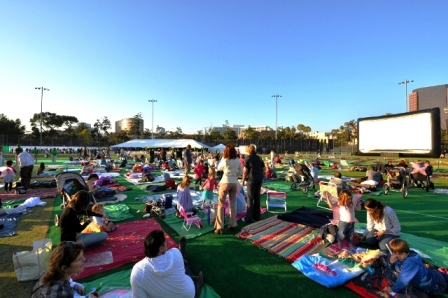
The film's American premiere at La Cienega Park, where it was shown on an inflatable movie screen.

In the United Kingdom and Ireland, the film was released in theaters on August 13, 2010, following a premiere held at the May Fair Hotel in London on August 8, attended by Lauren Mote."

In the United States, the film had an outdoor premiere on August 28, 2010, as part of the Outdoor Cinema Food Fest at La Cienega Park in Beverly Hills, California. Between September 3 and 19, 2010, the film was shown at the El Capitan Theatre, in order to make it eligible for the Academy Award for Best Animated Feature. Disney qualified the film in an unsuccessful effort to expand the category's final nominations from three to five, as, under the Academy rules in effect that year, five films could only have been nominated in a calendar year in which 16 or more animated films were submitted.

The film was released in the United States on DVD and Blu-ray on September 21, 2010. Like the previous two films, Great Fairy Rescue debuted on the Disney Channel in November 20, 2010.

=== Video game ===
Disney Fairies: Tinker Bell and the Great Fairy Rescue
- Developer: Jupiter Corporation
- Publisher: Disney Interactive Studios
- Platform: Nintendo DS
- Release: September 22, 2010
- Genre: Adventure
- Modes: Single-player, multiplayer

Disney Fairies: Tinker Bell and the Great Fairy Rescue is an adventure game for the Nintendo DS. Unlike the previous games, in which the player played as Tinker Bell, they instead play as a fairy created by the player. The game focuses on the Mainland around Lizzy's house, using the touch screen to maneuver the character and play various minigames. The player must, for example, touch an arrow on the screen to move to another map or characters to speak to them.

==== Features ====
- Mini-games
- Multiplayer modes
- DGamer functionality

=== International distribution ===
Television:

- UK: Disney Cinemagic (April 2011), Channel 5 (August 12, 2012)

== Reception ==
On the review aggregator website Rotten Tomatoes, 70% of 10 critics' reviews are positive.

In Irish cinemas, on its opening weekend the film ranked at number #10, behind Toy Story 3, Knight and Day, Inception, Step Up 3D, The A-Team, The Last Airbender, The Sorcerer's Apprentice, Cats & Dogs: The Revenge of Kitty Galore, and The Karate Kid, and grossed €30,174 in its first week.
