= Tinker Bell (Disney character) =

Disney character

- Disney's Peter Pan / Disney Fairies character
- First appearance: Peter Pan (1953)
- Created by: Walt Disney; Marc Davis
- Based on: Tinker Bell by J. M. Barrie
- Portrayed by: Yara Shahidi (Note: Peter Pan & Wendy)
- Voiced by: Mae Whitman (Note: Tinker Bell (film series))

In-universe information
- Nicknames: Tink, Miss Bell
- Species: Fairy
- Gender: Female
- Occupation: Tinker fairy
- Family: Periwinkle (twin sister)
- Home: Hangman's Tree, Neverland (Note: Peter Pan franchise); Pixie Hollow, Neverland (Note: Disney Fairies franchise)

Tinker Bell is a fictional fairy based on the same name character created in 1904 by Scottish novelist and playwright J. M. Barrie, and one of the most popular characters adapted for film and television by the Walt Disney Company. She first appeared in Disney Animation's 1953 film, Peter Pan, and has since become a widely recognized unofficial mascot of Disney, next to the company's official mascot Mickey Mouse. She is recognized as "a symbol of 'the magic of Disney'".

== Adaptation and development by Disney ==
As with previous Disney animated films, a live-action version was filmed to serve as an aid to animators with the actors performing to a prerecorded dialogue track. Actress Margaret Kerry received a call to audition to serve as the live-action reference for Tinker Bell.

There is a myth that the original animated version of Tinker Bell was modelled after Marilyn Monroe. However, Disney animator Marc Davis's primary reference was Kerry. He illustrated Tinker Bell as an attractive, blonde blue-eyed young white female, with an exaggerated hourglass figure. She is dressed in a bright green strapless dress and wears green slippers with white puffs. A trail of pixie dust follows her when she moves.

Davis' first model for the character was 19-year-old Ginni Mack, who had previously been used as the face of the company's Ink and Paint Department for promotional material, and served as a facial expression model. For the character's body, Davis worked at first with Kathryn Beaumont, who had served as his model for Alice. Looking for someone more "adult" who was "sexy" and shapely they turned to Margaret Kerry, who had been named "World's Most Beautiful Legs" in Hollywood in 1949, and whose experience as a dancer helped convey the character's emotions.

Since 1954, Tinker Bell has featured as a hostess for much of Disney's live-action television programming and in every Disney film advertisements flying over Disneyland with her magic wand and her fairy dust, beginning with Disneyland (which first introduced the theme park to the public while it was still under construction), to Walt Disney Presents, Walt Disney's Wonderful World of Color, and The Wonderful World of Disney. In 1988, she appeared in the final shot of the ending scene of Who Framed Roger Rabbit, along with Porky Pig; sprinkling fairy dust on the screen after Porky's trademark farewell as it goes black prior to the closing credits. She also starred alongside other Disney characters, such as Chip 'n' Dale, in many Disney comics, where she was also able to speak. Tinker Bell also appears as a healing summon in the Kingdom Hearts series of video games and the card appearance in the video game Mickey's Memory Challenge in 1993.

=== Peter Pan films ===
==== Animated films ====
In Walt Disney's 1953 film version of Peter Pan, The Pixie has blonde hair put up in a neat bun featuring side-swept bangs, and sky-blue tinged translucent wings. She wears a short, strapless green dress paired with matching flats, each foot with two white pom poms. She doesn't speak, but as in the original play, Peter translates her communications verbally for the sake of the audience, and the sounds of a ringing bell heard when she makes gestures.

The 1953 animated version of Tinker Bell never actually used a wand. In the picture and the official Disney Character Archives, she is referred to as a Pixie.

In the sequel, Peter's arch-nemesis, Captain Hook kidnaps Wendy Darling's daughter Jane, mistaking her for Wendy, and takes her to Neverland, After Peter rescues her, he takes her to his hideout to be the mother of the Lost Boys as Wendy once was, but Jane refuses and angrily snaps at them and proclaims her disbelief in fairies, causing Tinker Bell to not fly and her light starts to fade.

The Lost Boys teach Jane how to act like a Lost Boy, hoping to get her to believe in fairies and save Tinker Bell's life, inadvertently alerting the pirates, who capture the boys and expose Jane as their accomplice. Jane tries to convince Peter that it was a misunderstanding, but he berates her for her deception and reveals that her disbelief in fairies is causing Tinker Bell's light to fade.

Horrified, Jane runs back to the hideout to find Tinker Bell's body. Jane is devastated, thinking the fairy is long gone for good, but with Jane's new beliefs, Tinker Bell is brought back to life. They head to the ship and see Hook forcing Peter to walk the plank. With Tinker Bell's help, Jane learns to fly. As Peter uses the anchor to sink the ship, the pirates, riding on a rowboat, are pursued by the octopus. After saying goodbye to the boys, Peter escorts Jane back home, where she reconciles with Wendy and Danny. Peter and Tinker Bell meet with Wendy again, then fly back to Neverland as Edward returns home and reunites with his family.

==== Live action remake ====
Yara Shahidi portrays Tinker Bell in the 2023 live-action film Peter Pan & Wendy, which adapts some elements from the 1953 animated film. Unlike the original story and the animated film, she is not banished by Peter and she is not shown to be jealous of Wendy, but instead befriends her. In this version, Tinker Bell speaks fairy language that can be understood by anyone who can listen and is always barefoot. When Captain Hook and his pirates raid Peter Pan's lair, she flies after Peter after he was wounded by Captain Hook only to be bagged by Mr. Smee. Tinker Bell later breaks free when Captain Hook has Wendy walk the plank. By the end of the film, Tinker Bell is finally heard by Wendy as she thanks Wendy for being able to listen to her as she, Peter, and Captain Hook's ship return to Neverland.

=== Live action Tinker Bell film ===
In 2015, it was announced that Tink, a live-action film featuring the character was in development. Reese Witherspoon would be playing Tinker Bell and Victoria Strouse would be writing the script. In 2021, the project re-entered development as a part of Gary Marsh's overall deal with Disney. Witherspoon is still attached to the project as a producer and Maria Melnik (Escape Room) was hired to rewrite the script.

=== Disney Parks ===
Tinker Bell is a meetable character at all of the Disney Parks and Resorts, and alternates between Fantasyland and Adventureland. She is also featured in Peter Pan's Flight, a suspended dark ride based on the artwork from the animated film. Beginning in 1961, she was featured as a live performer who "flew" suspended from a wire from the top of the Matterhorn Bobsled Ride at the beginning of the nightly fireworks displays. She was played by 70-year-old former circus performer Tiny Kline until her retirement three years later for health reasons. Kline was followed for one summer by Mimi Zerbini, a 19-year-old French circus acrobat, then by Judy Kaye from 1966 to 1977, and by 27-year-old Gina Rock from 1983 to 2005. Patty Rock flew from 1985 to 1995 as Gina Rock's backup, then split the flying with Gina Rock until they both retired in 2005. That was the year the zipline from the Matterhorn became a pulley system that could make the performer go back and forth and up and down.

On the 2008 Walt Disney World Christmas Day Parade special on ABC, Disney announced that a Tinker Bell float would be added to the classic Disney's Electrical Parade at Disney California Adventure Park at the Disneyland Resort, the first new float to be added in decades.

At Disneyland, a Pixie Hollow meet-and-greet area opened on October 28, 2008, near the Matterhorn, where guests are able to interact with Tinker Bell and her companions. A similar area called "Tinker Bell's Magical Nook" is in Fantasyland at Walt Disney World's Magic Kingdom in Florida.

=== Disney Fairies ===
When the Disney Princess franchise was created in the early 2000s Tinker Bell was also part of the original line-up, but she was soon removed along with Esmeralda as it was decided that they were not suited for the brand. This led to the creation of the Disney Fairies in 2006, which expanded substantially upon the limited information the author gave about the fairies and their home of Never Land.

==== Tinker Bell film series ====
In addition to an extensive line of merchandise, series of films, specials and shorts based on the character was released between 2006 and 2015. In the films, Tinker Bell is a tinker fairy. Tinker Bell, who speaks in the Fairies universe, unlike her original appearances, is voiced by Mae Whitman in these features. The 2012 film Secret of the Wings introduces Tinker Bell's long-lost twin sister, Periwinkle.

== Reception ==
Tinker Bell has become one of Disney's most important branding icons for over half a century along with Jiminy Cricket, and Mickey Mouse, and is generally known as a symbol of the magic of Disney. She has been featured in television commercials and show opening credits sprinkling pixie dust with a wand to shower a magical feeling over various other Disney personalities, though the 1953 animated version of Tinker Bell never actually used a wand. In the picture and the official Disney Character Archives, she is referred to as a pixie.

=== Awards and honour ===
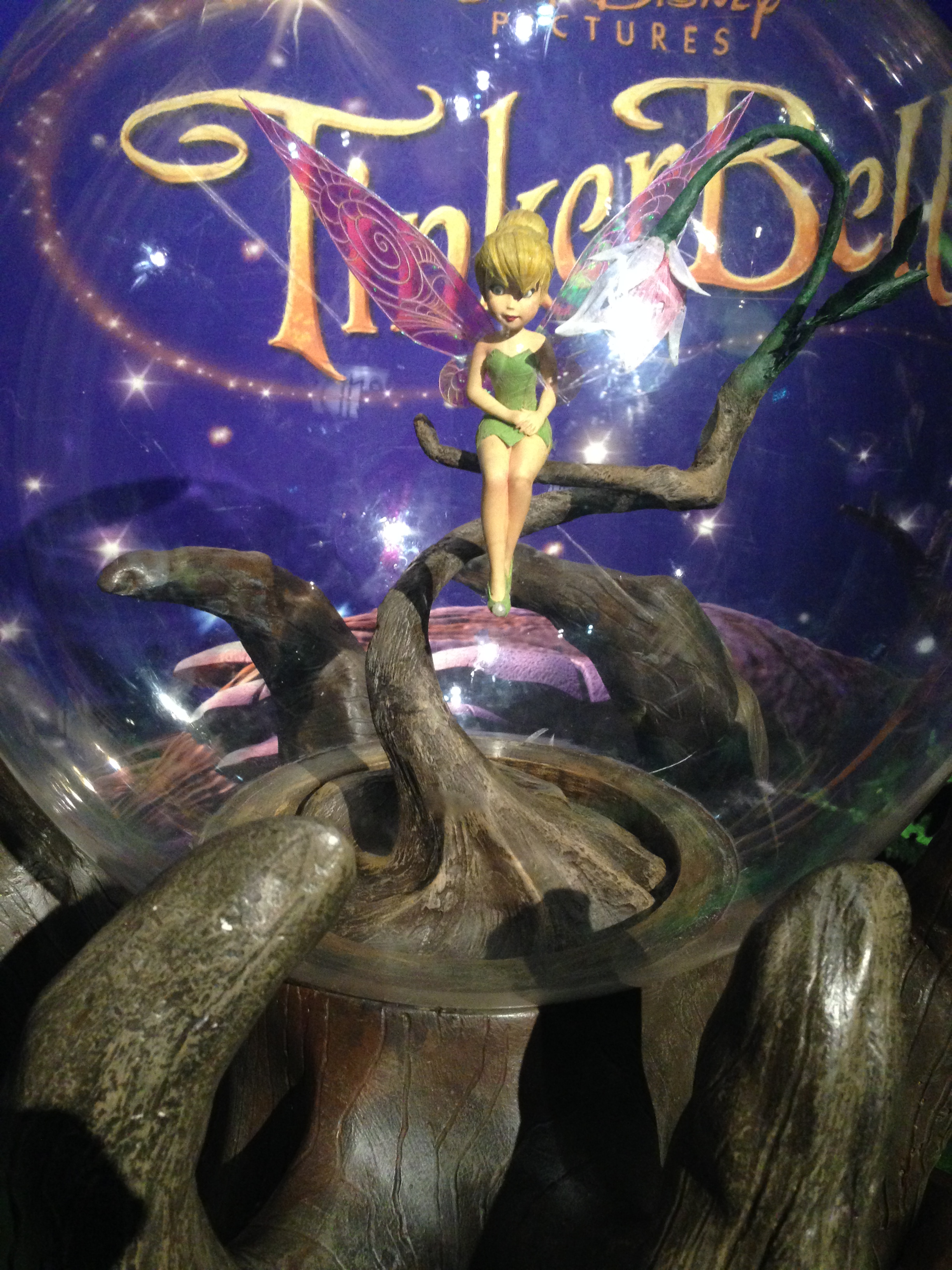
Waxwork of Tinker Bell at Madame Tussauds, London

In November 2009, Tinker Bell became the smallest waxwork ever to be made at Madame Tussauds, measuring only five and a half inches.

On September 21, 2010, Tinker Bell was honored with a star on the Hollywood Walk of Fame, being the fifth Disney character to receive one after Mickey Mouse, Snow White, Donald Duck, and Winnie the Pooh. The star is located on 6834 Hollywood Blvd.

== Filmography ==
She has been featured in television commercials and show opening credits sprinkling pixie dust with a wand to shower a magical feeling over various other Disney personalities.

=== Feature-length films ===
- Peter Pan (1953) (debut)
- Who Framed Roger Rabbit (1988) (cameo)
- Mickey's Magical Christmas: Snowed in at the House of Mouse (2001) (cameo)
- Return to Never Land (2002)
- Mickey's House of Villains (2002) (cameo)
- The Lizzie McGuire Movie (2003) (parody)
- The Lion King 1½ (2004) (cameo)
- Tinker Bell (2008)
- Tinker Bell and the Lost Treasure (2009)
- Tinker Bell and the Great Fairy Rescue (2010)
- Secret of the Wings (2012)
- Saving Mr. Banks (2013) (cameo)
- The Pirate Fairy (2014)
- Tinker Bell and the Legend of the NeverBeast (2015)
- Ralph Breaks the Internet (2018) (cameo)
- Peter Pan & Wendy (2023)

=== Television series ===
- In original anthology series (1954–1983) she appears in:
  - Various opening title sequences
  - The Disneyland Story (1954)
  - Your Host, Donald Duck (1957)
  - An Adventure in the Magic Kingdom (1958)
  - From All Of Us To All Of You (1958)
  - Fantasy on Skies (1962)
  - Holiday Time at Disneyland (1962)
  - The Disneyland 10th Anniversary show (1965)
  - Disneyland Around the Seasons (1966)
- The Wonderful World of Disney (1991–present)
- Jake and the Never Land Pirates (2011–16, guest appearance)

=== Short films ===
- Once Upon a Studio (2023)
