= Allison Saft =

American novelist (born 1993)

Allison Saft (born December 29, 1993) is an American novelist. She is best known for writing romantic fantasy novels.

== Early life and education ==
Saft was born in Philadelphia. After earning her master's degree in English literature from Tulane University, she relocated from the Gulf Coast to the West Coast.

== Career ==
Saft's debut novel, Down Comes the Night, was published in 2021 and gained attention for its gothic aesthetic and enemies-to-lovers romance. It received starred reviews from School Library Journal and Shelf Awareness and was #8 on the American Booksellers Association's Spring 2021 Kids' Indie Next List. Its audiobook version, narrated by Saskia Maarleveld, won an AudioFile Earphones Award.

Her novel A Far Wilder Magic (2022) was a New York Times bestseller and a March/April 2022 Kids' Indie Next Pick. Its audiobook version, narrated by Jesse Vilinksy, won an AudioFile Earphones Award. A Fragile Enchantment (2024) was a New York Times bestseller, a January/February #1 Kids' Indie Next Pick and a Barnes & Noble YA Book Club Pick. It also received a Publishers Weekly starred review.

A Dark and Drowning Tide (2024) was a USA Today bestseller, a LibraryReads top 10 pick, an October 2024 Indie Next Pick, and a Waterstones Best Romantasy Book of 2024. It was a Goodreads Choice Award nominee for Romantasy. Wings of Starlight (2025) was a #1 New York Times bestseller and a USA Today bestseller, as well as a March/April Kids' Indie Next Pick.

== Works ==
Title	Year
Down Comes the Night	2021
A Far Wilder Magic	2022
A Fragile Enchantment	2024
A Dark and Drowning Tide	2024
Wings of Starlight	2025
Immortal Game	2026
