= Pixie Hollow Bake Off =

- Written by: Kate Kondell
- Directed by: Elliot M. Bour
- Theme music composer: Zain Effendi
- Country of origin: United States
- Original language: English

Production
- Producer: Jan Hirota
- Editor: Lisa Linder
- Running time: 6 minutes
- Production companies: Disneytoon Studios; Arc Productions

Original release
- Network: Disney Channel
- Release: October 20, 2013

Pixie Hollow Bake Off is a six-minute short, based on the Disney Fairies franchise, produced by Disneytoon Studios. It aired in the United Kingdom on October 20, 2013, on Disney Channel.

== Plot ==
Tinker Bell challenges Gelata to see who can bake the best cake for Queen Clarion's Arrival Day party. There are a group of baking fairies, the main one being Gelata, who have been baking the exact same cake for the party for the last 399 years. Tinker Bell has an idea for a different kind of cake, which Gelata takes as a challenge, which leads to the bake off. Tinker Bell and her friends compete against the baking fairies. In the end, Tinker Bell’s cake looks very appealing, but finds out looks are not everything.

== Cast ==
- Mae Whitman as Tinker Bell
- Giada De Laurentis as Gelata (US Version)
- Lisa Faulkner as Gelata (UK Version)
- Lucy Liu as Silvermist
- Raven-Symoné as Iridessa
- Megan Hilty as Rosetta
- Pamela Adlon as Vidia
- Angela Bartys as Fawn
- Jeff Bennett as Clank / Fairy Gary
- Rob Paulsen as Bobble
- Jane Horrocks as Fairy Mary
- Anjelica Huston as Queen Clarion

== Release ==
The special debuted in the United Kingdom on The Disney Channel on October 20, 2013. It was later featured as an exclusive bonus disc accompanying the Blu-ray release of The Pirate Fairy in 2014, which included 10 extra mini-shorts of around 1–2 minutes. The special was released widely through Disney Movies Anywhere. This special made its US TV Debut on Disney Channel on August 9, 2014.
