= The Pirate Fairy =

2014 American animated fantasy film

- Theatrical release poster
- Directed by: Peggy Holmes
- Screenplay by: Jeffrey M. Howard; Kate Kondell
- Story by: John Lasseter; Peggy Holmes; Bobs Gannaway; Jeffrey M. Howard; Lorna Cook; Craig Gerber
- Based on: Peter Pan by J. M. Barrie
- Produced by: Jenni Magee-Cook
- Starring: Mae Whitman; Christina Hendricks; Tom Hiddleston; Lucy Liu; Raven-Symoné; Megan Hilty; Pamela Adlon; Angela Bartys; Anjelica Huston
- Edited by: Anna Catalano
- Music by: Joel McNeely
- Production companies: Disneytoon Studios; Prana Studios
- Distributed by: Walt Disney Studios; Home Entertainment (DVD); Walt Disney Studios; Motion Pictures (Theatrical)
- Release dates: February 13, 2014 (Denmark); April 1, 2014 (United States)
- Running time: 78 minutes
- Country: United States
- Language: English
- Box office: $73.8 million

The Pirate Fairy (originally titled as Tinker Bell and the Quest for the Queen or alternatively Tinker Bell and the Pirate Fairy) is a 2014 American animated fantasy film directed by Peggy Holmes. It is the fifth direct-to-video feature-length animated film in the Disneytoon Studios' Tinker Bell film series and the Disney Fairies franchise, based on the character Tinker Bell from J. M. Barrie's Peter Pan. The film features the voices of Mae Whitman, reprising the role of Tinker Bell, Christina Hendricks as a dust-keeper fairy named Zarina, and Tom Hiddleston as James (a young Captain Hook). The film also features the returning voices of Lucy Liu, Megan Hilty, Raven-Symoné, Pamela Adlon, Angela Bartys, Jeff Bennett and Anjelica Huston.

The film was released on Blu-ray and DVD by Walt Disney Studios Home Entertainment on April 1, 2014. It was followed by Tinker Bell and the Legend of the NeverBeast.

== Plot ==
In Pixie Hollow, an inquisitive dust-keeper fairy named Zarina is amazed by the magic behind pixie dust and is determined to learn more. She secretly experiments with blue pixie dust, creating variants; however, experiments with the pink variant grow wildly out of control, causing an accident in Pixie Hollow. Her supervisor, Fairy Gary, who had forbidden her from working with pixie dust, angrily fires her from her job. In sorrow, Zarina takes her experiments and leaves Pixie Hollow.

One year later, Pixie Hollow celebrates the Four Seasons Festival with performances from fairies of all the seasons. During the show, Tinker Bell, Silvermist, Iridessa, Rosetta, Fawn, and Vidia spot Zarina flying around the audience and using pink pixie dust to summon poppies that cause everyone to fall asleep, except for Clank. Tinker Bell and her friends, who take cover, realize Zarina stole all of the blue pixie dust, which is used to create the golden dust that fairies use to fly.

They follow Zarina to the coast, and discover she became the captain of a pirate crew. The fairies retrieve the blue dust for a moment, but Zarina retrieves it after throwing multi-colored pixie dust at them that switches their talents. Tinker Bell (who is a tinker fairy) becomes a water fairy, Silvermist (who is a water fairy) a fast-flying fairy, Fawn (who is an animal fairy) a light fairy, Iridessa (who is a light fairy) a garden fairy, Rosetta (who is a garden fairy) an animal fairy, and Vidia (who is a fast-flying fairy) a tinker fairy. They struggle with their swapped talents as they search for Zarina and the pirates, in the process meeting a baby crocodile that takes a liking to Rosetta.

They find the ship and sneak in, where they overhear James, the cabin boy, talking about how the pirates met Zarina after drifting off course, and she became the captain with the promise of making the ship fly so that they could plunder all over the mainland world. The ship arrives at Skull Rock, where the fairies discover the pirates' camp and a mysterious Pixie Dust Tree, which Zarina has grown using pink pixie dust.

The fairies attempt to retrieve the blue pixie dust but are caught when Iridessa loses control over her nature talent and reveals their location. Tinker Bell tries to convince Zarina to return home to Pixie Hollow, but she refuses because she feels more appreciated by the pirates. With the fairies now captured, Zarina and the pirates make golden flying pixie dust. James, curious about flying, convinces Zarina to use some on him. After joyfully flying around the cave, James betrays Zarina and traps her in a lantern, revealing himself as the real captain, and that he and the other pirates had been using her the whole time.

Tinker Bell and the others fail to escape their imprisonment until the baby crocodile arrives and frees them. The fairies almost retrieve the blue pixie dust, but James threatens to throw Zarina into the sea unless they hand it over. Tinker Bell gives it up, and James sprinkles it over the ship before throwing Zarina overboard. The other fairies rescue Zarina and they fly after the ship.

As the pirates sail towards the Second Star, the fairies return and use their talents to defeat the pirates and turn the ship. Zarina attempts to retrieve the blue pixie dust from James, who chases after her. Zarina gains a speck of blue pixie dust which she throws at James, who starts flying crazily as the two kinds of pixie dust react to each other. As the fairies fly away, James swears revenge on them and is attacked by the baby crocodile. Zarina returns the blue pixie dust to Tinker Bell and her friends, before preparing to leave. Tinker Bell offers her a chance to return to Pixie Hollow and she accepts, helping her friends sail the ship back. Once they return, the sleeping fairies in Pixie Hollow wake up.

Zarina is about to promise not to tamper with pixie dust again, but Tinker Bell convinces her to show off her abilities, restoring Tinker Bell and her friends' original fairy talents and allowing them to put on a beautiful Festival performance. Everyone congratulates them, and Zarina's alchemy talent is finally accepted.

During the mid-credit scenes, James finally evades the crocodile but is stranded in the ocean until he is rescued by Mr. Smee, who compliments the hook in his possession.

== Cast ==
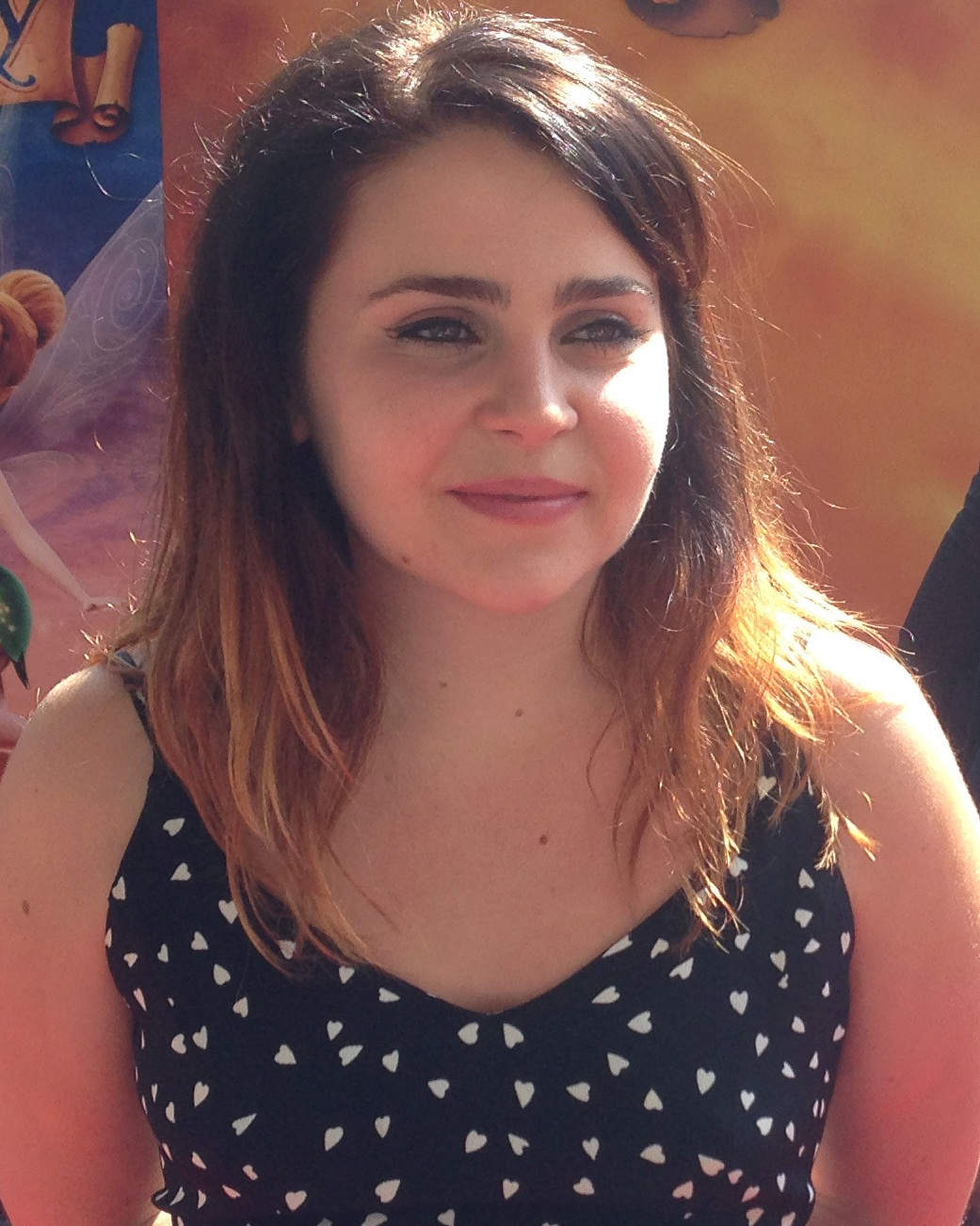
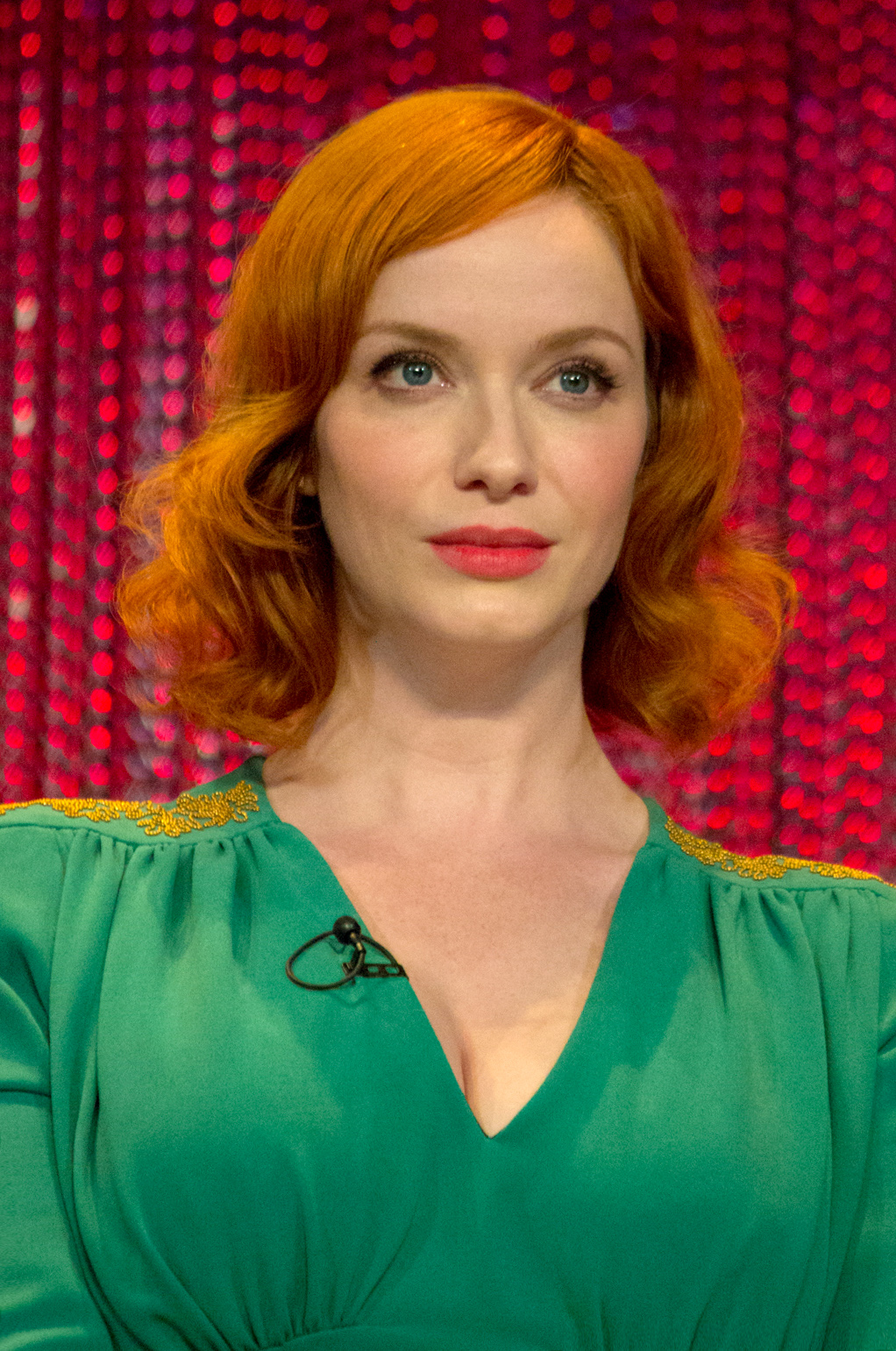
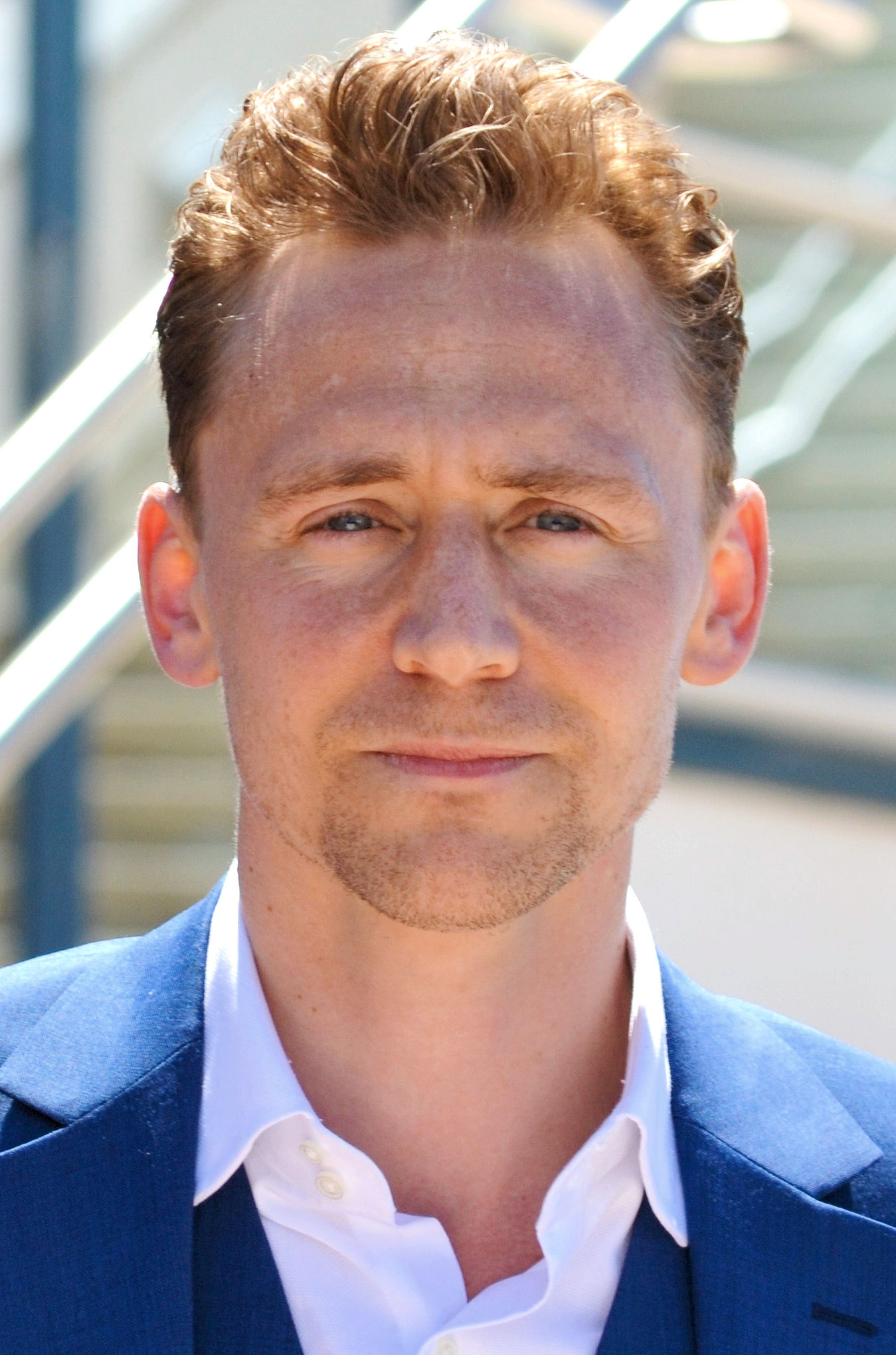
From left to right: Mae Whitman, Christina Hendricks, and Tom Hiddleston
- Mae Whitman as Tinker Bell, a tinker fairy.
- Christina Hendricks as Zarina, an unusually skilled and inquisitive dust-keeper fairy.
- Tom Hiddleston as James, the captain of the pirate ship disguised as the cabin boy.
- Lucy Liu as Silvermist, a water fairy.
- Raven-Symoné as Iridessa, a light fairy.
- Megan Hilty as Rosetta, a garden fairy.
- Pamela Adlon as Vidia, a fast-flying fairy.
- Angela Bartys as Fawn, an animal fairy.
- Jim Cummings as Port and Oppenheimer, two of James' crew members.
- Carlos Ponce as Bonito, one of James' crew members.
- Mick Wingert as Starboard, one of James' crew members.
- Kevin Michael Richardson as Yang, James' tough Chinese second-in-command.
- Jeff Bennett voices three characters in the film:
  - Clank, a large tinker fairy with a booming voice.
  - Fairy Gary, a large dust-keeper fairy.
  - Mr. Smee, a crew member from The Jolly Roger who meets James.
- Rob Paulsen as Bobble, a wispy tinker fairy with large glasses and Clank's best friend.
- Grey DeLisle-Griffin as MC Fairy / Gliss.
- Kari Wahlgren as Sweetpea / Sydney.
- Jane Horrocks as Fairy Mary, the overseer of all tinker fairies.
- Anjelica Huston as Queen Clarion, the queen of Pixie Hollow.

== Production ==
The film was originally titled Quest for the Queen. Peggy Holmes, co-director of Secret of the Wings signed on to direct the film. It introduced new characters, Zarina, voiced by Christina Hendricks, and James aka young Captain Hook, voiced by Tom Hiddleston. Carlos Ponce also lent his voice to one of the characters in the film.

Disney announced in January 2014 that former Project Runway winner and fashion designer Christian Siriano would be in charge of creating the ensemble costumes for the fairies, specifically Zarina. Siriano stated that "I loved the challenge of this project. I haven't designed for an animated character before, and I'm excited to take my skills into Zarina's world. She's a unique and new character and I wanted to help make her memorable and iconic. Disney characters are everlasting and I'm so happy as a young designer to help create a bit of Disney history."

== Release ==
The film was released internationally in theaters with the title Tinker Bell and the Pirate Fairy on February 13, 2014, and later dates, with 2D and 3D screenings available. In the United States the screenings took place exclusively at the El Capitan Theatre in Hollywood, from February 28 to March 19, 2014. It was originally scheduled for Fall 2013, before another Disneytoon Studios film, Planes, took its place, delaying the film to Spring 2014.

=== Marketing ===
A trailer for the film was released on the Secret of the Wings Blu-ray and DVD on October 23, 2012. The Pirate Fairy is the first film of the Tinker Bell series not to allude to the Disney Fairies brand in promotional material and not to display the brand logo at the beginning of the film, showing instead the Disneytoon Studios logo.

=== Home media ===
The film was released by Walt Disney Studios Home Entertainment on DVD and Blu-ray in the United States on April 1, 2014, and in the United Kingdom on June 23, 2014. Bonus features of the DVD include a documentary and two animated shorts. The Blu-ray contains the bonus features of the DVD and additions such as deleted scenes, sing-along songs and a making-of clip of "The Frigate That Flies" song with actor Tom Hiddleston.

During the pre-order period of the combo pack with the DVD, Blu-ray and Digital Copy versions of the film, a limited edition set of four lithographs featuring shots from the film would be included with the order. Several stores also released exclusive sets which bundled the combo pack with a certain item of the Disney Fairies merchandise, such as a bonus DVD with the animated short Pixie Hollow Bake Off and 10 other mini-shorts, the storybook and read-along CD of The Pirate Fairy film, a set of six wall decal sheets, and a glitter brush.

== Reception ==
Review aggregator Rotten Tomatoes reports an approval rating of 81% based on 21 reviews, with an average score of 6.39/10. The critical consensus reads, "A frilly fun time full of adventure for kids and parents alike, The Pirate Fairy will make you keep believing."

== Soundtrack ==
The film was scored by Joel McNeely, who has also scored the previous films in the Tinker Bell series.

=== Songs ===
The soundtrack features an original song titled "Who I Am," performed by Natasha Bedingfield, as well as Bedingfield's previously released song, "Weightless," which was initially used on the film's scratch recording but was so well received, director Peggy Holmes decided to make it permanent.

Another original song, "The Frigate That Flies," with music by Gaby Alter and lyrics by Gaby Alter and Itamar Moses, is performed in the film by the pirate crew as a musical number.
