= Secret of the Wings =

- DVD cover
- Directed by: Peggy Holmes
- Screenplay by: Bobs Gannaway; Peggy Holmes; Ryan Rowe; Tom Rogers
- Based on: Tinker Bell from Peter Pan by J. M. Barrie
- Produced by: Makul Wigert
- Starring: Mae Whitman; Lucy Hale; Timothy Dalton; Jeff Bennett; Lucy Liu; Raven-Symoné; Megan Hilty; Pamela Adlon; Angela Bartys; Anjelica Huston
- Narrated by: Anjelica Huston
- Edited by: Mark Rosenbaum
- Music by: Joel McNeely
- Production company: Disneytoon Studios
- Distributed by: Walt Disney Studios; Home Entertainment (DVD); Walt Disney Studios; Motion Pictures (Theatrical)
- Release dates: August 16, 2012 (Ukraine); August 31, 2012 (United States (limited)); October 23, 2012 (DVD release)
- Running time: 75 minutes
- Country: United States
- Language: English
- Budget: $30—35 million
- Box office: $67.1 million

Secret of the Wings (originally titled Tinker Bell and the Mysterious Winter Woods or alternatively Tinker Bell and the Secret of the Wings) is a 2012 American animated fantasy film, and the fourth installment in the Disney Fairies franchise, produced by Disneytoon Studios. It revolves around Tinker Bell, a fairy character created by J. M. Barrie in his 1904 play, Peter Pan, or The Boy Who Wouldn't Grow Up, and featured in subsequent adaptations, especially in Disney's animated works, and how she ventures to the Winter Woods and meets her twin sister, Periwinkle, who is a frost fairy. The film was directed by Peggy Holmes and co-directed by Bobs Gannaway. Starring the voices of Mae Whitman, Lucy Liu, Megan Hilty, Raven-Symoné, Pamela Adlon and Angela Bartys, it also features new cast members, including Lucy Hale, Matt Lanter, Timothy Dalton and Debby Ryan, while Anjelica Huston narrates.

The film was released on Blu-ray and DVD by Walt Disney Studios Home Entertainment on October 23, 2012. It was followed by two more sequels: The Pirate Fairy and Tinker Bell and the Legend of the NeverBeast.

== Plot ==
As winter approaches, Tinker Bell helps her friend Fawn take the animals to the Winter Woods to get them ready for hibernation. However, fairies from the warmer seasons are forbidden from crossing the border to the Woods as the cold can damage their wings, a law supposedly instated by Lord Milori. Out of curiosity, Tinker Bell crosses over, and her wings start to sparkle. Before she can investigate further, Fawn pulls her back. Tinker Bell researches sparkling wings but finds the page incomplete. The book's author, the Keeper, lives in the Woods.

Tucking her wings in a coat, Tinker Bell hides in a shipment of snowflake baskets. She gets picked up by a novice Owl who crash lands in the Woods, and the book falls out of her bag. The book is found by Lord Milori, who has it delivered to the Keeper. Tinker Bell secretly follows to the library and spots the Keeper, Dewey. Periwinkle, another winter fairy rushes into the room; her wings sparkle like Tinker Bell’s. The two fairies have actually been born from the same laugh, making them sisters.

Periwinkle shows Tinker Bell around the Woods. At Periwinkle’s home, Tinker Bell builds a fire which eventually causes the floor to melt and crumble beneath them. Dewey saves Tinker Bell, who cannot fly, having her wings tucked inside her coat. He advises that it is too dangerous for them to be together. The sisters say goodbye at the border but promise to meet again.

The next day, Tinker Bell arrives at the border with an ice-powered snowmaker. With the machine keeping her cool, Periwinkle crosses over and Tinker Bell introduces her to her friends, showing her the warm side of Pixie Hollow. The machine eventually starts running out of ice and Periwinkle’s wings begin to wilt. Tinker Bell and her friends rush her to the border and meet Lord Milori, who takes Periwinkle back to the Woods. Queen Clarion later explains that she was the one who instated the law. Tinker Bell and Periwinkle say goodbye to each other forever. Lord Milori knocks the snow-maker into the stream under the bridge, where it gets caught by rocks.

Tinker Bell and Periwinkle are told, by Queen Clarion and Lord Milori respectively, the story of two fairies who fell in love, one from the warm seasons, the other from the Woods. As their romance grew, one of them crossed the border, resulting in them breaking a wing; a damage for which there was no known cure. Clarion declared the separation of the warm fairies from the winter fairies to prevent any similar incidents from happening again.

Receiving news of an emergency, Tinker Bell and Clarion return to the border and find that the snow-maker has been collecting ice from the stream, generating snow and causing a blizzard. Tinker Bell and her friends free the snow-maker, but a freeze that will engulf Pixie Hollow begins to spread, and will eventually reach the Pixie Dust tree. Tinker Bell notices that a Periwinkle flower that Periwinkle had covered in frost is still alive and flies to the Woods. As she approaches the winter fairies, Tinker Bell's wings freeze and she crashes. Periwinkle’s friends explain that frost keeps the warm air inside like a blanket and they return to the pixie dust tree to cover it in frost. They are joined by Milori, who brings reinforcements, and all the winter fairies work to frost as much of the warm seasons as possible. As the freeze approaches, Lord Milori warns the warm fairies to take cover, including Clarion whom he gives his cape, revealing one of his wings is broken.

The freeze subsides, the Tree is safe, and the fairies celebrate. However, Tinker Bell reveals that she broke a wing while flying to the Woods earlier. As the sisters say goodbye, Tinker Bell and Periwinkle’s wings touch and the broken wing heals. Clarion and Milori kiss, revealing themselves as the lovers from the story. The warm fairies can cross over the border by having their wings frosted and the two sisters never have to be apart again.

== Voice cast ==
- Mae Whitman as Tinker Bell, a tinker fairy and Periwinkle's twin sister.
- Lucy Hale as Periwinkle, a frost fairy and Tinker Bell's twin sister.
- Timothy Dalton as Lord Milori, leader of the Winter fairies.
- Jeff Bennett as:
  - Dewey, a frost fairy and keeper of the Winter Woods.
  - Clank, a large tinker fairy.
- Lucy Liu as Silvermist, a water fairy.
- Raven-Symoné as Iridessa, a light fairy.
- Megan Hilty as Rosetta, a garden fairy.
- Pamela Adlon as Vidia, a fast-flying fairy.
- Angela Bartys as Fawn, an animal fairy.
- Debby Ryan as Spike, a frost fairy and Periwinkle's best friend.
- Grey DeLisle as Gliss, a frost fairy and Periwinkle's secondary best friend.
- Rob Paulsen as Bobble, a wispy tinker fairy with large glasses and Clank's best friend.
- Jane Horrocks as Fairy Mary, the overseer of all tinker fairies.
- Jodi Benson as Healing Fairy.
- Kari Wahlgren as Receptionist.
- Thomas Lennon as Reading Fairy.
- Benjamin Diskin as Slush, a Glacier Fairy.
- Kathy Najimy as The Minister of Summer.
- John DiMaggio as The Minister of Autumn.
- Steve Valentine as The Minister of Spring.
- Dee Bradley Baker as:
  - Cheese
  - Fiona
- Anjelica Huston as Queen Clarion, the queen of all Pixie Hollow.
- Matt Lanter as Sled, a frost fairy and Periwinkle's friend.

== Release ==
The film was given a limited theatrical release in the United States between August 31, 2012, and September 13, 2012. It was released on DVD and Blu-ray on October 23, 2012. It was the first film in the Disney Fairies franchise that was released in 3D. The Blu-ray, Blu-ray 3D, DVD releases also include the short film Pixie Hollow Games as a "Bonus Adventure".

The film was released theatrically in many countries and grossed $67,084,376 worldwide.

== Reception ==
Peter Bradshaw of The Guardian rated it 2/5 stars and called it "machine-tooled for the tweenie sleepover market". Mark Adams of Screen Daily suggested that young children may enjoy it though they are unlikely to be impressed.

Review aggregation website Rotten Tomatoes surveyed 21 reviews of the film and found 62% of them to be positive, with an average rating of 5.4/10.

== Soundtrack ==
"The Great Divide" is sung by the McClain Sisters.
