= Tinker Bell and the Legend of the NeverBeast =

- Theatrical release poster
- Directed by: Steve Loter
- Screenplay by: Kate Kondell; Mark McCorkle; Tom Rogers; Robert Schooley
- Story by: Steve Loter; Tom Rogers
- Based on: Peter Pan by J. M. Barrie
- Produced by: Makul Wigert
- Starring: Ginnifer Goodwin; Mae Whitman; Rosario Dawson; Lucy Liu; Raven-Symoné; Megan Hilty; Pamela Adlon
- Narrated by: Grey DeLisle-Griffin
- Cinematography: Navneet Verma
- Edited by: Margaret Hou
- Music by: Joel McNeely
- Production company: Disneytoon Studios
- Distributed by: Walt Disney Studios; Home Entertainment (Note: Released through the Walt Disney Pictures banner.) (Note: Labelled as Walt Disney Studios Motion Pictures on the end credits.)
- Release dates: December 12, 2014 (United Kingdom); January 30, 2015 (United States)
- Running time: 76 minutes
- Country: United States
- Language: English
- Box office: $31.2 million (non-US box office)

Tinker Bell and the Legend of the NeverBeast is a 2014 American animated fantasy film directed by Steve Loter. It is the sixth installment in the Tinker Bell film series, based on the character Tinker Bell from J. M. Barrie's Peter Pan. This was the final feature film to be produced by Disneytoon Studios three years before its closure on June 28, 2018. It is also the last of the direct to video Disney follow-ups after a 21-year-long run.

Mae Whitman, Lucy Liu, Raven-Symoné, Megan Hilty, Pamela Adlon, and Anjelica Huston reprise their roles of Tinker Bell, Silvermist, Iridessa, Rosetta, Vidia and Queen Clarion. Ginnifer Goodwin joins the cast, replacing Angela Bartys as the voice of Fawn in this film, Rosario Dawson joins the cast as new character Nyx. Singer Mel B also joins the cast as new character Fury in the British release while Danai Gurira voices her in the American release.

== Plot ==
Fawn, a talented animal fairy, frequently gets into trouble for harbouring dangerous creatures in Pixie Hollow, such as bats, snakes, and most recently, a baby hawk. She is advised by Queen Clarion to listen to her head, as well as her heart. While teaching bunnies how to hop, Fawn discovers a mysterious creature lying in a cave, which is apparently suffering from a thorn in one of his paws. Fawn tries to help the beast and discovers that it is not vicious. Over time, she forms a bond with the creature, whom she names Gruff, and notices he is building rock towers.

Meanwhile, an ambitious scout fairy named Nyx investigates the situation, researching in the library to find out what she is up against. Using some information gathered from several torn pages of an undisclosed animal book, she discovers that Gruff is actually the NeverBeast, a legendary creature that awakens once every millennium, when he will build and use rock towers to transform into a terrifying beast that could destroy Pixie Hollow. Fawn reassures her friends that Gruff is harmless, but they remain skeptical. Tinker Bell tells her that even if he is not a threat, Pixie Hollow is not safe for Gruff.

One day, Gruff disappears and ominous green clouds start forming in the sky. Nyx and the scouts head out to capture Gruff. Realising he is building towers in each season of Pixie Hollow, Fawn searches Summer while Tinker Bell heads to Winter. Tinker Bell encounters Gruff, who is beginning to transform into the beast from Nyx's legend. She tries to encourage him to hide, but Gruff slaps her aside with his newly grown tail, knocking her unconscious. Fawn arrives and is shocked to find Tinker Bell, while she watches in horror as Gruff sprouts a pair of horns. He disappears and Fawn rushes Tinker Bell home.

Heartbroken that Gruff is really a monster, Fawn agrees to lure him into Nyx's trap and Gruff is captured. Tinker Bell wakes up and explains that Gruff actually saved her from getting crushed by a falling tree. Fawn realises she misunderstood the situation and flies off to rescue Gruff. She and her friends manage to free him, but his vision is hindered by the knockout Nightshade used during his capture. Gruff's horns absorb a bolt of lightning and then sprouts a pair of wings. Fawn finally realises what Gruff is there to do; he absorbs the lightning from the storms using the towers in order to stop it from destroying Pixie Hollow. She tells him to follow the glow of her wings and the pair head off to the towers.

The plan goes well until Nyx destroys the final tower, still believing Gruff to be a danger. With no time to rebuild it, Fawn leads Gruff into the eye of the storm, where he absorbs every single lightning strike. Gruff pulls Fawn out of the way just in time, and the two of them fall to the ground, ending the storm. Gruff's horns and wings are destroyed, but he is saved by Nyx's scouts. Fawn is also caught, but has seemingly been killed by the power of the storm. As Gruff mourns her, the lightning he absorbed makes a spark which revives Fawn, much to everyone's delight.

For the next few days, Fawn passes on a new legend to future generations of fairies, one where the NeverBeast is not a monster, but the Hero of Pixie Hollow. Gruff helps rebuild Pixie Hollow until Fawn realises it is time for him to hibernate for another thousand years, meaning the fairies will never see him again. Fawn and the other fairies sadly guide Gruff back to his cave in a sendoff ceremony and try to make his slumber as comfortable as possible.

== Voice cast ==
- Ginnifer Goodwin as Fawn, an animal fairy and the main protagonist of the film
- Mae Whitman as Tinker Bell, a tinker fairy
- Rosario Dawson as Nyx, a scout fairy
- Lucy Liu as Silvermist, a water fairy
- Raven-Symoné as Iridessa, a light fairy
- Megan Hilty as Rosetta, a garden fairy
- Pamela Adlon as Vidia, a fast-flying fairy
- Danai Gurira (US release) as Fury
  - Mel B (UK release) as Fury
- Chloe Bennet as Chase
- Thomas Lennon as Scribble
- Jeff Corwin as Buck
- Olivia Holt as Morgan
- Grey DeLisle-Griffin as Narrator
- Kari Wahlgren as Robin
- Anjelica Huston as Queen Clarion

== Release ==
The film was released theatrically in selected markets including the United Kingdom on December 12, 2014. In the United States, it had a limited theatrical release, opening on January 30, 2015, at the El Capitan Theatre for a 13-day engagement, and was released direct-to-video on March 3, 2015.

== Reception ==
=== Box office ===
Overseas, the film grossed $31,178,525.

=== Critical reception ===
On the review aggregator website Rotten Tomatoes, 75% of 20 critics' reviews are positive. The website's consensus reads: "Tinkerbell and the Legend of the Never Beast sprinkles enough fairy dust to lift this predicable yet excellently crafted tale to fantastical new heights" Metacritic, which uses a weighted average, assigned the film a score of 52 out of 100, based on 5 critics, indicating "mixed or average" reviews.

== Cancelled sequels ==
In addition to Tinker Bell and the Legend of the NeverBeast, Disney also had plans for a seventh film. In 2014, The Hollywood Reporter stated that the seventh film was cancelled due to story problems. The title of the film and the release date was unknown. Additionally, the production studio of the film series, Disneytoon Studios, was shut down on June 28, 2018.
