= List of Disney feature-length home entertainment releases =

This is a list of feature-length films released by Walt Disney Studios Home Entertainment for home entertainment. Some of the films were produced directly to home theater by Disney without a theatrical run, while some of them received a theatrical run in Europe. Others were originally produced by another company and released for a theatrical run, but later distributed on home video by Disney. These films are not part of the Disney Animated Canon.

== Produced and distributed by Disney ==
=== Animated films ===
The following is a list of films that were released straight to home video and thus did not have a theatrical release. They were either produced by Walt Disney Pictures, Disney Television Animation, and/or Disneytoon Studios, and the majority are sequels or spin-offs of Walt Disney Animation Studios films (not being part of the Disney Animated Canon).

Film	Date of original release	Notes	Studio(s)
The Return of Jafar	May 20, 1994		Disney MovieToons; Walt Disney Television Animation
Gargoyles the Movie: The Heroes Awaken	January 31, 1995	(Note: Edited from two or more TV episodes, with new wrap-around animation running ca. 5-25% of the film's total runtime)	Walt Disney Television Animation
Aladdin and the King of Thieves	August 13, 1996		Disney MovieToons; Walt Disney Television Animation
Around the World with Timon and Pumbaa	September 12, 1996	(Note: Released on home video and DVD only in Europe)	Walt Disney Television Animation
Mighty Ducks the Movie: The First Face-Off	April 8, 1997		Walt Disney Television Animation
Pooh's Grand Adventure: The Search for Christopher Robin	August 5, 1997		Disney MovieToons; Walt Disney Television Animation
Jungle Cubs: Born to Be Wild	August 15, 1997		Walt Disney Television Animation
Beauty and the Beast: The Enchanted Christmas	November 11, 1997		Disney MovieToons; Walt Disney Television Animation
Belle's Magical World	February 17, 1998		Disney MovieToons; Walt Disney Television Animation
Pocahontas II: Journey to a New World	August 25, 1998		Disney MovieToons; Walt Disney Television Animation
The Lion King II: Simba's Pride	October 27, 1998		Disney MovieToons; Walt Disney Television Animation
Hercules: Zero to Hero	August 17, 1999		Walt Disney Television Animation
Belle's Tales of Friendship	August 17, 1999		Walt Disney Television Animation
Winnie the Pooh: Seasons of Giving	November 9, 1999		Disney MovieToons; Walt Disney Television Animation
Mickey's Once Upon a Christmas	November 9, 1999		Disney MovieToons; Walt Disney Television Animation
An Extremely Goofy Movie	February 29, 2000		Disney MovieToons; Walt Disney Television Animation
Buzz Lightyear of Star Command: The Adventure Begins	August 8, 2000	(Note: These films were original TV pilots or failed TV pilots to the TV series of the same name.)	Walt Disney Pictures; Pixar Animation Studios; Walt Disney Television Animation
The Little Mermaid II: Return to the Sea	September 19, 2000		Walt Disney Pictures; Disney Video Premiere; Walt Disney Television Animation
Lady and the Tramp II: Scamp's Adventure	February 27, 2001		Walt Disney Pictures; Walt Disney Television Animation
Mickey's Magical Christmas: Snowed in at the House of Mouse	November 6, 2001		Walt Disney Television Animation
Recess Christmas: Miracle on Third Street	November 6, 2001		Walt Disney Television Animation; Paul and Joe Productions
Cinderella II: Dreams Come True	February 26, 2002		Walt Disney Pictures; Walt Disney Television Animation
The Hunchback of Notre Dame II	March 19, 2002		Walt Disney Pictures; Walt Disney Television Animation
Tarzan & Jane	July 23, 2002		Walt Disney Television Animation
Mickey's House of Villains	September 3, 2002		Walt Disney Television Animation
Winnie the Pooh: A Very Merry Pooh Year	November 12, 2002		Walt Disney Pictures; Walt Disney Television Animation
101 Dalmatians II: Patch's London Adventure	January 21, 2003		Walt Disney Pictures; Walt Disney Television Animation
Atlantis: Milo's Return	May 20, 2003		Walt Disney Television Animation
Stitch! The Movie	August 26, 2003		Walt Disney Pictures; Walt Disney Television Animation
Recess: All Growed Down	December 9, 2003		Walt Disney Television Animation; Paul and Joe Productions
Recess: Taking the Fifth Grade	December 9, 2003		Walt Disney Television Animation; Paul and Joe Productions
The Lion King 1½	February 10, 2004		Walt Disney Pictures; Disneytoon Studios
Winnie the Pooh: Springtime with Roo	March 9, 2004		Walt Disney Pictures; Disneytoon Studios
Mickey, Donald, Goofy: The Three Musketeers	August 17, 2004		Walt Disney Pictures; Disneytoon Studios
Mickey's Twice Upon a Christmas	November 9, 2004	(Note: These films are "package films", releases made up of two or more short films with bridging sequences.) (Note: These films are computer-animated films.)	Walt Disney Pictures; Disneytoon Studios
Mulan II	December 28, 2004		Walt Disney Pictures; Disneytoon Studios
Tarzan II	June 14, 2005		Walt Disney Pictures; Disneytoon Studios
Lilo & Stitch 2: Stitch Has a Glitch	August 30, 2005		Walt Disney Pictures; Disneytoon Studios
Pooh's Heffalump Halloween Movie	September 13, 2005		Walt Disney Pictures; Disneytoon Studios
Once Upon a Halloween	September 28, 2005	(Note: Anthology film composed mainly of scenes from other films, as well as original animation.)	Walt Disney Home Entertainment
Kronk's New Groove	December 13, 2005		Walt Disney Pictures; Disneytoon Studios
Bambi II	February 7, 2006	(Note: Theatrically released outside the United States)	Walt Disney Pictures; Disneytoon Studios
Leroy & Stitch	June 27, 2006	(Note: Released on the same day as a TV movie.)	Walt Disney Pictures; Walt Disney Television Animation
Brother Bear 2	August 29, 2006		Walt Disney Pictures; Disneytoon Studios
The Fox and the Hound 2	December 12, 2006		Walt Disney Pictures; Disneytoon Studios
Cinderella III: A Twist in Time	February 6, 2007		Walt Disney Pictures; Disneytoon Studios
Disney Princess Enchanted Tales: Follow Your Dreams	September 4, 2007		Disneytoon Studios
Super Sleuth Christmas Movie	November 20, 2007		Walt Disney Television Animation; Polygon Pictures
The Little Mermaid: Ariel's Beginning	August 26, 2008		Walt Disney Pictures; Disneytoon Studios
Tinker Bell	October 28, 2008		Walt Disney Pictures; Disneytoon Studios
Tigger & Pooh and a Musical Too	April 7, 2009		Walt Disney Television Animation
Tinker Bell and the Lost Treasure	October 27, 2009		Walt Disney Pictures; Disneytoon Studios
Tinker Bell and the Great Fairy Rescue	September 21, 2010		Walt Disney Pictures; Disneytoon Studios
Secret of the Wings	October 23, 2012		Walt Disney Pictures; Disneytoon Studios
The Pirate Fairy	April 1, 2014		Walt Disney Pictures; Disneytoon Studios
Tinker Bell and the Legend of the NeverBeast	March 3, 2015		Walt Disney Pictures; Disneytoon Studios

=== Live-action films ===
Film	Date of original release	Studio(s)
Honey, We Shrunk Ourselves	March 18, 1997	Walt Disney Pictures
The Jungle Book: Mowgli's Story	September 29, 1998	Walt Disney Pictures
Inspector Gadget 2	March 11, 2003	Walt Disney Pictures; The Kerner Entertainment Company
George of the Jungle 2	October 21, 2003	Walt Disney Pictures; The Kerner Entertainment Company
Air Buddies	December 12, 2006	Key Pix Productions
Snow Buddies	February 5, 2008	Walt Disney Pictures; Key Pix Productions
Space Buddies	February 3, 2009	Walt Disney Pictures; Key Pix Productions
Santa Buddies	November 24, 2009	Walt Disney Pictures; Key Pix Productions
The Search for Santa Paws	November 23, 2010	Walt Disney Pictures; Key Pix Productions
Beverly Hills Chihuahua 2	February 1, 2011	Walt Disney Pictures
Sharpay's Fabulous Adventure	April 19, 2011	Borden & Rosenbush Entertainment; Princessa Productions, LTD
Spooky Buddies	September 20, 2011	Walt Disney Pictures; Key Pix Productions
Treasure Buddies	January 31, 2012	Walt Disney Pictures; Key Pix Productions
Beverly Hills Chihuahua 3: Viva la Fiesta!	September 18, 2012	Walt Disney Pictures
Santa Paws 2: The Santa Pups	November 20, 2012	Walt Disney Pictures; Key Pix Productions
Super Buddies	August 27, 2013	Walt Disney Pictures; Key Pix Productions

=== Other ===
- The Walt Disney Comedy and Magic Revue (1985)
- Walt Disney Video A-Longs (1986)
- Disney's Greatest Lullabies (1986)
- Disney Sing-Along Songs (1986–2006)

== Distribution only ==
=== Walt Disney Home Video/Home Entertainment ===
- Long Live the Queen (1995, Benelux distribution only, produced by First Floor Features) (Note: Originally a non-Disney theatrical release to which Disney acquired the home media distribution rights to.)
- The Brave Little Toaster Goes to Mars (1998, produced by Hyperion Pictures)
- The Brave Little Toaster to the Rescue (1999, produced by Hyperion Pictures)
- Madeline: Lost in Paris (1999, produced by DIC Entertainment)
- Air Bud: World Pup (2000, produced by Keystone Pictures)
- The Book of Pooh: Stories from the Heart (2001) (Produced by Shadow Projects) (Note: Edited from two or more TV episodes, with new wrap-around animation/content running ca. 5-25% of the film's total runtime)
- The Other Side of Heaven (2001, North American distribution only)
- Air Bud: Seventh Inning Fetch (2002, produced by Keystone Pictures)
- Where the Red Fern Grows (2003)
- Air Bud: Spikes Back (2003, produced by Keystone Pictures)
- The Girl Can Rock (2004)
- Little Einsteins: Our Huge Adventure (2005, produced by Curious Pictures and The Baby Einstein Company) (Note: These films were original TV pilots or failed TV pilots to the TV series of the same name.)
- Stanley's Dinosaur Round-Up (2006, co-production with Cartoon Pizza) (Note: These films were original TV movies.)
- The 3 Wise Men (2005, North American distribution only)
- Air Buddies (2006, produced by Keystone Pictures)
- High School Musical: The Concert (2007)
- Taare Zameen Par (Like Stars on Earth) (2010, produced by Aamir Khan Productions and PVR Pictures)

=== Buena Vista Home Video/Home Entertainment ===
- Street Sharks: The Gene Slamming Begins (1994, co-produced with DIC Productions, L.P. and Bohbot Entertainment)
- The Duke (1999, produced by Keystone Pictures)

=== DIC Toon-Time Video ===
- Double Dragon: The Shield of the Shadow Khan (1994)
- Mummies Alive! The Legend Begins (1998)
- Inspector Gadget: Gadget's Greatest Gadgets (2000)

=== Miramax Home Entertainment ===
- How the Toys Saved Christmas (1997)
- Bionicle: Mask of Light (2003, co-production with The Lego Group, Create TV & Film and Creative Capers Entertainment) (Note: The English DVD release in South Africa and a Hungarian VHS release were branded under the Disney umberella)
- Bionicle 2: Legends of Metru Nui (2004, co-production with The Lego Group, Create TV & Film and Creative Capers Entertainment) (Note: Releases in Poland and the Czech Republic were branded under the Disney umberella)
- Bionicle 3: Web of Shadows (2005, co-production with The Lego Group, Create TV & Film and Creative Capers Entertainment)

=== Touchstone Home Video/Home Entertainment ===
- Slam Dunk Ernest (1995)
- The Wonderful Ice Cream Suit (1998)
- The Patriot (1998)
- Woman Wanted (1999, American distribution only)
- Entropy (1999)

=== Hollywood Pictures Home Video/Home Entertainment ===
- The Wrong Guy (1997, American distribution only)

== See also ==
- List of Disneytoon Studios productions
- List of Disney theatrical animated feature films
- List of Walt Disney Pictures films
- List of Disney+ original films
- List of remakes and adaptations of Disney animated films
