= List of Disneytoon Studios productions =

Final logo used from 2011 to 2018.

The following is a list of all productions produced or released by Disneytoon Studios (formerly Disney Video Premieres and Disney MovieToons), the animation division of Walt Disney Animation Studios (part of The Walt Disney Studios, itself a division of The Walt Disney Company), including animated and live-action feature films, shorts, television and internet series, & specials.

== Filmography ==
=== Feature films ===
As of 2002, the films that Disneytoon had made often had budgets less than $15 million for production, and had taken in $100 million in sales and rentals.

#	Title	Franchise	Release date	Release type	Animation Service(s)	Other Studio(s)
Disney MovieToons / Disney Video Premieres (Walt Disney Television Animation)
1	DuckTales the Movie: Treasure of the Lost Lamp	DuckTales	August 3, 1990	Theatrical	Disney Animation France	Walt Disney Pictures
2	The Return of Jafar	Aladdin	May 20, 1994	Direct-to-video	Disney Animation Australia; Disney Animation Japan	Walt Disney Television Animation
3	A Goofy Movie	Goof Troop	April 7, 1995	Theatrical	Disney Animation France; Disney Animation Australia; Phoenix Animation Studios	Walt Disney Pictures
4	Aladdin and the King of Thieves	Aladdin	August 13, 1996	Direct-to-video	Disney Animation Australia; Disney Animation Japan	Walt Disney Television Animation
5	Pooh's Grand Adventure: The Search for Christopher Robin	Winnie the Pooh	August 5, 1997	Direct-to-video	Disney Animation Japan	Walt Disney Television Animation
6	Beauty and the Beast: The Enchanted Christmas	Beauty and the Beast	November 11, 1997	Direct-to-video	Disney Animation Canada	Walt Disney Television Animation
7	Belle's Magical World	Beauty and the Beast	February 17, 1998	Direct-to-video	N/A	Walt Disney Television Animation
8	Pocahontas II: Journey to a New World	Pocahontas	August 25, 1998	Direct-to-video	Disney Animation Australia; Disney Animation Canada; Disney Animation Japan	Walt Disney Television Animation
9	The Lion King II: Simba's Pride	The Lion King	October 27, 1998	Direct-to-video	Disney Animation Australia	Walt Disney Television Animation
10	Mickey's Once Upon a Christmas	Mickey Mouse	November 9, 1999	Direct-to-video	Disney Animation Japan; Disney Animation Canada	Walt Disney Television Animation
11	Seasons of Giving	Winnie the Pooh	November 9, 1999	Direct-to-video	Disney Animation Australia	Walt Disney Television Animation
12	The Tigger Movie	Winnie the Pooh	February 11, 2000	Theatrical	Walt Disney Animation Japan	Walt Disney Pictures; Walt Disney Television Animation
13	An Extremely Goofy Movie	Goof Troop	February 29, 2000	Direct-to-video	Disney Animation Australia	Walt Disney Television Animation
14	The Little Mermaid II: Return to the Sea	The Little Mermaid	September 19, 2000	Direct-to-video	Disney Animation Canada	Walt Disney Pictures; Walt Disney Television Animation
15	Lady and the Tramp II: Scamp's Adventure	Lady and the Tramp	February 27, 2001	Direct-to-video	Walt Disney Animation Australia	Walt Disney Pictures; Walt Disney Television Animation
16	Return to Never Land	Peter Pan	February 15, 2002	Theatrical	Disney Animation Australia; Disney Animation Canada; Disney Animation Japan; Cornerstone Animation	Walt Disney Pictures; Walt Disney Television Animation
17	Cinderella II: Dreams Come True	Cinderella	February 26, 2002	Direct-to-video	Disney Animation Japan	Walt Disney Pictures; Walt Disney Television Animation
18	The Hunchback of Notre Dame II	The Hunchback of Notre Dame	March 19, 2002	Direct-to-video	Disney Animation Japan	Walt Disney Pictures; Walt Disney Television Animation
19	A Very Merry Pooh Year	Winnie the Pooh	November 12, 2002	Direct-to-video	N/A	Walt Disney Pictures; Walt Disney Television Animation
20	101 Dalmatians II: Patch's London Adventure	101 Dalmatians	January 21, 2003	Direct-to-video	Disney Animation Japan	Walt Disney Pictures; Walt Disney Television Animation
Disney MovieToons (under Walt Disney Feature Animation)
21	The Jungle Book 2	The Jungle Book	February 14, 2003	Theatrical	Disney Animation Australia; Disney Animation France; Tandem Films; ToonCity Animation; Spaff Animation	Walt Disney Pictures
22	Piglet's Big Movie	Winnie the Pooh	March 21, 2003	Theatrical	Disney Animation Japan	Walt Disney Pictures
23	Atlantis: Milo's Return	Atlantis: The Lost Empire	May 13, 2003	Direct-to-video	Walt Disney Television Animation	Walt Disney Pictures
Disneytoon Studios
24	The Lion King 1½	The Lion King	February 13, 2004	Direct-to-video	Disney Animation Australia; Cornerstone Animation	Walt Disney Pictures
25	Springtime with Roo	Winnie the Pooh	March 9, 2004	Direct-to-video	N/A	Walt Disney Pictures
26	Mickey, Donald, Goofy: The Three Musketeers	Mickey Mouse	August 17, 2004	Direct-to-video	Disney Animation Australia	Walt Disney Pictures
27	Mickey's Twice Upon a Christmas	Mickey Mouse	November 9, 2004	Direct-to-video	Blur Studio	Walt Disney Pictures
28	Mulan II	Mulan	February 1, 2005	Direct-to-video	Disney Animation Japan	Walt Disney Pictures
29	Pooh's Heffalump Movie	Winnie the Pooh	February 11, 2005	Theatrical	Disney Animation Japan	Walt Disney Pictures
30	Tarzan II	Tarzan	June 14, 2005	Direct-to-video	Disney Animation Australia	Walt Disney Pictures
31	Lilo & Stitch 2: Stitch Has a Glitch	Lilo & Stitch	August 30, 2005	Direct-to-video	Disney Animation Australia	Walt Disney Pictures
32	Pooh's Heffalump Halloween Movie	Winnie the Pooh	September 13, 2005	Direct-to-video	Project Firefly	Walt Disney Pictures
33	Kronk's New Groove	The Emperor's New Groove	December 13, 2005	Direct-to-video	N/A	Walt Disney Pictures
34	Bambi II	Bambi	February 7, 2006	Direct-to-video/Theatrical	Disney Animation Australia	Walt Disney Pictures
35	Brother Bear 2	Brother Bear	August 29, 2006	Direct-to-video	Disney Animation Australia Project Firefly	Walt Disney Pictures
36	The Fox and the Hound 2	The Fox and the Hound	December 12, 2006	Direct-to-video	Disney Animation Australia	Walt Disney Pictures
37	Cinderella III: A Twist in Time	Cinderella	February 6, 2007	Direct-to-video	Disney Animation Australia	Walt Disney Pictures
38	Disney Princess Enchanted Tales: Follow Your Dreams	Disney Princess	September 4, 2007	Direct-to-video	N/A	N/A
39	The Little Mermaid: Ariel's Beginning	The Little Mermaid	August 26, 2008	Direct-to-video	N/A	Walt Disney Pictures
40	Tinker Bell	Disney Fairies	October 28, 2008	Theatrical	Prana Studios	Walt Disney Pictures
41	Tinker Bell and the Lost Treasure	Disney Fairies	October 27, 2009	Theatrical	Prana Studios	Walt Disney Pictures
42	Tinker Bell and the Great Fairy Rescue	Disney Fairies	September 21, 2010	Theatrical	Prana Studios	Walt Disney Pictures
43	Secret of the Wings	Disney Fairies	October 23, 2012	Theatrical	Prana Studios	Walt Disney Pictures
44	Planes	Cars	August 9, 2013	Theatrical	Prana Studios	Walt Disney Pictures
45	The Pirate Fairy	Disney Fairies	April 1, 2014	Theatrical	Prana Studios	Walt Disney Pictures
46	Planes: Fire & Rescue	Cars	July 18, 2014	Theatrical	Prana Studios	Walt Disney Pictures
47	Tinker Bell and the Legend of the NeverBeast	Disney Fairies	March 3, 2015	Theatrical	Prana Studios	Walt Disney Pictures

=== Television specials ===
Title	Release type	Release date	Franchise
Pixie Hollow Games	Television special	November 18, 2011	Disney Fairies
Pixie Hollow Bake Off	Television special	October 20, 2013	Disney Fairies

=== Short films ===
Title	Release type	Release date	Franchise
The Cat That Looked at a King	Direct-to-video: DVD extra	December 14, 2004	Mary Poppins 40th Anniversary DVD
The Origin of Stitch	Direct-to-video: DVD extra	August 30, 2005	Lilo & Stitch
Winnie the Pooh: Shapes and Sizes	Direct-to-video	August 1, 2006	Winnie the Pooh
Winnie the Pooh: Wonderful Word Adventure	Direct-to-video	August 1, 2006	Winnie the Pooh
Legend of the Chihuahua	Direct-to-video: DVD extra	March 9, 2009	Beverly Hills Chihuahua DVD
Vitaminamulch: Air Spectacular	Direct-to-video	November 4, 2014	Cars, on Planes: Fire & Rescue DVD

=== Critical and public response ===
Film	Rotten Tomatoes	Metacritic	CinemaScore
DuckTales the Movie: Treasure of the Lost Lamp	100% (8 reviews)	—N/a	—N/a
