= Disneytoon Studios =

Former American animation studio

DisneyToon Studios
- Final logo, used from 2011 to 2018

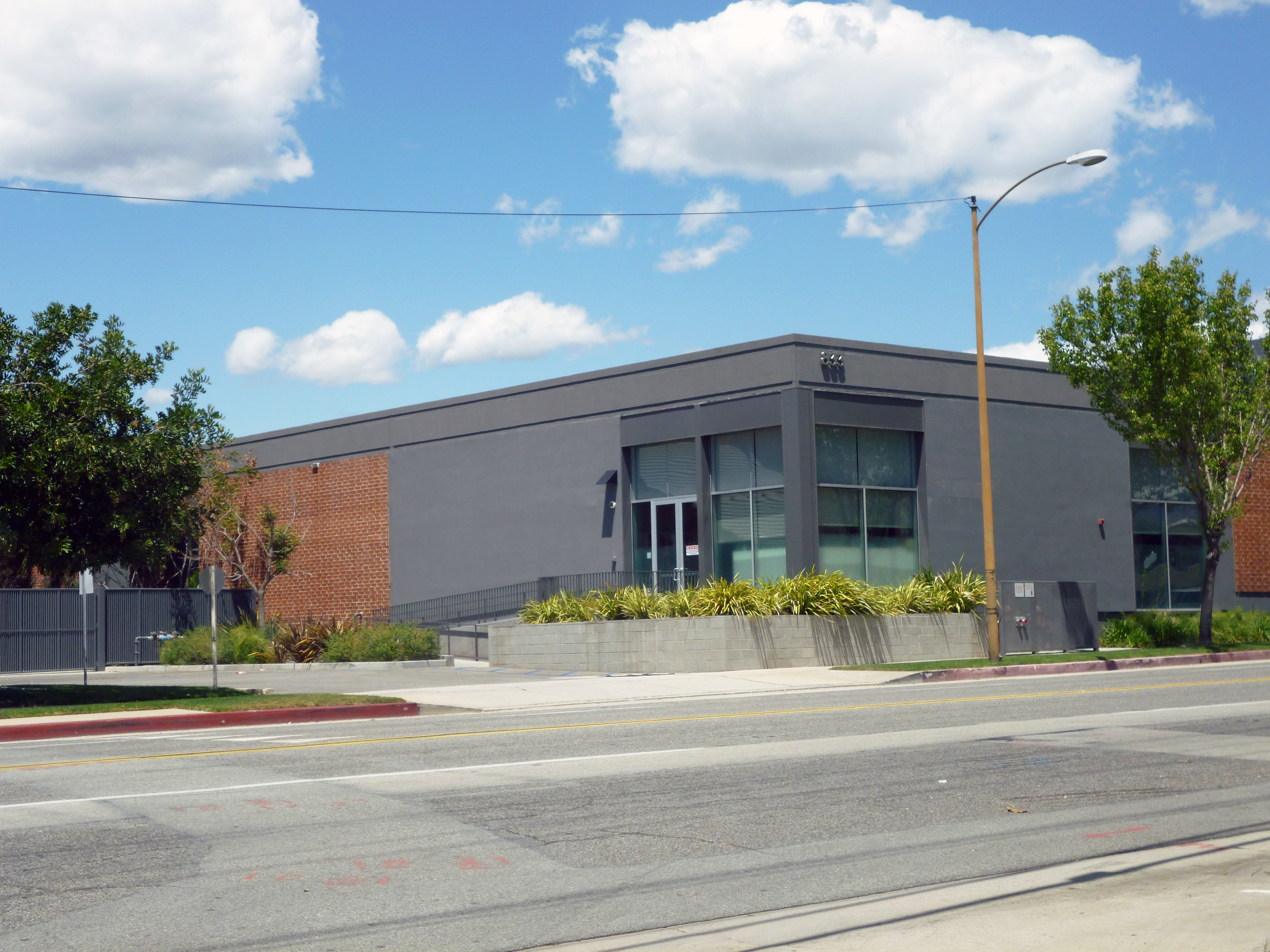
- DisneyToon Studios headquarters in Glendale, California, 2014.
- Formerly: Disney MovieToons (1990–1994); Disney Video Premieres (1994–2003)
- Type: Division
- Industry: Motion pictures
- Genre: Animation direct-to-video
- Founded: April 1, 1990; 36 years ago
- Founder: The Walt Disney Company
- Defunct: June 28, 2018; 8 years ago
- Fate: Closed; Building used as third animation unit for Disney Television Animation
- Headquarters: Disney Grand Central Creative Campus, Glendale, California, United States
- Area served: Worldwide
- Key people: Ed Catmull; (president, Disney Animation Studios); Meredith Roberts (SVP and GM)
- Products: Animated films
- Number of employees: 75 (2018)
- Parent: Walt Disney Television Animation (1990–2003); Walt Disney Animation Studios (2003–2018)

Disneytoon Studios (Note: Usually stylized as DisneyToon Studios.) (originally named Disney MovieToons and also formerly Walt Disney Video Premieres) was an American animation studio which created direct-to-video and occasional theatrical animated feature films. The studio was a division of Walt Disney Animation Studios, with both being part of the Walt Disney Studios, itself a division of the Walt Disney Company. The studio produced 47 feature films, beginning with DuckTales the Movie: Treasure of the Lost Lamp in 1990. Its final feature film was Tinker Bell and the Legend of the NeverBeast in 2015.

== History ==
=== Disney MovieToons/Walt Disney Video Premieres ===
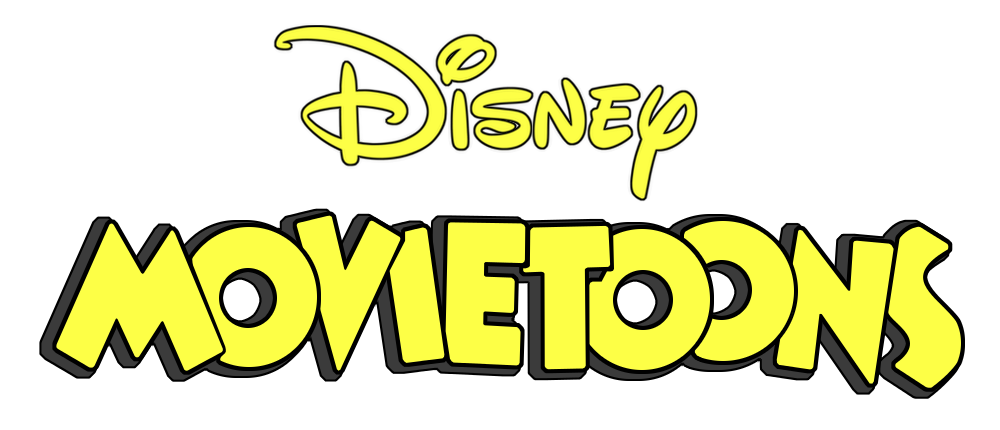
Disney MovieToons logo as seen on DuckTales the Movie: Treasure of the Lost Lamp

Disney MovieToons' first feature production was DuckTales the Movie: Treasure of the Lost Lamp in 1990, with animation by Walt Disney Animation France. Disney Television Animation hired director of specials, Sharon Morrill, in 1993.

Disney began producing direct-to-video (DTV) sequels of Walt Disney Feature Animation films: the first of which was the Aladdin (1992) sequel The Return of Jafar (1994). When Aladdin was selected as a possible candidate as an animated TV series (before the film's release), as with many animated series, the first three episodes were a multi-part story which Disney used as a potential "family movie special" for the Friday night before the series' premiere. The opening story was instead greenlit for a direct-to-video release. Thus with The Return of Jafar and its success, the direct-to-video unit was started. Then a second sequel, Aladdin and the King of Thieves (1996), assigned work to both the Australian and Japanese animation units.

In August 1994 with the departure of Walt Disney Studios chairman Jeffrey Katzenberg, its filmed entertainment business was split into two, with this division moved as a part of Walt Disney Television Animation into the newly created Walt Disney Television and Telecommunications under chairman Richard H. Frank.

Morrill was in charge of the above first Aladdin DTV film, launching Disney Video Premiere. Morrill expanded the DTV market making it more important for Disney, thus the overseas Disney studios were increased and assigned to these features. Morrill was promoted to vice president of the direct-to-video unit by November 1997.

The Walt Disney Television group, upon the departure of its president Dean Valentine in September 1997, was split into two units, Walt Disney Television (WDT) and Walt Disney Network Television (WDNT), reporting to Walt Disney Studios chairman Joe Roth. WDT would be headed by Charles Hirschhorn as president and consisted of Disney Telefilms and Walt Disney Television Animation, which included including Disney MovieToons and Disney Video Premiere.

The unit released a short under the WDTA name in 1997, Redux Riding Hood, which was nominated for a 1998 Academy Award. More direct-to-video sequels followed, among them Beauty and the Beast: The Enchanted Christmas (1997), Pocahontas II: Journey to a New World (1998), The Lion King II: Simba's Pride (1998), The Little Mermaid II: Return to the Sea (2000) and Cinderella II: Dreams Come True (2002). By April 1998, MovieToons was merged with the units of direct-to-video films and network TV specials as Morrill was promoted to executive vice president over her existing unit of DTV films, network TV specials and theatrical films. Ellen Gurney was promoted from director of DTV films, theatrical movies and specials to vice president in April 1999.

=== DisneyToon Studios ===
In a January 2003 reorganization of Disney, Disney MovieToons/Disney Video Premieres was transferred from Walt Disney Television Animation to Walt Disney Feature Animation and renamed DisneyToon Studios (DTS) in June. Morrill continued to lead the division as executive vice president. With the split, both DisneyToon and Disney Television Animation were issuing direct to video features.

Disney closed Disney Animation Japan, one of the two remaining internal overseas studios DisneyToon worked with, in June 2004, with Pooh's Heffalump Movie (2005) as its final DTS work. By March 2005, Morrill was promoted to president of DisneyToon. On July 25, 2005, Disney announced that it was closing DisneyToon Studios Australia in October 2006 after 17 years of existence, with its final feature being Cinderella III: A Twist in Time (2007).

In the early 2000s, DisneyToon joined Disney Consumer Products (DCP) as their internal video partner within the Disney conglomerate in developing the new Disney franchises, which then only consisted of Disney Princess and Disney Fairies. While DCP eyed other potential franchises, DTS looked into the Seven Dwarfs for a male-centric franchise to counterbalance the female-centric Fairies by 2005.

John Lasseter joined Disney with the purchase of Pixar in 2006, and made it known that he disliked DisneyToon's sequels and prequels, as he felt that they were undercutting the value of the original feature films. Following complications relating to the production of Tinker Bell (2008), the debut film of DCP's Fairies franchise, it led to discussions over the focus of the division. Thus, Morrill, president of the studio, moved to a new position in the company. On June 22, 2007, management of DisneyToon Studios was turned over to the control of Alan Bergman, president of Walt Disney Studios, with input from Ed Catmull and Lasseter. As chief creative officer, Lasseter called for the cancellation of all future films in production or development at DisneyToon Studios. As a result, planned or in-progress sequels to Pinocchio (1940), Dumbo (1941), The Aristocats (1970), Chicken Little (2005), and Meet the Robinsons (2007) were all cancelled, among other projects. Tinker Bell's animation was scrapped and was restarted while two projects that DCP formed as franchise projects were canceled, which were "Disney's Dwarfs" and the Disney Princess Enchanted Tales line after the latter's first DVD. The release of The Little Mermaid 3 was put on hold. Disney Studios president Alan Bergman went to oversee day-to-day operations of DTS. Thus DTS halted production of sequels and prequels when it originally indicated that the division would shift to support various Playhouse Disney franchises with direct-to-videos.

Meredith Roberts transferred from Walt Disney Television Animation to senior vice president and general manager of DisneyToon Studios in January 2008. At the April unveiling of Disney's animated feature lineup, it was announced that DisneyToon Studios would no longer produce future sequels to Disney animated films, but will instead focus on spin-offs. Also, the division was under the banner of the renamed Walt Disney Feature Animation studio, now called Walt Disney Animation Studios, led by Catmull and Lasseter.

In November 2017, Lasseter announced that he would be taking a six-month leave of absence after acknowledging what he called "missteps" in his behavior with employees in a memo addressed to the staff of DisneyToon Studios, Walt Disney Animation Studios, and Pixar. According to The Hollywood Reporter and The Washington Post, Lasseter had a history of alleged sexual misconduct towards employees. On June 8, 2018, it was announced that Lasseter would leave Disney Animation and Pixar at the end of the year, but would take on a consulting role until then.

DisneyToon Studios closed on June 28, 2018, resulting in a layoff of 75 animators and staff. As a result, the studio's third Planes film about the future of aviation in outer space was removed from both Disney's film release date schedule of April 12, 2019 and from development.

Since 2019, the studio building has been used as a third building for new productions for Disney Television Animation with Roberts being promoted new CEO at Disney Television Animation after the departure of long-time CEO Eric Coleman in 2019.

== Filmography ==
=== Feature films ===
As of 2002, the films that DisneyToon had made often had budgets less than $15 million for production, and had taken in $100 million in sales and rentals.

#	Title	Franchise	Release date	Release type	Animation service(s)	Other studio(s)
Disney MovieToons / Disney Video Premieres (Walt Disney Television Animation)
1	DuckTales the Movie: Treasure of the Lost Lamp	DuckTales	August 3, 1990	Theatrical	Disney Animation France	Walt Disney Pictures
2	The Return of Jafar	Aladdin	May 20, 1994	Direct-to-video	Disney Animation Australia; Disney Animation Japan	Walt Disney Television Animation
3	A Goofy Movie	Goof Troop	April 7, 1995	Theatrical	Disney Animation France; Disney Animation Australia; Phoenix Animation Studios	Walt Disney Pictures
4	Aladdin and the King of Thieves	Aladdin	August 13, 1996	Direct-to video	Disney Animation Australia; Disney Animation Japan	Walt Disney Television Animation
5	Pooh's Grand Adventure: The Search for Christopher Robin	Winnie the Pooh	August 5, 1997	Direct-to video	Disney Animation Japan	Walt Disney Television Animation
6	Beauty and the Beast: The Enchanted Christmas	Beauty and the Beast	November 11, 1997	Direct-to video	Disney Animation Australia; Disney Animation Canada	Walt Disney Television Animation
7	Belle's Magical World	Beauty and the Beast	February 17, 1998	Direct-to video	Toon City Inc. ThAI WANG FILM PRODUCTIONS CO., LTD.	Walt Disney Television Animation
8	Pocahontas II: Journey to a New World	Pocahontas	August 25, 1998	Direct-to video	Disney Animation Canada; Disney Animation Japan	Walt Disney Television Animation
9	The Lion King II: Simba's Pride	The Lion King	October 27, 1998	Direct-to video	Toon City Inc. Disney Animation Canada; Disney Animation Australia	Walt Disney Television Animation
10	Mickey's Once Upon a Christmas	Mickey Mouse	November 9, 1999	Direct-to video	Disney Animation Japan; Disney Animation Canada	Walt Disney Television Animation
11	Winnie the Pooh: Seasons of Giving	Winnie the Pooh	November 9, 1999	Direct-to video	Disney Animation Australia	Walt Disney Television Animation
12	The Tigger Movie	Winnie the Pooh	February 11, 2000	Theatrical	Walt Disney Television Animation; Walt Disney Animation Japan	Walt Disney Pictures
13	An Extremely Goofy Movie	Goof Troop	February 29, 2000	Direct-to-video	Disney Animation Australia	Walt Disney Television Animation
14	The Little Mermaid II: Return to the Sea	The Little Mermaid	September 19, 2000	Direct-to-video	Disney Animation Canada	Walt Disney Television Animation; Disney Animation Canada; Wang Film Productions
15	Lady and the Tramp II: Scamp's Adventure	Lady and the Tramp	February 27, 2001	Direct-to-video	Disney Animation Australia	Walt Disney Television Animation
16	Return to Never Land	Peter Pan	February 15, 2002	Theatrical	Disney Animation Australia; Disney Animation Canada; Disney Animation Japan; Cornerstone Animation	
17	Cinderella II: Dreams Come True	Cinderella	February 26, 2002	Direct-to-video	Disney Animation Japan; Walt Disney Pictures; Walt Disney Television Animation	
18	The Hunchback of Notre Dame II	The Hunchback of Notre Dame	March 19, 2002	Direct-to-video	Disney Animation Japan; Walt Disney Pictures; Walt Disney Television Animation	
19	Winnie the Pooh: A Very Merry Pooh Year	Winnie The Pooh	November 12, 2002	Direct-to-video	Disney Animation Japan; Walt Disney Pictures; Walt Disney Television Animation	
20	101 Dalmatians II: Patch's London Adventure	101 Dalmatians	January 21, 2003	Direct-to-video	Disney Animation Japan; Walt Disney Pictures; Walt Disney Television Animation	
Disney MovieToons (under Walt Disney Feature Animation)
21	The Jungle Book 2	The Jungle Book	February 14, 2003	Theatrical	Disney Animation Australia; Disney Animation France; Tandem Films; ToonCity Animation; Spaff Animation	Walt Disney Pictures
22	Piglet's Big Movie	Winnie the Pooh	March 21, 2003	Theatrical	Disney Animation Japan	Walt Disney Pictures
23	Atlantis: Milo's Return	Atlantis: The Lost Empire	May 20, 2003	Direct-to-video	Walt Disney Television Animation	Walt Disney Pictures
DisneyToon Studios
24	The Lion King 1½	The Lion King	February 10, 2004	Direct-to-video	Disney Animation Australia; Cornerstone Animation	Walt Disney Pictures
25	Winnie the Pooh: Springtime with Roo	Winnie the Pooh	March 9, 2004	Direct-to-video	Toon City	Walt Disney Pictures
26	Mickey, Donald, Goofy: The Three Musketeers	Mickey Mouse	August 17, 2004	Direct-to-video	Disney Animation Australia	Walt Disney Pictures
27	Mickey's Twice Upon a Christmas	Mickey Mouse	November 9, 2004	Direct-to-video	Blur Studio	Walt Disney Pictures
28	Mulan II	Mulan	December 28, 2004	Direct-to-video	Disney Animation Japan	Walt Disney Pictures
29	Pooh's Heffalump Movie	Winnie the Pooh	February 11, 2005	Theatrical	Disney Animation Japan	Walt Disney Pictures
30	Tarzan II	Tarzan	June 14, 2005	Direct-to-video	Toon City; Disney Animation Australia	Walt Disney Pictures
31	Lilo & Stitch 2: Stitch Has a Glitch	Lilo & Stitch	August 30, 2005	Direct-to-video	Australis; Disney Animation Australia (uncredited)	Walt Disney Pictures
32	Pooh's Heffalump Halloween Movie	Winnie the Pooh	September 13, 2005	Direct-to-video	Project Firefly	Walt Disney Pictures
33	Kronk's New Groove	The Emperor's New Groove	December 13, 2005	Direct-to-video	Toon City Animation Inc.	Walt Disney Pictures
34	Bambi II	Bambi	February 7, 2006	Direct-to-video/Theatrical	Disney Animation Australia	Walt Disney Pictures
35	Brother Bear 2	Brother Bear	August 29, 2006	Direct-to-video	Disney Animation Australia; Project Firefly	Walt Disney Pictures
36	The Fox and the Hound 2	The Fox and the Hound	December 12, 2006	Direct-to-video	Disney Animation Australia	Walt Disney Pictures
37	Cinderella III: A Twist in Time	Cinderella	February 6, 2007	Direct-to-video	Disney Animation Australia	Walt Disney Pictures
38	Disney Princess Enchanted Tales: Follow Your Dreams	Disney Princess	September 4, 2007	Direct-to-video	Toon City	N/A
39	The Little Mermaid: Ariel's Beginning	The Little Mermaid	August 26, 2008	Direct-to-video	Toon City	Walt Disney Pictures
40	Tinker Bell	Disney Fairies	October 28, 2008	Direct-to-video/Theatrical	Prana Studios	Walt Disney Pictures
41	Tinker Bell and the Lost Treasure	Disney Fairies	October 27, 2009	Direct-to-video/Theatrical	Prana Studios	Walt Disney Pictures
42	Tinker Bell and the Great Fairy Rescue	Disney Fairies	September 21, 2010	Direct-to-video/Theatrical	Prana Studios	Walt Disney Pictures
43	Secret of the Wings	Disney Fairies	October 23, 2012	Direct-to-video/Theatrical	Prana Studios	Walt Disney Pictures
44	Planes	Cars	August 9, 2013	Theatrical	Prana Studios	Walt Disney Pictures
45	The Pirate Fairy	Disney Fairies	April 1, 2014	Direct-to-video/Theatrical	Prana Studios	Walt Disney Pictures
46	Planes: Fire & Rescue	Cars	July 18, 2014	Theatrical	Prana Studios	Walt Disney Pictures
47	Tinker Bell and the Legend of the NeverBeast	Disney Fairies	March 3, 2015	Direct-to-video/Theatrical	Prana Studios	Walt Disney Pictures

=== Television specials ===
Title	Release type	Release date	Franchise
Pixie Hollow Games	Television special	November 18, 2011	Disney Fairies
Pixie Hollow Bake Off	Television special	October 20, 2013	Disney Fairies

=== Short films ===
Title	Release type	Release date	Franchise
The Cat That Looked at a King	Direct-to-video: DVD extra	December 14, 2004	Mary Poppins 40th Anniversary DVD
Winnie the Pooh: Shapes and Sizes	Direct-to-video	October 12, 2004	Winnie the Pooh
The Origin of Stitch	Direct-to-video: DVD extra	August 30, 2005	Lilo & Stitch
Winnie the Pooh: Wonderful Word Adventure	Direct-to-video	August 1, 2006	Winnie the Pooh
Legend of the Chihuahua	Direct-to-video: DVD extra	March 9, 2009	Beverly Hills Chihuahua DVD
Vitaminamulch: Air Spectacular	Direct-to-video	November 4, 2014	Cars, on Planes: Fire & Rescue DVD

=== Box office grosses (for theatrical releases only) ===
Film	Budget	Opening	Domestic	Worldwide
DuckTales the Movie: Treasure of the Lost Lamp	$20 million	$3.8 million	$18.1 million	$18.1 million
A Goofy Movie	$18 million	$6.1 million	$35.3 million	$37.6 million
Return to Never Land	$20 million	$11.9 million	$48.4 million	$115.1 million
The Jungle Book 2	$20 million	$11.4 million	$47.9 million	$135.7 million
Piglet's Big Movie	$46 million	$6 million	$23.1 million	$62.9 million
Pooh's Heffalump Movie	$20 million	$5.8 million	$18 million	$52.9 million
Bambi II	—N/a	—N/a	—N/a	$34.9 million
Tinker Bell	$50 million	—N/a	—N/a	$9.1 million
Tinker Bell and the Lost Treasure	$30–35 million	—N/a	—N/a	$8.5 million
Tinker Bell and the Great Fairy Rescue	$30–35 million	—N/a	—N/a	$10.8 million
Secret of the Wings	$30–35 million	—N/a	—N/a	$67 million
Planes	$50 million	$22.2 million	$90.2 million	$240.1 million
The Pirate Fairy	—N/a	—N/a	—N/a	$63.9 million
Planes: Fire & Rescue	$50 million	$17.5 million	$59.1 million	$146.9 million
Tinker Bell and the Legend of the NeverBeast	—N/a	—N/a	—N/a	$31.8 million

== See also ==
- List of Disney home entertainment
