= John Fiedler =

American actor (1925–2005)

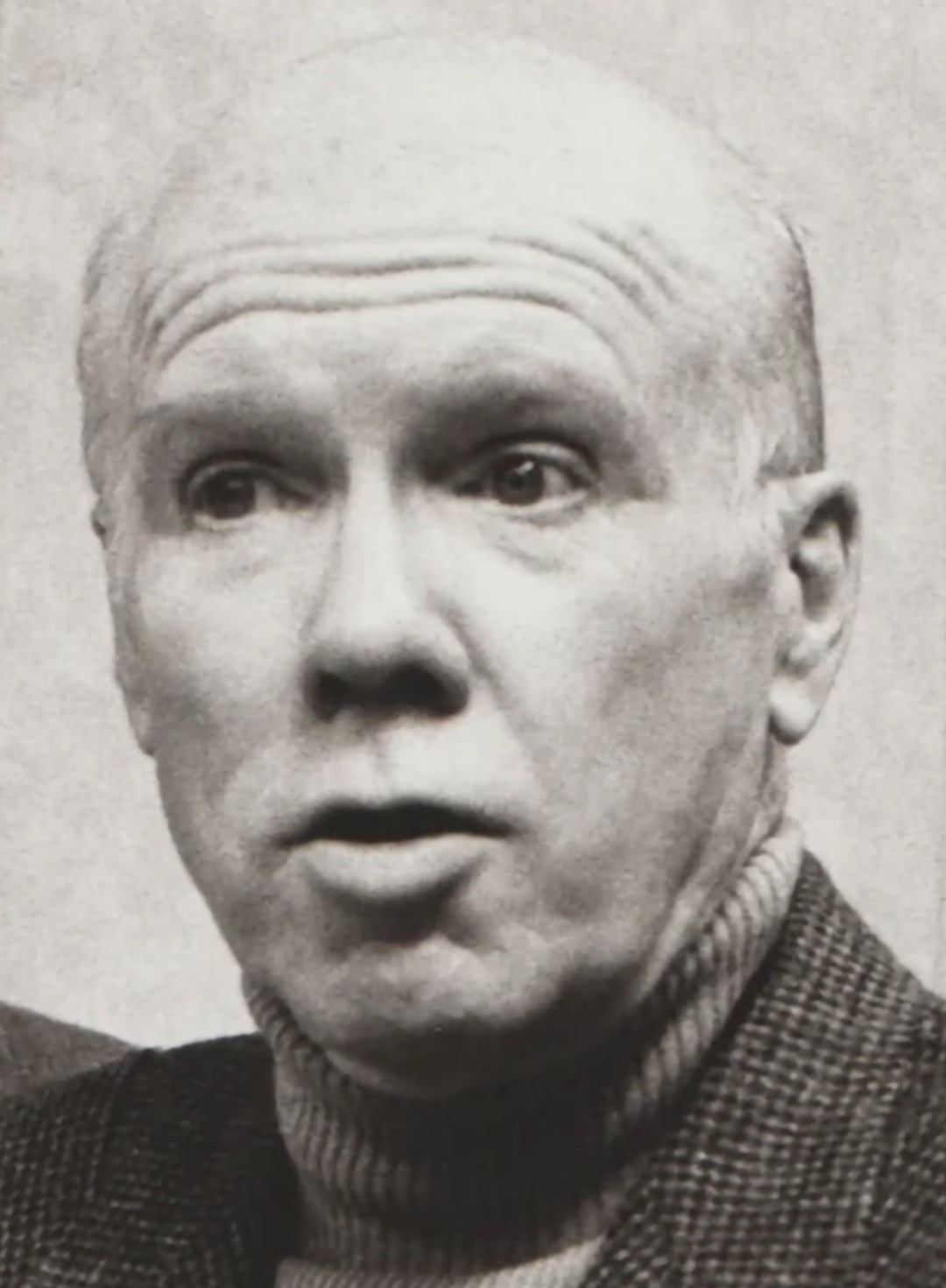
- Fiedler in Buffalo Bill, 1983
- Born: John Donald Fiedler; February 3, 1925; Platteville, Wisconsin, U.S.
- Died: June 25, 2005 (aged 80); Englewood, New Jersey, U.S.
- Occupation: Actor
- Years active: 1949–2005
- Military career
- Allegiance: United States
- Branch: United States Navy
- Service years: 1943–1945
- Rank: Seaman first class
- Conflicts: World War II

John Donald Fiedler (February 3, 1925 – June 25, 2005) was an American actor. Recognizable for his distinctive voice, Fiedler's career lasted more than 55 years in stage, film, television and radio.

Fiedler was typecast beginning early in his career for delicate, quiet, nerdy characters, although he also played sneaky villains. His roles include the meek Juror No. 2 in 12 Angry Men (1957); Mr. Lindner, the seemingly benign gentleman who tries to prevent the Younger family from moving into a whites-only neighborhood in A Raisin in the Sun (1961); the mean department store manager Mr. Dundee in the Twilight Zone episode "The Night of the Meek" (1962); the voice of Piglet in Disney's Winnie the Pooh productions (1966–2005); Vinnie, one of Oscar's poker cronies, in the film The Odd Couple (1968); milquetoast middle-aged patient Mr. Emil Peterson in The Bob Newhart Show (1972–1978); and neurotic stage manager Woody Deschler in Buffalo Bill (1983–1984).

== Early life ==
Fiedler was born in Platteville, Wisconsin, a son of beer salesman Donald Fiedler and his wife Margaret (née Phelan). He was of German and Irish descent. His family moved to Shorewood, Wisconsin, when he was five, where he graduated from Shorewood High School in 1943. He enlisted in the United States Navy and served until the end of World War II.

== Career ==
After his discharge from the Navy, Fiedler moved to Manhattan and attended the Neighborhood Playhouse, where his classmates included Tony Randall, James Doohan, Leslie Nielsen, Richard Boone and Joanne Woodward. He appeared as Homer Brown on the radio comedy The Aldrich Family, as Cadet Alfie Higgins on the 1950s TV show Tom Corbett, Space Cadet and, in his 1957 film debut, as Juror No. 2 in 12 Angry Men. Although best known for his portrayals of meek or high-strung characters, Fiedler occasionally played against type in roles such as the presidential assassin in an episode of I Spy, a school principal moonlighting as a pimp on Vegas, and Mr. Hengist, a Chief Administrator in the Star Trek episode "Wolf in the Fold" (1967).

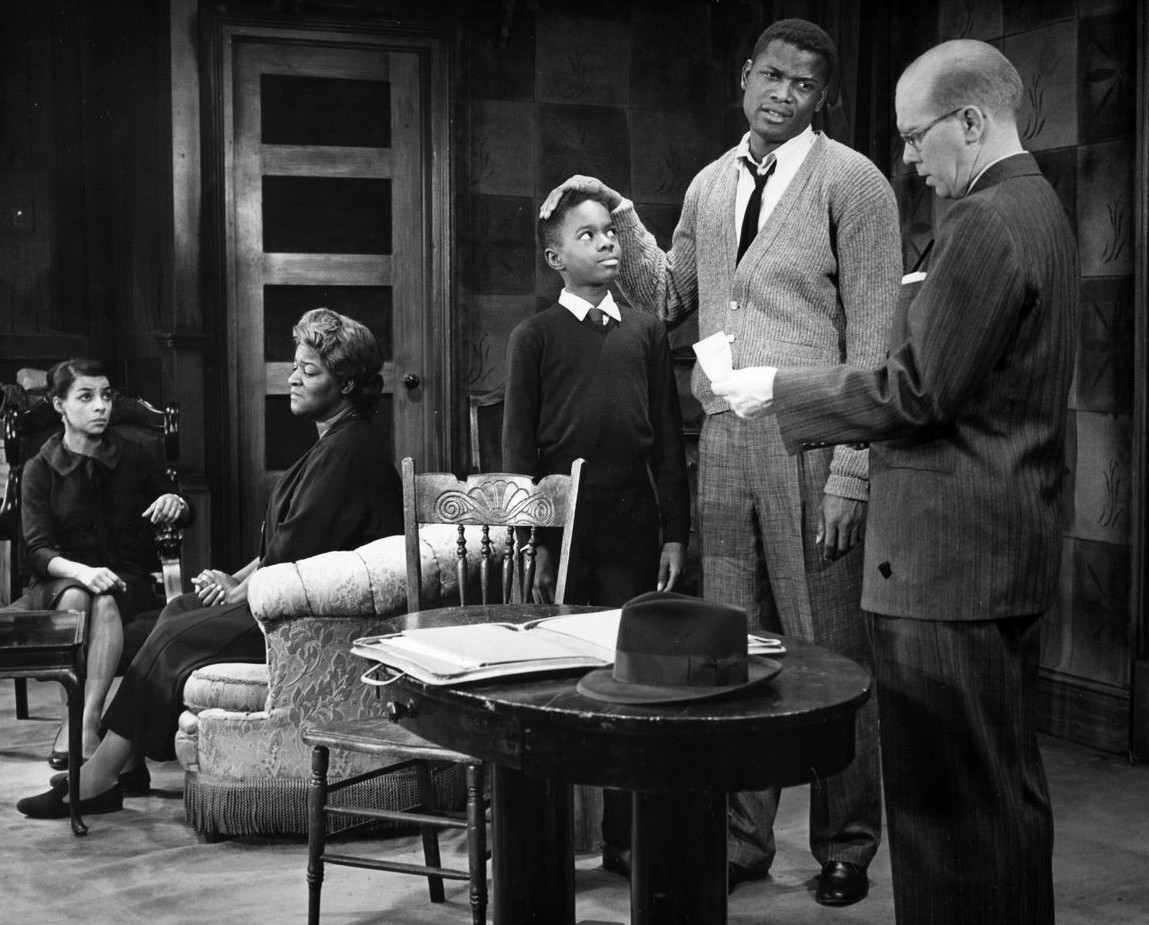
From the Broadway play Raisin in the Sun. L–R: Ruby Dee, Claudia McNeil, Glynn Turman, Sidney Poitier and John Fiedler (1959)

Fiedler was in the original cast of the Broadway play A Raisin in the Sun as housing committee representative Lindner, a role he reprised in both the 1961 film version and the 1989 TV version. He appears in the film The Odd Couple (1968) as poker player Vinnie; he also appears on the TV series adaptation of The Odd Couple, at the invitation of his friend Jack Klugman, as the manager of a hyper-security building into which Felix and Oscar temporarily move, and as the cruel owner of a movie-star dog. He also appears in the films Harper Valley PTA (1978) and The Cannonball Run (1981).

He appears three times in a recurring role on Kolchak: The Night Stalker as morgue attendant Gordy "The Ghoul" Spangler. He plays Mr. Peterson, one of Bob's regular patients, on The Bob Newhart Show, and Mr. Dundee in an episode of The Twilight Zone, "The Night of the Meek" (1960). His many other guest appearances on TV include Columbo, Have Gun – Will Travel, Peter Gunn, Alfred Hitchcock Presents, Perry Mason, Bonanza, Gunsmoke, Cannon, My Favorite Martian, The Munsters, Bewitched, Get Smart, A Touch of Grace, The Rockford Files, Three's Company, Quincy, M.E., The Golden Girls, Banacek and Cheers.

Fiedler worked frequently for Walt Disney Productions. During pre-production on Winnie the Pooh and the Blustery Day (1968), Walt Disney had heard Fiedler's voice on television and selected him as Piglet. He reprised the role in The Many Adventures of Winnie the Pooh (1977), Pooh's Grand Adventure: The Search for Christopher Robin (1997), The Tigger Movie (2000), Piglet's Big Movie (2003), Winnie the Pooh: Springtime with Roo (2004), Pooh's Heffalump Movie (2005) and Pooh's Heffalump Halloween Movie (2005). His voice is heard in further Disney films, including Robin Hood (1973), The Rescuers (1977), The Fox and the Hound (1981) and The Emperor's New Groove (2000). He also appeared in Disney's live-action films Rascal (1969), The Mystery in Dracula's Castle (1973), and The Shaggy D.A. (1976). His final film voice was the character Rudy in Kronk's New Groove (2005). Fiedler was also the narrator of several McDonaldland commercials during the 1980s (including when Birdie the Early Bird learns to fly and how the Hamburglar got his stripes).

== Death ==
Fiedler died of cancer on June 25, 2005, at age 80, in Englewood, New Jersey, at the Lillian Booth Actors Home, a residence for retired entertainers sponsored by the Actors' Fund of America. He was cremated and his ashes were scattered on Long Island, New York. Fiedler died a day after fellow Winnie-the-Pooh co-star Paul Winchell, who supplied the original voice of Tigger.

== Filmography ==
=== Film ===
- Lust for Gold (1949) as Barber (uncredited)
- 12 Angry Men (1957) as Juror 2
- Sweet Smell of Success (1957) as Counterman at Hot Dog Stand (uncredited)
- Stage Struck (1958) as Adrian
- That Kind of Woman (1959) as Eager Soldier (uncredited)
- A Raisin in the Sun (1961) as Karl Lindner
- That Touch of Mink (1962) as Mr. Smith
- The World of Henry Orient (1964) as Sidney
- Kiss Me, Stupid (1964) as Rev. Carruthers
- Guns of Diablo (1965) as Ives
- Girl Happy (1965) as Mr. Penchill
- A Fine Madness (1966) as Daniel K. Papp
- The Ballad of Josie (1967) as Simpson
- Fitzwilly (1967) as Mr. Morton Dunne
- The Odd Couple (1968) as Vinnie
- Winnie the Pooh and the Blustery Day (1968) as Piglet (voice)
- Rascal (1969) as Cy Jenkins
- True Grit (1969) as Lawyer Daggett
- The Great Bank Robbery (1969) as Brother Dismas Ostracorn - Explosives
- Suppose They Gave a War and Nobody Came (1970) as Maj. Purvis
- Making It (1971) as Ames
- The Out of Towners (1971) as conductor on train
- Honky (1971)
- Skyjacked (1972) as Robert Grandig
- Deathmaster (1972) as Pop
- Robin Hood (1973) as Father Sexton (voice, uncredited)
- Winnie the Pooh and Tigger Too (1974) as Piglet (voice)
- The Fortune (1975) as Photographer
- The Shaggy D.A. (1976) as Howie Clemmings
- The Many Adventures of Winnie-the-Pooh (1977) as Piglet (voice, archive footage)
- The Rescuers (1977) as Owl (voice)
- Harper Valley PTA (1978) as Bobby Taylor
- Boulevard Nights (1979) as Intern
- Midnight Madness (1980) as Wally Thorpe
- The Cannonball Run (1981) as Desk Clerk
- The Fox and the Hound (1981) as Porcupine (voice)
- Winnie the Pooh Discovers the Seasons (1981, short) as Piglet (voice)
- Sharky's Machine (1981) as Barrett
- Savannah Smiles (1982) as Grocery Clerk
- Winnie the Pooh and a Day for Eeyore (1983, short) as Piglet (voice)
- I Am the Cheese (1983) as Arnold
- Stephen King's Golden Tales as Arthur the Hotel Manager (1985, segment "The Old Soft Shoe")
- Seize the Day (1986) as Carl
- Winnie the Pooh Friendship: Tigger-ific Tales (1988, short) as Piglet (voice)
- Weekend with Kate (1990) as Fish seller
- Pooh's Grand Adventure: The Search for Christopher Robin (1997) as Piglet (voice)
- Winnie the Pooh: A Valentine for You (1999) as Piglet (voice)
- Winnie the Pooh Friendship: Pooh Wishes (1999, short) as Piglet (voice)
- Winnie the Pooh: Seasons of Giving as Piglet (voice, archive footage)
- The Tigger Movie (2000) as Piglet (voice)
- The Emperor's New Groove (2000) as Rudy (voice)
- The Book of Pooh: Stories from the Heart (2001) as Piglet (voice)
- Winnie the Pooh: A Very Merry Pooh Year (2002) as Piglet (voice)
- Piglet's Big Movie (2003) as Piglet (voice)
- Winnie the Pooh: Springtime with Roo (2004) as Piglet (voice)
- Pooh's Heffalump Movie (2005) as Piglet (voice)
- Pooh's Heffalump Halloween Movie (2005) as Piglet (voice, posthumous release)
- Kronk's New Groove (2005) as Rudy (voice) (final film role, posthumous release)

=== Television ===
- Tom Corbett, Space Cadet (1950-1955) (34 episodes) (episodes include "Ice Caves of Pluto" and "Danger in Deep Space") as Cadet Alfie Higgins
- All-Star Summer Revue (1952) (1 episode) as Charlie the Stagehand
- Studio One in Hollywood (1956-1957) (2 episodes)
  - (Season 8 Episode 25: "A Favor for Sam") (1956) as Irvin
  - (Season 9 Episode 38: "Death and Taxes") (1957) as Jouvin
- The United States Steel Hour (1957) (2 episodes)
  - (Season 4 Episode 24: "The Change in Chester") as Harold Train
  - (Season 5 Episode 7: "You Can't Win") as Boris
- Armstrong Circle Theatre (1957-1958) (2 episodes)
  - (Season 7 Episode 14: "Night Court") (1957) as Kean
  - (Season 8 Episode 8: "The Mummy Complex") (1958)
- Sunday Showcase (1960) (Season 1 Episode 21: "After Hours")
- The Twilight Zone (1960-1962) (2 episodes)
  - (Season 2 Episode 11: "The Night of the Meek") (1960) as Mr. Dundee
  - (Season 3 Episode 36: "Cavender Is Coming") (1962) as Field Rep No. 3
- General Electric Theater (1961) (Season 9 Episode 15: "Don't Let It Throw You") as Treasury Agent
- The Aquanauts (1961) (Season 1 Episode 19: "The Defective Tank Adventure") as Mr. Jacobs
- Peter Gunn (1961) (Season 3 Episode 22: "The Deep End") as Oliver Neilson
- Have Gun – Will Travel (1961) (Season 4 Episode 26: "The Gold Bar") as James Turner
- Peter Loves Mary (1961) (Season 1 Episode 22: "Getting Peter's Putter") as Clerk
- Pete and Gladys (1961) (Season 1 Episode 27: "The Fur Coat Story") as Charley Brown
- Checkmate (1961) (Season 1 Episode 35: "A Slight Touch of Venom") as Mr. Mitchie
- Brenner (1961) (Season 1 Episode 15: "The Thin Line") as Bax
- Dennis the Menace (1961) (Season 3 Episode 13: "Dennis' Bank Account") as Mr. Clute
- The Many Loves of Dobie Gillis (1961-1962) (4 episodes)
  - (Season 2 Episode 23: "I Didn't Raise My Boy to Be a Soldier, Sailor, or Marine") (1961) as Corporal Grover P. Wister
  - (Season 3 Episode 1: "The Ruptured Duck") (1961) as Mr. Wurts
  - (Season 3 Episode 9: "The Second Most Beautiful Girl in the World") (1961) as Mr. Bean
  - (Season 3 Episode 14: "I Do Not Choose to Run") (1962) as George G. Cheever
- Adventures in Paradise (1961-1962) (2 episodes)
  - (Season 2 Episode 17: "Man Eater") (1961) as Mr. Groper
  - (Season 3 Episode 26: "Blueprint for Paradise") (1962) as Professor Henry Hoag
- Alfred Hitchcock Presents (1961-1962) (2 episodes)
  - (Season 6 Episode 23: "Incident in a Small Jail") (1961) as Leon Gorwald
  - (Season 7 Episode 25: "The Last Remains") (1962) as Amos Duff
- Dr. Kildare (1961-1964) (3 episodes)
  - (Season 1 Episode 3: "A Shining Image") (1961) as Father Hughes
  - (Season 2 Episode 27: "Ship's Doctor") (1962) as D.V. Dromley
  - (Season 3 Episode 18: "Never Too Old for the Circus") (1964) as Mr. Calhoun
- Thriller (1962) (Season 2 Episode 19: "A Wig for Miss Devore") as Herbert Bleake
- 87th Precinct (1962) (Season 1 Episode 20: "A Bullet for Katie") as Cole
- Outlaws (1962) (Season 2 Episode 20: "No More Horses") as Ludlow Pratt
- The Alfred Hitchcock Hour (1962) (Season 1 Episode 4: "I Saw the Whole Thing") as Malcolm Stuart
- The Tall Man (1962) (Season 2 Episode 31: "A Time to Run") as Abner Moody
- Room for One More (1962) (Season 1 Episode 12: "The Real George") as Wilson
- The New Breed (1962) (Season 1 Episode 30: "Hail, Hail, the Gang's All Here") as Perkins
- Ichabod and Me (1962) (Season 1 Episode 31: "Lord Byron of Phippsboro")
- Bonanza (1963) (Season 4 Episode 32: "Rich Man, Poor Man") as Claude Miller
- Arrest and Trial (1963) (Season 1 Episode 2: "Isn't It a Lovely View") as Harry Simon
- My Favorite Martian (1963) (Season 1 Episode 5: "Man or Amoeba") as Science Professor Newton Jennings
- The Great Adventure (1963) (Season 1 Episode 7: "The Great Diamond Mountain") as Philip Arnold
- Bob Hope Presents the Chrysler Theatre (1963) (Season 1 Episode 5: "One Day in the Life of Ivan Denisovich") as Aleshka
- The Bill Dana Show (1964) (Season 1 Episode 15: "A Tip for Uncle Sam") as Oliver
- The Farmer's Daughter (1964) (Season 1 Episode 24: "The Swinger") as Dr. Watson
- The Travels of Jaimie McPheeters (1964) (Season 1 Episode 26: "The Day of the Reckoning") as Ives
- Destry (1964) (Season 1 Episode 8: "Deputy for a Day") as Bill Simpson
- The Fugitive (1964) (Season 1 Episode 30: "The End Game") as Sam Reed
- Broadside (1964) (Season 1 Episode 6: "The Great Lipstick War") as The Yardbird
- The Baileys of Balboa (1964) (Season 1 Episode 5: "Mutiny") as Johnson
- Perry Mason (1964) (Season 8 Episode 9: "The Case of the Tragic Trophy") as Howard Stark
- The Munsters (1964) (2 episodes)
  - (Season 1 Episode 2: "My Fair Munster") as Warren "Tiger" Bloom, Postman
  - (Episode: "My Fair Munster - Unaired Pilot 2") (1987)
- Gunsmoke (1964-1973) (2 episodes)
  - (Season 10 Episode 14: "Hammerhead") (1964) as Fitch Tallman
  - (Season 18 Episode 19: "A Quiet Day in Dodge") (1973) as Mr. Ballou
- The Donna Reed Show (1965) (Season 7 Episode 19: "Painter, Go Home") as Fred Johnson
- That Girl (1966) (Season 1 Episode 16: "Christmas and the Hard-Luck Kid") as Mr. Merriman
- Please Don't Eat the Daisies (1967) (Season 2 Episode 18: "The Thing's the Play") as Arlie Draper
- Captain Nice (1967) (Season 1 Episode 10: "Who's Afraid of Amanda Woolf?") as Gunnar
- Star Trek (1967) (Season 2 Episode 14: "Wolf in the Fold") as Administrator Hengist
- Get Smart (1967-1969) (2 episodes)
  - (Season 3 Episode 12: "Classification: Dead") (1967) as KAOS Agent Mr. Hercules
  - (Season 5 Episode 11: "Age Before Duty") (1969) as KAOS Agent Felix
- Bewitched (1967-1971) (6 episodes)
  - (Season 3 Episode 32: "Nobody But a Frog Knows How to Live") (1967) as Fergus F. Finglehoff
  - (Season 5 Episode 21: "Marriage Witch's Style") (1969) as Mr. Beams
  - (Season 6 Episode 10: "Daddy Comes to Visit") (1969) as Silas Bliss Jr.
  - (Season 6 Episode 11: "Darrin the Warlock") (1969) as Silas Bliss Jr.
  - (Season 6 Episode 29: "Turn on That Old Charm") (1970) as Augustus Sunshine
  - (Season 8 Episode 13: "Three Men and a Witch on a Horse") (1971) as Spengler
- Death Valley Days (1968) (Season 16 Episode 13: "The Great Diamond Mines") as prospector Johnny Slack
- The Felony Squad (1968) (Season 2 Episode 24: "Man on Fire") as B.G. Travis
- I Spy (1968) (Season 3 Episode 23: "Suitable for Framing") as Andrew
- One Life to Live (1968-1989) (2 episodes) (1968) as Gilbert Lange and (1989) (Episode dated July 21) as Virgil
- Insight (1970) (Episode 319: "The 7 Minute Life of James Houseworthy") as Griswald
- The Courtship of Eddie's Father (1971) (Season 2 Episode 14: "A Little Get Together for Cissy") as The Mild Man
- The Most Deadly Game (1971) (Season 1 Episode 12: "I, Said the Sparrow") as Alfred
- The Chicago Teddy Bears (1971) (Season 1 Episode 4: "The Alderman")
- The Doris Day Show (1971) (Season 4 Episode 7: "A Fine Romance") as Harvey Krantz
- Cannon (1971) (Season 1 Episode 14: "Flight Plan") as Brent
- Columbo (1972) (Season 1 Episode 7: "Blueprint for Murder") as Doctor
- Banacek (1972) (Season 1 Episode 2: "Project Phoenix") as Paddle
- Bridget Loves Bernie (1972) (Season 1 Episode 8: "Bernie's Last Stand") as Morrison
- Hec Ramsey (1972) (Season 1 Episode 3: "Mystery of the Green Feather") as Pingree
- The Odd Couple (1972-1974) (2 episodes)
  - (Season 2 Episode 15: "Security Arms") (1972) as G. Martin Duke (Head of Security)
  - (Season 5 Episode 5: "The Dog Story") (1974) as Mr. Hugo
- The Bob Newhart Show (1972–1978) (17 episodes) as Mr. Emil Peterson
- Banyon (1973) (Season 1 Episode 15: "Time Lapse") as Trumbull
- A Touch of Grace (1973) (Season 1 Episode 2: "The Weekend") as the Desk Clerk
- McMillan & Wife (1973) (2 episodes) as Simpson
  - (Season 3 Episode 2: "The Devil You Say")
  - (Season 3 Episode 3: "Freefall to Terror")
- Walt Disney's Wonderful World of Color (1973-1982) (5 episodes)
  - (Season 19 Episode 11: "The Mystery in Dracula's Castle: Part 1" (1973) as Bill Wasdahl
  - (Season 19 Episode 12: "The Mystery in Dracula's Castle: Part 2" (1973) as Bill Wasdahl
  - (Season 20 Episode 12: "The Whiz Kid and the Mystery at Riverton: Part 1") (1974) as Charles Blackburn
  - (Season 20 Episode 13: "The Whiz Kid and the Mystery at Riverton: Part 2") (1974) as Charles Blackburn
  - (Season 29 Episode 12: "Winnie the Pooh and Friends") (segment "Winnie the Pooh and Tigger Too") (1982) as Piglet (voice)
- Police Story (1974) (Season 1 Episode 15: "The Ripper") as Richard Steele
- Dirty Sally (1974) (Season 1 Episode 12: "The Hanging of Cyrus Pike") as Al Fromley
- The Streets of San Francisco (1974) (Season 3 Episode 4: "Mask of Death") as Mr. Winkler
- Kolchak: The Night Stalker (1974-1975) (3 episodes) as Gordon Spangler aka "Gordy the Ghoul" (Morgue Assistant)
  - (Season 1 Episode 2: "The Zombie") (1974)
  - (Season 1 Episode 3: "They Have Been, They Are, They Will Be...") (1974)
  - (Season 1 Episode 19: "The Youth Killer") (1975)
- The Manhunter (1975) (Season 1 Episode 22: "Trial by Terror") as Fletcher
- Great Performances (1975) (Season 2 Episode 13: "Who's Happy Now?") as Taylor
- Mobile One (1975) (Season 1 Episode 8: "The Crusader") as Walter James
- Phyllis (1975) (Season 1 Episode 12: "So Lonely I Could Cry") as Willis Enwright
- The Lost Saucer (1975) (Season 1 Episode 16: "Land of the Talking Plants") as Chloro Phil
- Jigsaw John (1976) (Season 1 Episode 10: "The Executioner") as Father Damis
- Ark II (1976) (Season 1 Episode 7: "The Cryogenic Man") as Norman Funk
- Alice (American TV series) (1976-1977) (2 episodes) as Orville
  - (Season 1 Episode 14: "Vera's Mortician") (1976)
  - (Season 1 Episode 24: "Mel's Happy Burger") (1977)
- Three's Company (1977) (Season 2 Episode 2: "Jack Looks for a Job") as Morris Morris
- Switch (1977) (Season 3 Episode 6: "Dancer") as Harry Winkler
- Tabitha (1977) (Season 1 Episode 7: "Arrival of Nancy") as Max
- The Rockford Files (1978) (Season 4 Episode 19: "The Competitive Edge") as James Bond
- Fantasy Island (1978) (2 episodes)
  - (Season 1 Episode 11: "Trouble, My Lovely/The Common Man") as Mortimer Fox
  - (Season 2 Episode 11: "Carnival/The Vaudevillians") as "Ace" Smith
- Quincy, M.E. (1978-1979) (2 episodes)
  - (Season 3 Episode 14: "Matters of Life and Death") (1978) as Howard Clausen
  - (Season 5 Episode 10: "For the Benefit of My Patients") (1979) as Mr. Weiss
- Vega$ (1979) (Season 1 Episode 17: "Demand and Supply") as S.J. Henderson
- The Ropers (1979) (Season 1 Episode 3: "Your Money or Your Life") as Bill Marsh
- B. J. and the Bear (1979) (Season 1 Episode 9: "Crackers") as Mr. Crocker
- Flying High (1979) (Season 1 Episode 15: "Eye Opener") as Potamkin
- The Last Resort (1980) (Season 1 Episode 13: "Dorm Window") as Slosser
- The Misadventures of Sheriff Lobo (1980) (2 episodes)
  - (Season 1 Episode 14: "Police Escort") as Mr. Parkhurst
  - (Season 1 Episode 18: "Perkins Bombs Out") as "Boomer" Barton
- Love, Sidney (1981) (Season 1 Episode 3: "The Party") as Dr. Rice
- Cheers (1982) (Season 1 Episode 3: "The Tortelli Tort") as Fred
- Hart to Hart (1982) (2 episodes) as Arnold
  - (Season 4 Episode 2: "With This Hart, I Thee Wed")
  - (Season 4 Episode 5: "Harts at High Noon")
- Father Murphy (1982) (Season 2 Episode 4: "Outrageous Fortune")
- Buffalo Bill (1983–1984) (26 episodes) as Woody Deschler
- Amazing Stories (1985) (Season 1 Episode 9: "Guilt Trip") as Man on Boat
- Tales from the Darkside (1986) (Season 2 Episode 18: "The Old Soft Shoe") as Arthur the Hotel Manager
- McDonaldland (1987) (Season 3 Episode 52: "Birdie Learns to Fly") as Narrator (voice)
- The New Adventures of Winnie the Pooh (1988–1991) (50 episodes) as Piglet (voice)
- American Playhouse (1989) (Season 8 Episode 1: "A Raisin in the Sun") as Karl Lindner
- The Golden Girls (1989) (Season 4 Episode 14: "Love Me Tender") as Eddie
- The Days and Nights of Molly Dodd (1989) (Season 3 Episode 9: "Here's Some Ducks All in a Row") as Norman Fuller
- They Came from Outer Space (1991) (Season 1 Episode 12: "Animal Magnetism") as Mr. Peterson
- Winnie the Pooh and Christmas Too (1991) (TV movie) as Piglet (voice)
- L.A. Law (1993) (Season 8 Episode 8: "Eli's Gumming") as Francis Pencava
- ABC Weekend Specials (1995) (Season 15 Episode 4: "Crash the Curiousaurus") as The Stranger
- Boo to You Too! Winnie the Pooh (1996) (TV short) as Piglet (voice)
- George & Leo (1997) (Season 1 Episode 8: "The Cameo Episode") as John
- A Winnie the Pooh Thanksgiving (1998) (TV movie) as Piglet (voice)
- Cosby (1999) (Season 3 Episode 13: "Refrigerator Logic") as Randy
- Winnie the Pooh: A Valentine for You (1999) (TV short) as Piglet (voice)
- House of Mouse (2001-2003) (3 episodes) as Piglet (voice)
  - (Season 1 Episode 5: "Unplugged Club") (2001)
  - (Season 4 Episode 1: "Goofy's Menu Magic") (2002)
  - (Season 4 Episode 7: "House of Turkey") (2003)
- The Book of Pooh (2001–2004) (33 episodes) as Piglet (voice)
- Winnie the Pooh: ABC's (2004) as Piglet (voice)
- Winnie the Pooh: 123s (2004) as Piglet (voice)
- Winnie the Pooh: Shapes and Sizes (2006) as Piglet (voice; posthumous role)
- Winnie the Pooh: Wonderful Word Adventure (2006) as Piglet (voice; posthumous role)

=== Video games ===
- My Interactive Pooh (1998) as Piglet (voice)
- The Book of Pooh: A Story Without A Tail (2002) as Piglet (voice)
- Kingdom Hearts (2002) as Piglet (voice)
- Piglet's Big Game (2003) as Piglet (voice)
- Winnie the Pooh's Rumbly Tumbly Adventure (2005) as Piglet (voice)

== Bibliography ==
- Messina, Elizabeth (2012). What's His Name? John Fiedler: The Man, The Face, The Voice. Bloomington, IN: AuthorHouse. ISBN 978-1-4685-5858-6.

Preceded by none	Voice of Piglet; 1968–2005	Succeeded by Travis Oates
