= Boo to You Too! Winnie the Pooh =

- VHS cover
- Based on: Winnie-the-Pooh by A. A. Milne
- Written by: Carter Crocker
- Directed by: Rob LaDuca
- Starring: Peter Cullen; Jim Cummings; John Fiedler; Michael Gough; Ken Sansom; Steve Schatzberg; John Rhys-Davies
- Music by: Mark Watters
- Countries of origin: United States; Philippines; Thailand
- Original language: English

Production
- Producer: Rob LaDuca
- Running time: 21 minutes
- Production companies: Walt Disney Television Animation; Toon City Animation, Inc. Thai Wang Film Productions

Original release
- Network: CBS
- Release: October 25, 1996

Boo to You Too! Winnie the Pooh is a 1996 American Halloween television special produced by Walt Disney Television Animation with the animation production done at Toon City Animation, Inc. in Manila, Philippines, along with the additional production at Thai Wang Film Productions in Bangkok, Thailand. Based on the Disney television series The New Adventures of Winnie the Pooh, it was originally broadcast on October 25, 1996 on CBS.

Phil Spencer won the 1997 Primetime Emmy Award for Outstanding Individual Achievement in Animation for his work on this film.

== Synopsis ==
On Halloween day, Winnie the Pooh and his friends are eager to go trick-or-treating. Piglet has never gone trick-or-treating, having always been too afraid of the frightening atmosphere of Halloween. After building an imposing mannequin in an attempt to face his fears, he joins his friends in preparation for trick-or-treating. Pooh's attempt to get honey from a bee hive ends in failure, and the bees chase the group into Rabbit's garden, destroying some of his pumpkins. As night falls and a thunderstorm looms, Tigger overzealously speaks of the horrors of Halloween, frightening Piglet enough that he runs home and barricades the door and windows.

Sympathetic to Piglet's fear, Pooh, Eeyore and Tigger decide to avoid the frightening aspects of Halloween and throw Piglet a less frightening "Hallo-wasn't" party instead. When the three costumed friends show up at Piglet's house, he mistakes them for a monster and flees. The trio of friends discover Piglet is missing, and go to search for him in the night. Simultaneously, Piglet goes looking for Pooh and the others, but when he can't find any of his friends, Piglet believes they've all been taken by "Spookables".

Still wearing their costumes, Pooh, Eeyore and Tigger make their way through the increasingly stormy night to find Piglet, but their fears get the best of them. Pooh's costume gets stuck in a tree branch, and the other two struggle to pull him out. Hearing Pooh's cries for help, Piglet happens upon the scene and believes two "Spookables" are attacking his friend. Determined to help his friend, Piglet summons his courage and uses his mannequin to seemingly rescue Pooh. When the mannequin collapses in the midst of the ensuing chaos, the others believe Piglet has vanquished the apparent monster. They commend Piglet for his bravery, and they all go trick-or-treating together.

== Cast ==
- John Fiedler as Piglet (speaking voice)
  - Steve Schatzberg as Piglet (singing voice)
- Jim Cummings as Winnie the Pooh and Tigger
- Peter Cullen as Eeyore
- Ken Sansom as Rabbit
- Michael Gough as Gopher
- John Rhys-Davies as The Narrator

== Movie connections ==
Boo to You Too! was also featured as a Halloween story in Pooh's Heffalump Halloween Movie, where the story is told by Roo (rather than the Narrator) while also happening at the same time. However Pooh and Tigger’s lines about mentioning Heffalumps were dubbed into Spookables due to the fact Lumpy is a Heffalump and Rabbit’s greenish fur was recolored into yellow so it wouldn’t look too similar from The New Adventures of Winnie the Pooh.

== See also ==
- List of Halloween films
