= A Valentine for You =

1999 Winnie the Pooh Valentine's Day TV special

- DVD cover
- Based on: Characters created by A. A. Milne
- Written by: Carter Crocker
- Directed by: Keith Ingham
- Starring: Jim Cummings; Paul Winchell; John Fiedler; Peter Cullen; Brady Bluhm; Ken Sansom; Michael Gough; Andre Stojka
- Narrated by: David Warner
- Music by: Carl Johnson
- Countries of origin: United States; Australia; Canada
- Original language: English

Production
- Running time: 22 minutes
- Production company: Walt Disney Television Animation

Original release
- Network: ABC
- Release: February 13, 1999

Winnie the Pooh: A Valentine for You is a Valentine's Day special based on A. A. Milne's stories, originally broadcast on ABC on February 13, 1999. A Valentine for You was released on VHS in 2000, 2001, and 2002, and on DVD in 2004 and 2010. It was made available for streaming on Disney+ on February 11, 2022.

The special included an original song, "Places in the Heart", by Michael and Patty Silversher.

This was the last TV special produced by Disney Television Animation to air on ABC until Mickey Saves Christmas, aired in a simulcast on ABC, Disney Channel, Disney Junior and Disney XD on November 27, 2022. It also marked the final role of Paul Winchell (voice of Tigger), who retired from voice acting soon after completing his work.

== Plot ==
The story begins with Winnie the Pooh searching for Christopher Robin. But he cannot find him, so he goes to Piglet's house to ask Piglet if he had seen him. While talking with Piglet, he struggles to hide the arts and crafts supplies from Pooh. But he is able to see what Piglet has been making. He finally admits that he is making a Valentine's Day card for Pooh. He and Piglet leave to find Christopher Robin. They, along with Rabbit, Tigger, Eeyore, and Gopher finally find him sitting near a log and is writing a card to someone called "Winifred". Not sure who that is, they go to ask Owl, who explains that a Winifred is a girl. He points out the reason while Christopher Robin is like this is because he's bitten by a smitten with love sickness, and this could mean he won't have time to play with Pooh and the others anymore. Pooh suggests finding a doctor. But Owl shoots that idea down as the smitten is the love bug who can only cure. Tigger suggests finding another smitten to cure him. He sets up a bait with Piglet dressed as a gentleman with a bouquet of flowers who quickly moves off the hill that he is standing on when he realizes that it is an anthill. Pooh then notices a small firefly-like creature on his honey pot, which they assume that it is the smitten, which then flies off into the forest. They then chase after it. But after a long search, they begin to worry over what it can do if it bites them. After Rabbit and Tigger describe unusual side effect that a smitten's bite can do in a song, they suddenly spot it and give chase. Pooh follows it down a path, leaving the others behind. Rabbit, Tigger, Gopher, and Eeyore, not sure which way to go, take different paths, leaving Piglet all alone.

Pooh finally catches it in a glass jar but finds himself lost and wonders around the woods until he tumbles down a cliff. Meanwhile, Gopher is still looking for Pooh while dragging who he thinks is Piglet until he realizes that he is pulling on a branch, startling him so much that he lets go and its loud snap scares Rabbit, whose echo scares Piglet, making him hide in a tree with holes. Tigger suddenly gets frightened by the tree that Piglet is hiding in (in which the holes resemble a scary face and Piglet's ears are like eyes) and falls into a pond. Pooh releases the smitten, who leads him to an open field. The others see the smitten's light and follow it to where Pooh is. They realize the smitten is not as scary as they thought after it brought them together from the dark woods. As the smitten reenters Pooh's jar, they proceed to look for Christopher Robin. After finding him, they try to cure him, but Christopher Robin stops them and presents the card he made for Winifred. Realizing how happy he is with his new friend, Pooh changes his mind and frees the smitten, much to his friends' dismay. Believing that his best friend is gone forever, Pooh returns home only to find a Valentine's Day card from Christopher Robin. Rabbit, Piglet, Gopher, Tigger, and Eeyore receive cards of their own while the smitten pays a visit to each of them. Pooh goes to show Christopher Robin the card he sent him. But Pooh wonders why since he had found a new friend. Christopher Robin explains, in song, that he is still his best friend no matter what. The others join them and they all stand on a cliff to watch the beautiful red sunrise on Valentine's Day, ending the story as Pooh and his friends learn that the heart is big and always has room for friends – old and new.

== Cast ==
- Jim Cummings as Winnie the Pooh and Tigger's singing voice
- Paul Winchell as Tigger (final film role)
- John Fiedler as Piglet
  - Steve Schatzberg as Piglet's singing voice
- Brady Bluhm as Christopher Robin
  - Frankie J. Galasso as Christopher Robin's singing voice
- Peter Cullen as Eeyore
- Ken Sansom as Rabbit
- Andre Stojka as Owl
- Michael Gough as Gopher
- David Warner as The Narrator

== Notes ==
- In its premiere broadcast, the special aired on a one-hour slot, which was filled up by an episode of The New Adventures of Winnie the Pooh ("Groundpiglet Day") and shorts from the then-upcoming Mickey Mouse Works television show.
- Kanga and Roo do not appear in this show, only as toy animals in the opening.
- This was also the last time Paul Winchell provided the speaking voice for Tigger.
