= Gopher (Winnie the Pooh) =

Fictional gopher from Disney's Winnie-the-Pooh stories

- First appearance: Winnie the Pooh and the Honey Tree (1966)
- Created by: Walt Disney; John Lounsbery
- Voiced by: Howard Morris (1966–1977); Michael Gough (1988–present)

In-universe information
- Species: Gopher
- Gender: Male

Gopher is a fictional anthropomorphic gopher character who first appeared in the 1966 Disney animated film Winnie the Pooh and the Honey Tree. He has a habit of whistling out his sibilant consonants, one of various traits he has in common with the beaver in Lady and the Tramp, by whom he may have been inspired.

== Character ==
=== Creation ===
Gopher was the only character in the original shorts who was an original character and not based on a character from the A.A. Milne books, a fact he notes in his first appearance when he says "I'm not in the book, but I'm at your service!" Instead, he was initially developed by Disney as a replacement for Piglet, although it was ultimately decided to keep Piglet involved in the stories as well as use Gopher. Apparently, the proposed character of Gopher was thought to have a more "folksy, all-American, grass-roots image" than Piglet. While American audiences loved the character, British audiences were less pleased.

Like most Winnie-the-Pooh characters, Gopher is named after his own species.

Gopher is also known for his unique voice characterization. He tends to whistle his consonants, particularly his S's. This is lampshaded in his debut; when Pooh mimics Gopher while asking for honey, Gopher tells Pooh he should do something about the speech impediment he himself has, before handing him the honey.

=== Personality ===
Gopher has a fairly brash personality, with a tendency to talk in circles. Though presenting himself as a helpful handyman, he often rambles, dodges questions, and gives bad advice which usually leads to misunderstandings resulting in others becoming annoyed and refusing his service or vice versa. He is rarely seen outside of his burrow so not much is known about him socially. He is also quite easily offended, repeatedly storming off to his burrow and comedically falling down his mine shafts in these instances. Though short-tempered, he is shown to be a very skilled, hard worker, especially in his mine shafts (tunnels) and spends most of his time tediously working on them. He is also genuinely resourceful at times and shown to have a surprisingly tender and thoughtful side, such as when he remembers how his Grandpappy's forgotten lifelong dream of building an above-ground-underground city, and takes this project upon himself to please his Grandpappy. Despite his low social life, when Gopher does make an appearance he is constantly running at the mouth; with his trademark speech impediment of whistling out his sibilant consonants.

== Appearances ==
While he never made appearances in any episodes of Welcome to Pooh Corner, Gopher was fleshed out a bit further in the television series The New Adventures of Winnie the Pooh. He is portrayed as generally hard-working, especially in his tunnels (which he inevitably falls into at least once). He does not appear in the original books Winnie-the-Pooh and The House at Pooh Corner by A. A. Milne (a fact that is regularly pointed out in Winnie the Pooh and the Honey Tree, when he seemingly breaks the fourth wall by saying he's "not in the book, y'know", the double meaning that he is an unlisted contractor). Gopher's voice was originally done by Howard Morris, who later departed from the role and was replaced by Michael Gough for all subsequent productions.

Gopher's other appearances in Winnie the Pooh-related media include the television specials A Winnie the Pooh Thanksgiving, Winnie the Pooh: A Valentine for You, and Boo to You Too! Winnie the Pooh, the direct-to-video film A Very Merry Pooh Year, and the direct-to-video special Winnie the Pooh: 123's.

He also made minor appearances in the television series House of Mouse, the video game Kingdom Hearts II, and Pooh's Heffalump Halloween Movie (in archive footage from Boo to You Too! Winnie the Pooh). This was Gopher's last appearance in any form of media until the release of Kingdom Hearts III in January 2019, after nearly thirteen years of absence. Four years later, he was also added as a playable character in the video game Disney Magic Kingdoms.

Like other Walt Disney Animation Studios characters, he has a cameo appearance in the 2023 short film Once Upon a Studio.
