= The Tigger Movie =

2000 animated Disney film directed by Jun Falkenstein

- Theatrical release poster
- Directed by: Jun Falkenstein
- Screenplay by: Jun Falkenstein
- Story by: Eddie Guzelian
- Based on: Characters created by A. A. Milne
- Produced by: Cheryl Abood
- Starring: Jim Cummings; Nikita Hopkins; Ken Sansom; John Fiedler; Peter Cullen; Andre Stojka; Kath Soucie; Tom Attenborough; John Hurt
- Edited by: Makoto Arai; Robert Fisher, Jr.
- Music by: Harry Gregson-Williams
- Production company: Walt Disney Television Animation (Note: Animation services handled by Walt Disney Animation Japan.)
- Distributed by: Buena Vista Pictures Distribution (Note: Distributed under the Walt Disney Pictures banner.)
- Release date: February 11, 2000 (United States)
- Running time: 77 minutes
- Country: United States
- Language: English
- Budget: $15–$30 million
- Box office: $96.2 million

The Tigger Movie is a 2000 American animated musical comedy-drama film produced by Walt Disney Television Animation. Written and directed by Jun Falkenstein, it is the second theatrical Winnie the Pooh feature film, following The Many Adventures of Winnie the Pooh (1977). It features Pooh's friend Tigger searching for his family tree and other Tiggers like himself.

The film was the first feature-length theatrical Winnie the Pooh film that was not a collection of previously released shorts. It is also the first in the original films in which Tigger is voiced entirely by Jim Cummings (in addition to Winnie the Pooh) following the retirement of Tigger's original voice actor Paul Winchell in 1999. Since 1989, Cummings' had shared the role with Winchell and provided his singing voice in most projects, with Winchell as the character's speaking voice. The film features original songs from the Sherman Brothers.

The Tigger Movie was originally planned as a direct-to-video release in 2001, until then–Disney CEO Michael Eisner heard the songs and decided to release the film in theaters a year early. It was released in the United States on February 11, 2000 by Buena Vista Pictures Distribution. The film received generally positive reviews from critics and grossed $96 million.

The film received three nominations at the Annie Awards, including Best Direction, Best Voice Acting, and Best Music.

== Plot ==
In the Hundred Acre Wood, Tigger looks for someone to bounce with but finds his friends busy preparing for winter. While searching for a playmate, he accidentally destroys Eeyore's house with a boulder. Although he helps remove it, Tigger then unintentionally breaks Rabbit's pulley system, leading the group to admonish for his recklessness. Hurt by their words, Tigger confides in his closest friend, Roo, who asks whether Tigger has a family of his own. Inspired by the idea, Tigger resolves to find his relatives.

Misinterpreting advice from Owl, Tigger and Roo search for his "family tree", believing it to be a literal striped tree full of Tiggers, but they come up empty-handed. Following Roo's suggestion, Tigger writes a letter to his family and lets the wind carry it away, but after several days without a reply, he loses hope. Wanting to cheer him up, Tigger's friends compose a letter signed "your family". Believing his relatives are coming to visit the next day, Tigger throws a party in their honor. Unable to tell him the truth, Roo convinces the others to disguise themselves as Tiggers and attend.

Despite their efforts, the ruse collapses when Roo's mask falls off while trying to do a difficult bounce that Tigger had taught him. Feeling betrayed, Tigger storms off into a blizzard to continue his search. He eventually comes across a massive tree covered in stripes of snow and mistakes it for his family tree, only to find it empty. Meanwhile, Roo misses Tigger and he and the others form an expedition to find him and convince Rabbit to lead them. When the group arrives to retrieve Tigger, their quarrel accidentally triggers an avalanche. Tigger rescues the group by bringing them to safety but is himself swept away. Roo recalls Tigger's special bounce, uses it successfully, and saves him as Owl, Kanga and eventually Christopher Robin appears. Afterward, Tigger learns that his friends wrote the letter, realizes they are his true family, and hosts a new party in their honor.

== Cast ==
- Jim Cummings as Tigger and Winnie the Pooh
- Nikita Hopkins as Roo
- John Fiedler as Piglet
- Peter Cullen as Eeyore
- Ken Sansom as Rabbit
- Kath Soucie as Kanga
- Andre Stojka as Owl
- Tom Attenborough as Christopher Robin
- John Hurt as The Narrator

== Production ==
Jun Falkenstein directed the film, in her own feature length debut, following her work on A Winnie the Pooh Thanksgiving. The film began production in April 1998. Many scenes, totaling up to 60% of the film, were completed by Walt Disney Animation Japan. Drawing inspiration from the end of Winnie the Pooh and Tigger Too when Tigger agrees to not bounce anymore, the film crafted a fuller character arc that "[showed] a range of emotions" for Tigger.

=== Voice cast ===
Paul Winchell, the original voice of Tigger, was originally cast to voice Tigger for the film, which was then titled Winnie the Pooh and the Family Tree. During the spring of 1998, Winchell participated in a single recording session for the film. However, he was dropped from the project after the studio found his voice too raspy. The role was given to Jim Cummings, who was already voicing Winnie the Pooh for the film, and had voiced Tigger on various Disney television shows and for Disney consumer products. When the Disney Imagineers heard about Winchell's dismissal, they hired him to perform the voice of Tigger for The Many Adventures of Winnie the Pooh attraction at the Magic Kingdom, which opened a year before The Tigger Movie's release; it was Winchell's final performance before his retirement from acting in 1999 and his death in 2005.

=== Music ===
The songs for The Tigger Movie were written by Robert and Richard Sherman who had not written a feature for Disney in over 28 years. Their last fully original feature film score was for the Oscar nominated film, Bedknobs and Broomsticks which was released in 1971. The Tigger Movie would also be the last film work for the Sherman Brothers. Robert B. Sherman died in London on March 6, 2012 at the age of 86 and Richard M. Sherman died of "age-related illness" at the Cedars-Sinai Medical Center in Los Angeles, on May 25, 2024 at the age of 95. Originally slated for video or television release, the demo cut of the score was so well received by then Disney CEO, Michael Eisner, that the project's priority level moved up to feature theatrical release. The score of the film is composed by Harry Gregson-Williams with additional music by Klaus Badelt and Steve Jablonsky and the score was conducted by Nick Glennie-Smith.

All the songs were original ones created for the film except for "The Wonderful Thing About Tiggers" which was originally written in 1968 for the featurette, Winnie the Pooh and the Blustery Day (released in 1968). That song was also by the Sherman Brothers. The "punch line" of the song: "But the most wonderful Thing About Tiggers is I'm the only one..." provides the basis of The Tigger Movie's storyline. Most of the songs, including "Someone Like Me", "Whoop-de-Dooper Bounce", "Pooh's Lullabee", and "Round My Family Tree" were performed by Jim Cummings, while "How to Be a Tigger" was performed by the cast.

"Your Heart Will Lead You Home" was the last song written for the film and is a collaborative effort between the Sherman Brothers and singer Kenny Loggins. Richard Sherman described the song as "a song about the picture, as opposed to songs of the picture." It marks the only time the trio worked together on a song.

=== Songs ===
Original songs performed in the film include:

No.	Title	Performer(s)	Length
1.	"The Wonderful Thing About Tiggers"	Jim Cummings
2.	"Someone Like Me"	Cummings
3.	"Whoop-De-Dooper Bounce"	Cummings, Nikita Hopkins	2:09
4.	"Pooh's Lullabee"	Cummings	1:36
5.	"Round My Family Tree"	Cummings	2:50
6.	"How to Be a Tigger"	Cummings, Hopkins, Peter Cullen, Kath Soucie, Andre Stojka, John Fiedler
7.	"Your Heart Will Lead You Home"	Kenny Loggins	4:22

== Releases ==
The film was originally intended to be released straight-to-video, akin to most Disney spin-offs and sequels, but was instead bumped up to a theatrical release.

=== Marketing ===
Disney released a teaser trailer for The Tigger Movie in August 1999, during theatrical screenings of The Iron Giant. The teaser was later attached to theatrical screenings of The Adventures of Elmo in Grouchland, Toy Story 2 and Stuart Little. It was also included on the Winnie the Pooh: Seasons of Giving home video release.

The original theatrical trailer for the film featured the song Semi-Charmed Life by Third Eye Blind. The song is about crystal meth addiction and sex but was presumably chosen for the trailer because of its bright, catchy sound and also Disney initially didn't know about the meaning behind the song. Although the parts of the song used in the trailer didn't feature the explicit lyrics, there was a public outcry about the inappropriateness of its use in the trailer for a children's movie. Once informed of the song's meaning, Disney recalled the original trailer and replaced the song with a much more kid-friendly one.

=== Theatrical ===
After a Hollywood red carpet premiere on February 6, 2000 at El Capitan Theatre, the film was released theatrically on February 11, 2000. The movie was on screens for 23 weeks.

=== Home media ===
The Tigger Movie was originally released on August 22, 2000, on both VHS and DVD. The film was later re-released on a 2-disc DVD edition on August 4, 2009 to coincide with its 10th anniversary and includes two bonus episodes of The New Adventures of Winnie the Pooh "King of the Beasties" and "Tigger’s Houseguest." The 2-disc release includes a DVD and a digital copy. The film was also re-released as a Bounce-a-rrrific special edition on Blu-ray on August 21, 2012.

== Reception ==
=== Box office ===
The film opened at number 4 at the US box office behind Scream 3, The Beach and Snow Day, making $9.4 million in its opening weekend. The film was a box office success, earning $45,554,533 in the United States and Canada and a further $50,605,267 overseas, resulting in a worldwide gross of $96,159,800. Its budget is estimated at between $15 million and $30 million. On its initial release on home video, it earned $90 million.

=== Critical reception ===
On Rotten Tomatoes, the film has an approval rating of 63% based on 72 reviews, with an average rating of 5.9/10. The site's consensus states, "The Tigger Movie may lack the technological flash and underlying adult sophistication of other recent animated movies, but it's fun and charming." On Metacritic, the film has a weighted average score of 53 out of 100, based on 23 critics, indicating "mixed or average reviews". Audiences polled by CinemaScore gave the film an average grade of "A" on an A+ to F scale.

William Thomas of Empire gave the film a three out of four stars, saying: "And while the one-dimensional nature of the plot is unlikely to entertain anyone over the age of 11, the end result certainly includes enough pre-pubescent prerequisites to ensure that the furry fella will never bounce alone." Common Sense Media gave the film a three out of five stars and said: "Tigger's bouncy quest will appeal to younger viewers."

=== Accolades ===
Award	Category	Recipient	Result
Annie Awards	Annie Award for Directing in a Feature Production	Jun Falkenstein	Nominated
Annie Awards	Annie Award for Voice Acting in a Feature Production	Nikita Hopkins as Roo	Nominated
Annie Awards	Annie Award for Music in a Feature Production	Richard M. Sherman and Robert B. Sherman for the song "Round My Family Tree"	Nominated
Las Vegas Film Critics Society Awards	Best Family Film	Jun Falkenstein and Cheryl Abood	Nominated
Golden Tomato Awards 2011	Best Animated Film	The Tigger Movie	4th Place
Oppenheim Toy Portfolio Gold Award	Best Animated Feature	Jun Falkenstein	Nominated

== In other media ==
=== Sequels ===
Disney released various theatrical and direct-to-videos in the years that followed. There were two theatrical animated films: Piglet's Big Movie in 2003 and Pooh's Heffalump Movie in 2005. Two direct-to-video animated films also followed, Winnie the Pooh: Springtime with Roo in 2004 and Pooh's Heffalump Halloween Movie in 2005.

== See also ==
- Winnie the Pooh (franchise)
- List of Disney theatrical animated features
