= Toon City =

Filipino-Canadian animation studio

Toon City Animation
- Logo used since 2023
- Type: Private
- Founded: 1993; 33 years ago
- Founder: Colin Baker
- Headquarters: Manila, Philippines
- Key people: Juan Miguel Del Rosario (CEO); Rene De Guzman (Resources Development); Ricky Gundran (Chief Finance Officer); Migs del Rosario (Chief Development Officer); Danilo Pateño (Resources Development Director); Chrissie Chan (Executive Assistant)
- Website: tooncityanimation.com

Toon City is a Philippine-Canadian animation studio located in Manila, Philippines and Vancouver, British Columbia, Canada. They have produced outsourcing animation for The Walt Disney Company, Nickelodeon, Universal, Warner Bros., HBO and CinéGroupe.

Toon City was founded in 1993 by Colin Baker with roughly ten animators. Their first series work was for Bonkers. In 2023, Toon City opened a new location in Vancouver, Canada. The studio currently has a floor space of over 3000 square meters and can accommodate over one thousand artists producing the animation in traditional 2D, Flash, CGI and paperless Harmony.

== List of animated films and TV series ==
Toon City has provided animation for:

=== TV series ===
TV series	Studio	Years	Notes
50/50 Heroes	Cyber Group Studios	2022–present	
The 7D	Disney Television Animation	2014–2016	
101 Dalmatians: The Series	Walt Disney Television Animation; Jumbo Pictures	1997–1998	
Aladdin: The Series	Walt Disney Television Animation	1994–1995	Season 2
Angry Birds Toons	Rovio Entertainment	2013–2016	
The Awesomes	Broadway Video; Sethmaker Shoemeyers Productions; Bento Box Entertainment	2013	"No Mo' Sumo"
Big Hero 6: The Series	Disney Television Animation	2019–2020	Season 2
Bonkers	Walt Disney Television Animation	1993–1994	Group 4
Brandy & Mr. Whiskers	Walt Disney Television Animation	2004–2006	
Bratz	MGA Entertainment; Mike Young Productions	2005–2008	
Brickleberry	Fox 21	2013–2015	Seasons 2–3
Bro'Town	Firehorse Films	2004–2009	
Bunnicula	Warner Bros. Animation	2016–2018	
Buzz Lightyear of Star Command	Walt Disney Television Animation; Pixar Animation Studios	2000	
Care Bears: Unlock the Magic	Copernicus Studios	2019–2024	
Chloe's Closet	MoonScoop	2010	Season 1, 7 episodes only
Coach Me if You Can	Xilam	2020–2021	
Counterfeit Cat	Tricon Kids & Family; Wildseed Kids	2016–2017	Additional animation
Curious George	Universal Animation Studios; Imagine Entertainment	2006–2022	
DuckTales	Disney Television Animation	2017–2020	
The Emperor's New School	Walt Disney Television Animation	2006–2008	
Fatherhood	Smiley Inc.	2004	Additional animation for "Balancing the Books"
Fillmore!	Walt Disney Television Animation	2002	"Ingrid Third, Public Enemy #1"
The Freak Brothers	Pure Imagination Studios	2021	Season 1
Gargoyles	Walt Disney Television Animation	1995–1996	"The Cage" and "Kingdom"
Geronimo Stilton	MoonScoop; Rai Fiction; Atlantyca Entertainment	2009–2012	Seasons 1–2
Hazbin Hotel	SpindleHorse Toons; Bento Box Entertainment; A24; Amazon MGM Studios	2024–present	
Hercules: The Animated Series	Walt Disney Television Animation	1998–1999	
Hero: 108	Gamania	2010	Season 1
HouseBroken	Bento Box Entertainment	2023	Season 2
House of Mouse	Walt Disney Television Animation	2001–2003	
Jake and the Never Land Pirates	Disney Television Animation	2015–2016	Season 4
Jungle Cubs	Walt Disney Television Animation	1996	Season 1
Kim Possible	Walt Disney Television Animation	2002–2003	Season 1
Krapopolis	Fox Entertainment Studios; Bento Box Entertainment	2023	"All Hail the Goddess of Likability!"
The Land Before Time	Universal Animation Studios; Amblin Entertainment	2007–2008	
The Last Kids on Earth	Atomic Cartoons	2020	Additional animation for Book 2
Lazor Wulf	6 Point Harness	2020–2021	Season 2, as Morph Animation
The Legend of Tarzan	Walt Disney Television Animation	2001–2003	
Lil Kev	Standing Room Only! Productions; King of France Productions; ShadowMachine; HartBeat Productions	2025–present	
Lilo & Stitch: The Series	Walt Disney Television Animation	2003–2006	
The Looney Tunes Show	Warner Bros. Animation	2011	Season 1
Lupin's Tales	Xilam	2021–present	
Mickey Mouse Works	Walt Disney Television Animation	1999–2000	
The Mighty B!	Nickelodeon Animation Studio; Paper Kite Productions; Polka Dot Pictures	2008	Season 1
Mighty Ducks: The Animated Series	Walt Disney Television Animation	1996	
Mixed Nutz	Big Bad Boo	2008	
Moka's Fabulous Adventures!	Xilam	2020	
Molly of Denali	CBC Kids; GBH Kids (Note: Credited as WGBH Kids for earlier season 1 episodes.)	2019–present	
Mother Up!	Broadway Video; Mass Animation; Bardel Entertainment; Rogers Media	2013–2014	As Morph Animation
Mr. Magoo	Xilam	2019–2023	
Oggy and the Cockroaches	Xilam	2017–2019	Seasons 5–7, as Morph Animation
Quack Pack	Walt Disney Television Animation	1996	
Recess	Walt Disney Television Animation	1999–2001	Seasons 2–3; 8 episodes, 10 segments
The Replacements	Walt Disney Television Animation	2006–2007	Season 1
Rick and Morty	Williams Street	2013–2015	Seasons 1–2, as Morph Animation
Rise of the Teenage Mutant Ninja Turtles	Flying Bark Productions	2019–2020	Additional animation for season 2
Star Stable: Mistfall	Ferly	2021	As Morph Animation
Star vs. the Forces of Evil	Disney Television Animation	2015	Season 1
Sun Chaser	Playlab Animation	2026	
Taffy	Cyber Group Studios	2018–2024	As Morph Animation
Teacher's Pet	Walt Disney Television Animation	2000–2002	
Teamo Supremo	Walt Disney Television Animation	2002–2004	
Timon & Pumbaa	Walt Disney Television Animation	1995–1996	Seasons 1–2
Tom and Jerry Tales	Warner Bros. Animation; Turner Entertainment Co. Warner Bros. Family Entertainment	2006–2008	
Wabbit: A Looney Tunes Production	Warner Bros. Animation	2014	Pilot version of "To Catch a Fairy"
Voltron Force	World Events Productions; Classic Media; Kickstart Productions; Nicktoons	2011–2012	
Zeroman	Amberwood Entertainment	2004	
The ZhuZhus	Nelvana	2016–2017	Additional animation
Zig & Sharko	Xilam	2019–2024	Seasons 3–4
Wolfboy and the Everything Factory	Bento Box Entertainment	2022	Season 2

=== Feature films ===
- Kleines Arschloch (1997, TFC Trickompany Filmproduktion GmbH)
- The Jungle Book 2 (2003, DisneyToon Studios)
- Teacher's Pet (2004, Walt Disney Television Animation)
- Curious George (2006, Universal Animation Studios) (Digital Ink and Paint only)
- The Three Robbers (2007, Animation X Gesellschaft zur Produktion von Animationsfilmen mbH)
- WinneToons (2007)
- Santa's Apprentice (2010, Cartoon Salon)
- Titeuf, le film (2011, MoonScoop Productions)
- The Golden Horse (2014, Acme Film)
- Henry and Me (2014, Sunset Studios)
- Der kleine Rabe Socke - Das große Rennen (2015, Seru Films)
- La Leyenda del Chupacabras (2016, Ánima Estudios)
- Fritzi – A Revolutionary Tale (2019, Trick Studios)
- Little Vampire (2019, The Magical Society)
- Koati (2021, Upstairs Animation, Los Hijos de Jack, and Latin We)

=== Direct-to-video films ===
- Belle's Magical World (1998, Walt Disney Television Animation)
- The Lion King II: Simba's Pride (1998, Walt Disney Television Animation)
- Hercules: Zero to Hero (1999, Walt Disney Television Animation)
- Mickey's Once Upon a Christmas (1999, Walt Disney Television Animation)
- Mickey's Magical Christmas: Snowed in at the House of Mouse (2001, Walt Disney Television Animation)
- Tarzan & Jane (2002, Walt Disney Television Animation)
- Mickey's House of Villains (2002, Walt Disney Television Animation)
- Atlantis: Milo's Return (2003, Walt Disney Television Animation)
- Winnie the Pooh: Springtime with Roo (2004, DisneyToon Studios)
- Bratz: Starrin' & Stylin' (2004, MGA Entertainment)
- Mickey, Donald, Goofy: The Three Musketeers (2004, DisneyToon Studios)
- Babak & Friends (2005, Norooz Productions)
- Tom and Jerry: Blast Off to Mars (2005, Warner Bros. Animation)
- Tarzan II (2005, DisneyToon Studios)
- Pooh's Heffalump Halloween Movie (2005, DisneyToon Studios)
- Kronk's New Groove (2005, DisneyToon Studios)
- Bah, Humduck! A Looney Tunes Christmas (2006, Warner Bros. Animation)
- The Fox and the Hound 2 (2006, DisneyToon Studios)
- Cinderella III: A Twist in Time (2007, DisneyToon Studios)
- Disney Princess Enchanted Tales: Follow Your Dreams (2007, DisneyToon Studios)
- The Little Mermaid: Ariel's Beginning (2008, DisneyToon Studios)
- Holly Hobbie and Friends: Fabulous Fashion Show (2008, Sony Wonder)
- Holly Hobbie and Friends: Marvelous Makeover (2009, Sony Wonder)
- Curious George 2: Follow That Monkey! (2009, Universal Animation Studios)

=== Television specials ===
- Boo to You Too! Winnie the Pooh (1996, Walt Disney Television Animation)
- The Last Sheep (2019, Trick Studios)

=== Online series ===
- Helluva Boss (2023–present, SpindleHorse Toons)
- Gameoverse (2026, Glitch Productions) (credited as "Toon City Vancouver")

=== Shorts ===
- Plastic Man (2006, Warner Bros. Animation)
