= Tigger =

Winnie-the-Pooh character

- Winnie-the-Pooh character
- Tigger meets Pooh. Original E. H. Shepard illustration, coloured, of Pooh meeting Tigger outside his front door in The House at Pooh Corner.
- First appearance: The House at Pooh Corner (1928)
- Created by: A. A. Milne

In-universe information
- Species: Tiger toy
- Gender: Male

Tigger is a fictional character in A. A. Milne's Winnie-the-Pooh books and their adaptations. An anthropomorphic toy tiger, he was originally introduced in the 1928-story collection The House at Pooh Corner, the sequel to the 1926 book Winnie-the-Pooh. Like other Pooh characters, Tigger is based on one of Christopher Robin Milne's stuffed toy animals. He appears in the Disney animated versions of Winnie the Pooh and has also appeared in his own film, The Tigger Movie (2000).

He is known for his distinctive orange colour with black stripes, large eyes, a long chin, a springy tail, and his love of bouncing. As he says himself, "Bouncing is what Tiggers do best." Tigger never refers to himself as a tiger, but as a "Tigger". Although he often refers to himself in the third person plural (e.g. "Tiggers don't like honey!"), he maintains that he is "the only one".

== In literature ==
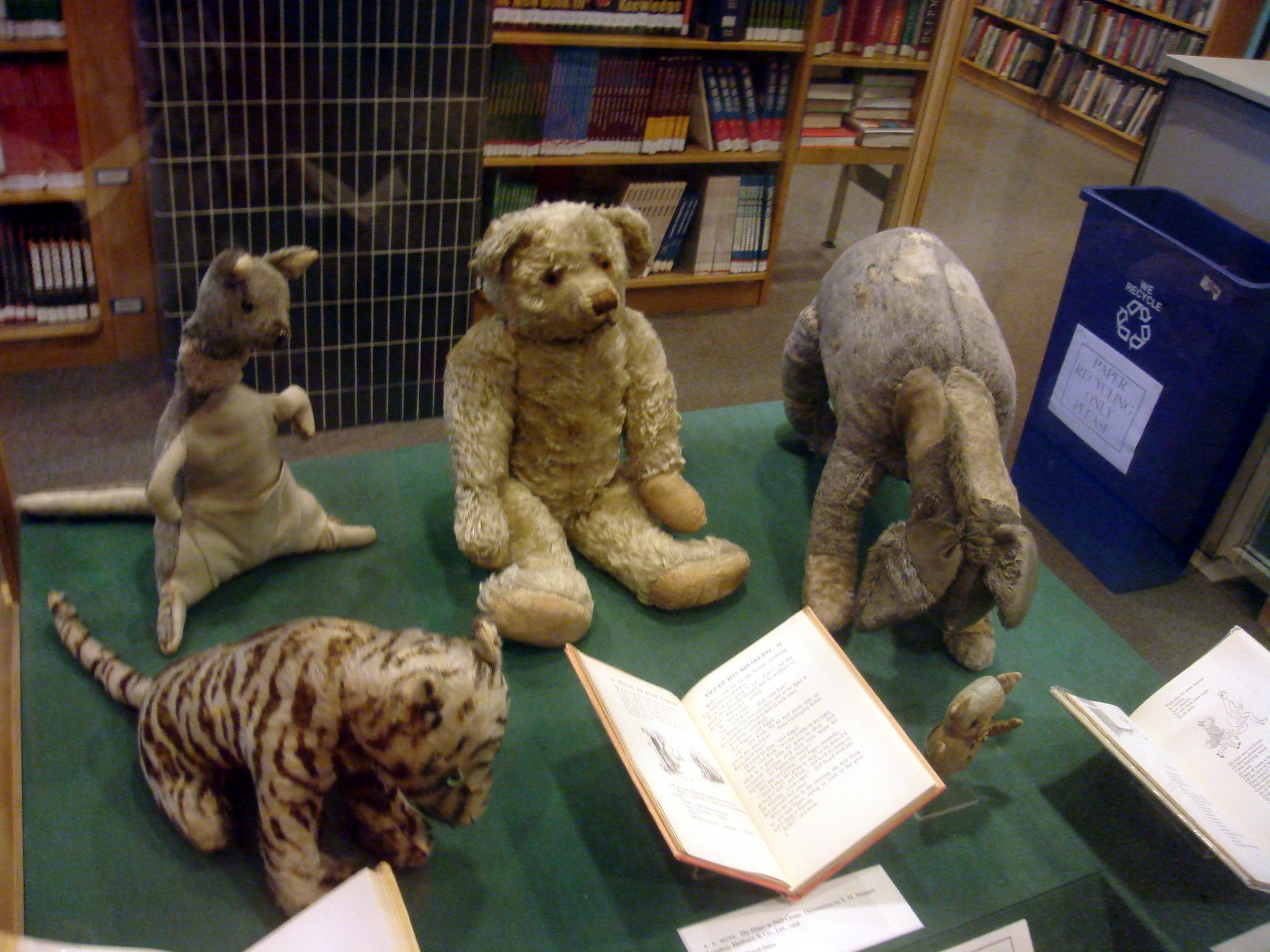
The real stuffed toys owned by Christopher Robin and featured in the Winnie-the-Pooh stories. Clockwise from bottom left: Tigger, Kanga, Edward Bear (a.k.a. Winnie-the-Pooh), Eeyore, and Piglet. They were on display in the Donnell Library Center in New York City, until it closed in 2008, when they were relocated to the Children's Room in the Main Branch.

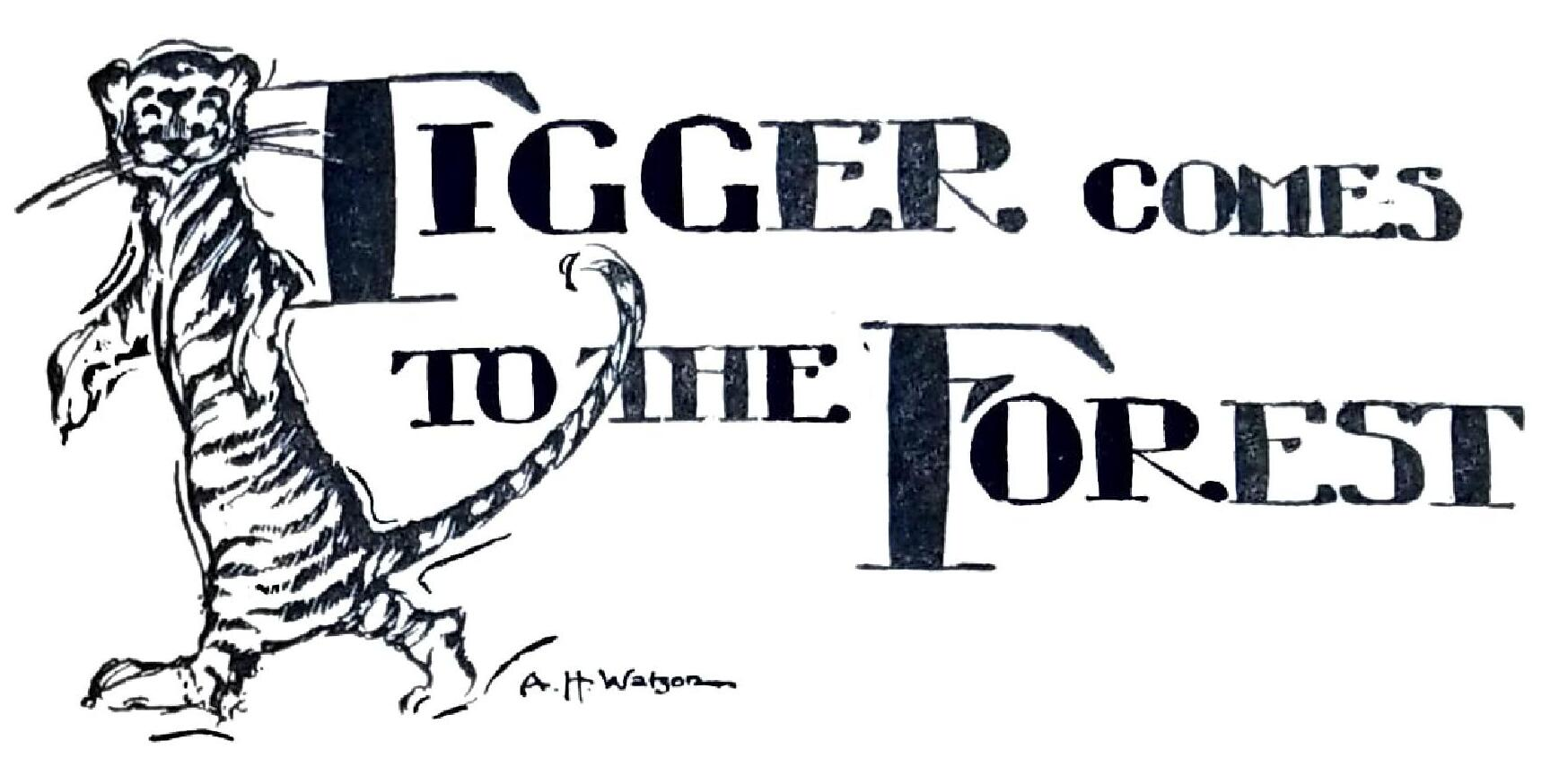
Illustration of Tigger in a 1927 book, Sails of Gold

Tigger is introduced in Chapter II of House at Pooh Corner, when he arrives at Winnie-the-Pooh's doorstep in the middle of the night, announcing himself with a stylised roar. Most of the rest of that chapter is taken up with the characters' search for a food that Tigger can eat for breakfast — despite Tigger's claims to like "everything", it is quickly proven that he does not like honey, acorns, thistles, or most of the contents of Kanga's larder. In a happy coincidence, however, he discovers that Tiggers like an extract of malt, which Kanga has on hand because she gives it to her baby, Roo, as "strengthening medicine".

Subsequently, Tigger resides with Kanga and Roo in their house in the part of the Hundred Acre Wood near the Sandy Pit. He becomes great friends with Roo (to whom he becomes a sort of older sibling figure), and Kanga treats him in much the same way she does her own son. Tigger also interacts enthusiastically with all the other characters — sometimes too enthusiastically for the likes of Rabbit, who is sometimes exasperated by Tigger's constant bouncing, Eeyore, who is once bounced into the river by Tigger, and Piglet, who always seems a little nervous about the new, large, bouncy animal in the Forest. Nonetheless, the animals are all shown to be friends.

In addition to chapter II, Tigger also appears in Chapters IV, VI, VII, IX, and X of The House at Pooh Corner, and is mentioned and seen in Chapter V. He is the only new major character to be introduced in The House at Pooh Corner; all of the others had been established in the earlier book, Winnie-the-Pooh.

=== Depiction and personality traits ===
In Ernest H. Shepard's illustrations, Tigger appears to bounce and he is capable of holding a pen with one of his front paws. Though Tigger is described by Rabbit and Piglet as "large", he does not seem particularly big in the illustrations. Pooh states once "He always seems bigger because of his bounces", implying that the other animals think of Tigger as being larger than he truly is. That assessment fits very well with Tigger's personality and his assessment of his own abilities, which he always overestimates. He is cheerful, outgoing, competitive in a friendly way, and has complete confidence in himself. Some of the things which he claims Tiggers can do in the chapter "In which it is shown That Tiggers don't climb trees" include flying, jumping farther than a kangaroo, swimming, and climbing trees. He never actually attempts any of the first three things in the course of the story, but he does try to climb a tree. He only succeeds half-way, being able to climb up but not to climb down again. Tigger also says Tiggers "never get lost"; unlike most of his other claims, this one seems to be true - he is able to find his way through the Forest even in a thick mist, despite Rabbit's attempts to lose him.

Like most of the characters in Winnie-the-Pooh, Tigger was based on one of Christopher Robin Milne's stuffed animals, in this case a stuffed-toy tiger. However, the word "tiger" is never actually used in the book. The term "Tigger" is used instead, both as the character's name and as a description of his type of animal. No other "Tiggers" appear in the story, and at one point Tigger (who has just seen his reflection in a mirror and mistaken it for another individual) comments he thought he was the only one. Despite that belief, he constantly uses the term in the plural, as in "Tiggers don't like honey." and "So that's what Tiggers like!", etc. The term is always capitalized.

== Adaptations ==
In 1960, His Master's Voice recorded a dramatised version with songs (music by Harold Fraser-Simson) of two episodes from The House at Pooh Corner (Chapters 2 and 8), with Hugh Lloyd as Tigger, which was released on a 45 rpm EP.

== Disney adaptations ==
Tigger
- Disney's Winnie the Pooh character
- Tigger, as he appears in The Tigger Movie
- First appearance: Winnie the Pooh and the Blustery Day (1968)
- Created by: A. A. Milne
- Voiced by: Paul Winchell (1968–1999); Sam Edwards (record release); Will Ryan (Welcome to Pooh Corner); Jim Cummings (1989–present); Ed Gilbert (Read-Along books); Marc Silk (Bounce Bounce Tigger); Gracen Newton (Playdate with Winnie the Pooh)

In-universe information
- Species: Tiger (or "tigger")
- Gender: Male

Tigger appears in the Disney cartoon versions of the Winnie the Pooh stories, beginning with Winnie the Pooh and the Blustery Day in 1968. He starred in his own film, The Tigger Movie (Disney, 2000), along with his friends from the Hundred Acre Wood.

From 1968 to 1999, Tigger was voiced by Paul Winchell. However, Walt Disney initially planned to have the character voiced by Wally Boag, but the role was turned over to Winchell after Disney's death, since Boag's performance of the character was considered to be "too zany for a children's film". Sam Edwards voiced Tigger in a couple of albums for Disneyland Records before Winnie the Pooh and the Blustery Day was released. Will Ryan voiced Tigger only in the Disney Channel program Welcome to Pooh Corner, which ran from 1983 to 1986. Later, Jim Cummings (who is also the new voice of Pooh) provided Tigger's voice, starting with later seasons of The New Adventures of Winnie the Pooh. For a while, Cummings shared the role with Winchell, with the latter providing Tigger's speaking voice while the former sang as the character, until he took the role full-time starting with the 2000 film The Tigger Movie.

Since 1989, Tigger has been voiced by Jim Cummings (also the voice of Winnie the Pooh), with the exceptions of What's the Score, Pooh? (1990), Eeyi Eeyi Eeyore (1990), Pooh's Grand Adventure: The Search for Christopher Robin (1997), A Winnie the Pooh Thanksgiving (1998), Winnie the Pooh: A Valentine for You (1999), archive footage of Winnie the Pooh: Seasons of Giving (1999), and The Many Adventures of Winnie the Pooh attraction at Walt Disney World, in which Winchell reprised the role of Tigger (Cummings voiced Tigger in the Disneyland version). On some albums and read-along cassettes in the early '90s, Ed Gilbert voiced Tigger.

In the movies, Tigger sings his own theme song, "The Wonderful Thing About Tiggers", written by the Sherman Brothers and first sung in Winnie the Pooh and the Blustery Day. The song is repeated in Disney's 1974 release Winnie the Pooh and Tigger Too!, The Many Adventures of Winnie the Pooh ride and then again in the 1977 release The Many Adventures of Winnie the Pooh. In 1974, Paul Winchell earned a Grammy for his rendition of the song. The music was composed by Richard M. Sherman, with the lyrics and idea by Robert B. Sherman. Performed by Sam Edwards on record albums and Paul Winchell in The Many Adventures of Winnie the Pooh and later Jim Cummings in The Tigger Movie, Piglet's Big Movie, the 2011 film Winnie the Pooh, and the 2018 live-action film Christopher Robin. According to the song, Tigger is "the only one", which leads to his search for his family in The Tigger Movie. The song opens up that film's first release.

In The New Adventures of Winnie the Pooh and subsequent cartoons, Tigger lives in a large treehouse. A tire swing hangs prominently from a branch of the tree. In The Tigger Movie, Tigger builds a makeshift addition (gluing the shingles on with bubble gum, using honey as brick mortar) in anticipation of a hoped-for visit by members of his family. This "family room" is eventually relocated to serve as a replacement for Eeyore's collapse-prone house of sticks.

The Disney version of Tigger appeared in both the TV special Cartoon All-Stars to the Rescue and the TV series House of Mouse. Tigger also made recurring appearances in the live-action wrap-around skits television series The Mouse Factory, alongside the other costumed characters and celebrity guests.

=== Personality traits ===
Tigger's personality in the cartoons is much like his personality in the book. He is always filled with great energy and optimism, and though always well-meaning, he can also be mischievous, and his actions have sometimes led to chaos and trouble for himself and his friends. He is very confident and possesses high self-esteem to the point of egotism. Also, he often undertakes tasks with gusto, only to later realize they were not as easy as he had originally imagined. As in the books, Tigger never refers to himself as a tiger, but as a "Tigger". When Tigger introduces himself, he often says the proper way to spell his name and that is "T-I-double-Guh-Er", which spells "Tigger".

Tigger's language is full of malapropisms, mispronunciations, or unnecessary/incorrect emphasis on syllables. Examples of this include him pronouncing "villain" as "villian"; "terrible" as "terribibble"; "regulations" as "regularations"; "ridiculous" as "ridickerous" (or "ricky-diculus" in Winnie the Pooh and the Blustery Day); "allergic" as "allergical"; "recognize" as "recoganize"; "suspicious" as "suspicerous"; "Eureka" as "Topeka".

A declaration often made, is that "Tiggers are wonderful things. Their tops are made out of rubber, their bottoms are made out of springs." In cartoon, he's often depicted bouncing around in ways which would make such a statement appear to be valid.

In The New Adventures of Winnie the Pooh, Tigger is often well-meaning but usually does more harm than good. In the episode "Tigger is the Mother of Invention", he invented a bulldozer-like contraption intended to provide convenience for Pooh, Piglet, and Rabbit, but the invention proved to have disastrous results, and Rabbit insisted that Tigger shut it down; however, in the winter, a depressed Tigger accidentally started the machine up, and it proved to be useful by plowing snow around Piglet's house before malfunctioning. On another occasion, Tigger attempted to mimic a superhero, "The Masked Offender", bringing mayhem to the Hundred-Acre Wood. In response, Pooh, Rabbit, Gopher, and Owl (unaware that the Masked Offender was actually Tigger) staged a hoax in which they made an inanimate monster from a sticky glue-like material. The plan worked, revealing Tigger as the Masked Offender, but the fake monster (which was on wheels) turned on its makers, ultimately resulting in Pooh, Rabbit, Gopher, and Owl hanging by the glue from a rickety bridge. Subsequently, Tigger resumed his role as the Masked Offender, and saved his friends.

It's also shown that Tigger will jump in to help without thinking about the danger to himself. On at least three occasions, he has nearly fallen off a cliff, and has fallen two of those times, to retrieve something important (Half of the map in Pooh's Grand Adventure: The Search for Christopher Robin, his locket in The Tigger Movie, and a page of Piglet's scrapbook in Piglet's Big Movie).

Tigger's birthday is believed to be in October 1928, the year The House at Pooh Corner was first published. However, on Tigger-related merchandise, Disney often indicates Tigger's birthyear is in December 1968, a reference to the first appearance of Tigger in a Disney production, Winnie the Pooh and the Blustery Day.

Disney's Tigger is also remembered for his song "The Wonderful Thing About Tiggers" when he made his first appearance. However, he wasn't included in the "Winnie the Pooh" theme song until the 2011 film.

== Screen media appearances ==
=== Disney version ===
==== Short films and featurettes ====
- Winnie the Pooh and the Blustery Day (1968) – Paul Winchell
- Winnie the Pooh and Tigger Too (1974) – Paul Winchell
- Winnie the Pooh and a Day for Eeyore (1983) – Paul Winchell
- Once Upon a Studio (2023)

==== Feature-length films ====
- The Many Adventures of Winnie the Pooh (1977)
  - Winnie the Pooh and the Blustery Day (1968) – Paul Winchell
  - Winnie the Pooh and Tigger Too (1974) – Paul Winchell
- Pooh's Grand Adventure: The Search for Christopher Robin (1997) – Paul Winchell and Jim Cummings (singing voice)
- Seasons of Giving (1999; direct-to-video) – Jim Cummings (new footage) and Paul Winchell (archival footage)
- The Tigger Movie (2000) – Jim Cummings
- The Book of Pooh: Stories from the Heart (2001; direct-to-video)
- A Very Merry Pooh Year (2002; direct-to-video) – Jim Cummings
- Mickey's Magical Christmas: Snowed in at the House of Mouse (2001; direct-to-video) – Jim Cummings
- Mickey's House of Villains (2002; direct-to-video) – Jim Cummings
- Piglet's Big Movie (2003) – Jim Cummings
- Springtime with Roo (2004; direct-to-video) – Jim Cummings
- Pooh's Heffalump Movie (2005) – Jim Cummings
- Pooh's Heffalump Halloween Movie (2005; direct-to-video) – Jim Cummings
- Super Sleuth Christmas Movie (2007; direct-to-video) – Jim Cummings
- Tigger & Pooh and a Musical Too (2009; direct-to-video) – Jim Cummings
- Super Duper Super Sleuths (2010; direct-to-video) – Jim Cummings
- Winnie the Pooh (2011) – Jim Cummings
- Christopher Robin (2018) – Jim Cummings (originally by Chris O'Dowd)
- Chip 'n Dale: Rescue Rangers (2022) - Jim Cummings (bootleg version)

==== Television series ====
- The Mouse Factory (1972–1974, as recurring guest) – Paul Winchell
- Welcome to Pooh Corner (1983–1986) – Will Ryan
- The New Adventures of Winnie the Pooh (1988–1991) – Paul Winchell (1988–1990; 1991) and Jim Cummings (1989; 1990–1991)
- House of Mouse (2001–2003, cameo appearances)
- The Book of Pooh (2001–2003) – Jim Cummings
- My Friends Tigger & Pooh (2007–2010) – Jim Cummings
- Doc McStuffins (episode "Into the Hundred Acre Wood!", 2017) – Jim Cummings
- The Wonderful World of Mickey Mouse (episode "The Wonderful Spring of Mickey Mouse", 2022, cameo appearance)
- Playdate with Winnie the Pooh (2023–present) – Gracen Newton

==== Video games ====
- Tigger's Honey Hunt (2000)

=== Other appearances ===
- Shirley Temple's Storybook (episode "Winnie-the-Pooh", 1960) – Carl Harms
- Winnie-the-Pooh: Blood and Honey 2 (2024)

== In popular culture ==
- Tigger appears in four segments of the Cartoon Network show MAD: "Pooh Grit", "Fast Hive", "Adjustment Burro", and "Frankenwinnie", voiced by Fred Tatasciore in "Pooh Grit" and Kevin Shinick in all other appearances.
- In the Aladdin episode "As the Netherworld Turns", the Genie briefly turns into Tigger.
- In Randy Pausch's The Last Lecture: Really Achieving Your Childhood Dreams, he asks whether one should live their life as a Tigger or as an Eeyore. Pausch indicated that he was a "Tigger".
