= Kronk's New Groove =

2005 animated Disney film

- DVD cover
- Directed by: Elliot M. Bour; Saul Andrew Blinkoff
- Screenplay by: Tom Rogers
- Story by: Tony Leondis; Michael LaBash; Tom Rogers
- Produced by: Prudence Fenton; John A. Smith
- Starring: Patrick Warburton; Tracey Ullman; Eartha Kitt; John Goodman; Wendie Malick; John Mahoney; John Fiedler; David Spade
- Narrated by: David Spade
- Edited by: Philip Malamuth; Arthur D. Noda
- Music by: Mark Watters (score); Jeanine Tesori (songs)
- Production company: Disneytoon Studios (Note: Animation outsourced to Toon City Animation.)
- Distributed by: Buena Vista Home Entertainment (Note: Distributed by Walt Disney Home Entertainment through the Walt Disney Pictures banner.)
- Release date: December 13, 2005
- Running time: 75 minutes
- Countries: United States; Philippines (Note: produced by Toon City Animation)
- Language: English

Kronk's New Groove (also known as The Emperor's New Groove 2: Kronk's New Groove) is a 2005 American animated direct-to-video musical comedy film produced by Walt Disney Pictures and Disneytoon Studios. It is the sequel and spin-off to The Emperor's New Groove (2000), with David Spade, John Goodman, Eartha Kitt, Patrick Warburton and Wendie Malick returning from the first film, with John Mahoney and Tracey Ullman joining the voice cast.

The film was directed by Elliot M. Bour and Saul Andrew Blinkoff and released by Walt Disney Home Entertainment on December 13, 2005. It was also the last film to feature the voice of John Fiedler, who died six months before it was released. An animated television series, The Emperor's New School, aired on the Disney Channel from 2006 to 2008.

== Plot ==
Emperor Kuzco (David Spade) narrates the story about Kronk (Patrick Warburton), now chef and Head Delivery Boy of Mudka's Meat Hut, who is fretting over the upcoming visit of his father. Kronk's father always disapproved of young Kronk's culinary interests and wished that Kronk instead would settle down with a wife and a large house on a hill.

In a flashback, Kronk tells the story of how he almost had both of these. As unwitting accomplice to Yzma (Eartha Kitt) – the villainess of the first film who turned into a cat at the end of the original, but is now human again despite still having a tail – he goes along with her plan to sell sewer slime as a youth potion. He makes enough money to buy the old folks' home from the old folks and put his large new home there. Eventually, Yzma is revealed as a fake and the old folks chase her down and corner her at a bridge over a river full of crocodiles. To prevent them from attacking her, she transforms herself into a rabbit, but is then caught and taken away by a condor. When Kronk realizes the old folks have sold everything they own in return for something which doesn't work, he gives his home back to them.

Kronk, as camp counselor of the Junior Chipmunks at Camp Chippamunka, falls in love with fellow counselor Miss Birdwell (Tracey Ullman); but when one of his Chipmunks, Tipo, pulls a prank to win the camp championships and is caught, Kronk, feeling responsible for the situation (due to having previously told his Chipmunks to do whatever it took to win), protects the boy at the cost of alienating his love.

Kronk's father (John Mahoney) arrives and confusion ensues as several supportive friends try to pass themselves off to him as Kronk's wife and kids. But in the end, Kronk realizes that his wealth is in his friendships, and this finally wins his father's thumbs up and Miss Birdwell's love.

Meanwhile, just outside the house, Yzma is in the condor's nest with two eggs, which hatch and presumably attack her before the end credits roll.

== Voice cast ==
- Patrick Warburton as Kronk
- Tracey Ullman as Miss Birdwell
- Eartha Kitt as Yzma
- David Spade as Kuzco
- John Goodman as Pacha
- Wendie Malick as Chicha
- John Mahoney as Papi
- John Fiedler as Rudy (final film role)
- Bob Bergen as Bucky
- Eli Russell Linnetz as Tipo
- Patti Deutsch as Waitress
- Michaela Jill Murphy as Chaca
- Anthony Ghannam as Huayna
- Jeff Bennett as Skinny Old Man / Stout Old Man / Gollum-Rudy
- April Winchell as Hildy / Marge / Tina

== Production ==
The film was produced by Disneytoon Studios, and Toon City, a start up animation company founded by former Disney Feature Animation Florida employees.

== Reception ==
The film holds a 0% approval rating on Rotten Tomatoes based on 7 reviews and an average rating of 4.5/10. Pam Gelman of Common Sense Media gave the film two out of five stars, stating that the film's story "is disjointed with unnecessary attempts at humor that are clearly geared for parents". David Nusair of Reel Film Reviews states the main character "works best in small doses; forced to carry an entire movie, Kronk becomes tedious and (unbelievable as it seems) unfunny."

A meme came out of the film in 2026 due to a scene where Kronk and Miss Birdwell dance together. Various animators on YouTube have taken to recreating the scene using their own characters.

== Annie Awards ==
The film was nominated in 2006 for the following Annie Awards:

- Best Home Entertainment Production
- Best Storyboarding in an Animated Feature Production
- Best Writing in an Animated Feature Production

== Home media ==
The film was released on direct-to-DVD and direct-to-VHS on December 13, 2005.{{

== Songs ==
All tracks are written by Mark Watters and Jeanine Tesori.

No.	Title	Performer(s)	Length
1.	"Let's Groove"	Earth, Wind & Fire & B5
2.	"Be True To Your Groove"	Sandy Barber & Peter Lurye
3.	"Feel Like a Million"	Eartha Kitt
4.	"Camp Chippamunka"	Nicholas Harper, Eli Russell Linnetz, Zoe Merrill, Madison Moore, Aaron Page & Bobbi Page (Camp Chippamunka Scouts)
