= Pooh's Heffalump Halloween Movie =

2005 animated Disney film by Elliot M. Bour and Saul Andrew Blinkoff

- DVD cover
- Directed by: Elliot M. Bour; Saul Andrew Blinkoff
- Written by: Evan Spiliotopoulos; Brian Hohlfeld
- Based on: Characters created by A. A. Milne
- Produced by: John A. Smith
- Starring: Jimmy Bennett; Kyle Stanger; Jim Cummings; John Fiedler; Peter Cullen; Ken Sansom; Kath Soucie
- Narrated by: David Ogden Stiers
- Edited by: Art Noda
- Music by: Mark Watters
- Production companies: Disneytoon Studios (Note: Animation outsourced to Toon City Animation and Project Firefly.); Toon City Animation
- Distributed by: Walt Disney Home Entertainment (Note: Released through the Walt Disney Pictures banner.)
- Release date: September 13, 2005
- Running time: 67 minutes
- Country: United States
- Language: English

Pooh's Heffalump Halloween Movie is a 2005 American animated direct-to-video Halloween comedy film produced by Disneytoon Studios and released by Walt Disney Pictures, featuring the characters from Disney's Winnie the Pooh franchise, based on the original characters from the books by A. A. Milne. The sequel to Pooh's Heffalump Movie, this was the final Winnie the Pooh film to be produced by Disneytoon Studios. This release incorporates the short film Boo to You Too! Winnie the Pooh into the storyline. In the film, on their first Halloween together with his friends, Roo and Lumpy gather the courage to search for the Gobloon, a creature that can turn victims into Jack-O-Lanterns, but grant wishes if capture.

The film marked voice actor John Fiedler's final appearance as Piglet, as he died before completing his voice work (two and a half months shorty before the film's release). Upon Fiedler's death, Travis Oates was brought in to finish the remaining scenes (and received credit for "additional voices") and became Piglet's new official voice actor. It was followed in the Winnie the Pooh animated film series by a television film, Pooh's Super Sleuth Christmas Movie, in 2007, based on the animated television series, My Friends Tigger & Pooh.

== Plot ==
It is Lumpy's first Halloween with Winnie the Pooh, Roo, and their friends in the Hundred Acre Wood. The group discusses their plans for Halloween and for their first night of trick-or-treating. Tigger tells his friends about the dreaded Gobloon, a monster that comes out every Halloween to search for somebody to catch and will turn them into "jaggedy lanterns" if he catches them, but if the Gobloon is captured first, it will grant its captors one wish; Rabbit does not believe such a creature exists.

After Pooh accidentally eats all of the trick-or-treat candy that Rabbit collected from the Hundred Acre Wood, Roo and Lumpy set out to capture the Gobloon to wish for more. According to Tigger's directions on the map, they are able to go past the Creepy Cave then down the Slimy Slide and into the Tree of Terror later on. Entering the Creepy Cave, Lumpy and his lunchbox get stuck on some rocks, which leads Lumpy to believe that they are being followed. He desperately wants to go back, but Roo insists that they should press on, and eventually they find the Slimy Slide, and then the Tree of Terror.

When Roo and Lumpy reach the supposed Gobloon's lair, Lumpy loses his courage to catch the Gobloon and wants to go home. So, Roo tells him the story from Boo to You Too! Winnie the Pooh, when Piglet was afraid to go trick-or-treating but gained his courage. An inspired Lumpy helps Roo set a trap for the Gobloon, but the two hear a sound coming from an old bridge and go to investigate.

After encountering and fleeing from a mysterious figure, whom they think is the Gobloon, with a wheelbarrow of Jack-o'-lanterns, Lumpy gets separated from Roo and ends up stuck in the trap they had set for the Gobloon. Lumpy is heartbroken to be alone, as he and Roo had promised to stay together during the adventure. Roo finds a Jack-o'-lantern resembling Lumpy, which makes him think his friend has been caught by the Gobloon and turned into a "jaggedy lantern".

Once back with the others, Roo recruits Winnie the Pooh, Piglet, Tigger, Eeyore, and Rabbit, who were using vegetables after Pooh ate all the candy to help him capture the Gobloon and save Lumpy. The group arrives at the trap and believes the Gobloon is trapped, unaware that it is actually Lumpy. Roo wishes to have his friend Lumpy back, but becomes bitterly saddened when the "Gobloon" does not grant his wish. Hearing Roo's voice, Lumpy calls for him, but a loud thunder blocks it, prompting him to break his way out of the trap. Roo and Lumpy are happily reunited.

The group finally goes trick-or-treating and Kanga, who was the mysterious figure from earlier, throws a Halloween party for the friends and gives them candy, complete with Jack-o'-lanterns she had carved in everyone's likenesses. As Lumpy's Jack-o'-lantern was not there, Kanga explains she made one, but must have accidentally dropped it, which turns out to be the Jack-o'-lantern that Roo found. With Lumpy's first Halloween being successful, everyone from the Hundred Acre Wood enjoys the Halloween party.

== Voice cast ==
- Jimmy Bennett as Roo
- Kyle Stanger as Lumpy the Heffalump
- Jim Cummings as Winnie the Pooh and Tigger
- John Fiedler as Piglet (final role)
  - Steve Schatzberg as Piglet's singing voice (final singing role)
- Peter Cullen as Eeyore
- Ken Sansom as Rabbit
- Kath Soucie as Kanga
- Michael Gough as Gopher (archive footage)
- David Ogden Stiers as The Narrator

== Production ==
The film was produced by Disneytoon Studios, Toon City and Project Firefly, a start up animation company founded by former Disney Feature Animation Florida employees.

== Reception ==
Cinemagazine rated the film 3 stars.

== Home media ==
The film was released on direct-to-DVD and direct-to-VHS on September 13, 2005. It was later re-released as the Limited Edition with the Pooh Plush Doll on September 1, 2009. The film is a part of Disney Movies Anywhere program.

== Songs ==
All tracks are written by Mark Watters.

No.	Title	Performer(s)	Length
1.	"Trick 'R Treating with Our Friends"	Jim Cummings, Ken Sansom, Peter Cullen, John Fiedler & Jimmy Bennett
2.	"Brave Together"	Jimmy Bennett & Kyle Stanger
3.	"I Am Not Afraid"	Steve Schatzberg
4.	"I Wanna Scare Myself"	Jim Cummings
5.	"Trick 'R Treating with Our Friends (Finale)"	Jim Cummings, Ken Sansom, Peter Cullen, John Fiedler, Jimmy Bennett & Kyle Stanger
6.	"As Long As I'm Here With You"	Joey Lawrence

== See also ==
- List of Halloween films
