= Springtime with Roo =

2004 animated Disney film by Elliot M. Bour and Saul Andrew Blinkoff

Winnie the Pooh: Springtime with Roo
- DVD cover
- Directed by: Elliot M. Bour; Saul Andrew Blinkoff
- Written by: Tom Rogers
- Based on: Winnie-the-Pooh by A. A. Milne and E. H. Shepard A Christmas Carol by Charles Dickens
- Produced by: John A. Smith
- Starring: Jimmy Bennett; Jim Cummings; John Fiedler; Peter Cullen; Ken Sansom; Kath Soucie
- Narrated by: David Ogden Stiers
- Edited by: Robert S. Birchard
- Music by: Mark Watters
- Production companies: Disneytoon Studios (Note: Animation outsourced to Toon City Animation.); Toon City Animation
- Distributed by: Walt Disney Home Entertainment (Note: Released through the Walt Disney Pictures banner.)
- Release date: March 9, 2004
- Running time: 65 minutes
- Country: United States
- Language: English

Springtime with Roo (also known as Winnie the Pooh: Springtime with Roo) is a 2004 American animated direct-to-video Easter musical film produced by Disneytoon Studios for Walt Disney Pictures, and animated by Toon City Animation in Manila, Philippines. In the film, Rabbit declares Easter Day as "Spring Cleaning Day" instead, hurt over when Tigger usurped him as leader of Easter the previous year. The story's Narrator takes Rabbit on a journey through the past, the present and the future, as Rabbit comes to the realisation that his selfishness risks pushing away his own friends.

The film features the characters from Disney's Winnie the Pooh franchise, based on the original characters from the books by A. A. Milne and E. H. Shepard. The story is loosely based on Charles Dickens' 1843 novella A Christmas Carol. Unlike the previous Winnie the Pooh direct-to-video animated films A Very Merry Pooh Year and Seasons of Giving, Springtime with Roo does not reuse any footage or episodes from the animated television series, The New Adventures of Winnie the Pooh.

== Plot ==
On Easter day in the Hundred Acre Wood, Roo and his friends Winnie the Pooh, Piglet, Tigger, and Eeyore visit Rabbit's house, where they expect to celebrate Easter. Upon arrival, the friends discover that Rabbit has replaced the Easter celebration with a Spring Cleaning Day. In Rabbit's absence, the group discover that all of their Easter ornaments had been hidden in Rabbit's closet. Assuming that Rabbit had simply forgotten about Easter, the gang decide to surprise Rabbit by decorating his house with the ornaments, but once Rabbit discovers this, he angrily kicks everyone out of his home for disobeying his orders.

Seeing Roo saddened over the events, Tigger returns to Rabbit's house to try reasoning with him. Still upset with his friends for ruining Spring Cleaning Day, Rabbit insists that Easter will never be celebrated in the Hundred Acre Wood again. Confused as to why Rabbit no longer likes Easter, Tigger and the story's Narrator take Rabbit back through the book to last Easter's celebration, which was sometime after Kanga and Roo had moved to the Hundred Acre Wood.

On that day, Rabbit had insisted on an organized Easter party, but his strict behavior annoyed everyone to the point that Tigger led the group into sneaking away to celebrate Easter without Rabbit while also unintentionally taking away his favourite Easter role: being the Easter Bunny, leaving him feeling left out. Embittered by the past, Rabbit refuses to forgive his friends.

Tigger returns to the present and informs his friends of the reason behind Rabbit's banning of Easter, causing Roo to sympathize with Rabbit, and the others to try brainstorming a way to encourage Rabbit to rejoin the holiday. Meanwhile, Rabbit also returns to the present, but the Narrator purposefully stops on the wrong page, where Rabbit finds Kanga and Roo's house and overhears Roo stating his wish to cheer Rabbit up, though this fails to change his mind.

Exasperated, the Narrator wakes Rabbit that night and transports him to the future of the Hundred Acre Wood, where Rabbit's Spring Cleaning Day celebration has been organised just as he wanted. Yet, Rabbit discovers that all of his friends have moved away when he finds their homes empty and abanonded. When Rabbit questions why they would leave him, the Narrator reminds Rabbit of his previous self-entered outbursts, and now he can truly have things "his way." Realising the consequences of his selfishness, Rabbit tries to fix his mistake by allowing Easter to be celebrated again, only to discover that the Easter supplies are all gone.

Rabbit wakes up the next morning to realize that the events were only a dream and that he still has a chance to change the future. Meanwhile, Roo decides to cheer Rabbit up by repairing his Easter hat, which Rabbit had damaged yesterday in his frustration. While Roo and his friends work on their surprise, Rabbit arrives at Roo's house to cheekily reveal that he has prepared a bigger and better Easter celebration. Also proving that he's willing to adjust to different modes of fun by Roo's example, everyone resumes the festivities and Roo gives Rabbit his Easter hat, thus returning to Rabbit his role as the Easter Bunny.

== Voice cast ==
- Jimmy Bennett as Roo
- Jim Cummings as Winnie the Pooh and Tigger
- John Fiedler as Piglet
  - Jeff Bennett as Piglet's singing voice
- Peter Cullen as Eeyore
- Ken Sansom as Rabbit
- Kath Soucie as Kanga
- David Ogden Stiers as The Narrator

== Production ==
The film was produced by Disneytoon Studios, and its animation was outsourced to Toon City in Manila, Philippines.

== Home media ==
The film was released on direct-to-DVD and direct-to-VHS on March 9, 2004. It included the theatrical trailer for Pooh's Heffalump Movie and two episodes from The New Adventures of Winnie the Pooh ("Honey for a Bunny" and "Trap as Trap Can"). The film was later released on Blu-ray on March 11, 2014 (for the 10th anniversary of the film) as the Hippity-Hoppity Roo edition. The film is a part of Disney Movies Anywhere program.

== Songs ==
All tracks are written by Mark Watters.

No.	Title	Performer(s)	Length
1.	"We're Huntin' Eggs Today"	Jimmy Bennett, Jim Cummings, John Fiedler & Peter Cullen
2.	"Sniffly Sniff"	Jim Cummings
3.	"Easter Day with You"	Jimmy Bennett, Jim Cummings, Jeff Bennett & Peter Cullen
4.	"The Way It Must Be Done"	Ken Sansom & Chorus
5.	"Easter Day with You (Reprise)"	Jimmy Bennett
6.	"The Grandest Easter of Them All"	Ken Sansom
7.	"Easter Day with You (Finale)"	Ken Sansom & Chorus

== See also ==
- Adaptations of A Christmas Carol
- List of Easter films
