= Winnie the Pooh (Disney character) =

Fictional teddy bear created by A. A. Milne

- Disney's Winnie the Pooh character
- First appearance: Winnie the Pooh and the Honey Tree (1966)
- Based on: Winnie The Pooh by; A. A. Milne; E. H. Shepard
- Adapted by: Walt Disney; Eric Larson
- Voiced by: Sterling Holloway (1965–1977); Hal Smith (1977–1986, 1989); Jim Cummings (1988–present); Dan Castellaneta (2021); Leon Chen (Playdate with Winnie the Pooh)

In-universe information
- Nicknames: Pooh Bear; Silly Ol' Bear
- Species: Teddy Bear
- Gender: Male
- Origin: Winnie-the-Pooh by A. A. Milne

Winnie the Pooh (also known as Pooh Bear, or simply Pooh) is a fictional anthropomorphic bear and the main character in Disney's Winnie the Pooh franchise, based on the character Winnie-the-Pooh created by English author A. A. Milne and English artist and book illustrator E. H. Shepard, being one of the most popular characters adapted for film and television by The Walt Disney Company. Disney first received certain licensing rights to the Winnie-the-Pooh stories, characters, and trademarks from Stephen Slesinger, Inc. and the estate of A. A. Milne in 1961. Winnie the Pooh is one of the most popular characters adapted for film and one of Disney's most popular characters, especially in terms of merchandising.

== Adaptation and development by Disney ==
In 1961, Walt Disney Productions licensed certain film and other rights to the Winnie-the-Pooh characters, stories and trademarks from Stephen Slesinger, Inc. and the estate of A. A. Milne. and made a series of animated films about him. These early films were based on several of the original stories and the distinctive artwork made popular by Stephen Slesinger, Inc. during the 1930s through the 1960s. Alongside the animated versions, which Disney adapted from Slesinger, Slesinger's simplified lines and pastel color adaptations of Shepard's original illustrations are now marketed under the description "Classic Pooh".

In 1977, Disney released the animated feature film The Many Adventures of Winnie the Pooh, introducing a new character named Gopher (which Gopher acknowledges by proclaiming, "I'm not in the book, you know"). The film constitutes three stories originally released as separate featurettes: Winnie the Pooh and the Honey Tree (1966), Winnie the Pooh and the Blustery Day (1968), and Winnie the Pooh and Tigger Too (1974). The 1977 release featured new bridging material and a new ending. A fourth featurette, Winnie the Pooh and a Day for Eeyore, was released in 1983.

The live-action TV series Welcome to Pooh Corner ran on the Disney Channel from 1983 to 1986. In 1988, Disney launched an animated TV series The New Adventures of Winnie the Pooh, which aired from 1988 to 1991 with a total of 83 episodes. Pooh appeared with Tigger in the anti-drug animated TV special Cartoon All-Stars to the Rescue.

In 2000, Disney released the feature film The Tigger Movie in which the character of Tigger played the leading role. Due to its success, two more feature-length Pooh movies based on other characters were released to theaters: Piglet's Big Movie in 2003 and Pooh's Heffalump Movie in 2005. Pooh also made appearances in episodes of the animated series House of Mouse, however he doesn't have any speaking lines and is mostly seen in the background.

Disney, along with Shadow Projects produced a puppet TV series for preschoolers, called The Book of Pooh which aired on Playhouse Disney from 2001 to 2003. Disney produced another series for preschoolers, called My Friends Tigger & Pooh, which aired on Playhouse Disney from 2007 to 2010 and done in CGI. Pooh also makes a cameo appearance in the DreamWorks animated film, Bee Movie along with Piglet, at one point, a man spies Pooh and Piglet eating honey and Barry tells him to "take him out" with a tranquilizer dart.

Winnie the Pooh was released in 2011. In April 2015, Deadline reported that Disney would develop a live action Winnie the Pooh movie with Brigham Taylor producing and Alex Ross Perry writing. The film focuses both on Pooh and the adult Christopher Robin returning to the Hundred Acre Woods and his reunion with Pooh and friends. Christopher Robin was released on August 3, 2018 by Walt Disney Studios Motion Pictures in the United States.

=== Casting history ===
Sterling Holloway was the original voice of Pooh, starting with the 1966 theatrical featurette, Winnie the Pooh and the Honey Tree, although the Disneyland Records version was actually released in 1965. Holloway continued to voice the character for over a decade, which included the next two theatrical featurettes, Winnie the Pooh and the Blustery Day (1968) and Winnie the Pooh and Tigger Too (1974), as well as several albums for Disneyland Records. Holloway's last performance as Pooh was for the bridging material in The Many Adventures of Winnie the Pooh (1977).

Hal Smith, who also voiced Owl in the original theatrical featurettes, took over as the voice of Pooh in 1977, starting with the Disney Read-Along adaptation of Winnie the Pooh and Tigger Too. His first performance as Pooh in animation was for the 1981 short, Winnie the Pooh Discovers the Seasons. He would continue to voice Pooh regularly for various projects up until the late 1980s, which included the theatrical featurette Winnie the Pooh and a Day for Eeyore (1983) and the TV series Welcome to Pooh Corner. He briefly reprised the role again in 1989 for the Welcome to Pooh Corner television specials Responsible Persons and One and Only You.

Jim Cummings was chosen to voice the character for the 1988 TV series, The New Adventures of Winnie the Pooh. Cummings has since become the official voice for the character, having voiced him in various TV series, video games, and movies, including the 2018 live-action film, Christopher Robin.

=== Disney Parks ===
Pooh is a common character in the Disney Parks and the most common in the Winnie the Pooh franchise. He is also usually seen with Tigger and Eeyore, and occasionally Piglet, and is mainly located in Fantasyland.

In the Sorcerers of the Magic Kingdom attraction, Pooh has his own spell card known as "Winnie the Pooh's Honey Bees." Pooh also has his own show in Disneyland Paris, called "Winnie the Pooh and Friends, too!." In the same park, Pooh takes part on his own float in Disney Magic on Parade.

In the 2015 rendition of World of Color, Pooh made a cameo appearance during the opening sequence, in honor of Walt Disney.

== Ownership controversy and changes ==
During his lifetime, Milne was liberal with his grant of rights. At times he licensed the same exclusive rights to more than one entity.

In the United States, E. P. Dutton and Company acquired exclusive volume publication rights and Stephen Slesinger, Inc., acquired sole and exclusive rights to virtually all uses outside of the Dutton books as well as rights to any sorts of future uses. Beginning in 1930 Stephen Slesinger created all of the distinctive and colorful images of Pooh outside of the books. Under license from Slesinger, Pooh made his debuts in radio, film, animation, children's theatre, advertising and a host of consumer products and services protected by trademark. Outside of the U.S. and Canada, Milne retained most of his literary copyright rights which he left to four beneficiaries of his trust: The Garrick Club, Westminster School, The Royal Literary Fund and the A. A. Milne Family. By direction of Milne's will, the Pooh Properties Trust was formed. Mrs. Milne, trustee of the Milne Estate, and Spencer Curtis Brown, Trustee, licensed certain exclusive film rights to Disney in 1961. Christopher Robin Milne sold his rights to the other copyright holders, in order to raise money to support his daughter, before his death in 1996.

Sometime around 2000, the Pooh Properties Trust licensed additional rights to Disney and accepted a buyout of their claims to royalties as defined in a 1991 lawsuit brought by Stephen Slesinger, Inc. Although Slesinger's rights are arguably more valuable, the combined value paid by Disney to The Pooh Properties Trust is said to be approximately $300 million for Milne's portion of those rights.

To further minimize Disney's legal exposure to Slesinger, Disney paid money to the Pooh Properties attorneys and trusts to use the name of Clare Milne, daughter of Christopher Robin, in an attempt to terminate certain of the copyright rights of Stephen Slesinger Inc, in the wake of the Sonny Bono Copyright Term Extension Act of 1998. The district court found in favor of Stephen Slesinger, Inc., as did the U.S. Court of Appeals for the Ninth Circuit. On June 26, 2006, the U.S. Supreme Court refused to hear the case, thus sustaining the Appeals Court ruling.

In December 2005, Disney announced that Pooh's friend and owner Christopher Robin would have his best friend Darby, a six-year-old "tomboyish" red-haired girl, take his place for the Disney Channel animated television series, My Friends Tigger & Pooh. Christopher Robin appeared intermittently in the series.

== Awards and honors ==
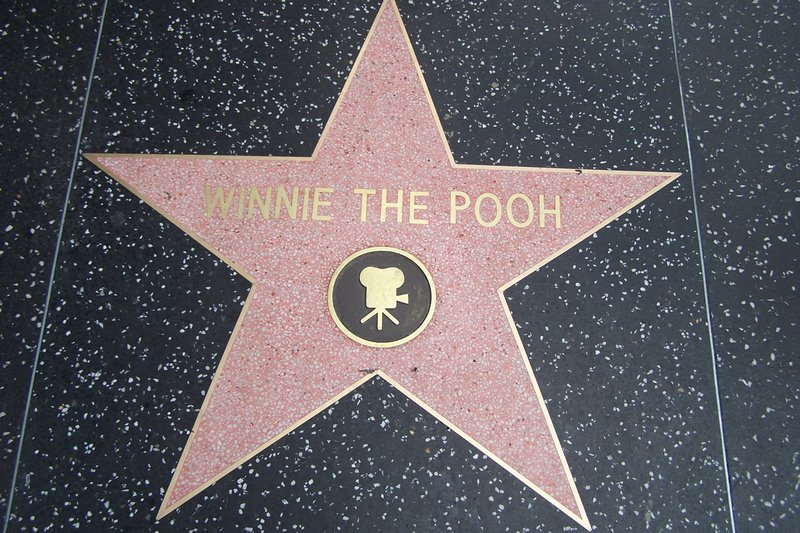
Winnie the Pooh's star on the Hollywood Walk of Fame.

In 2002, TV Guide compiled a list of the 50 greatest cartoon characters of all time as part of the magazine's 50th anniversary. Winnie the Pooh was given the honor of number 27.

On April 11, 2006, Pooh was honored with a star on the Hollywood Walk of Fame, being the fourth Disney character to receive one after Mickey Mouse, Snow White and Donald Duck. The star is located on 6834 Hollywood Blvd.

== Controversies in China ==
Winnie the Pooh has been used in political satire and has created controversies in China since 2013. In that year, critics compared an image of Pooh and his friend Tigger to a picture of Chinese leader Xi Jinping and US president Barack Obama, who met at the G20 in Saint Petersburg, Russia.

Cartoons of Xi as Winnie the Pooh were regarded as disrespectful, but they continued to be used by critics. Dissident Liu Xiaobo and his wife Liu Xia were photographed holding Pooh mugs as an act of protest. Some commentators have speculated that the movie Christopher Robin has been banned in China as a result of these controversies.

== Filmography ==
=== Theatrical shorts ===
- Winnie the Pooh and the Honey Tree (1966) - Sterling Holloway
- Winnie the Pooh and the Blustery Day (1968) - Sterling Holloway
- Winnie the Pooh and Tigger Too (1974) - Sterling Holloway
- Winnie the Pooh Discovers the Seasons (1981) - Hal Smith
- Winnie the Pooh and a Day for Eeyore (1983) - Hal Smith
- Once Upon a Studio (2023) - Sterling Holloway (archive recordings) - Jim Cummings

=== Feature-length films ===
- The Many Adventures of Winnie the Pooh (1977) - Sterling Holloway
- Pooh's Grand Adventure: The Search for Christopher Robin (1997; direct-to-video) - Jim Cummings
- A Valentine for You (1999; direct-to-video) - Jim Cummings
- Seasons of Giving (1999; direct-to-video) - Jim Cummings
- The Tigger Movie (2000) - Jim Cummings
- The Book of Pooh: Stories from the Heart (2001; direct-to-video) - Jim Cummings
- Mickey's Magical Christmas: Snowed in at the House of Mouse (2001; direct-to-video) - Jim Cummings
- Mickey's House of Villains (2002; direct-to-video) - Jim Cummings
- A Very Merry Pooh Year (2002; direct-to-video) - Jim Cummings
- Piglet's Big Movie (2003) - Jim Cummings
- Springtime with Roo (2004; direct-to-video) - Jim Cummings
- Pooh's Heffalump Movie (2005) - Jim Cummings
- Pooh's Heffalump Halloween Movie (2005; direct-to-video) - Jim Cummings
- Winnie the Pooh (2011) - Jim Cummings
- Christopher Robin (2018) - Jim Cummings
- Chip 'n Dale: Rescue Rangers (2022) - Jim Cummings (bootleg version)

=== Television series ===
- Welcome to Pooh Corner (1983–1986) - Hal Smith
- The New Adventures of Winnie the Pooh (1988–1991) - Jim Cummings
- House of Mouse (2001-2003) - Jim Cummings
- The Book of Pooh (2001–2004) - Jim Cummings
- My Friends Tigger & Pooh (2007–2010) - Jim Cummings
- Mini Adventures of Winnie the Pooh (Disney Junior, 2011–2014) - Jim Cummings
- Doc McStuffins (2017) (guest appearance) - Jim Cummings
- Monsters at Work (2021) (brief cameo)
- Playdate with Winnie the Pooh (2023–present) - Leon Chen
- Me & Winnie the Pooh (2023–present) - Leon Chen

=== Television specials ===
- Too Smart for Strangers (1985) - Hal Smith
- Responsible Persons (1989) - Hal Smith
- One and Only You (1989) - Hal Smith
- Winnie the Pooh and Christmas Too (1991) - Jim Cummings
- Boo to You Too! Winnie the Pooh (1996) - Jim Cummings
- A Winnie the Pooh Thanksgiving (1998) - Jim Cummings
- A Valentine for You (1999) - Jim Cummings

==== Direct-to-video shorts ====
- 1990: Winnie the Pooh's ABC of Me - Jim Cummings
- 2021: The Simpsons in Plusaversary - Dan Castellaneta

=== Video games ===
The following games are based on Disney's Winnie the Pooh; Pooh also appears in the Square Enix/Disney crossover series Kingdom Hearts.

Main title / alternate title(s)	Developer	Release date	System(s)
Winnie the Pooh in the Hundred Acre Wood	Sierra On-Line	1984	Amiga, Apple II, Atari ST, Commodore 64, MS-DOS
A Year at Pooh Corner	Novotrade, Sega	1994	Pico
Ready for Math with Pooh	Disney Interactive Studios	1997	Microsoft Windows
Ready to Read with Pooh	Disney Interactive Studios	1997	Microsoft Windows
Winnie the Pooh: Adventures in the 100 Acre Wood	Tose, NewKidCo	2000	Game Boy Color
Tigger's Honey Hunt	Doki Denki, NewKidCo	2000	PlayStation, Windows, Nintendo 64
Disney's Winnie the Pooh: Preschool	Hi Corp, Atlus	2001	PlayStation
Disney's Pooh's Party Game: In Search of the Treasure	Doki Denki, SCEE, Electronic Arts, Tomy Corporation	2001	PlayStation, Windows
Kuma no Pooh-San: Mori no Nakamato 123	Atlus	2001	PlayStation
Pooh and Tigger's Hunny Safari	Digital Eclipse, Electronic Arts, Ubisoft	2001	Game Boy Color
Disney's Winnie the Pooh's Rumbly Tumbly Adventure	Hi Corp, Atlus	2002	PlayStation
Piglet's Big Game	Doki Denki Studio, Disney Interactive Studios, THQ, Gotham Games	2003	GameCube, PlayStation 2, Game Boy Advance
Pooh's Hunny Pot Challenge	Walt Disney Internet Group	2003	Mobile phone
Pooh's Pairs	Walt Disney Internet Group	2003	Mobile phone
Tigger's Bouncin' Time	Walt Disney Internet Group	2003	Mobile phone
Pooh's Hunny Blocks	Walt Disney Internet Group	2003	Mobile phone
Winnie the Pooh's Rumbly Tumbly Adventure	Phoenix Games Studio, Ubisoft	2005	Game Boy Advance, GameCube, PlayStation 2, mobile phone
Kuma no Pooh-San: 100 Acre no Mori no Cooking Book	Disney Interactive Studios	2011	Nintendo DS
Disney's Winnie the Pooh and the Honey Tree Animated Storybook	Disney Interactive Studios	2014	Windows

== See also ==
- List of Winnie-the-Pooh characters
