= Kenneth Sansom =

Kenneth Sansom may refer to:

- Ken Sansom, American actor
- Kenny Sansom, former English international footballer
