= A Very Merry Pooh Year =

Winnie the Pooh: A Very Merry Pooh Year
- NTSC DVD cover
- Directed by: Jamie Mitchell; Gary Katona; Ed Wexler; Ken Kessel
- Written by: Karl Geurs (interstitials, Winnie the Pooh and Christmas Too); Ted Henning (interstitials); Mark Zaslove (Winnie the Pooh and Christmas Too); Brian Hohlfeld (Happy Pooh Year)
- Produced by: Gary Katona; Ed Wexler; Antran Manoogian; Jamie Mitchell
- Starring: Jim Cummings; John Fiedler; Paul Winchell; Ken Sansom; Peter Cullen; Kath Soucie; Nikita Hopkins; William Green; Michael Gough
- Narrated by: Michael York
- Music by: Original score: Mark Watters; Score from Winnie the Pooh and Christmas Too: Steve Nelson; Thomas Richard Sharp
- Production company: Walt Disney Television Animation
- Distributed by: Walt Disney Home Entertainment (Note: Released through the Walt Disney Pictures banner.)
- Release date: November 12, 2002
- Running time: 70 minutes
- Country: United States
- Language: English

A Very Merry Pooh Year (also known as Winnie the Pooh: A Very Merry Pooh Year) is a 2002 American direct-to-video Christmas animated musical film produced by Walt Disney Television Animation. The film features the 1991 Christmas television special Winnie the Pooh and Christmas Too, as well as a new film, Happy Pooh Year. The film animation production was done by Wang Film Productions Co., Ltd., and Sunwoo Animation, (Korea) Co., Ltd. A Very Merry Pooh Year was released by Walt Disney Home Entertainment on November 12, 2002.

This was the only Winnie the Pooh film where Jeff Bennett provided Christopher Robin's singing voice. It was also the first Winnie the Pooh film where Owl is absent, and the first Winnie the Pooh film that Carly Simon is involved in the soundtrack.

== Plot ==
On Christmas Eve, Winnie the Pooh is having trouble setting up his Christmas tree. Pooh slips and falls, and breaks a shelf holding a present he made for Piglet. When Piglet suddenly arrives, Pooh desperately searches for a new hiding place for the present (since the broken shelf can no longer stay up) as more of his friends arrive at the door, eventually hiding it in an empty honey pot before helping himself to a full pot of honey, but forgets to answer the door. Afterward, his friends, tired of waiting for Pooh to answer, invite themselves in and proceed to help decorate his house. At one point, Tigger annoys Rabbit with some jingle bells. After they settle down to tell stories, Rabbit tells how they almost missed out on getting gifts one year, re-telling the story of Winnie the Pooh and Christmas Too. Afterward, Pooh appears dressed as Santa and exchanges gifts with everyone.

The next morning is Christmas Day and everyone ventures out into the snow to enjoy the aftermath of Christmas as Tigger again annoys Rabbit with his collection of jingle bells, prompting the latter to take them away. After Pooh receives his gift from Piglet, he remembers that he has not yet given Piglet his gift, and is unable to remember where he put it. He searches for it until New Year's Eve. Christopher Robin finds Pooh and explains to him how New Year's is celebrated. Pooh decides that he'll ask Rabbit if he can host the party at his house and goes off to propose the idea to him. Meanwhile, Rabbit is focused on preserving a carrot he saved for winter so he can use it to restart his garden when Spring comes. After a series of mishaps (involving Pooh inviting himself in and eating out of Rabbit's cupboard, Piglet getting spooked and hiding under his bed, Tigger annoying Rabbit with his bouncing, and Eeyore being in the way and gloomy as usual), a fed-up Rabbit throws them out and declares his plan to leave the Hundred Acre Wood. Not wanting Rabbit to leave, Pooh suggests the idea of using their New Year's resolutions to change their ways for their friend: Pooh vows never to eat honey again, Piglet agrees to be brave, Tigger vows to not bounce anymore, and Eeyore promises to be more positive. However, their resolutions cause them to switch personalities as a result; Pooh becomes gloomy and downbeat like Eeyore, Piglet becomes zany and bouncy like Tigger, Eeyore develops a taste for honey and dresses in Pooh's clothes (all while standing on two legs), and Tigger becomes paranoid and panicky like Piglet (having also tied a rock to his tail to keep himself from bouncing). This only makes Rabbit more annoyed and want to leave. After leaving, Rabbit finds himself in trouble after tumbling and sliding through the snow and being catapulted into the air by his suitcase.

They all begin searching for Rabbit when they find him stuck in a large tree, about to be abducted by bees. They gradually all regain their old personalities and Tigger manages to rescue Rabbit by bouncing up to first rescue his carrot, and then grab hold of his scarf the bees were using to abduct him and safely bring them back down in the snow. The animals express shame at not being able to keep their resolutions, but Rabbit, upon realizing their intentions, is touched and assures them that he loves them just the same and that if anything, he is the one who needs to change his perspective and be more accepting of their quirks and flaws. They reunite with Christopher Robin and return to Rabbit's house to celebrate the New Year, where everyone reconciles and enjoys the festivities as planned. Rabbit gives Tigger back the jingle bells he took from him. Pooh finally remembers where he put his Piglet's gift and quickly goes back to his house to get it. By the time he returns, Piglet opens the gift to find it's a musical box that he made for him that plays "Auld Lang Syne". Piglet is thankful for his gift and everybody joins to sing just as the film closes.

== Voice cast ==
- Jim Cummings as Winnie the Pooh and Tigger
- Peter Cullen as Eeyore
- John Fiedler as Piglet
- Michael Gough as Gopher
- William Green as Christopher Robin
- Nikita Hopkins as Roo
- Ken Sansom as Rabbit
- Kath Soucie as Kanga
- Michael York as Narrator
- Jeff Bennett as Piglet & Christopher Robin's singing voices
- Paul Winchell as Tigger (archive footage; Winnie the Pooh and Christmas Too)

== Songs ==
All tracks are written by Silversher & Silversher.

No.	Title	Performer(s)	Length
1.	"Winnie the Pooh"	Carly Simon feat. Jim Cummings
2.	"Jingle Bells"	Cast
3.	"Snow Snows"	Jim Cummings
4.	"Happy Pooh Year"	Jim Cummings
5.	"Hunny, No Not For Me"	Jim Cummings
6.	"Auld Lang Syne"	Carly Simon feat. Cast

== Home media ==
The film was released as a direct-to-DVD and direct-to-VHS on November 12, 2002. The film was released for the first time on Blu-ray on November 5, 2013, as the "Gift of Friendship Edition", the same day as the 30th Anniversary Blu-ray release for the 1983 animated featurette Mickey's Christmas Carol.

== See also ==
- List of Christmas films
