= Christopher Robin =

Fictional character created by A. A. Milne

- Winnie-the-Pooh character
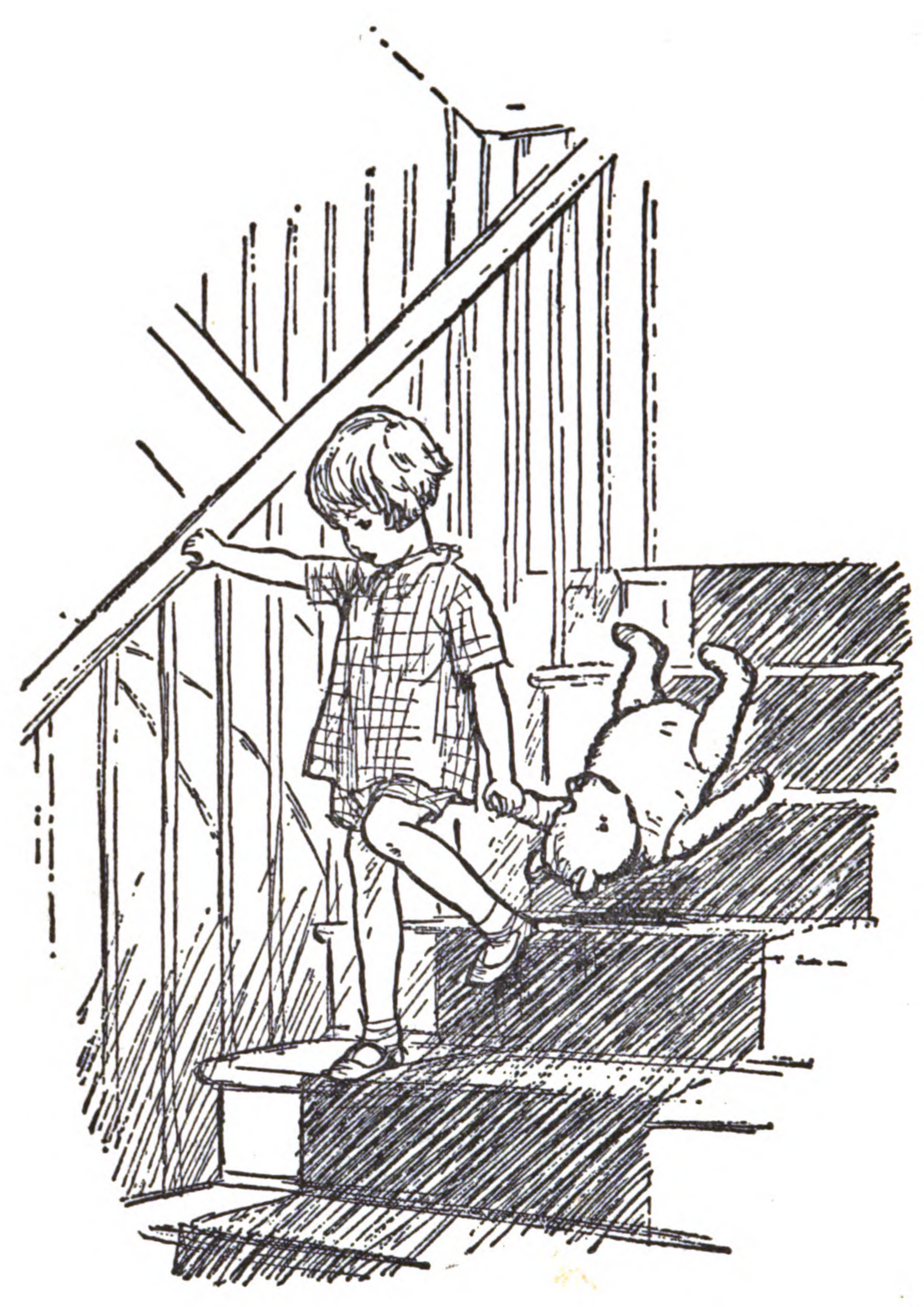
- Christopher Robin, walking down the stairs with his plush bear Winnie the Pooh, as seen in Winnie-the-Pooh
- First appearance: Winnie-the-Pooh (1926)
- Created by: A. A. Milne
- Based on: Christopher Robin Milne

In-universe information
- Gender: Male
- Nationality: English

Christopher Robin is a fictional character created by the English writer A. A. Milne, based on his own son Christopher Robin Milne. The character appears in the author's popular books of poetry and Winnie-the-Pooh stories, and has subsequently appeared in various Disney adaptations of the Pooh stories.

== Christopher Robin Milne ==
Christopher Robin was based on the author A. A. Milne's son, Christopher Robin Milne, who later in life became disappointed about the use of his name. Christopher Milne wrote in one of a series of autobiographical works: "It seemed to me almost that my father had got where he was by climbing on my infant shoulders, that he had filched from me my good name and left me nothing but empty fame," One of the poems, "Vespers" – which describes young Christopher Robin saying his evening prayers – was said by Christopher Milne as "the one work that has brought me over the years more toe-curling, fist-clenching, lip-biting embarrassment than any other."

== In the books ==
Christopher Robin appears in Milne's poems and in the two books: Winnie-the-Pooh (1926) and The House at Pooh Corner (1928). In the books he is a young boy and one of Winnie-the-Pooh's best friends. His other friends are Eeyore, Kanga and Roo, Rabbit, Piglet, Owl, and Tigger. In the second book, there are hints that Christopher Robin is growing up. In the final chapter, the inhabitants of the Forest throw him a farewell party after learning he must leave them soon. It is implied that he will attend boarding school; Christopher Robin Milne, for whom the stories were originally developed, left home to attend Stowe School at age 9.

In addition to both Pooh books, the character was immortalized in other works by A. A. Milne including two books of poems: When We Were Very Young (1924) and Now We Are Six (1927). An arrangement of one of the poems, Buckingham Palace, was first recorded by Ann Stephens in July 1941. Petula Clark released a recording of it in 1953 to coincide with the coronation of Queen Elizabeth II.

In David Benedictus's 2009 authorized sequel Return to the Hundred Acre Wood, Christopher Robin was at school, but during the summer break he returns to the forest for a visit with a lot of knowledge to share. Though slightly older, he is still the same person as before and is happy to share more good times with his friends all summer. At the end of the summer, he has to leave again for another school year, but the animals know they will see him again.

Christopher Robin is cheerful, compassionate, adventurous, fun-loving, imaginative, and helpful. Despite being a child, he is much wiser and more mature than many of the other characters, and is someone Pooh and the others look up to. In the book illustrations, his house appears as a hollow tree with a door at the top of the forest.

== Disney adaptations ==
Christopher Robin
- Disney's Winnie the Pooh character
- Christopher Robin in Pooh's Grand Adventure: The Search for Christopher Robin
- First appearance: Winnie the Pooh and the Honey Tree (1966)
- Created by: A.A. Milne
- Portrayed by: Ewan McGregor (adult); Orton O'Brien (child); (Christopher Robin)
- Voiced by: Bruce Reitherman (1966); Jon Walmsley (1968); Timothy Turner (1974); Kim Christianson (1983); Tim Hoskins (1988–1991); Edan Gross (1991); Brady Bluhm (1997–2000); Frankie J. Galasso (1997); Tom Attenborough (2000); Paul Tiesler (2001–2003); William Green (2002); Tom Wheatley (2003-2004); Struan Erlenborn (2007–2010); Jack Boulter (2011); Oliver Bell (2016)

In-universe information
- Gender: Male
- Family: Unnamed mother 2018 film: Unnamed father; Evelyn Robin (wife); Madeline Robin (daughter)

Since 1966, Disney has released numerous features starring Winnie-the-Pooh and related characters. Christopher Robin appears in all of the Disney animated adaptations except for Welcome to Pooh Corner, Boo to You Too! Winnie the Pooh, Springtime with Roo, and Pooh's Heffalump Halloween Movie. But in most of the cartoons, he is only a supporting character, sometimes only appearing in a few scenes or episodes; in Pooh's Heffalump Movie, he only appears during the credits. His personality is virtually the same as in the books, but he attends day school instead of boarding school. An English boy living in the Ashdown Forest, Christopher Robin has brown hair. He wears a yellow polo shirt with white collar and trim on his short sleeves, blue shorts, white socks and black Mary Jane shoes (or sometimes red sneakers). On several appropriate occasions, he plays a snare drum. Christopher Robin's bedroom, but not Christopher Robin himself, appears in live-action opening sequences. In the world within his storybooks, his house appears just as it does in E. H. Shepard's illustrations.

The New Adventures of Winnie the Pooh re-imagines him as an American boy living in the suburban house 100 Acre Road whose backyard connects directly to the Hundred Acre Wood. His mother also appears in the series and Robin is apparently their surname in that continuity. Some of these elements were reused for The Book of Pooh, but the animals are once again characters in Christopher Robin's storybook. His hollow tree house does not appear from both series.

Christopher Robin has appeared on the television series House of Mouse with his friends in cameo appearances. While he does not appear in the Kingdom Hearts video game series, in this continuity the Winnie-the-Pooh book belongs to Merlin and Christopher Robin's role is played out mostly by Sora. He only appears in two episodes of My Friends Tigger and Pooh but in the whole series, he is absent as he is aged up and attending school and is replaced by his younger friend Darby, a feisty red-headed girl who is the main protagonist and hosts the series.

His appearance was updated for the 2011 film. He also appears with the same appearance as a playable character in the video game Disney Magic Kingdoms.

In the Doc McStuffins crossover special "Into the Hundred Acre Wood!", Christopher Robin visits Doc's toy hospital searching for Pooh, who has been admitted as a patient. Christopher Robin and Doc bond through their shared ability to talk to toys. The character is voiced by Oliver Bell.

Ewan McGregor played a grown-up version of the character in the 2018 Disney live-action film Christopher Robin, while Orton O'Brien portrays the character as a child. In this film adaptation, the now adult Christopher is director of efficiency at a luggage company, and Pooh ultimately helps him to devise a plan to significantly decrease the company's expenditures.

Christopher Robin has a cameo appearance in the 2023 short film Once Upon a Studio, where, together with his friends, he tries to help Pooh when he is stuck in a photo frame, and being part of the Walt Disney Animation Studios characters who gather to take a group photo.

=== Portrayals ===
Of the nine main characters, Christopher Robin has the most voice actors. He has been voiced by the following:

- Bruce Reitherman: Winnie the Pooh and the Honey Tree
- Jon Walmsley: Winnie the Pooh and the Blustery Day, The Many Adventures of Winnie the Pooh (also re-recorded Christopher's lines for Honey Tree)
- Timothy Turner: Winnie the Pooh and Tigger Too
- Kim Christianson: Winnie the Pooh and a Day for Eeyore
- Tim Hoskins: The New Adventures of Winnie the Pooh
- Edan Gross: Winnie the Pooh and Christmas Too
- Brady Bluhm: Pooh's Grand Adventure: The Search for Christopher Robin, A Winnie the Pooh Thanksgiving, A Valentine for You and Winnie the Pooh: Seasons of Giving
- Frankie J. Galasso: Pooh's Grand Adventure: The Search for Christopher Robin (singing voice)
- Tom Attenborough: The Tigger Movie
- Tom Wheatley: Piglet's Big Movie
- Kath Soucie: Piglet's Big Movie (singing voice)
- William Green: A Very Merry Pooh Year
- Paul Tiesler: The Book of Pooh
- Struan Erlenborn: My Friends Tigger and Pooh
- Jack Boulter: Winnie the Pooh (2011 film)
- Oliver Bell: Doc McStuffins

Reitherman, Hoskins, Gross and Tiesler are the only actors to use an American accent for the character. All others use received pronunciation.

== Blood and Honey ==
In the 2023 horror film Winnie-the-Pooh: Blood and Honey, Christopher Robin was played by Nikolai Leon, with Frederick Dallaway as young Christopher Robin. Like the 2018 Disney film, Christopher Robin is a grown adult, who sees his old friends again. However, due to leaving them for college five years ago, they are feral, and go on a rampage. He is depicted as a victim rather than a killer like his friends, because of the torture his former friends did to him.
