= Piglet's Big Movie =

2003 animated Disney film directed by Francis Glebas

- Theatrical release poster
- Directed by: Francis Glebas
- Screenplay by: Brian Hohlfeld
- Based on: Winnie-the-Pooh and The House at Pooh Corner by A. A. Milne
- Produced by: Michelle Pappalardo-Robinson
- Starring: John Fiedler; Jim Cummings; Nikita Hopkins; Ken Sansom; Peter Cullen; Kath Soucie; Andre Stojka; Tom Wheatley
- Edited by: Ivan Bilancio
- Music by: Carl Johnson (score); Carly Simon (songs)
- Production company: Disneytoon Studios (Note: Animation outsourced to Walt Disney Animation Japan.)
- Distributed by: Buena Vista Pictures Distribution (Note: Distributed through the Walt Disney Pictures banner.)
- Release dates: March 16, 2003 (El Capitan Theatre); March 21, 2003 (United States)
- Running time: 75 minutes
- Country: United States
- Language: English
- Budget: $46 million
- Box office: $62.9 million

Piglet's Big Movie is a 2003 American animated musical comedy film directed by Francis Glebas and written by Brian Hohlfeld. Produced by the Japanese arm of Disneytoon Studios, with animation provided by Walt Disney Animation Japan. The film features characters from the Winnie-the-Pooh books by A. A. Milne and E. H. Shepard and is the third theatrically released Winnie the Pooh feature film, following The Many Adventures of Winnie the Pooh (1977) and The Tigger Movie (2000). In the film, Piglet is ashamed of being small and clumsy and wanders off into the Hundred Acre Wood, leading all of his friends to form a search party to find him.

Piglet's Big Movie premiered on March 16, 2003 at the El Capitan Theatre in Los Angeles and was released in the United States on March 21, 2003 by Buena Vista Pictures Distribution. It received generally positive reviews from critics and grossed $62 million against a budget of $46 million.

== Plot ==
In the Hundred Acre Wood, Piglet has made a scrapbook containing pictures that depict all of the adventures he has gone on with his friends. One day, Piglet meets Winnie the Pooh, Tigger, Rabbit, and Eeyore, who exclude him from their plot to steal a swarm of bees' honey because of his small size, even after Piglet saves them from being attacked by the bees. Disheartened, Piglet sets out to discover how he can be useful. Meanwhile, after being getting attacked by the bees a second time, Piglet's friends discover his disappearance and decide to search for him; using Piglet's scrapbook as a guide, they use its pictures to tell the stories depicted therein, leading to several flashbacks.

The first story tells when Kanga and Roo first moved to the Hundred Acre Wood. Pooh, Piglet, Tigger, and Rabbit are afraid of them and Rabbit concocts a plan to use Piglet as a decoy, so they can ransom Roo to force Kanga to leave. Kanga sees through the ruse and decides to play along by pretending that Piglet is Roo. Initially frightened and embarrassed by Kanga's strict behavior towards him, Piglet soon begins to realize her kindness, and he convinces his friends to accept Kanga and Roo into the Wood. Back in the present, Roo joins the others in searching for Piglet.

The second story tells how Christopher Robin led everyone in the Hundred Acre Wood on an expedition to find the North Pole. The adventure turns catastrophic when Roo falls into a river as the rest of the gang frantically attempt to save him. Piglet uses a long stick to launch Roo out of the river before giving the stick to Pooh to try to catch Roo, who is caught by Kanga. Piglet's heroism is overlooked when Christopher Robin sees Pooh holding the stick, believing it to be the North Pole, and credits Pooh for finding it. Back in the present, the friends begin to realize how much they have ignored Piglet's actions.

The third story tells the building of the House at Pooh Corner. Pooh, Piglet, and Tigger get the idea of building Eeyore a house in an area they name "Pooh Corner", using some neatly stacked sticks for building. After many failed attempts, Pooh decides to offer Eeyore to move in with him before Eeyore reveals that the sticks Pooh, Piglet and Tigger found was actually his house. Piglet manages to rebuild Eeyore's house and shows it to him, satisfying the donkey.

Back in the present, an argument between Rabbit and Tigger ends with the scrapbook falling into a river. Without their guide and with a storm coming, the group sadly return to Piglet's house, where they draw pictures depicting all of Piglet's heroic actions; inspired by their drawings, they decide to resume their search for Piglet. During their search, they find Piglet's scrapbook suspended on a hollow log looming over a waterfall. Pooh goes to retrieve it, but he falls into a hole in the log, and the others are unable to reach him. At that moment, Piglet arrives and, with encouragement from his friends, helps pull Pooh to safety just as the log begins to break in half. Everyone manages to escape right when the front half of the log breaks off, but the scrapbook itself is destroyed by the fall. Although saddened by this loss, the group take Piglet back to his house to show him all of their drawings, much to Piglet's joy.

Some time later, a party is thrown in honor of Piglet during which Pooh reveals that he has renamed Eeyore's home "Pooh and Piglet Corner" in appreciation of all the big things that Piglet has ever done. During this scene, the camera pulls back to show a large shadow of Piglet behind everyone.

== Cast ==
- John Fiedler as Piglet
- Jim Cummings as Winnie the Pooh and Tigger
- Andre Stojka as Owl
- Kath Soucie as Kanga and Christopher Robin's singing voice
- Nikita Hopkins as Roo
- Peter Cullen as Eeyore
- Ken Sansom as Rabbit
- Tom Wheatley as Christopher Robin

== Production ==
Piglet's Big Movie was produced by Disneytoon Studios, Walt Disney Animation (Japan), Gullwing Co., Ltd, Studio Fuga, and T2 Studio.

The film was originally intended as a direct-to-video release, in February 2002 Disney announced that the film and The Jungle Book 2 would be released theatrically.

=== Sources ===
The film's plot is based primarily on five A. A. Milne stories: "In which Piglet meets a Heffalump," "In which Kanga and Baby Roo Come to the Forest, and Piglet Has a Bath," and "In which Christopher Robin Leads an Expedition to the North Pole" (chapters 5, 7, and 8 of Winnie-the-Pooh); and "In which a house is built at Pooh Corner for Eeyore" and "In which a search is organized and Piglet nearly meets the Heffalump again" (chapters 1 and 3 of The House at Pooh Corner).

== Music ==
Piglet's Big Movie (Soundtrack)

Soundtrack album by Carly Simon
- Released: March 18, 2003
- Recorded: 2002–2003
- Length: 43:02
- Label: Walt Disney Records
- Producers: Matt Walker; Carly Simon; Carl Johnson; Rob Mathes; Michael Kosarin

Professional ratings
Review scores
Source	Rating
AllMusic	3/5 stars

American singer-songwriter Carly Simon wrote seven new songs for the film, and performed six of them ("If I Wasn't So Small", "Mother's Intuition", "Sing Ho for the Life of a Bear", "With a Few Good Friends", "The More I Look Inside", and "Comforting to Know"), as well as recording her own version of the Sherman brothers' "Winnie the Pooh" theme song which she previously recorded in A Very Merry Pooh Year.

"The More It Snows" features Jim Cummings and John Fiedler, as Pooh and Piglet. Simon was accompanied by her children Ben Taylor and Sally Taylor on many of the songs. Renée Fleming accompanied Simon on the song "Comforting to Know". On "Sing Ho for the Life of a Bear" Simon was accompanied by the cast.

The soundtrack also features five tracks of the film's score by Carl Johnson, as well as five of Simon's original demonstration recordings.

=== Songs ===
Original songs performed in the film include:

No.	Title	Performer(s)	Length
1.	"Winnie the Pooh"	Carly Simon, Ben Taylor, Richard M. Sherman and Robert B. Sherman	2:53
2.	"If I Wasn't So Small (The Piglet Song)"	Carly Simon	1:57
3.	"Mother's Intuition"	Carly Simon	2:38
4.	"Sing Ho for the Life of a Bear"	Carly Simon & Cast	1:37
5.	"The More It Snows (Tiddely-Pom)"	Jim Cummings & John Fiedler	1:02
6.	"With A Few Good Friends"	Carly Simon, Ben Taylor & Sally Taylor	2:38
7.	"The More I Look Inside"	Carly Simon	4:22
8.	"Comforting to Know"	Carly Simon & Renée Fleming	4:37

== Reception ==
=== Box office ===
Piglet's Big Movie was number seven on the box-office charts on its opening weekend, earning $6 million. The film domestically grossed $23 million, half the amount of what The Tigger Movie earned, and it grossed nearly $63 million worldwide.

=== Critical response ===
On the review aggregator website Rotten Tomatoes, 70% of 77 critics' reviews are positive, with an average rating of 6.2/10. The website's consensus reads: "Wholesome and charming entertainment for young children." Metacritic, which uses a weighted average, assigned the film a score of 62 out of 100, based on 23 critics, indicating "generally favorable" reviews. Audiences polled by CinemaScore gave the film an average grade of "A" on an A+ to F scale.

Film critic Stephen Holden of New York Times called the film an "oasis of gentleness and wit". Nancy Churnin of The Dallas Morning News stated that Piglet's Big Movie was "one of the nifty pleasures in the process", despite her belief that "Disney may be milking its classics".

=== Accolades ===
Award	Category	Recipient	Result
Annie Awards	Outstanding Effects Animation	Madoka Yasue	Nominated

== Games ==
In 2003, Disney released Piglet's Big Game for the PlayStation 2, GameCube, and Game Boy Advance, as well as a game on CD-ROM that was also entitled Piglet's Big Game. The latter was developed by Doki Denki Studio and involves helping Piglet assist in the preparation for a "Very Large Soup Party". In their review, Edutaining Kids praised various features including the adventure/exploration aspect (the game is linear instead of using a main screen) and many of the activities (such as the color mixing, which they said offers an incredible variety of hues), but noted that it is much too brief and that Kanga and Roo are absent.

== Releases ==
=== Marketing ===
Disney released a teaser trailer of Piglet's Big Movie in May 2002 on The Many Adventures of Winnie the Pooh 25th-anniversary edition VHS and DVD home video releases and on the Winnie the Pooh: A Very Merry Pooh Year DVD release in November 2002. The teaser was later attached to theatrical screenings of Spirit: Stallion of the Cimarron, Lilo & Stitch, The Powerpuff Girls Movie and Stuart Little 2. The next trailer for the film was released with the theatrical screenings of Jonah: A VeggieTales Movie, Treasure Planet, The Wild Thornberrys Movie and The Jungle Book 2. The trailers for the film were also attached to other Disney home video releases.

=== Theatrical ===
The film premiered on March 16, 2003 and opened in theaters on March 21, 2003.

=== Home media ===
Piglet's Big Movie was released on DVD and VHS on July 29, 2003, in the United States. In the United Kingdom, the film was released on December 1, 2003.

== See also ==
- Winnie the Pooh (franchise)
- List of Disney theatrical animated features
