= Seasons of Giving =

Winnie the Pooh: Seasons of Giving
- 2003 DVD cover
- Directed by: Harry Arends; Jun Falkenstein; Karl Geurs
- Written by: Barbara Slade
- Produced by: Harry Arends; Barbara Ferro; Karl Geurs; Ken Tsumura
- Starring: Jim Cummings; Paul Winchell; Steve Schatzberg; John Fiedler; Ken Sansom; Brady Bluhm; Gregg Berger; Peter Cullen; Amber Hood; Laura Mooney; Nikita Hopkins; Tress MacNeille; Andre Stojka; Hal Smith
- Narrated by: Laurie Main
- Music by: Original score: Carl Johnson; Scores from The New Adventures of Winnie the Pooh: Steve Nelson; Thomas Richard Sharp
- Production companies: Walt Disney Home Video; Walt Disney Video Premiere; Walt Disney Television Animation
- Distributed by: Buena Vista Home Entertainment
- Release date: November 9, 1999
- Running time: 70 minutes
- Country: United States
- Language: English

Seasons of Giving (also known as Winnie the Pooh: Seasons of Giving) is a 1999 American direct-to-video Christmas animated musical film that included A Winnie the Pooh Thanksgiving, and the two episodes from The New Adventures of Winnie the Pooh ("Groundpiglet Day" and "Find Her, Keep Her") (these episodes take place during the first two seasons). It features a new song by the Sherman Brothers. Seasons of Giving was released by Buena Vista Home Entertainment on November 9, 1999.

== Plot ==
=== Groundpiglet Day ===
Tigger wants to ski, but Winnie the Pooh and Piglet point out that there's no snow. The group arrive at Rabbit’s house to ask him what day of the year it is, but after opening his front door and letting the wind blow in, Rabbit's calendar pages (November to February) get torn off and get swept under Rabbit's bed. Not realising this at all, he announces the day is February 2, Groundhog Day. In an effort to find out if there are two more weeks of winter or if spring comes tomorrow, they ask Gopher if there is a shadow. He points out he isn’t a groundhog, so they have Piglet pretend to be one. Thinking that winter is over, they all prepare for spring by airing out their houses, planting gardens and spring cleaning. Later that day, it snows. Feeling tricked, a furious Rabbit heads over to Piglet’s house and rebukes him for supposedly lying to them. Upon returning home, Rabbit spots wind blowing into his house and the calendar pages being blown outside. After putting the lost pages back on the calendar, he realises that today is actually November 13. Realising what he’s done, Rabbit goes to apologise to Piglet, only to find a note from Piglet saying that he's gone to look for a real groundhog. During his search, Piglet gets covered in snow. He digs himself out and heads home, but leaves his cap behind in the snow pile. Rabbit finds the snow pile and, thinking that Piglet is frozen solid, rushes him back home, where Pooh and Tigger are waiting. They try to help "Piglet", but end up melting the snow pile, forcing them to collect the melted snow in a bowl just as Piglet arrives. After Rabbit apologises for his mistake, he realises the real Piglet is right behind him. Rabbit then informs everyone of the correct date, and the group decide to prepare for Thanksgiving.

=== A Winnie the Pooh Thanksgiving ===
When Thanksgiving finally arrives, Winnie the Pooh and his friends bring food for the big dinner: honey, acorns, lemonade, biscuits, thistles and ice cream. However, Rabbit informs them that the items they brought are not traditional to Thanksgiving. He insists that a special traditional time of year should include special traditional items: turkey, cranberry sauce, special dishes and pumpkin pie. Rabbit assigns Owl to wash the dishes, Gopher to make the pumpkin pie, Tigger and Eeyore to pick the cranberries, and most importantly, Pooh and Piglet to get the turkey (which Piglet believes to be a monstrous bird). Tigger and Eeyore gather the cranberries, but fail to notice that there is a hole in the sack they used to gather the cranberries. Meanwhile, Gopher blows up some pumpkins to make the pumpkin pie, creating a big mess in Rabbit's house. When Tigger and Eeyore head back to gather more cranberries, they end falling in the turkey trap Pooh and Piglet had set up. Thinking they have captured a real turkey, Pooh and Piglet bring the sack containing Tigger and Eeyore back to Rabbit. Tigger and Eeyore manage to break out of the sack, shocking everyone. In his excitement, Tigger accidentally caught Eeyore's tail while holding the cranberries and this causes a shocked Eeyore to jump and fling the pumpkin pie in the air. Chaos breaks out as Rabbit manages to catch the pie, only to get his face planted into the pie by Tigger after knocking him off the fallen table. Owl loses control of the pile of plates he washed and thanksgiving decorations are destroyed. Demoralized, Rabbit calls off the feast and sadly heads back home. Everyone else disappointedly follows soon. While sadly and contemplatively eating his honey, Pooh realizes that if they all shared the food they originally brought, everyone can have a great Thanksgiving. Inspired and reinvigorated by this insight, Pooh rallies everyone and they surprise Rabbit with the Thanksgiving dinner they have set up. Dazed and confused at first, Rabbit is warmed by the gesture. They are all joined by Christopher Robin, who proposes a toast (with lemonade) to the best Thanksgiving celebration ever. Everyone sings about what Thanksgiving is really about: friends and thankfulness.

=== Find Her, Keep Her ===
A month later, on Christmas Eve, everyone (except Gopher and Christopher Robin) are at Rabbit's house celebrating Christmas. When Rabbit receives a letter from a bluebird named Kessie, he tells the story of how he met Kessie. In a flashback, Pooh, Tigger, Piglet, and Rabbit are trying to save a carrot from the winter storm, but are forced to abandon it upon seeing Kessie blowing away in the wind. They save her, but also make a mess in Rabbit's house. Rabbit decides to take care of her. Later, after an accident with preparing a bottle of milk for Kessie, he leaves Pooh and Piglet to watch over Kessie while he goes to work in the garden. They try giving Kessie a bath, but another accident occurs that causes the house to explode soap bubbles, with Kessie caught inside one. Rabbit manages to save her and makes her promise not to go in the air again despite how much she enjoys it. Later that summer, Rabbit reluctantly lets Kessie play with Tigger, but they end up on a fallen tree dangling over a cliff. Rabbit and Owl manage to save them before the tree falls down the cliff. Owl intends to teaches Kessie to fly, but an overprotective Rabbit refuses to let her, thinking that it is dangerous, and with that, they go home. In the fall, Kessie looks out the window to see wild ducks flying south for the winter. For days, she tries to fly without Rabbit knowing, but is caught by Pooh. Deciding to help, Pooh, Tigger, and Piglet have an idea on how to get Kessie south for the winter, a giant slingshot. When Kessie is about to take off, Rabbit arrives and stops her. He yells at Pooh for teaching Kessie to fly against his wishes and expresses disappointment to Kessie for breaking her promise, but Kessie explains that flying is what she's meant to do. Next, he tells Tigger to stay out of the conversation when he interrupts and let go of the slingshot. Tigger protests, so Rabbit forcefully does it for him, but (realizing too late that he is still inside the slingshot) is launched forwards and falls off the same cliff Kessie had fallen off of that summer. Kessie quickly swoops down and grabs Rabbit, and brings him back to the top. Now that Kessie can fly, she plans on going south the next day; this upsets Rabbit. The next morning, Owl, Pooh, Piglet, and Tigger say goodbye to Kessie as she prepares to fly south. Meanwhile, Rabbit finds a potted carrot that Kessie had planted in the summer. Deciding to respect Kessie's wishes, he rushes to say goodbye to Kessie, but is too late. However, he is happy when Kessie comes back to say goodbye. Pooh and Piglet later talk about seeing Kessie against before seeing Rabbit nearby, waiting for Kessie to come back. Back in the present, Rabbit tells Roo that he has not seen Kessie since then. Everyone hurries outside to decorate a tree. Christopher Robin arrives to help decorate. After the tree is done, Rabbit realizes he forgot the most important part: a star to go on top of the tree. Rabbit is really sad but then sees a falling star. Everyone gathers to make a wish, only to realize that it's not a falling star. It is Kessie holding a star, which she puts on the tree. Rabbit and Kessie hug, and Kessie wishes Rabbit a Merry Christmas.

== Voice cast ==
- Jim Cummings as Winnie the Pooh and Tigger (singing and new segments)
  - Paul Winchell as Tigger (archive footage)
- Steve Schatzberg as Piglet (singing and new segments)
  - John Fiedler as Piglet (archive footage)
- Ken Sansom as Rabbit
- Brady Bluhm as Christopher Robin
  - Tim Hoskins as Christopher Robin (archive footage)
  - Frankie J. Galasso as Christopher Robin's singing voice
- Gregg Berger as Eeyore (new segments)
  - Peter Cullen as Eeyore (archive footage)
- Amber Hood as Kessie (new segments)
  - Laura Mooney as Kessie (archive footage)
- Nikita Hopkins as Roo
- Tress MacNeille as Kanga
- Andre Stojka as Owl
  - Hal Smith as Owl (archive footage)
- Michael Gough as Gopher
- Laurie Main as Mr. Narrator

== Songs ==
All tracks are written by The Sherman Brothers and Silversher & Silversher.

No.	Title	Writer(s)	Performer(s)	Length
1.	"Winnie the Pooh"	The Sherman Brothers	M-pact
2.	"Seasons of Giving"	The Sherman Brothers	Chorus
3.	"Hooray, Hooray"	Michael Silversher & Patty Silversher	Jim Cummings
4.	"The Turkey Song"	Michael Silversher & Patty Silversher	Jim Cummings & Steve Schatzberg
5.	"Berrily We Roll Along"	Michael Silversher & Patty Silversher	Jim Cummings
6.	"Our Thanksgiving Day"	Michael Silversher & Patty Silversher	Jim Cummings, Steve Schatzberg, Frankie J. Galasso, Michael Gough, Ken Sansom & Andre Stojka

== Home media ==
Seasons of Giving was originally released on VHS on November 9, 1999. It was released on DVD on November 4, 2003.

It was reissued again as a 10th anniversary gift set edition on DVD on September 29, 2009 the same day as Muppet Christmas: Letters to Santa DVD. This release included a collectible stocking gift pack and includes two bonus episodes from The New Adventures of Winnie the Pooh Magic Earmuffs and The Wishing Bear.

== See also ==
- List of Christmas films
