= Kyle Stanger =

British actor

- Occupations: Actor, singer
- Years active: 2005–2010

Kyle Stanger is an English former child actor and singer. He was one of over 900 children (including his sister Jade Stanger) who auditioned to star in Pooh's Heffalump Movie as the voice of Lumpy the Heffalump, or Heffridge Trompler Brompet Heffalump IV (4th), at the age of 8. He eventually won the role. His performance drew positive reviews, including Entertainment Weekly describing Lumpy as "irresistibly voiced by 8-year-old Brit Kyle Stanger" and New York Times critic Anita Gates's comment that "adults as well as children may fall in love with Lumpy, partly because he's a sort of roly-poly lavender baby elephant but even more because of the endearing voice and infectious laugh of Kyle Stanger, a very young Briton making his movie and voice-over debut."

He later returned in the sequel film of sorts, Pooh's Heffalump Halloween Movie.

== Filmography ==
Year	Title	Voice role
2005	Pooh's Heffalump Movie	Lumpy the Heffalump
2005	Pooh's Heffalump Halloween Movie	Lumpy the Heffalump
