= Piglet (Winnie-the-Pooh) =

- Winnie-the-Pooh character
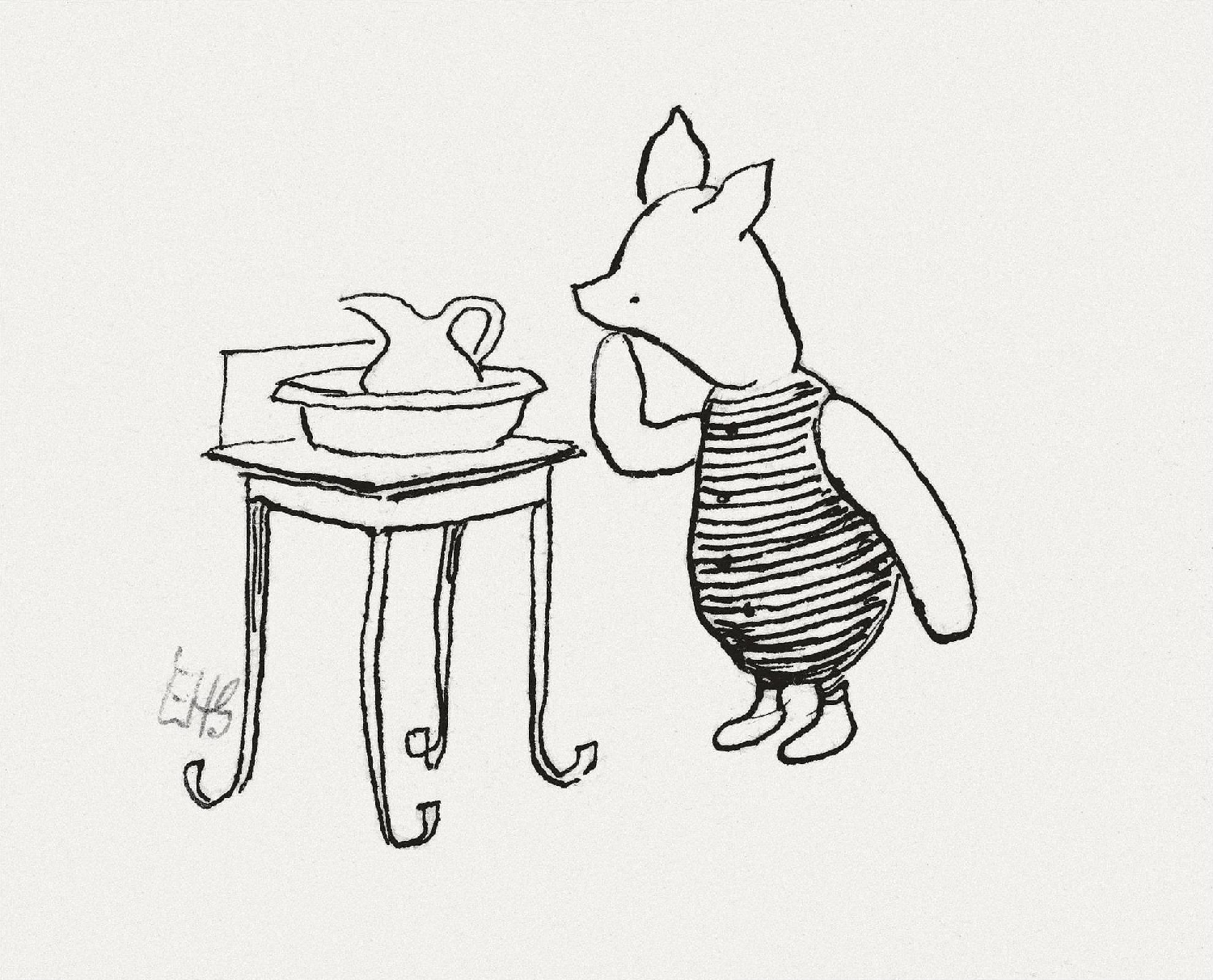
- Piglet illustrated by E.H. Shepard.
- First appearance: Winnie-the-Pooh (1926)
- Created by: A. A. Milne

In-universe information
- Species: Pig
- Gender: Male

Piglet is a fictional character from A. A. Milne's Winnie-the-Pooh books. Piglet is Winnie‑the‑Pooh's closest friend amongst all the toys and animals featured in the stories. Although he is a "Very Small Animal" of a generally timid disposition, he tries to be brave and on occasion conquers his fears.

== In the books ==
Piglet is introduced in the text from Chapter III of Winnie-the-Pooh, although he is shown earlier in one of the illustrations for Chapter II. He also appears in Chapters V, VI, VII, VIII, IX, and X, as well as every chapter of The House at Pooh Corner. Piglet is best friends with Pooh and is also especially close to Christopher Robin and the rest of the main characters.

Like most of the characters, Piglet was based on one of Christopher Robin Milne's stuffed animals. In the original colour versions of Ernest H. Shepard's illustrations in the Winnie‑the‑Pooh books, Piglet has pale pink skin and a green jumper. He is smaller than most animals, being only slightly taller than Roo. His voice is described as "squeaky".

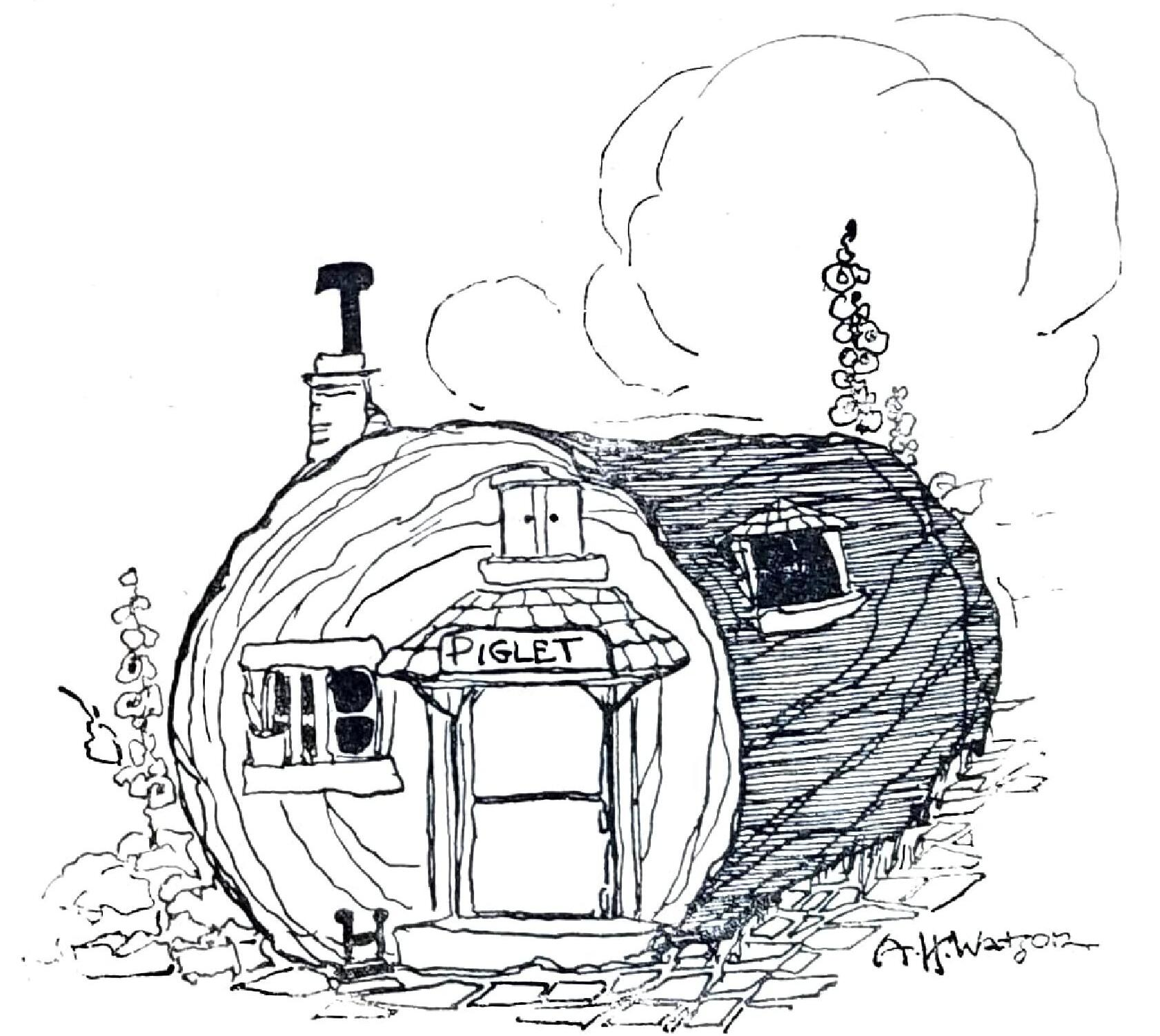
Piglet's House in a 1927 book, Sails of Gold

Piglet's adventures in the first book include hunting Woozles, attempting to capture Heffalumps, giving Eeyore a birthday balloon (popped), impersonating Roo in an attempt to trick Kanga, joining the Expotition to the North Pole, and being trapped by a flood. In the second book, he helps build a house for Eeyore, meets Tigger, finds Small while trapped in a gravel pit, plays Poohsticks, gets lost in the mist, and helps rescue Pooh and Owl after they are trapped in Owl's fallen house. For that last feat, Piglet is the subject of a seven-verse "Respectful Pooh Song" that Pooh composes for him.

Piglet himself can read and write, at least well enough for short notes. In the illustrations for The House at Pooh Corner, it appears that Piglet spells his own name "Piglit", although it is rendered as "Piglet" in the actual text even when describing his signature. In one chapter, Piglet is referred to as "Henry Pootel" by Christopher Robin, who claimed to not recognise Piglet after he was thoroughly cleaned by Kanga. Eeyore likes to refer to him as "Little Piglet".

Piglet's favourite food is acorns (or as the book often spells it, "haycorns"). At one point he plants one just outside his house, in hopes of someday having a handy supply. He lives in a house in a beech tree in the Hundred Acre Wood, next to a sign which says "TRESPASSERS W". An illustration shows that the sign is broken off after the "W." According to Piglet, that is "short for Trespassers Will, which is short for Trespassers William", which was the name of his grandfather (this was a parody of the usual sign "Trespassers will be prosecuted"). Later in The House at Pooh Corner, Eeyore mistakenly offers Piglet's house as a new home for Owl, after Owl's house had blown down. Piglet nobly agrees to let Owl have the house, at which point Pooh asks Piglet to live with him and Piglet accepts.

== Adaptations ==
In 1960, His Master's Voice recorded a dramatised version with songs (music by Harold Fraser-Simson) of two episodes from The House at Pooh Corner (Chapters 2 and 8), with Penny Morrell as Piglet, which was released on a 45 rpm EP.

=== Disney adaptations ===
Piglet
- Disney's Winnie the Pooh character
- First appearance: Winnie the Pooh and the Blustery Day (1968)
- Created by: A.A. Milne; Walt Disney Animation Studios
- Voiced by: John Fiedler (1966–2005); Robie Lester (record release); Phil Baron (Welcome to Pooh Corner); Steve Schatzberg (singing and occasional replacement; 1996–2005); Jeff Bennett (singing; 2001–2004); Travis Oates (2005–present); Nick Mohammed (Christopher Robin); Callum Vinson (Playdate with Winnie the Pooh)

In-universe information
- Species: Pig
- Gender: Male

Piglet was originally omitted by Disney in the first Pooh film, Winnie the Pooh and the Honey Tree (1966). According to director Wolfgang Reitherman, Piglet was replaced by Gopher, which was thought to have a more "folksy, all-American, grass-roots image". Many familiar with the classic Milne books protested Disney's decision to exclude Piglet, and Disney relented. Piglet appeared in the next Pooh film, Winnie the Pooh and the Blustery Day (1968).

Disney's interpretation of Piglet has pink skin and a magenta jumper. His fears and nervousness are played up more, as he runs and hides when unnecessary and often stutters when nervous. He has a lot of hidden courage and often faces danger to help others, even when afraid. Stories about him tend to revolve around these traits as well as his small size.

The Disney version of Piglet is very kindhearted, loves beautiful things like flowers, and prefers keeping things neat and tidy. He sometimes has an inferiority complex, although his friends think highly of him. However, he is often left performing tasks better suited to someone bigger and stronger, such as in several episodes of The New Adventures of Winnie the Pooh or the 2011 film.

Piglet can be found at the Walt Disney Parks and Resorts for meet and greets. He appears less frequently than Pooh, Tigger, and Eeyore, but more than Rabbit. Piglet also made a brief cameo in the 1988 movie Who Framed Roger Rabbit as a silhouette. He was featured as one of the guests in House of Mouse.

==== Casting history ====
John Fiedler provided the voice for Piglet from 1968 until his death on June 25, 2005, except in Welcome to Pooh Corner where Phil Baron voiced him.

Travis Oates has provided Piglet's voice since Fiedler's death, beginning with Pooh's Heffalump Halloween Movie in certain scenes that Fiedler was unable to record before his death. Oates' first major performance as Piglet was in My Friends Tigger & Pooh. He and Jim Cummings were the only actors to return for the 2011 film Winnie the Pooh. Piglet was voiced by Nick Mohammed for the 2018 live-action film Christopher Robin.

==== Appearances ====
Theatrical featurettes

- Winnie the Pooh and the Blustery Day (1968)
- Winnie the Pooh and Tigger Too (1974)
- Winnie the Pooh Discovers the Seasons (1981)
- Winnie the Pooh and a Day for Eeyore (1983)

Feature-length films

- The Many Adventures of Winnie the Pooh (1977)
- Who Framed Roger Rabbit (1988, brief cameo only)
- Pooh's Grand Adventure: The Search for Christopher Robin (1997; direct-to-video)
- Seasons of Giving (1999; direct-to-video)
- The Tigger Movie (2000)
- The Book of Pooh: Stories from the Heart (2001; direct-to-video)
- Mickey's Magical Christmas: Snowed in at the House of Mouse (2001; direct-to-video)
- Mickey's House of Villains (2002; direct-to-video)
- A Very Merry Pooh Year (2002; direct-to-video)
- Piglet's Big Movie (2003)
- Winnie the Pooh: Springtime with Roo (2004; direct-to-video)
- Pooh's Heffalump Movie (2005)
- Pooh's Heffalump Halloween Movie (2005; direct-to-video)
- Super Sleuth Christmas Movie (2007; direct-to-video)
- Tigger & Pooh and a Musical Too (2009; direct-to-video)
- Super Duper Super Sleuths (2010; direct-to-video)
- Winnie the Pooh (2011)
- Christopher Robin (2018)

Television series

- Welcome to Pooh Corner (1983–1986)
- The New Adventures of Winnie the Pooh (1988–1991)
- House of Mouse (2001–2003, cameo appearances)
- The Book of Pooh (2001–2003)
- My Friends Tigger & Pooh (2007–2010)
- Doc McStuffins (2017, guest appearance; episode "Into the Hundred Acre Wood!")
- Playdate with Winnie the Pooh (2023–present)

Television specials

- Winnie the Pooh and Christmas Too (1991)
- Boo to You Too! Winnie the Pooh (1996)
- A Winnie the Pooh Thanksgiving (1998)
- A Valentine for You (1999)

=== Soviet adaptation ===
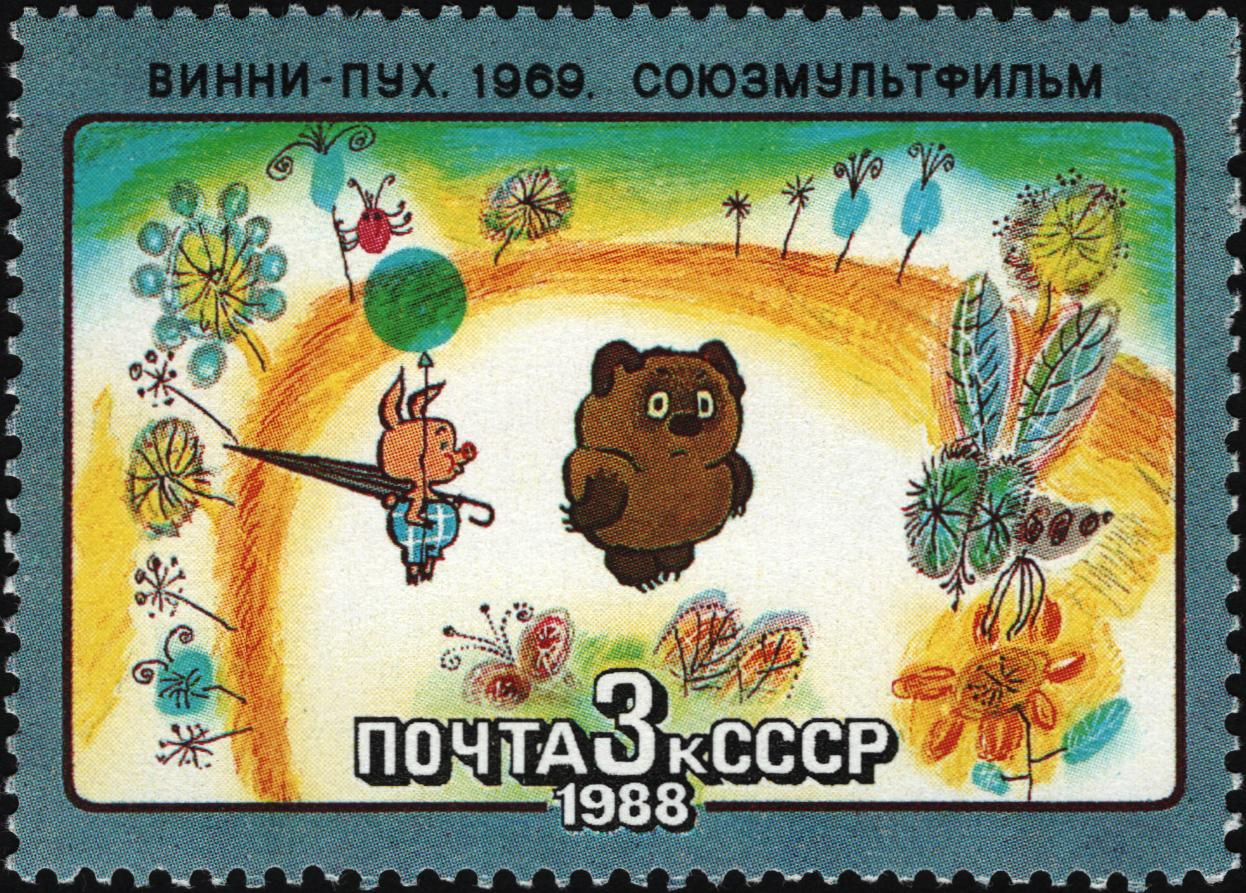
A postage stamp showing Piglet and Winnie-the-Pooh as they appear in the Russian adaptation

In the Soviet Union, a trilogy of short films about Winnie‑the‑Pooh (Russian language: Винни-Пух, or "Vinni Pukh") were made by Soyuzmultfilm (directed by Fyodor Khitruk) from 1969 to 1972. In all three films Piglet, renamed Pyatachok (Пятачок, Pig Snout) and voiced by Iya Savvina, is Pooh's constant companion, even taking Christopher Robin's place in the story concerning Pooh and the honey tree. Unlike the Disney adaptations, animators did not rely on Shepard's illustrations to depict the characters.

=== The Twisted Childhood Universe adaptation ===
Piglet is an antagonistic character in the slasher film Winnie-the-Pooh: Blood and Honey (2023) and its sequel Winnie-the-Pooh: Blood and Honey 2 (2024).

== Influence on popular culture ==
The Te of Piglet was written by Benjamin Hoff following the publication of The Tao of Pooh. Both books feature the original drawing of E. H. Shepard. The Te of Piglet details Piglet's exemplification of the Taoist concept of "virtue of the small".

In 1982, whilst studying at Oxford University as an undergraduate, the columnist and commentator Andrew Sullivan adopted the persona of Piglet in holding office in the University Pooh Sticks Club as cited in the 1987 book The Oxford Myth.

Piglet makes a cameo appearance in the DreamWorks animated film Bee Movie along with Pooh; at one point, a man spies Pooh and Piglet eating honey and Barry tells him to "take him out" with a tranquiliser dart.

== See also ==
- Piglet's Big Movie
