= Roo =

Character in Winnie-the-Pooh

- Winnie-the-Pooh character
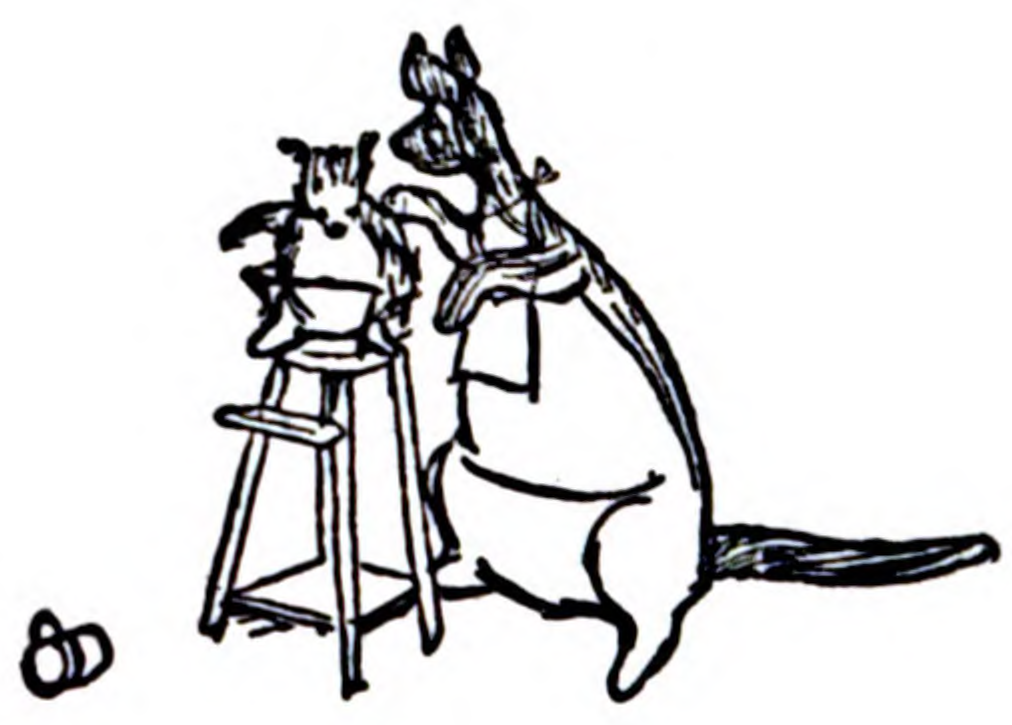
- Illustration of Kanga and Roo by Ernest Howard Shepard from Winnie-the-Pooh (1926), by A A Milne
- First appearance: Winnie-the-Pooh (1926)
- Created by: A. A. Milne

In-universe information
- Species: Kangaroo joey
- Gender: Male
- Family: Kanga (mother)
- Nationality: English

Roo is a fictional character created in 1926 by A. A. Milne and first featured in the book Winnie-the-Pooh. He is a young kangaroo (known as a joey) and his mother is Kanga. Like most other Pooh characters, Roo is based on a stuffed toy animal that belonged to Milne's son, Christopher Robin Milne. However, he was lost in the 1930s in an apple orchard somewhere in Sussex.

Roo participates in the adventures of a teddy bear called Winnie-the-Pooh and his friends Piglet, a small toy pig; Eeyore, a toy donkey; Owl, a live owl; Rabbit, a live rabbit; and Christopher Robin, a human boy. Roo is introduced in the chapter entitled "In Which Kanga and Baby Roo Come to the Forest and Piglet has a Bath." Roo's friend Tigger does not appear until the sequel, The House at Pooh Corner. He would subsequently appear in various cartoons and other adaptations.

== Profile ==
Roo is a young kangaroo, or joey. His mother is called Kanga. The New York Times has noted that inquiring about the fate of Roo's father is one of many questions that could be asked, such as "Where are Pooh's pants?"

Because of his young age, Roo is a very small animal, the smallest in the story (other than Rabbit's friends and relations, and Alexander Beetle), although he must be very close in size to Piglet since Kanga is unable to tell the difference when Piglet jumps into her pouch instead of Roo. (In Ernest H. Shepard's illustrations, Roo appears to be very slightly smaller than Piglet.) He is also apparently small enough to fall down mouse holes while practicing jumps, and too small to reach the first rail of the Poohsticks bridge.

Like most of the characters in Winnie-the Pooh, Roo was based on one of Christopher Robin Milne's stuffed toys. The illustrations show Roo with brown fur and an upturned tail.

Roo and Kanga come to the Forest "in the usual way" in Chapter VII of Winnie–the–Pooh. He also appears in Chapter VIII, is mentioned in Chapter IX, and appears again in Chapter X of that book. In The House at Pooh Corner, Roo appears in chapters II, IV, VI, VII, IX, and X, and is mentioned in a few others. Some of the adventures that Roo experiences include being "kidnapped" by Rabbit, accompanying the "expotition" to the North Pole (and getting an impromptu swimming lesson), attending Christopher Robin's party for Pooh, getting stuck in a tree with Tigger, and playing Poohsticks.

Unlike many of the other characters in the Pooh books, Roo does not have a known favorite food, although his mother makes him watercress sandwiches on occasion. He dislikes the extract of malt that his mother gives him as "strengthening medicine" after meals, though he will reluctantly take it.

Some of Roo's friends include Tigger, Winnie-the-Pooh, Piglet, Eeyore, Rabbit, Owl, and Christopher Robin.

== Adaptations ==
=== Disney adaptation ===
Roo also appears in the Disney cartoon versions of the Winnie the Pooh stories.

In the cartoons, Roo is the smallest of the regularly appearing characters. He has brown fur and wears a light blue shirt. He often expresses thoughts and feelings that make him seem wiser than his years. In fact, on occasion Roo seems even wiser than many of the older characters.

He states that he's got a mother (Kanga) when he tries to comfort Tigger in The Tigger Movie. He appeared in Piglet's Big Movie and his own direct-to-video movie, Springtime with Roo.

Roo becomes good friends with Lumpy the Heffalump in Pooh's Heffalump Movie.

Roo appeared as one of the guests in House of Mouse and Mickey's Magical Christmas: Snowed in at the House of Mouse.

Roo made his first live action appearance in the 2018 film Christopher Robin, voiced by Sara Sheen.

==== Portrayals ====
- Clint Howard (Winnie the Pooh and the Honey Tree and Winnie the Pooh and the Blustery Day)
- Dori Whitaker (Winnie the Pooh and Tigger Too)
- Dick Billingsley (Winnie the Pooh and a Day for Eeyore)
- Kim Christianson (Welcome to Pooh Corner)
- Nicholas Melody (The New Adventures of Winnie the Pooh)
- Robie Lester (record release)
- Nikita Hopkins (1998–2005)
- Jimmy Bennett (2004–2006)
- Max Burkholder (2007–2010)
- Wyatt Hall (2011 film and Kinect: Disneyland Adventures)
- Sara Sheen (Christopher Robin)
- Aidan McGraw (Kingdom Hearts III)

=== Other adaptations ===
Roo appears in the Shirley Temple's Storybook episode, played by Louis Jean Norman.

Roo is planned to appear in the 2027 film Winnie-the-Pooh: Blood and Honey 3 – The Lost Years.

== Satirical psychological study ==
A tongue-in-cheek psychological study of Roo was published in the year 2000, by pediatricians at Dalhousie University in Halifax, Nova Scotia, in the Canadian Medical Association Journal during its end of year issue in April; which publishes lighter more parody-style content. This Canadian team was following the trend of analyzing famous art works, to point out that even wonderful people can have disorders. Reuters reported as follows about the Canadian study:

The researchers said they are especially worried about baby Roo, who is growing up in a single-parent household and whose closest friend, Tigger, is not a good role model. "We predict we will someday see a delinquent, jaded, adolescent Roo hanging out late at night at the top of the forest, the ground littered with broken bottles of extract of malt and the butts of smoked thistle," the article said.
