= Pooh's Heffalump Movie =

2005 animated Disney film directed by Frank Nissen

- Theatrical release poster
- Directed by: Frank Nissen
- Screenplay by: Brian Hohlfeld; Evan Spiliotopoulos
- Based on: Characters created by A. A. Milne
- Produced by: Jessica Koplos-Miller
- Starring: Jim Cummings; John Fiedler; Kath Soucie; Nikita Hopkins; Ken Sansom; Peter Cullen; Kyle Stanger; Brenda Blethyn
- Edited by: Robert Fisher Jr.; Nancy Frazen; Anthony F. Rocco
- Music by: Joel McNeely (score); Carly Simon (songs)
- Production company: Disneytoon Studios (Note: Animation outsourced to Walt Disney Animation Japan.)
- Distributed by: Buena Vista Pictures Distribution (Note: Distributed by Buena Vista Pictures Distribution under the Walt Disney Pictures banner.)
- Release dates: February 11, 2005 (United States); May 24, 2005 (Disney DVD and video)
- Running time: 68 minutes
- Country: United States
- Language: English
- Budget: $20 million
- Box office: $52.9 million

Pooh's Heffalump Movie is a 2005 American animated musical comedy film directed by Frank Nissen and written by Brian Hohlfeld and Evan Spiliotopoulos. Produced by the Japanese arm of Disneytoon Studios, with animation provided by Walt Disney Animation Japan, it features the characters from A. A. Milne's Winnie-the-Pooh stories, and it is the fifth animated feature film in Disney's Winnie the Pooh franchise.

Pooh's Heffalump Movie was released in the United States on February 11, 2005 by Buena Vista Pictures Distribution. It received generally positive reviews from critics and grossed $53 million worldwide. It was followed by a direct-to-video Halloween sequel, Pooh's Heffalump Halloween Movie, also released in 2005.

== Plot ==
One morning in the Hundred Acre Wood, Roo and his friends Winnie the Pooh, Piglet, and Tigger are surprised when they wake up to hear a loud trumpeting noise. While they visit Rabbit's house for help in determining the source of the sound, Roo discovers a trail of large, circular footprints, which Rabbit concludes to have come from a Heffalump, an elephant-like creature whose species is feared by the inhabitants of the Hundred Acre Wood due to its supposed hostility. Per Roo's suggestion, Rabbit organizes an expedition to travel to Heffalump Hollow and capture the Heffalumps living there in order to prevent further invasions. Despite his determination, Roo is forbidden from participating in the expedition due to his young age, prompting him to start his own solo Heffalump hunt the next day.

While exploring Heffalump Hollow, Roo meets a friendly young Heffalump called Lumpy, who openly expresses his wish to find his own trumpeting call to communicate with his fellow Heffalumps. As he gets to know Lumpy, Roo soon learns that the Heffalumps are different from his friends' depiction of them and offers to take Lumpy on a tour of the Hundred Acre Wood, which Lumpy agrees to. During the tour, Roo and Lumpy play games together and form a strong friendship but not without accidentally making a mess of Pooh's house and Rabbit's garden. Meanwhile, Rabbit and the gang return home from the unsuccessful Heffalump expedition to find the mess that Roo and Lumpy made; concluding that a Heffalump was the cause of this, they begin setting up traps to catch it.

After hearing Lumpy's mother calling him, Roo and Lumpy begin to search for her, without success, which causes Lumpy to become increasingly depressed until Roo gets the idea to enlist the help of his own mother, Kanga. Roo and Lumpy soon find Kanga, along with Rabbit, Pooh, Piglet, and Tigger, who attack Lumpy after erroneously believing that he tried to kidnap Roo. Feeling betrayed, Lumpy runs away only to get trapped in a cage. Following after Lumpy, Roo frees him from the cage and the two reconcile with Kanga watching them in approval. Afterwards, Roo reveals his friendship with Lumpy to Rabbit and the others and calls them out for their prejudice towards Heffalumps.

As Roo's friends reluctantly agree to let Lumpy go, a still-scared Lumpy stumbles off a ledge and accidentally knocks Roo into a large pile of logs. When Roo's friends are unable to move the logs, Lumpy decides to use his trunk to call his mother for help, finally finding his own trumpeting call in the process. Upon hearing his calls, Lumpy's mother arrives and successfully rescues Roo. This act of heroism causes Pooh and his friends to finally acknowledge the Heffalumps' benevolence, and the two clans make peace with each other.

== Cast ==
- Nikita Hopkins as Roo (final film role)
- Kyle Stanger as Lumpy the Heffalump
- Jim Cummings as Winnie the Pooh and Tigger
- John Fiedler as Piglet
- Peter Cullen as Eeyore
- Ken Sansom as Rabbit
- Kath Soucie as Kanga
- Brenda Blethyn as Mama Heffalump (Lumpy’s Mother)
- Additional voices by Tara Strong

== Production ==
Pooh's Heffalump Movie was produced by Disneytoon Studios and Walt Disney Animation (Japan).

The film was originally intended as a direct-to-video release.

Heffalumps were first mentioned in the original Winnie-the-Pooh books. They appeared in a nightmare sequence – along with their fellow scary creatures, the woozles – in 1968's Winnie the Pooh and the Blustery Day. Though heffalumps and woozles have appeared in other Disney's Winnie the Pooh media, such as The New Adventures of Winnie the Pooh TV series, this was the first theatrical film to feature a "real" heffalump. Lumpy's design is similar to the heffalumps seen in the 1968 featurette and the song "The Horribly Hazardous Heffalumps!" is in the same style as "Heffalumps and Woozles" from Blustery Day. Carly Simon came up with Lumpy's full name, Heffridge Trumpler Brompet Heffalump, IV.

This was the final theatrically released film to feature voice actor John Fiedler as Piglet and the final Winnie the Pooh film to be released in Fiedler's lifetime, as he died four months later from cancer.

This was also Ken Sansom's last theatrically released film before his death on October 8, 2012.

Once the film was completed, Disney closed the Walt Disney Animation Japan studio in June 2004, eight months before the film's release.

== Releases ==
=== Theatrical ===
The film premiered and opened in theaters on February 11, 2005.

=== Home media ===
Pooh's Heffalump Movie was released on DVD and VHS on May 24, 2005, in the United States. In the United Kingdom, the film was released on July 11, 2005, and later in a trilogy DVD on November 7, 2011, along with The Tigger Movie and Winnie the Pooh.

== Music ==
The Best of Pooh and Heffalumps, Too

Soundtrack album by Carly Simon
- Released: February 8, 2005
- Recorded: 2004
- Length: 33:34
- Label: Walt Disney Records
- Producers: Matt Walker; Carly Simon; Joel McNeely; Rob Mathes; Michael Kosarin

Professional ratings
Review scores
Source	Rating
AllMusic	3.5/5 stars

American singer-songwriter Carly Simon wrote five new songs exclusively for the film and performed four of them ("Winnie the Pooh", "Little Mr. Roo", "Shoulder to Shoulder", and "In the Name of the Hundred Acre Wood"), while in "The Horribly Hazardous Heffalumps!" Simon is accompanied by Jim Cummings, Ken Sansom, John Fiedler, and Nikita Hopkins. "The Name Game" features Kyle Stanger and Nikita Hopkins as Lumpy and Roo.

Two songs from Simon's earlier soundtrack for Piglet's Big Movie are also included on the soundtrack, "Winnie the Pooh (Theme Song)" and "With a Few Good Friends", in which Simon is joined by her children Ben Taylor and Sally Taylor.

The soundtrack also features one instrumental track entitled "The Promise" by Joel McNeely, as well as seven classic Winnie the Pooh songs written by the Sherman Brothers.

=== Songs ===
The original songs performed in the film were:

No.	Title	Performer(s)	Length
1.	"Winnie the Pooh"	Carly Simon & Ben Taylor	2:52
2.	"The Horribly Hazardous Heffalumps!"	Jim Cummings, Ken Sansom, John Fiedler & Nikita Hopkins	1:53
3.	"Little Mr. Roo"	Carly Simon & Kath Soucie	2:02
4.	"The Name Game"	Kyle Stanger & Nikita Hopkins	0:46
5.	"Shoulder to Shoulder"	Carly Simon & the Heffalump Chorus	3:22
6.	"In the Name of the Hundred Acre Wood"	Carly Simon & the Heffalump Chorus	2:26
7.	"With a Few Good Friends"	Carly Simon, Ben Taylor & Sally Taylor	2:38
8.	"The Promise"	Joel McNeely	2:25
9.	"Heffalumps and Woozles"	Chorus	2:05
10.	"The Wonderful Thing About Tiggers"	Jim Cummings	0:50
11.	"Up, Down, and Touch the Ground"	Jim Cummings	1:03
12.	"Rumbly in My Tumbly"	Jim Cummings	1:25
13.	"Little Black Rain Cloud"	Jim Cummings	1:27
14.	"Luv-a-Bye"	Kira Small	3:35
15.	"Winnie the Pooh"	Disney Afternoon Chorus	2:18
Total length:			33:34

== Reception ==
=== Box office ===
Pooh's Heffalump Movie made $5.8 million in its opening weekend, a per theater average of $2,296 from 2,529 theaters. The film ended up with a final gross of $18.1 million in North America and $34.8 million in other countries, bringing the total worldwide gross to $52.9 million.

=== Critical response ===
On the review aggregator website Rotten Tomatoes, 81% of 88 critics' reviews are positive, with an average rating of 6.54/10. The website's consensus reads: "A charming and delightful walk through the Hundred Acres Woods for young viewers." Metacritic, which uses a weighted average, assigned the film a score of 64 out of 100, based on 23 critics, indicating "generally favorable" reviews.

== Sequel ==
A sequel, Pooh's Heffalump Halloween Movie, was released direct-to-video on September 13, 2005.

== See also ==
- Winnie the Pooh (franchise)
- List of Disney theatrical animated features
