= Nikita Hopkins =

American child actor

- Occupations: Voice actor, singer, artist, screenwriter
- Years active: 1997–2006

Nikita Matthew Hopkins is an American retired screenwriter, visual artist, and former child voice actor and singer who had a career for seven years as the singing and speaking voice of young Roo in six movies and videos of Winnie-the-Pooh.

== Career ==
He began his career at The Walt Disney Company. His first role was the voice of Roo for Winnie the Pooh: Seasons of Giving, and he continued his voice work as Roo in The Tigger Movie, Mickey's Magical Christmas: Snowed in at the House of Mouse, Winnie the Pooh: A Very Merry Pooh Year, Piglet's Big Movie, and Pooh's Heffalump Movie, as well as in the television and video puppet series The Book of Pooh (2001–2003). He can also be heard as an additional voice for Lilo & Stitch: The Series, House of Mouse, The Zeta Project, 101 Dalmatians II: Patch's London Adventure, and more.

== Retirement and future ==
In 2006, Hopkins resigned from voice work and went on to study and work on motion pictures and television at the Academy of Art University in San Francisco, California.

== Selected filmography ==
- Winnie the Pooh: Seasons of Giving (1999) - Roo (voice)
- The Tigger Movie (2000) - Roo (voice) Nominated – Annie Award for Male Voice Acting in a Feature Production
- Clerks: The Animated Series (2000) - Campfire Kid (voice, episode: "Leonardo Leonardo Returns and Dante Has an Important Decision to Make")
- The Book of Pooh (2001–2002) - Roo (voice)
- House of Mouse (2001) - Chip (episode: "The 3 Caballeros")
- The Zeta Project (2001) - young Rudy Buenaventura (episode: "Kid Genius")
- Mickey's Magical Christmas: Snowed in at the House of Mouse (2001) - Roo (voice)
- 101 Dalmatians 2: Patch's London Adventure (2002) - Hoesome Tommy (voice)
- Winnie the Pooh: A Very Merry Pooh Year (2002) - Roo (voice)
- Piglet's Big Movie (2003) - Roo (voice)
- Pooh's Heffalump Movie (2005) - Roo (voice) (final film role)

== Video games ==
- My Interactive Pooh (1998) - Roo (voice)
- Winnie the Pooh: Toddler (1999) - Roo (voice)
- Disney's Beauty and the Beast Magical Ballroom (2000) - Chip (voice)
- Tigger's Honey Hunt (2000) - Roo (voice)
- Disney's Activity Center: Winnie the Pooh (2000) - Roo (voice)
- Winnie the Pooh: Baby (2001) - Roo (voice)
- Piglet's Big Game (2003) - Roo (voice)

== Live-action ==
- Power Rangers Wild Force (2002) - Soccer Boy #1 (episode: "Monitoring Earth")
