= Ken Sansom =

American actor (1927–2012)

- Born: Frank Kenneth Sansom; April 2, 1927; Salt Lake City, Utah, U.S.
- Died: October 8, 2012 (aged 85); Holladay, Utah, U.S.
- Resting place: Wasatch Lawn Memorial Park, Millcreek, Utah, U.S.
- Education: Brigham Young University
- Occupation: Actor
- Years active: 1954–2010
- Spouse: Carla Sansom (m. 1961)
- Children: 3
- Military service
- Allegiance: United States
- Service: United States Navy
- Service years: 1950–1953
- Unit: United Service Organizations
- Wars: Korean War

Frank Kenneth Sansom (April 2, 1927 – October 8, 2012) was an American actor. Among his best known roles, Sansom voiced Rabbit in animated television series, television specials, and animated films for Disney's Winnie the Pooh franchise from 1988 to 2010.

== Early life ==
Sansom was born on April 2, 1927, in Salt Lake City, Utah. He enlisted in the United States Navy soon after graduating from East High School in Salt Lake City in 1944.

Sansom enrolled at the University of Utah following World War II, but did not complete his studies there. He transferred to Brigham Young University, where he received a bachelor's degree in radio broadcasting in 1949.

He was recalled by the U.S. Navy for service during the Korean War. He served as a member of the United Service Organizations, providing entertainment to American troops while in Korea.

== Career ==
Sansom started his career in 1957 with a radio show in Los Angeles called Sansom and Then Some. He began acting in early 1968 when he moved to Los Angeles. His first role was in an episode of Mayberry R.F.D., a continuation of The Andy Griffith Show. He was best known for his role as Rabbit in the television series The New Adventures of Winnie the Pooh. He also voiced Stan, the Woozle in the series. He also voiced Rabbit in a number of TV specials and films, replacing Rabbit’s original voice actor Junius Matthews following his death in 1978.

In an interview with ABC 4, when asked about voicing Rabbit in the upcoming Winnie the Pooh film, he stated, "I'm not sure." Tom Kenny voiced Rabbit in the film, although Sansom claimed he was still under contract.

== Personal life ==
Sansom married Carla Sansom in 1961, they remained married until Sansom's death. Together they have three children.

Sansom was a member of the Church of Jesus Christ of Latter-day Saints.

== Death ==
Sansom died on October 8, 2012, in Holladay, Utah due to complications of a stroke at the age of 85. He resided in Sandy, Utah. His remains are buried in Wasatch Lawn Memorial Park in Millcreek, Utah, alongside his widow Carla.

== Filmography ==
=== Film ===
Year	Title	Role	Notes
1970	Shinbone Alley	Rosie (voice)	
1973	The Long Goodbye	Colony Guard	
1973	The Sting	Western Union Executive	
1974	Airport 1975	Gary	
1975	Funny Lady	Frederick Martin	
1978	The Small One	Baker (voice)	Uncredited
1979	Nutcracker Fantasy	Chamberlain, Wise Man (voice)	English dub
1979	Banjo the Woodpile Cat	Banjo's Father, Farmer (voice)	
1983	The Invisible Woman	Lionel Gilbert	Television film
1984	Gallavants	Thunk (voice)	
1985	Starchaser: The Legend of Orin	Magreb (voice)	
1987	The Chipmunk Adventure	Inspector Jamal (voice)	
1997	Pooh's Grand Adventure: The Search for Christopher Robin	Rabbit (voice)	Direct-to-video
1999	Seasons of Giving	Rabbit (voice)	Direct-to-video
2000	The Tigger Movie	Rabbit (voice)	
2001	The Book of Pooh: Stories from the Heart	Rabbit (voice)	Direct-to-video
2002	A Very Merry Pooh Year	Rabbit (voice)	Direct-to-video
2003	Piglet's Big Movie	Rabbit (voice)	
2004	Winnie the Pooh: Springtime with Roo	Rabbit (voice)	Direct-to-video
2005	Pooh's Heffalump Movie	Rabbit (voice)	
2005	Pooh's Heffalump Halloween Movie	Rabbit (voice)	Direct-to-video
2007	Super Sleuth Christmas Movie	Rabbit (voice)	Direct-to-video
2009	Tigger & Pooh and a Musical Too	Rabbit (voice)	Direct-to-video

=== Television ===
Year	Title	Role	Notes
1970	Tales of Washington Irving	Narrator (voice)	Television film
1970–71	Mayberry R.F.D.	Clarence, Ferguson	3 episodes
1971	The Brady Bunch	Stan Jacobsen	Episode: "The Liberation of Marcia Brady"
1974	Herbie Rides Again	Lawyer	
1974	Where Have All the People Gone?	Jack McFadden	
1974	Yes, Virginia, There Is a Santa Claus	Papa (voice)	Television film
1976	Charlie's Angels	Clerk	Television film (pilot)
1976–86	Days of Our Lives	Frederick Powell	Recurring role (49 episodes)
1983–85	The Littles	Dr. Hunter, Peterson (voice)	Main cast
1984–85	The Transformers	Hound (voice)	25 episodes
1985	The Super Powers Team: Galactic Guardians	Martin Stein (voice)	2 episodes
1985–86	Murder, She Wrote	Bert, Man	2 episodes
1988–91	The New Adventures of Winnie the Pooh	Rabbit (voice)	Main cast
1990	TaleSpin	Ralph Throgmorton (voice)	Episode: "On a Wing and a Bear"
1996	Boo to You Too! Winnie the Pooh	Rabbit (voice)	Television film
1998	A Winnie the Pooh Thanksgiving	Rabbit (voice)	Television film
1999	A Valentine for You	Rabbit (voice)	Television film
2001–03	The Book of Pooh	Rabbit (voice)	Main cast
2007–10	My Friends Tigger & Pooh	Rabbit (voice)	Main cast

=== Video games ===
Year	Title	Role	Notes
1998	My Interactive Pooh	Rabbit	
1999	Disney Learning: Winnie the Pooh	Rabbit	
2000	Tigger's Honey Hunt	Rabbit	
2001	Party Time with Winnie the Pooh	Rabbit	
2003	Piglet's Big Game	Rabbit	
2005	Winnie the Pooh's Rumbly Tumbly Adventure	Rabbit	
2006	Kingdom Hearts II	Rabbit	

Preceded by Will Ryan	Voice of Rabbit; 1988–2010	Succeeded by Tom Kenny
