= List of Winnie-the-Pooh characters =

This is a list of characters appearing in the "Winnie-the-Pooh" books and other adaptations, including Disney's adaptations of the series.

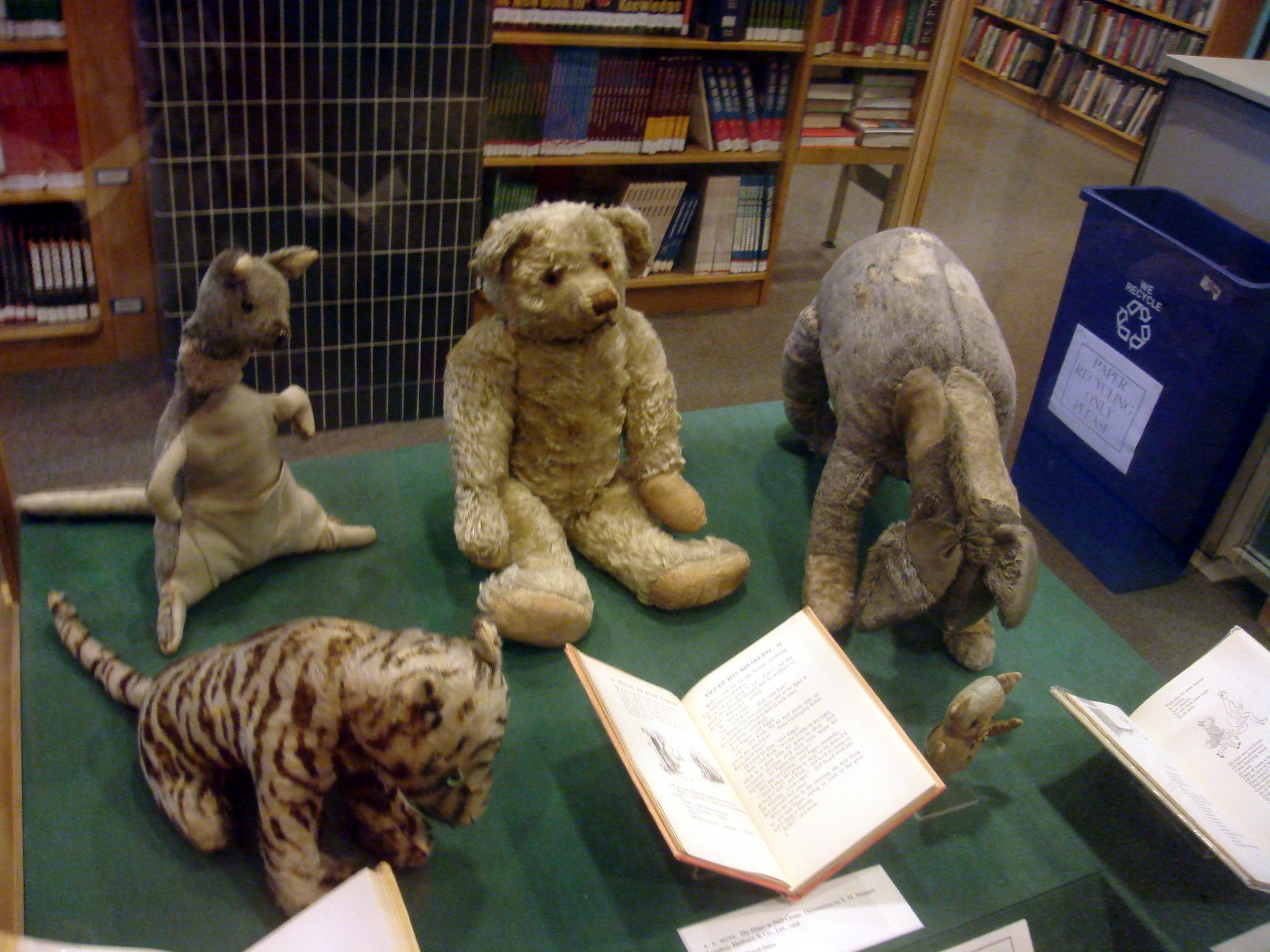
These stuffed animals are the ones that belonged to Christopher Robin Milne (with the exception of Roo, who was lost in the early 1930s), upon which the stories were based. They are on display in the Donnell Library Center in New York City.

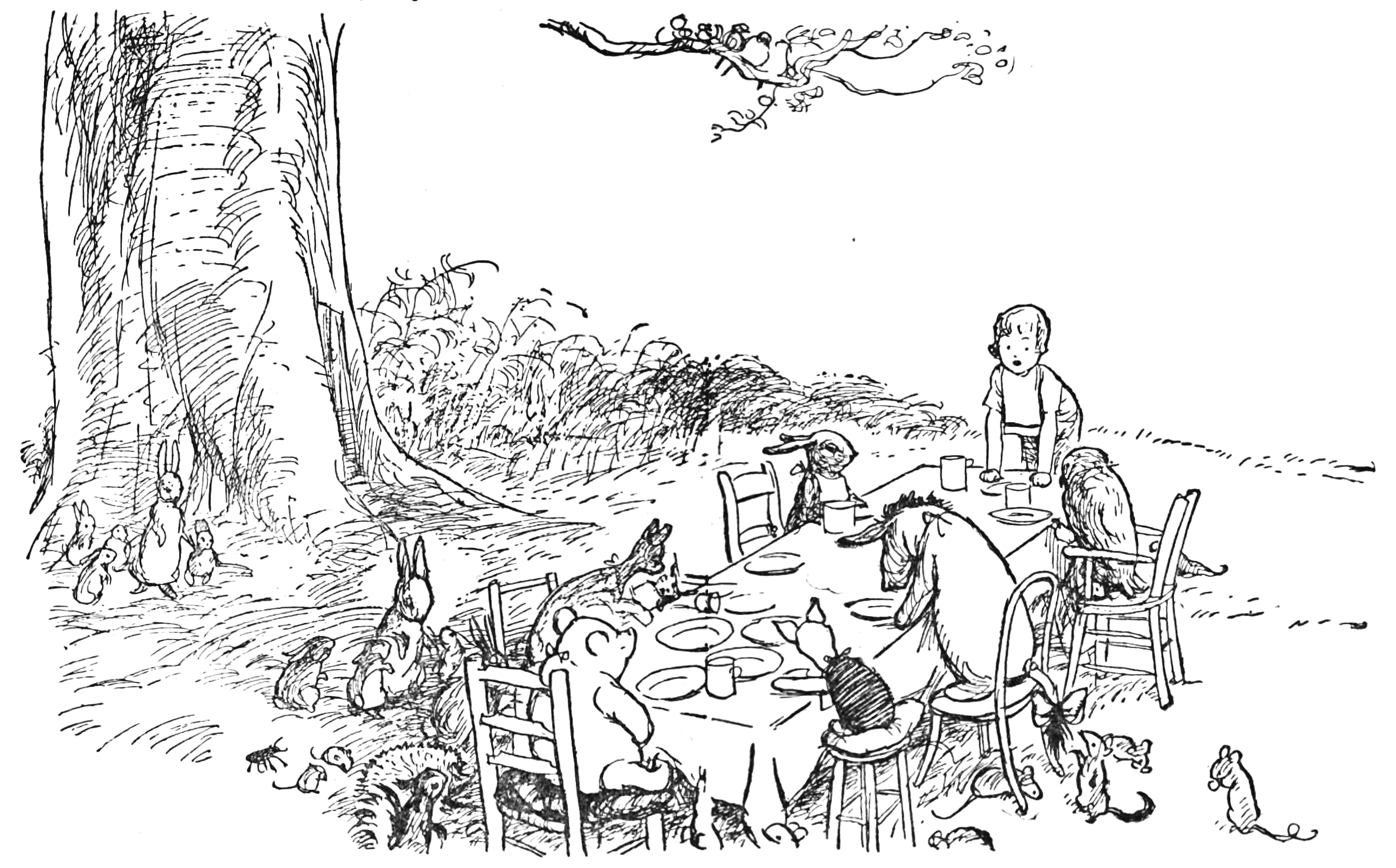
Characters from the original book from Chapter X.

== Characters from the original books ==
=== Winnie-the-Pooh ===
Winnie-the-Pooh, Pooh Bear or Pooh for short (voiced by Sterling Holloway in 1966–1977, Hal Smith in 1979–1989 and Jim Cummings in 1988–present), is an anthropomorphic, soft-voiced teddy bear. Despite being naïve and slow-witted, he is a friendly, thoughtful and sometimes insightful character who is always willing to help his friends and try his best. A prime motivation is his love for honey, which quite often leads to trouble.

In the books, Winnie the Pooh is a talented poet, and the stories are frequently punctuated by his poems and "hums".

He is humble about his slow-wittedness, but comfortable with his gifts.

Winnie-the-Pooh

Cottleston, Cottleston, Cottleston Pie, A fish can’t whistle and neither can I. Ask me a riddle and I reply: “Cottleston, Cottleston, Cottleston Pie.”

— A. A. Milne, Chapter VI, In Which Eeyore Has a Birthday and Gets Two Presents

In the Disney adaptations, in which the character's name lacks hyphens, Pooh has a soft voice, wears a red shirt and his catchphrases are "Oh, bother!" and "Think, think, think". Cummings reprised his role for the Christopher Robin film.

=== Piglet ===
Piglet (voiced by John Fiedler in 1968–2005, Robie Lester in Disneyland Records, Phil Baron in 1983–1986, Travis Oates in 2005–present, and Nick Mohamed in Christopher Robin) is a domestic pig and Pooh's best friend besides Christopher Robin. In the books, he often takes his lead from Pooh unless overcome by fear which occurs more often than not. But increasingly through the stories he shows himself to be very brave when faced with a crisis and given sufficient encouragement (usually by Pooh). He is fond of "haycorns". Piglet moves in with Pooh after giving his house to Owl.

In the Disney series he is kind, gentle and ordinarily quite shy, but with Pooh by his side, he often overcomes his fears.

=== Tigger ===
Tigger (voiced by Paul Winchell in 1968–1999, Sam Edwards in Disneyland Records, Will Ryan in 1983–1986, and Jim Cummings in 1989–present) is Pooh and Piglet's happy, annoying, crazy, less-than-responsible and sometimes troublemaking bengal tiger friend. He bounces around and will often bounce on others. He is full of energy, outgoing, and likes to have fun. Tigger moves in with Kanga and Roo in the books, but lives on his own in Disney adaptations.

In the Disney films Tigger has a tendency to commonly mispronounces words, like "ridickerus" (ridiculous) and usually he causes chaos rather than good. However, Tigger is also shown to be tough, fearless, optimistic and resourceful; he is shown to be protective of Roo when Kanga isn't literally around. Tigger prides himself on being the only one and bouncing as exhibited in the song "The Wonderful Thing About Tiggers". Cummings reprised his role for the Christopher Robin film.

=== Eeyore ===
Eeyore (voiced by Ralph Wright in 1966–1983, Thurl Ravenscroft in Disneyland Records, Ron Feinberg in 1981, Ron Gans in 1983–1986, Peter Cullen in 1988–2017), Bud Luckey in the 2011 film, Brad Garrett in 2018 and Jim Meskimen in 2023) is Pooh's ever-glum, pessimistic and sarcastic domestic donkey friend who is a supporting character. Eeyore has trouble keeping his tail attached to his bottom since the nail keeps falling out. Eeyore has a house made of sticks in the gloomy part of the forest. Eeyore enjoys eating thistles.

In the Disney cartoons, Eeyore is slow-talking and more cautious than some of the other animals and is often reluctant to go along with their actions, but usually does not bother trying to oppose anyone. Generally, Eeyore is more positive and happier in the Disney versions compared to the books. His catchphrase is "Thanks for noticing" as indicated to himself. Eeyore's house often falls apart or gets knocked down in the Disney works.

=== Kanga ===
Kanga (voiced by Barbara Luddy in 1966–1977, Robie Lester in Disneyland Records, Julie McWhirter in 1983, Patricia Parris in 1988–1997, Tress MacNeille in 1994–2006, Kath Soucie in 2000–2010, Kristen Anderson-Lopez in the 2011 film, and Sophie Okonedo in Christopher Robin) is a female red kangaroo and the mother of Roo. The two live in a house near the Sandy Pit in the northwestern part of the forest. Kanga is the only female character to appear in the books and in most Winnie-the-Pooh media. She was based on a stuffed toy that belonged to Christopher Robin Milne.

Kanga is kindhearted, calm, patient and docile. She likes to keep things clean and organised and offers motherly advice and food to anyone who asks her. She is protective over Roo, almost obsessively, and treats him with kind words and gentle discipline. She also has a sense of humour, as revealed in chapter seven of Winnie-the-Pooh when Rabbit connives to kidnap Roo, leaving Piglet in his place; Kanga pretends not to notice that Piglet is not Roo and proceeds to give him Roo's usual bath, much to Piglet's dismay. These events were adapted into animated form in a scene from Piglet's Big Movie (2003).

In the Disney adaptations, Kanga's personality is unchanged (though she is much more sensible and down to earth, and gives Roo some level of independence), but she plays a slightly lesser role and does not appear nearly as often as Roo does. Additionally, Tigger lives in his own house instead of with Kanga (although he is seen frequently visiting her house).

=== Roo ===
Roo (voiced by Clint Howard in 1966–1977, Robie Lester in Disneyland Records, Dori Whitaker in 1974, Dick Billingsley in 1983, Kim Christianson in 1983–1986, Nicholas Melody in 1988–1990, Nikita Hopkins in 1998–2005, Jimmy Bennett in 2004–2006, Max Burkholder in 2007–2010, Wyatt Hall in 2011, Aidan McGraw in 2019, and Sara Sheen in Christopher Robin) is Kanga's cheerful, playful, energetic son, who moved to the Forest with her. In the books, Roo is depicted a tiny animal full of energy and is the youngest character of the main group.

When Kanga and Roo first come to the forest in chapter seven of Winnie-the-Pooh, everyone thinks Kanga is a fierce animal but discover this to be untrue and become friends with her. In the books, when Tigger comes to the forest, she welcomes him into her home, attempts to find him food he likes and allows him to live with her and Roo. After this, Kanga treats him much the way she does her own son.

In the Disney works, Roo is depicted as a young child who often wants to be independent. He has a close bond with Tigger, and he later becomes close with Lumpy, a young Heffalump.

=== Rabbit ===
Rabbit (voiced by Junius Matthews in 1965–1977, Robie Lester in A Happy Birthday Party with Winnie the Pooh, Dallas McKennon in Disneyland Records, Ray Erlenborn in 1981, Will Ryan in 1983–1986, Ken Sansom in 1988–2010, Tom Kenny in 2011–present, and Peter Capaldi in Christopher Robin) is one of the characters not based on a toy once owned by Christopher Robin Milne. He was said to be based on a real rabbit where they lived. He is friendly, yet capable of being impatient and irritable. He considers himself the smartest animal in the Forest. He insists on doing things his way and is obsessed with rules, planning and order. He often bosses others around, but deep down, he cares a lot about his friends. Rabbit is able to read, unlike the other animals.

In the Disney films, he takes pride in his garden and hates it when the other characters disrupt it.

=== Owl ===
Owl (voiced by Hal Smith in 1966–1991, Junius Matthews in A Happy Birthday Party for Winnie the Pooh, Sam Edwards in Disneyland Records, Andre Stojka in 1997–2007, Craig Ferguson in 2011–present, and Toby Jones in Christopher Robin) is the stuffy and talkative eldest main character who presents himself as a mentor and a school teacher to the others. He was not based on a stuffed toy, so in the illustrations he looks more like a live creature.

In the books, Owl has a superior but kindly manner towards the others. He often gets quite cross and easily annoyed, especially when his friends ignore or interrupt his long-winded speeches. He sometimes wears reading glasses, and uses his talons for hands, as opposed to his wings in the Disney version. He lives in a tree known as The Chestnuts, described as an "old world residence of great charm". The house is blown down by a storm in the eighth chapter of The House at Pooh Corner. Eeyore eventually discovers a new house for Owl, but it turns out to actually be Piglet's house. Nonetheless, Piglet offers the house to Owl, who calls his new home "The Wolery". Owl likes to present himself as very knowledgeable, and is perceived by the other animals as such, but like most of the other characters, he does not spell very well; he even spells his own name "Wol". When Rabbit (who is quite literate) comes to Owl to discuss a notice that Christopher Robin has left, Owl cannot even read the notice. But rather than admit this, Owl anxiously bluffs his way through the conversation until he finally tricks Rabbit into reading the notice out loud, at which point Owl resumes his wise demeanor as if he had known all along what it had said.

In the Disney adaptations, Owl is much more jovial and friendly. He enjoys telling stories about his relatives whenever a situation reminds him of one, but many of his stories are pointless or absurd. In Welcome to Pooh Corner, Owl always wears glasses (and often a cap and goggles when flying) and loves to cook. He is absent in My Friends Tigger & Pooh completely.

=== Christopher Robin ===
The primary human character in the books, he has a "cheerful" and compassionate personality and is someone whom Pooh and the others look up to. Despite being a child, he is much wiser and more mature than many of the other characters. Pooh considers both Christopher Robin and Piglet to be his best friends.

Christopher Robin matures considerably over the course of the books. Some chapters in The House at Pooh Corner cover Christopher Robin beginning to go to school and his increasing book-learning. In the final chapter, Christopher Robin leaves his stuffed animals behind and asks Pooh to understand and to always remember him.

In the Disney adaptations, he goes to day school. As in the books, he is best friends with both Piglet and Pooh, and he and Pooh always do nothing together. Christopher Robin has had many voice actors over the years including Bruce Reitherman (1965–1966), Robie Lester (A Happy Birthday Party with Winnie the Pooh), Jon Walmsley (1967–1968), Ginny Tyler (Disneyland Records), Timothy Turner (1974), Kim Christianson (1981–1983), Tim Hoskins (1988–1991), Edan Gross (1991), Brady Bluhm (1997–2000), Tom Attenborough (2000), Tom Wheatley (2003–2005), William Green (2002), Paul Tiesler (2001–2003), Struan Erlenborn (2007–2010), Jack Boulter (2011), and Oliver Bell (2017). Christopher Robin starred in his own film, portrayed by Ewan McGregor as an adult and Orton O'Brien a child (2018).

== Minor characters in the books ==
=== Bees ===
A swarm of honeybees makes their debut in the very first chapter. They live in the hive where Pooh tries to get his honey.

They frequently appear in virtually every version of the Disney adaptations, including the debut short, Winnie the Pooh and the Honey Tree. Whenever Pooh and his friends encounter the bees, trouble usually occurs with the bees going after them.

=== Rabbit's friends and relations ===
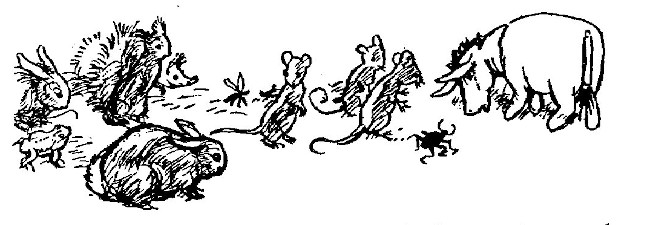
Eeyore with Rabbit's friends and relations from Chapter VIII of Winnie-the-Pooh

Many small mammals and insects in the books are collectively known as Rabbit's Friends and Relations. They do not generally do much or have much character development, and only a few of them are named.

- Christopher Robin with Alexander Beetle from Now We Are Six
  Alexander Beetle is briefly mentioned on page 119 of Winnie-the-Pooh, and he appears to have become upset and hidden himself in a crack for two days, then went to live with his aunt. He is also the subject of a poem in Now We Are Six.
- Small (short for Very Small Beetle) is the subject of a search that Rabbit organises to find him. Making his animated debut in My Friends Tigger & Pooh, he is the first new Milne character to appear in the Disney adaptations since the debut of Tigger in Winnie the Pooh and the Blustery Day.
- Henry Rush is a beetle. He had a brief mention in The House at Pooh Corner, and has been expanded in Return to the Hundred Acre Wood. He attended the Spelling Bee, kept score at the cricket game, and danced at the Harvest Festival.
- Late and Early are two friends mentioned briefly at the end of The House at Pooh Corner and expanded in Return to the Hundred Acre Wood. They attended Christopher Robin's coming home party and received sugar mice. They also attended the Spelling Bee. Although it is never mentioned what species they are, illustrations point to them being mice.
- Smallest-of-All, or S. of A. for short, is mentioned near the end of The House at Pooh Corner and near the beginning of Return to the Hundred Acre Wood. He has a tendency to be unsure of what he sees. His species is never revealed.
- Rabbit's family appears alongside Rabbit in the books. Many relatives appear in The New Adventures of Winnie the Pooh episode "Party Poohper" and he occasionally mentions them at other times in the Disney adaptations. Rabbit's friends and relations were also planned to be side characters in Winnie the Pooh, but they were scrapped from the final film.

=== Heffalumps ===
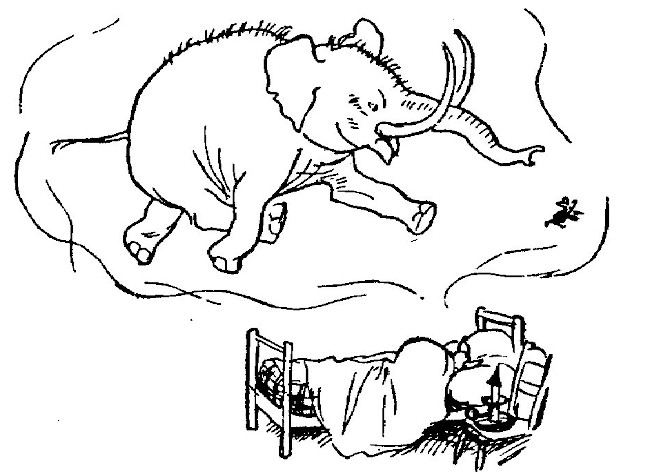
Piglet dreams of a Heffalump in Chapter III of Winnie-the-Pooh

Heffalumps are elephant-like creatures first mentioned in the fifth chapter of the first book and in the third chapter of the second. In the books, Piglet twice has a run-in with a Heffalump that is only a figment of his imagination. The Disney version establishes them as real creatures. Like Pooh imagined in the books, Heffalumps are fond of honey and like to take it for themselves. There have been several real Heffalump characters in the Disney version. Some Heffalumps are villainous creatures and some are genuinely good. Lumpy the heffalump is Roo's good friend, appearing in Pooh's Heffalump Movie and My Friends Tigger & Pooh. Most Heffalumps appeared in the video game series.

=== Woozles ===
A Woozle is a weasel-like creature imagined by the characters in the third and ninth chapters of Winnie-the-Pooh. No Woozles actually appear in A. A. Milne's original stories, but the book depicts them as living in cold, snowy places. They are first mentioned when Pooh and Piglet attempt to capture one, which they assume made the tracks in the snow going around a larch spinney. The more the two friends follow the spoor, the more sets of tracks they find, but Christopher Robin shows them that the tracks around the spinney are their own.

Woozles appear in the song "Heffalumps and Woozles" in Winnie the Pooh and the Blustery Day and later The Many Adventures of Winnie the Pooh, which establishes their fondness for stealing honey and their association with Heffalumps. In The New Adventures of Winnie the Pooh, Woozles are real creatures. A Woozle named Stan and his sidekick Heff the Heffalump are recurring villains. They once recruited a giant Woozle named Wooster (also voiced by Jim Cummings) who turned against them when Pooh and his friends taught him the value of friendship. Woozles do not appear in the Disney adaptations nearly as often as Heffalumps do and, unlike Heffalumps, always attempt to act as villains, with Wooster being the only one to change his mind on this. Like Heffalumps, most Woozles appeared in the video game series.

Woozle Hill on Galindez Island was named for the creatures.

In March 2024, shortly after Winnie-the-Pooh: Blood and Honey 2 was released, it was announced that Winnie-the-Pooh: Blood and Honey 3 – The Lost Years had entered development. The film will have a larger budget than its predecessors and will feature Rabbit, the Heffalumps and the Woozles.

=== Jagulars ===
Jagulars are imagined jaguar-like fierce creatures that are only mentioned in the fourth chapter of The House at Pooh Corner, in which Pooh and Piglet mistake Tigger for one. According to Pooh, they always yell "Help" (or "Halloo" in Winnie the Pooh and Tigger Too!), hang in trees, and drop on you when you look up. Jagulars have yet to actually appear in any Disney adaptations. Their most prominent role to date is in The New Adventures of Winnie the Pooh where they are mentioned more often and are the main antagonists in some episodes. They also have some minor appearances in the video game series.

=== The Backson ===
The Backson is a giant creature imagined by Owl after misunderstanding Christopher Robin's note, which meant he would be "back soon" from school. He is mentioned but not seen in The House at Pooh Corner as "the Spotted or Herbaceous Backson".

In the 2011 animated film Winnie the Pooh, the Backson appears as a false sole main antagonist. He has a significant role, where the animals think he has captured Christopher Robin. Owl describes him as a large, ugly, creepy, mean and scary purple and blue creature who ruins or destroys many everyday items, such as books, socks and crayons. Pooh and his friends build a trap to try to capture him (a pit with a trail of books, socks, dishes, toys and other items leading to it), but Christopher Robin reveals that he was never captured, just away at school. In a post-credits scene of the film, the Backson turns out to be real, but he is a kind and helpful creature who wants to return people's things to them. However, as he picks up all the items, intending to return them to their owners, the Backson falls into the pit. The Backson is voiced by the late Huell Howser.

=== Bad Sir Brian Botany ===
The protagonist of a lengthy poem in When We Were Very Young, this medieval knight "had a battleaxe with great big knobs on, [and] went among the villagers and blipped them on the head." Sir Brian, who calls himself "bold as a lion," continues his armored reign of mayhem over several pages until his fellow citizens get even by hiding his weapons, pushing him into a pond, and roughhousing with him until he is humbled.

While Sir Brian made only this solitary appearance in Milne's works, he was revived for the Disney Winnie the Pooh franchise, where he appears as a resident of the Hundred Acre Wood in 1970s and 1980s comics and children's books. Cheerful and blustery, the Disney version of Sir Brian lives in a small one-room castle made of brick with a "Yield" traffic sign mounted over the entranceway. Despite Sir Brian's advanced age, he is visibly shorter than Christopher Robin, perhaps implying that like many other Pooh characters, he represents a toy figure of some kind.

Disney's Sir Brian occasionally references the events of his source poem, but is generally kept busy arranging duels with—or chasing, or being outsmarted by—Dragon, his wise-guy rival who also lives in the Hundred Acre Wood.

=== Uncle Robert ===
Uncle Robert was Owl's uncle, whose portrait hangs on Owl's wall. He is mentioned in the eighth chapter of The House at Pooh Corner, but never actually appears. His portrait appears in Winnie the Pooh and a Day for Eeyore when Owl says Uncle Robert celebrated his 103rd birthday, despite claiming to be 97. Return to the Hundred Acre Wood reveals that Uncle Robert is dead, but Owl keeps his ashes in a vase and attempts to write his biography.

== Characters in authorised sequels ==
=== Characters in Return to the Hundred Acre Wood ===
- Lottie is a river otter and the only new major character in Return to the Hundred Acre Wood. Lottie is a "feisty" character who is also good at cricket and insists on proper etiquette. She wears a pearl necklace and can play the mouth organ, but is a little snide and snobby in her remarks. She makes her home in a wooden trunk filled with water that she calls Fortitude Hall. According to Benedictus, "Lottie the Otter truly embodies Winnie-the-Pooh's values of friendship and adventure seen throughout Milne's work, thus making her a perfect companion for everyone's favourite bear."
- Grandad Buck is Rabbit's grandfather. He wears glasses and is described as "Very Ancient and the Head of the Rabbit Family". He does not entirely approve of Rabbit, but gives him advice anyway. He knew Owl's late Uncle Robert, who sent him letters.
- A Thesaurus is what Piglet imagines to be a large reptilian creature in a similar way to how the characters imagined Heffalumps and other creatures in the original books. Even after Piglet learns what the word "thesaurus" means, he still imagines it to be an animal.

=== Characters in Winnie-the-Pooh: The Best Bear in All the World ===
- Penguin is introduced in the story "Winter" by Brian Sibley

== Characters in the Disney franchise ==
=== Major characters ===
==== Mr. Narrator ====
The storyteller who speaks off-screen. Sometimes the characters, who are aware that they are in a book, speak with him while facing him. They sometimes affectionately call him "Mr. Narrator". He sometimes uses his position to help the characters, since he can manipulate the book and pages. Some stories, such as Pooh's Grand Adventure: The Search for Christopher Robin have him narrating, but omit the "book" feature, so the characters are unaware of him. Welcome to Pooh Corner is the only time when viewers actually see his face. He has not actually appeared often in The New Adventures of Winnie the Pooh, Piglet's Big Movie, Pooh's Heffalump Movie (in Pooh's Heffalump Movie, Pooh is the narrator), and My Friends Tigger & Pooh. He is the only Disney-only character who returns for Winnie the Pooh. Typically, he speaks with a Southern English accent.

Voiced by Sebastian Cabot, Laurie Main, David Warner, John Rhys-Davies, John Hurt, Roger L. Jackson, David Ogden Stiers, Michael York and John Cleese.

==== Gopher ====
Gopher (voiced by Howard Morris in 1965–1968, Dallas McKennon in Disneyland Records, and Michael Gough in 1988–present) is a fictional gray anthropomorphic bucktoothed gopher character with a habit of whistling out his sibilant consonants that has not made any appearances in any of the books. He often accidentally falls into one of the many holes he makes in the forest ground by forgetting to watch where he is going. Gopher first appears in Winnie the Pooh and the Honey Tree where he says the joke "I'm not in the book", and in Winnie the Pooh and the Blustery Day with a smaller role, warning Pooh about the "Windsday". Gopher later appears as a prominent character in the TV series The New Adventures of Winnie the Pooh, and in the specials A Winnie the Pooh Thanksgiving, Winnie the Pooh: A Valentine for You and Boo to You Too! Winnie the Pooh. The latter was included as part of Pooh's Heffalump Halloween Movie, being his last appearance in animation to date. Gopher was notably absent from the 2011 film and the live-action film. After 13 years of absence, Gopher appears in Kingdom Hearts III in the 100 Acre Wood world (also previously having appeared in Kingdom Hearts II).

==== Dragon ====
This wise-guy purple dragon was introduced in Disney's Winnie the Pooh comic strip in 1977 and went on to feature in children's books and comic books throughout the 1970s and 1980s, most often together with Bad Sir Brian Botany (see above). While perhaps loosely inspired by the poem "Us Two" in Milne's Now We Are Six—in which Pooh and Christopher Robin chase geese while pretending they are dragons—the Disney comics Dragon is an actual dragon, a friendly anthropomorphic wise guy who lives in a small cave in the Hundred Acre Wood.

Dragon's wise-guy image is also conveyed by his vaudeville-style derby hat and vest; in comic strips, he tends to be followed by small puffs of smoke that suggest a comedian smoking a cigar, though the smoke is of course from Dragon's own fiery breath.

Dragon is no larger than the taller residents of the Wood, ensuring that he is never seen as dangerous by anyone except, occasionally, Sir Brian.

Despite Dragon's prominence in the 1980s Disney franchise, he and Sir Brian were never animated and disappeared permanently when Disney's Pooh TV animation began.

==== Kessie ====
Kessie (voiced by Laura Mooney, Amber Hood, and Stephanie D'Abruzzo) is an orphaned eastern bluebird with a white belly/stomach. She debuted in The New Adventures of Winnie the Pooh episode "Find Her, Keep Her". Kessie is cheerful, brave and eager to prove herself. As a nestling, Rabbit adopted her after he saved her from a snowstorm and she came to live with him and nicknamed him "Rabbie". Rabbit was very protective of her and initially did not want her to fly. After she finally learned to fly, she migrated south for the winter, despite a reluctant Rabbit, but returned in "A Bird in the Hand", where she has since matured into a young adult bird. In later appearances, she has reverted to being a juvenile bird. After appearing in Seasons of Giving, Kessie was relaunched as a main character in The Book of Pooh, her first regular role, though after the series, Kessie is never seen or mentioned again.

==== Lumpy ====
Heffridge Trumpler Brompet "Lumpy" Heffalump IV (voiced by Kyle Stanger in the films, and by Oliver Dillon in My Friends Tigger & Pooh) is a young British-accented lavender Heffalump with a tuft of purple hair on his head, a furry bobble-tail and is Roo's closest best friend. He lives in a part of the forest called Heffalump Hollow with his mother. He has a stuffed alligator named Alvin and enjoys a snack called rumpledoodles. Lumpy debuts in Pooh's Heffalump Movie. The characters were initially afraid of Heffalumps and set out to capture one. Likewise, Lumpy's mother told him not to leave Heffalump Hollow because of scary creatures outside of it. After Roo "captured" Lumpy, they became best friends and were not afraid of each other anymore. Lumpy also appears in Pooh's Heffalump Halloween Movie, My Friends Tigger & Pooh, and Kingdom Hearts III.

==== Mama Heffalump ====
Mama Heffalump (voiced by Brenda Blethyn) is Lumpy's mother and the biggest resident of the Hundred Acre Wood. She first appears in Pooh's Heffalump Movie saving Roo from being trapped in a pile of logs, and later appears in episodes of My Friends Tigger & Pooh.

=== Darby ===
Darby (voiced by Chloë Grace Moretz in the US version and Kimberlea Berg in the UK version) is a 6-year-old feisty, imaginative and redheaded girl who is the hostess of My Friends Tigger & Pooh. According to the episode "Christopher Froggin" reveals that she is Christopher Robin's best friend. She is the leader of the problem-solving Super Sleuths along with Tigger, Pooh and her pet puppy Buster. They are the only four characters to appear in every episode. Darby is brave, inquisitive, clever and imaginative. Her catchphrases are "Time to slap my cap" and "Good sleuthin', everyone!" For the most part, she replaced Christopher Robin, who only appeared in two episodes of My Friends Tigger & Pooh.

==== Buster ====
Buster (vocal effects provided by Dee Bradley Baker) is Darby's beloved and curious pet puppy dog and sidekick in My Friends Tigger & Pooh. He is white and wears a red collar with a gold name tag. He appears in every episode and is a member of the Super Sleuths. Though he often seems to be only tagging along with the group, he is often a valuable asset in their work. Buster likes to yap loudly when he is excited or on the scent of something.

==== Evelyn Robin ====
Evelyn Robin (portrayed by Hayley Atwell) is a major character in Disney's 2018 feature film Christopher Robin. She is married to Christopher Robin and the mother of Madeline Robin. She is often worried about her husband's workaholic tendencies because it means that he spends less time with his family and other wishes her husband would be sillier and more fun-loving and spend more time with her and Madeline. She discovers that Winnie the Pooh and the other stuffed animals of the Hundred Acre Wood residents are alive.

==== Madeline Robin ====
Madeline Robin (portrayed by Bronte Carmichael) is a major character in Disney's 2018 feature film Christopher Robin. She is the daughter of Christopher and Evelyn Robin. Much like Christopher was at her age, Madeline is kind, friendly, and brave. Madeline is worried about her father's workaholic tendencies since it means he spends less time with her. She is one of the few people besides Christopher that knows Winnie the Pooh and the rest of the Hundred Acre Wood residents are alive.

=== Recurring and minor characters in The New Adventures of Winnie the Pooh ===
==== Bugs ====
A swarm of green insects who invade Rabbit's garden in several episodes of The New Adventures of Winnie the Pooh and try to eat his vegetables. They resemble caterpillars, but are much shorter and have only six limbs. The leader wears an old-fashioned bicorne and acts like an army general. They are the main antagonists in Winnie the Pooh and Christmas Too. In "The Bug Stops Here", Roo, Dexter, and Pooh Bear befriend an enormous, yet friendly bug after it was kicked out of its group due to his big appetite for food. He was soon presented as a replacement bug for Christopher Robin's science project after his first one ran away by accident. After he was released, he was welcomed back into the clan by his fellow bugs after Rabbit begrudgingly gave up everything from his garden to satisfy his hunger.

==== Christopher Robin's mother ====
Appearing only in The New Adventures of Winnie the Pooh and in The Book of Pooh: Stories from the Heart, Christopher Robin's mother's face is never shown. She is normally seen from behind, and when the front of her is seen, she is usually seen from the chest down. She enforces the rules on her son, but is usually calm and patient with him and loves him very much. His father is never seen or mentioned. Just like her son, she has light brown hair, and she is the grandmother of Madeline Robin.

Voiced by Patricia Parris and most recently Vicki Kenderes-Eibner. The character also appears near the beginning of the live-action film Christopher Robin, portrayed by Katy Carmichael.

==== Crows ====
A flock of crows appears in several episodes of The New Adventures of Winnie the Pooh trying to steal Rabbit's vegetables. There are commonly three or four of them. A bigger and more fiendish version of the crows appear only in "A Very Very Large Animal" stealing food from a picnic and eating corn in Rabbit's garden. A redesigned version of the crows appears briefly in Tigger's Honey Hunt, Springtime with Roo and Pooh's Heffalump Movie.

==== Dexter ====
Owl's young cousin who wears reading glasses. He appeared in "The Owl in the Family" and "The Bug Stops Here". In the former, his parents Torbet and Ophelia appear, and in the latter, he becomes friends with Roo, who is the same age as him, while Pooh babysits them, and befriends an enormous, yet friendly bug after it was kicked out of its group due to his big appetite for food. He was soon presented as a replacement bug for Christopher Robin's science project after his first one ran away by accident. After he was released, he was welcomed back into the clan by his fellow bugs after Rabbit begrudgingly gave up everything from his garden to satisfy his hunger. He talks in a similar manner to Owl.

Voiced by Hal Smith.

==== Uncle Torbet ====
Owl's great uncle, and Dexter's father. He appeared alongside Aunt Ophelia and Dexter in "Owl in the Family". He and they appeared toward the end of the episode in which he, Dexter, and Aunt Ophelia arrived at Owl's house for the family reunion after receiving the invitations from Pooh via balloon. After Rabbit arrived, he and Dexter watched in horror as Rabbit grabbed Aunt Ophelia's tail feather and she threw Rabbit across the floor, and then Dexter and the family began telling Pooh, Rabbit, and Piglet about their family history such as their Uncle Tucker getting his beak caught in the corn crib.

Voiced by Hal Smith.

==== Aunt Ophelia ====
Owl's aunt, and Dexter's mother. She appeared alongside Uncle Torbet and Dexter in "Owl in the Family". She and they appeared toward the end of the episode in which she, Dexter, and Uncle Torbet arrived at Owl's house for the family reunion after receiving the invitations from Pooh via balloon. After Rabbit arrived, Uncle Torbet and Dexter watched in horror as Rabbit grabbed her tail feather and she threw Rabbit across the floor, and then Dexter and the family began telling Pooh, Rabbit, and Piglet about their family history such as their Uncle Tucker getting his beak caught in the corn crib.

Voiced by Hal Smith.

==== Grandfather Gopher ====
Gopher's grandfather who prefers to "dream" rather than "do". Gopher calls him "Grandpappy". He appears in "To Dream the Impossible Scheme" during the "Pewter Pickaxe" contest that Gopher is desperate to see him win by building an above-ground underground city. He also appears briefly in "Easy Come, Easy Gopher" and is mentioned in "Grown But Not Forgotten".

Voiced by Jim Cummings.

==== Papa, Mama, and Junior Heffalump ====
A benevolent family of Heffalumps who appeared in "There's No Camp Like Home" and "Trap as Trap Can". Piglet was afraid of Heffalumps before they met and became friends. They live in a house made of logs. Junior wants to make his father, who has many implausible allergies, proud of him.

==== The Pack Rats ====
The 3 rodents (all voiced by Jim Cummings) who appear as recurring antagonists. They steal anything they can and leave a walnut in exchange, thinking it as payment. The orange Pack Rat is fat and dimwitted, the brown one is grumpy and complaining, and the gray one is their leader. They debut in "Nothing But the Tooth" where they are more like real villains, but in "The Rats Who Came to Dinner", they turn out to be misunderstood and actually help the characters. However, they always return to their urge to steal. Their third and final appearance is in "Oh, Bottle!"

==== Skippy ====
A very large sheepdog belonging to a neighbor of Christopher Robin's. He appears in "Sorry, Wrong Slusher" and "A Pooh Day Afternoon". He is a nice dog, but sometimes makes trouble for the characters. Piglet is afraid of him (as shown in "Sorry, Wrong Slusher", where he thinks Skippy is the "slusher" that Christopher Robin and the animals are afraid of). Unlike other animal characters, Skippy is not anthropomorphised.

==== Stan and Heff ====
Stan (voiced by Ken Sansom) and Heff (voiced by Chuck McCann) are gangster-like villains who appeared in the episodes "The Great Honey Pot Robbery" and "A Bird in the Hand". They are a Woozle and a Heffalump respectively and try to steal as much honey as they can. Stan is the smarter and more irritable of the two and does most of the scheming, while his dimwitted sidekick Heff provides the muscle. He is also afraid of mice and thinks that Roo is a giant mouse. The two are friends with Wooster, a giant woozle who only appears in "The Great Honey Pot Robbery".

==== Piglies ====
They are a tiny race of creatures who look almost like Piglet. They only appear in "The Piglet Who Would Be King", where they made Piglet their king.

==== Crud ====
The main antagonist of "Cleanliness is Next to Impossible", who seeks to spread messiness everywhere, but he is stopped by Christopher Robin, his toys, and his friends, and is sucked into a vacuum.

==== Smudge ====
He is Crud's henchman, who also ends up being sucked into a vacuum following Crud's defeat.

==== Christopher Robin's Toys ====
Appearing only in "Cleanliness is Next to Impossible". They were enslaved by Crud to help with his plans, but are soon freed and helped Christopher Robin and his friends defeat Crud.

==== Crayons ====
Living crayons who serve as Crud's guards. They don't speak, but are known to scream angrily and fire globs of colours from their heads. They only appear in "Cleanliness is Next to Impossible".

==== Bruno ====
A large wind-up robotic toy monkey who had many gifted talents. He was thought to be a replacement for Pooh's friends, but Christopher Robin explains that he is actually going to give him to a friend. Bruno fails to hear the last part and thinks that he is being abandoned, fleeing into the woods and letting himself wind down as a result. After they find him and explain everything, he happily agrees to go along with the plan and is last seen being wrapped up to be sent away to Christopher Robin's friend.

==== Babysitter ====
An unnamed teenager who only appeared in the episode "Babysitter Blues". She was hired by Christopher Robin's mother to watch over Christopher Robin, but things got complicated due to the messes that he and his friends made. She is later given a second chance and Christopher Robin now listens to her. Like Christopher Robin's mother, her face is not seen, although her smile is briefly shown in the end.

=== Recurring and minor characters in My Friends Tigger & Pooh ===
==== Beaver ====
Beaver (voiced by Jim Cummings) lives in a dam near Poohsticks Bridge. He bears a strong resemblance to Gopher, who does not appear in My Friends Tigger & Pooh. Both are hard working rodents with similar appearances and personalities, although Beaver is a little more easygoing than Gopher.

==== Porcupine ====
Porcupine (voiced by Tara Strong) can play the flute and has a passion for cooking but cannot see without her glasses. She is a close friend with Turtle, who is the only character who can hug her because of her sharp quills. They were pen pals before he came to the forest.

==== Possums ====
Twin possum siblings first appear in "Topsy Turvy Tigger", where they attempt to invite others to their birthday party through use of upside-down drawings. They later appear in "Darby's Im-possum-ible Case", in which the characters are shown meeting them for the first time. They look alike, but have opposite personalities. The boy is zippy and outgoing, while the girl is shy and flees from crowds.

Voiced by Sydney Saylor.

==== Raccoon ====
Raccoon (voiced by Rob Paulsen) first appears in "Darby's Lost and Found" and later makes regular appearances in the series. He is in charge of a junk/fix-it shop. He speaks a bit like a hippie, and is annoyed when Tigger refers to his "mask", which is just part of his fur.

==== Skunk ====
Skunk (voiced by James Arnold Taylor) first appears in "Skunk's Non-Scents". He is initially upset that he cannot produce a skunk's foul odor. After it is revealed why and when skunks spray, he accomplishes it, pleasing himself. In "Beaver Gets Skunked", Beaver is reluctant to accept him due to skunks' reputation, but overcomes his prejudice and they become friends.

==== Squirrels ====
Various unnamed squirrels appear frequently in the Hundred Acre Wood. They usually do not speak. They appear numerous times in My Friends Tigger & Pooh, occasionally playing a role in the plot of an episode, and Buster likes to chase them. Squirrels also appear in The Tigger Movie and Piglet's Big Movie.

==== Turtle ====
Turtle (voiced by Mark Hamill) has been Porcupine's friend and pen pal since before he came to live in the forest. He lives a slow and easy life, moves slowly, and speaks with a southeastern United States accent. Turtle enjoys quiet activities like bird watching or playing checkers with his friends. Because of his shell, he is the only character who can hug Porcupine.

==== Woodpecker ====
Woodpecker (voiced by Dee Bradley Baker) is an absent-minded woodpecker who irritates Rabbit by pecking on his house and talks in a fast, bouncy and high-pitched voice. He even sometimes imitates Rabbit's voice. Although Owl does not appear in the series, Woodpecker does share some characteristics with him.

==== Holly ====
Holly (voiced by Mikaila Baumel) is one of Santa's reindeer, whom the main characters meet in Super Sleuth Christmas Movie. She also appears in "Home for the Holly Days" where she comes for a visit.

==== Santa Claus ====
Although he is mentioned in earlier works, he made his first appearance in Super Sleuth Christmas Movie.

==== Snowmen ====
Sentient snowmen who appear in Super Sleuth Christmas Movie, where they help guide the main characters to the North Pole via a musical number.

==== Springs ====
A bouncing robot built by Rabbit, who only appears in "Tigger Gets Bounced". He is meant to serve as a replacement for Tigger's bouncing after winning a bouncing contest, but goes haywire as a result of Beaver getting him wet. He is eventually stopped and destroyed by Tigger.

=== Recurring characters in the Disney video games ===
==== Scary Trees ====
They are evil sentient trees who frighten or attack anybody they see. They debut in Boo to You Too! Winnie the Pooh where Piglet has a terrifying encounter with two of them while fleeing into the woods. After that, they do not appear for the remainder of the franchise. They do however appear in the video game series, usually serving as obstacles.

==== Talking Door ====
A sentient door who serves as a minor antagonist and obstacle in Piglet's Big Game.

==== Granosorus ====
A large shadow monster who serves as the final boss of Piglet's Big Game.

==== Walking Mirrors ====
Sentient golden mirrors who serve as minor enemies in the Game Boy Advance version of Piglet's Big Game.

== Characters in The Twisted Childhood Universe ==
=== Maria ===
Maria is a human college student and one of the two main protagonists of Winnie-the-Pooh: Blood and Honey. She becomes involved in the events of the Hundred Acre Woods after choosing to spend a weekend in a remote cabin with several friends. Her decision to isolate herself stems from a prior stalking incident that left her emotionally shaken, leading her therapist to recommend time away from her usual environment.

Maria and her friends are targeted by Winnie-the-Pooh and Piglet, who attack the cabin and kill several members of the group. Maria manages to evade the creatures alongside her friend Jessica and later participates in the rescue of Christopher Robin and Charlene from the Crossbreeds' treehouse. Despite multiple attempts to escape the woods, the group is repeatedly confronted by Pooh, whose pursuit results in the deaths of several people, including Jessica. Although Christopher intervenes to protect her, Maria is ultimately captured by Pooh, who kills her despite her pleas for Christopher to flee.

She is portrayed by Maria Taylor.

=== Lexy ===
Lexy is a supporting protagonist in Winnie-the-Pooh: Blood and Honey 2. She first met Christopher Robin during their childhood, attending one of his birthday parties prior to the disappearance of his brother Billy. Unbeknownst to her at the time, Billy was later abducted by Dr. Gallup, leading to his transformation into a violent, monstrous entity.

Years later, Lexy becomes indirectly involved in the renewed attacks carried out by Pooh. While scenes from the first film appear on television, she confirms to Freddie—whom she is caring for—that the events depicted involve Christopher Robin, though she dismisses the film's portrayal as inaccurate. She subsequently asks Christopher to babysit Freddie for several nights.During this period, Lexy and Freddie are targeted by Pooh inside their home. They evade him by hiding and using a toy car to misdirect his movements before escaping the house. Police later investigate the residence but fail to locate Pooh. Lexy contacts Christopher Robin to warn him of the renewed threat and later travels into the forest to find him.

While searching for Christopher, Lexy realizes she is being tracked by Owl and flees deeper into the woods. She eventually locates Christopher as he is being attacked by Pooh and intervenes, preventing him from being strangled. During the confrontation, Lexy is nearly killed when Pooh attempts to force her toward an active chainsaw, but she survives the encounter. Following the death of Billy/Pooh at Christopher's hands, Lexy provides emotional support as he processes the loss of his transformed brother. She and Christopher are later found by police officers, including Helen, and the group departs the area in a police vehicle after the conflict concludes.

She is portrayed by Tallulah Evans.
