= Jim Cummings filmography =

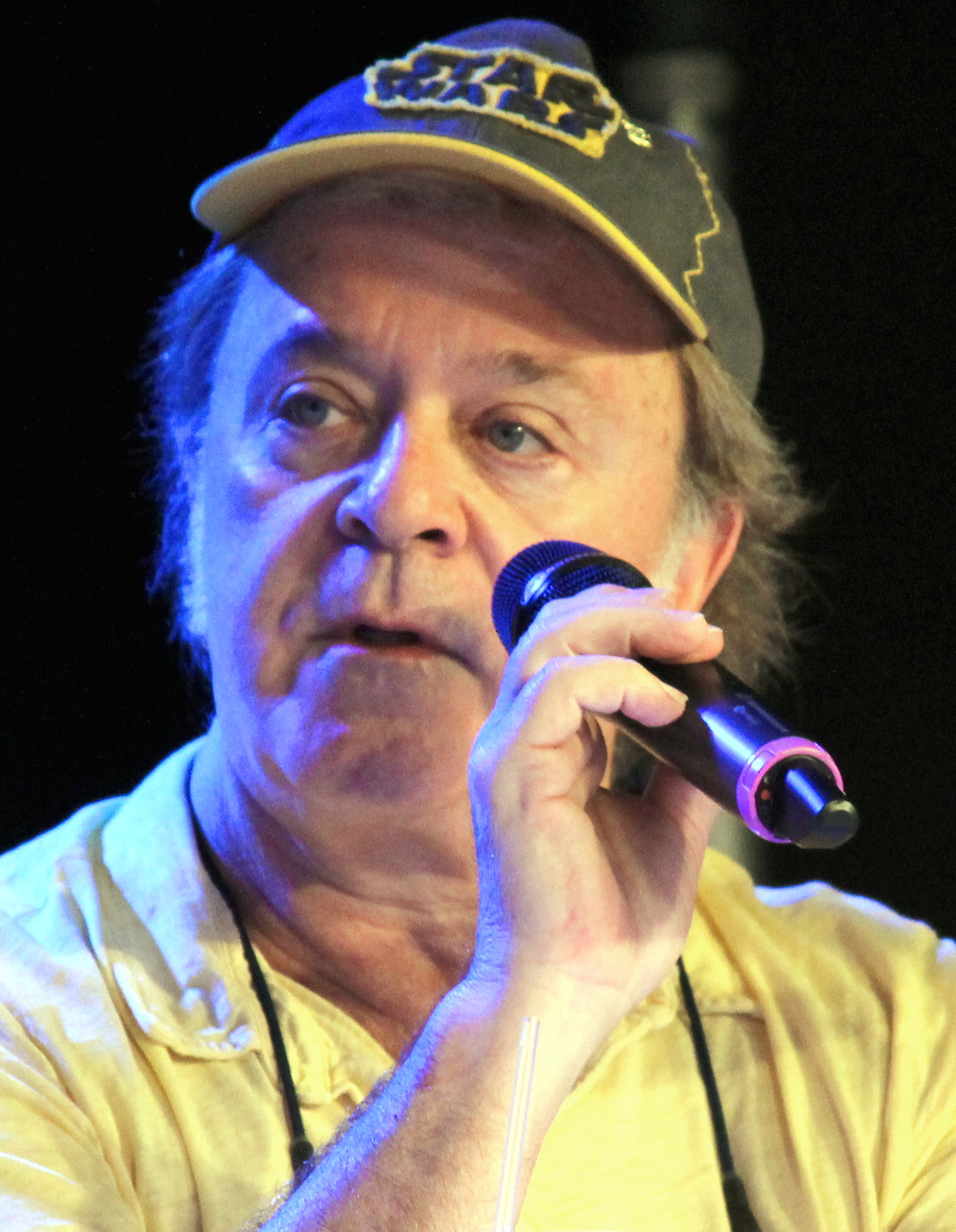
Cummings at MagicCity ComicCon 2015

Jim Cummings is an American voice actor who has appeared in almost 400 roles in films, television and video games.

== Film ==
List of voice performances in feature and direct-to-video films
Year	Title	Role	Notes
1988	Scooby-Doo! and the Reluctant Werewolf	Frankenstein, Skull Head, Snack Bar Manager, Genghis Kong	
1990	Raisins: Sold Out!: The California Raisins II	Narrator	
1990	Cartoon All-Stars to the Rescue	Winnie-the-Pooh, Tigger	
1992	Petal to the Metal	Bonkers D. Bobcat	
1992	Aladdin	Razoul, Farouk	
1992	Pinocchio	Geppetto, Mangiafuoco	Direct-to-video
1994	The Return of Jafar	Razoul, Thief	Direct-to-video
1994	The Lion King	Ed, Gopher, Scar (singing double)	
1994	The Pagemaster	Long John Silver	
1994	Mortal Kombat: The Journey Begins	Shang Tsung, Sub-Zero	Direct-to-video
1995	A Goofy Movie	Pete	
1995	Runaway Brain	Julius	
1995	Pocahontas	Chief Powhatan, Kekata (singing voices)	
1995	Balto	Steele	
1996	Siegfried & Roy: Masters of the Impossible	Additional voices	
1996	Aladdin and the King of Thieves	Razoul	Direct-to-video
1996	All Dogs Go to Heaven 2	Jingles	
1996	The Story of Santa Claus	Mr. Minch	
1996	The Hunchback of Notre Dame	Frollo's Soldiers, Gypsies	
1996	Boo to You Too! Winnie the Pooh	Winnie-the-Pooh, Tigger	
1997	Hercules	Nessus, additional voices	
1997	Redux Riding Hood	Thompkins	
1997	Pooh's Grand Adventure: The Search for Christopher Robin	Winnie-the-Pooh, Skullasaurus, Tigger (singing voice)	Direct-to-video
1997	Beauty and the Beast: The Enchanted Christmas	Additional Voices	Direct-to-video
1997	Anastasia	Rasputin (singing voice)	
1998	Belle's Magical World	Webster	Direct-to-video
1998	The Brave Little Toaster Goes to Mars	Supreme Commander (singing voice)	Direct-to-video
1998	The Lion King II: Simba's Pride	Scar	Direct-to-video
1998	Pocahontas II: Journey to a New World	King James, Chief Powhatan	Direct-to-video
1998	Rusty: A Dog's Tale	Additional Voices	Direct-to-video
1998	Scooby-Doo on Zombie Island	Jacques, Morgan Moonscar	Direct-to-video
1998	Antz	Worker Ant #1	
1998	T.R.A.N.S.I.T	Additional voices	Short film
1998	Buster & Chauncey's Silent Night	Buster	Direct-to-video
1999	The Brave Little Toaster to the Rescue	Sebastian (singing voice)	Direct-to-video
1999	The Nuttiest Nutcracker	Uncle Drosselmeier, Gramps	
1999	Winnie the Pooh: Seasons of Giving	Winnie-the-Pooh, Tigger	
1999	Mickey's Once Upon a Christmas	Pete, Santa Claus, additional voices	Direct-to-video
2000	The Tigger Movie	Tigger, Winnie-the-Pooh	
2000	An Extremely Goofy Movie	Pete	Direct-to-video
2000	The Road to El Dorado	Hernán Cortés, additional voices	
2000	Aladdin and the Adventure of All Time	Additional voices	
2000	Titan A.E.	Chowquin	
2000	Tweety's High-Flying Adventure	Tasmanian Devil, Rocky, Yosemite Sam, Cool Cat, Shropshire Slasher, Casino Cat, Policeman, Additional Voices	Direct-to-video
2000	The Life & Adventures of Santa Claus	Santa Claus	
2000	CatDog and the Great Parent Mystery	Cat	
2000	The Land Before Time VII: The Stone of Cold Fire	Sierra	Direct-to-video
2001	Lady and the Tramp II: Scamp's Adventure	Tony	Direct-to-video
2001	Shrek	Captain of Guards	
2001	Atlantis: The Lost Empire	Helmsman, Smithsonian Board Member #1, Atlantean Ketak Warrior, Atlantean Photographer	
2001	The Book of Pooh: Stories from the Heart	Winnie-the-Pooh, Tigger	Direct-to-video
2001	Monsters, Inc.	Light Green Monster	
2001	Jimmy Neutron: Boy Genius	Ultra Lord, General Abercrombie, Mission Control	
2002	Return to Never Land	Turk	
2002	Tom and Jerry: The Magic Ring	Butch	Direct-to-video
2002	Spirit: Stallion of the Cimarron	Colonel's Soldiers	
2002	The Hunchback of Notre Dame II	Archdeacon	Direct-to-video
2002	Mickey's House of Villains	Big Bad Wolf	Direct-to-video
2002	Winnie the Pooh: A Very Merry Pooh Year	Winnie-the-Pooh, Tigger	Direct-to-video
2002	Treasure Planet	Male Alien	
2003	101 Dalmatians II: Patch's London Adventure	Dirty Dawson	Direct-to-video
2003	The Jungle Book 2	Kaa, Colonel Hathi, M.C. Monkey	
2003	Piglet's Big Movie	Winnie-the-Pooh, Tigger	
2003	Castle in the Sky	General Muoro	English dub
2003	Sinbad: Legend of the Seven Seas	Luca	
2004	The Lion King 1½	Ed The Hyena	Direct-to-video
2004	Winnie the Pooh: Springtime with Roo	Winnie-the-Pooh, Tigger	Direct-to-video
2004	Jimmy Neutron: Win, Lose and Kaboom	Brain #2, Mayor Quadar	
2004	Mickey, Donald, Goofy: The Three Musketeers	Pete	Direct-to-video
2004	The Incredibles	News Reporter	
2004	Mickey's Twice Upon a Christmas	Blitzen	Direct-to-video
2005	Pooh's Heffalump Movie	Winnie-the-Pooh, Tigger	
2005	Pooh's Heffalump Halloween Movie	Winnie-the-Pooh, Tigger	Direct-to-video
2006	Disaster!	Harry Bottoms, Guy Kirk, narrator	
2006	Brother Bear 2	Chilkoot, Bering	Direct-to-video
2006	Bah, Humduck! A Looney Tunes Christmas	Tasmanian Devil, Gossamer	Direct-to-video
2006	The Fox and the Hound 2	Waylon, Floyd	Direct-to-video
2007	Hellboy: Blood and Iron	Tom Manning	Direct-to-video
2007	TMNT	Additional voices	
2007	Bee Movie	Title Narrator and Graduation Announcer	
2007	Super Sleuth Christmas Movie	Winnie-the-Pooh, Tigger	Direct-to-video
2008	The Little Mermaid: Ariel's Beginning	King Triton, Shelbow	Direct-to-video
2008	Dead Space: Downfall	Captain Mathius, Farum	
2008	The Powerpuff Girls Rule!	Fuzzy Lumpkins	Direct-to-video
2008	Turok: Son of Stone	Caveman	
2008	Secrets of the Furious Five	The Instructor	Direct-to-video
2009	My Friends Tigger & Pooh: Tigger & Pooh and a Musical Too	Winnie-the-Pooh, Tigger, Beaver	
2009	Bionicle: The Legend Reborn	Ackar	Direct-to-video
2009	The Princess and the Frog	Ray	
2009	Curious George: A Very Monkey Christmas	Jumpy Squirrel, Chef Pisghetti	
2010	Despicable Me	Man #2	
2011	Gnomeo and Juliet	Featherstone	
2011	The Little Engine That Could	Rusty	Direct-to-video
2011	Winnie the Pooh	Winnie-the-Pooh, Tigger	
2012	Zambezia	Budzo	
2012	Scooby-Doo! Music of the Vampire	Jesper Poubelle, Tulie	Direct-to-video
2012	Wreck-It Ralph	Game Over Voice	Cameo
2012	Sofia the First: Once Upon a Princess	Wormwood	
2013	Curious George Swings Into Spring	Jumpy Squirrel, Mr. Quint	Direct-to-video
2013	Curious George: A Halloween Boo Fest	Jumpy Squirrel, Mr. Quint, Maurice Squirrel	Direct-to-video
2014	The Pirate Fairy	Oppenheimer, Port	Direct-to-video
2014	Tom and Jerry: The Lost Dragon	Kaldorf	Direct-to-video
2015	Minions	Additional voices	Credited as James J. Cummings
2016	The Secret Life of Pets	Additional voices	
2016	Sheep and Wolves	Magra, Klif, Baron	English dub
2016	Sing	Additional voices	Credited as James J. Cummings
2018	Scooby-Doo! and the Gourmet Ghost	Jeremiah Noseworthy, The Red Ghost	Direct-to-video
2025	The King of Kings	Pharisee Hillel, Dismas, James the Greater	

List of voice performances in live-action films
Year	Title	Role	Notes
1987	The Garbage Pail Kids Movie	Greaser Greg, Nat Nerd	
1988	Who Framed Roger Rabbit	Bullet #2	
1994	Cabin Boy	Cupcake	
1998	Small Soldiers	Ocula	
1998	Babe: Pig in the City	Pelican	
2018	Christopher Robin	Winnie-the-Pooh, Tigger	
2021	Space Jam: A New Legacy	Tasmanian Devil (some scenes, uncredited)	
2022	Chip 'n Dale: Rescue Rangers	Pete, Fat Cat, Bootleg Winnie the Pooh, Bootleg Tigger, Shredder's Arm, Darkwing Duck	
2023	Once Upon a Studio	Winnie the Pooh, Baloo	Short film
2026	Coyote vs. Acme	Tasmanian Devil	Cameo

== Television ==
List of voice performances in television shows
Year	Title	Role	Notes
1985–1986	Dumbo's Circus	Lionel the Lion, Aunt Fira	
1986–1991	Adventures of the Gummi Bears	Zummi Gummi, Chummi Gummi	Season 6 only; Zummi was originally voiced by Paul Winchell
1986–1987	The Transformers	Afterburner, Rippersnapper	3 episodes
1987	DuckTales	El Capitan, Notheby's Auctioneer, Quackymodo	5 episodes
1987	The Real Ghostbusters	Doomsday Door, Possessed Subway Train	Episode: "Knock Knock"
1987	Visionaries: Knights of the Magical Light	Witterquick, Bearer of Knowledge, Bogavus, Dwarf, Belizar, Factory Guard, Knight	12 episodes
1987	Pound Puppies	Princefeld, News Reporter	Episode: "Little Big Dog/The Bright Eyes Mob"
1987–1988	Snorks	Additional voices	2 episodes
1987–1996	Teenage Mutant Ninja Turtles	Shredder (1991 and European Vacation Alternate), Leatherhead, Genghis Frog, Dirk Savage, Dirtbag, Merlin, Drakus/Beserko, Doomquest, Captain Krulik	
1988–1991	The New Adventures of Winnie the Pooh	Winnie-the-Pooh, Tigger, Papa Heffalump, Crud, Smug, Bruno, Wooster	
1989–1990	Chip 'n Dale: Rescue Rangers	Monterey Jack (32 episodes), Fat Cat, Professor Nimnul, Wart the Lizard, Rat Capone	Monterey Jack was originally voiced by Peter Cullen
1989–1990	Dink, the Little Dinosaur	Tubble, Fleetfoot	
1990–1991	TaleSpin	Don Karnage, King Louie, Trader Moe, Covington	
1990–1991	Widget	Mega Brain, Dr. Dante	
1990–1992	Tiny Toon Adventures	Chef, Melvin the Monster, Papa Flea, Singer, Iodizer, Nasty	8 episodes
1990–1993	Tom & Jerry Kids	Wrestling Gator, Pirate Captain, additional voices	4 episodes
1991	Where's Wally?	Narrator	13 episodes
1991–1993	The Pirates of Dark Water	Skorian, Ioz	Season 2
1991–1995	Taz-Mania	Tasmanian Devil, Buddy Boar, Bushwhacker Bob, Wendel T. Wolf	
1991–1992	Darkwing Duck	Drake Mallard / Darkwing Duck, Negaduck, Herb Muddlefoot, Professor Moliarty, DarkWarrior Duck, Warden Waddlesworth	
1992–1995	Batman: The Animated Series	Tygrus, Jekko, Saunders	3 episodes
1992–1993	The Addams Family	Lurch	
1992–1993	Wild West C.O.W.-Boys of Moo Mesa	Dakota Dude, Saddlesore Scorpion, Skull Duggery	26 episodes
1992–1996	Captain Planet and the Planeteers	Sly Sludge, Rancher, Columbus	5 episodes
1992	Goof Troop	Pete	
1992	Raw Toonage	Bonkers D. Bobcat, Maurice, Norman	
1992	Adventures of Sonic the Hedgehog	Dr. Robotnik, Scratch, additional voices	Unaired pilot
1992–1994	The Little Mermaid	Ebb, Emperor Sharga, The Ancient Seaclops	
1993	2 Stupid Dogs	Morocco Mole	Season 1 only
1993	Marsupilami	Maurice, Norman	13 episodes
1993–1994	Bonkers	Bonkers D. Bobcat, Lucky Piquel, additional voices	
1993–1994	Sonic the Hedgehog	Dr. Robotnik	
1993–1994	The Pink Panther	Rolo, The Dogfather, additional voices	3 episodes
1993–1994	Cro	Phil, Ogg, Murray	20 episodes
1993–1998	Animaniacs	Narrator, Buddy, Tasmanian Devil, Announcer, various characters	
1993–1995	SWAT Kats: The Radical Squadron	Mayor Manx, Feral's Sergeant, additional voices	Characters originally voiced by Ed Gilbert
1994	Fantastic Four	"Slash" Curtis, "Bull" Donovan, "Skink" Lomas, Bill Clinton	2 episodes
1994–1995	Aladdin	Razoul, Hamar, Akbar, additional voices	
1994–1995	Aaahh!!! Real Monsters	Herb, Guy, Lt. Arm, Host, Monster #3	2 episodes
1994–1995	Bump in the Night	Mister Bumpy, Destructo, Closet Monster	
1994, 1996	The Tick	Mr. Mental	2 episodes
1994–1996	Iron Man	MODOK, Century, Bill Clinton	
1994–1997	Gargoyles	Dingo, Gillecomgain, Matrix, Mr. Acme, Gillecomgain's Father	
1995	Biker Mice from Mars	Deathmaster, Saddle Sore, Gerald Gruyere and Gutama Gouda	2 episodes
1995	Duckman	Dr. Conrad Milo	Episode: "Days of Whining and Neurosis"
1995–1996	Earthworm Jim	Psy-Crow, Bob the Killer Goldfish, additional voices	
1995–1996	The Savage Dragon	Savage Dragon	26 episodes
1995–1996	Monster Mania	Boo Marang, Sootybush	Main role
1995–1997	The Mask: Animated Series	Doyle, Kablamus, additional voices	
1995–1997	What a Cartoon!	Fuzzy Lumpkins, Mayor of Townsville, Fox, Sheriff, Luther, Chief, Explorers, Junior	
1995–1997	Freakazoid!	Semiconductor, Janos Ivnovels, Ape Monster, Wolfman	4 episodes
1995–1998	Spider-Man: The Animated Series	Shocker, Man-Spider	4 episodes
1995–1998	Pinky and the Brain	Punk, The Mist, Fred Floppel, Innkeeper, Saran, Chuck, Orson Welles	8 episodes
1995–1999	Timon & Pumbaa	Ed the hyena, Smolder the Bear, Pumbaa's Uncle Boaris, Bruce the Blue Crab, additional voices	
1995–2002	The Sylvester & Tweety Mysteries	Tasmanian Devil, Gossamer, various characters	27 episodes
1996	Friends	Monkeyshine Beer Announcer	Episode: "The One After the Superbowl" (uncredited)
1996	The Hot Rod Dogs and Cool Car Cats	Scarhood, Crusher	2 episodes
1996	Superman: The Animated Series	Phantom Zone Beast	Episode: "Blasts from the Past"
1996	Quack Pack	Captain Dreadnot, Cal, Henchman #1	6 episodes
1996	Project G.e.e.K.e.R.	Mr. Moloch, additional voices	5 episodes
1996–1997	Dexter's Laboratory	Orgon Grindor	2 episodes
1996–1997	Road Rovers	General Parvo	9 episodes
1996–1998	Jungle Cubs	Kaa, adult Bagheera, adult King Louie, adult Hathi, Fred, Jed, additional voices	
1996–1998	Adventures from the Book of Virtues	Aristotle	
1997	The Incredible Hulk	Absorbing Man	Episode: "They Call Me Mr. Fixit"
1997	Space Goofs	Slick Stagger, Ernie, additional voices	
1997–1998	101 Dalmatians: The Series	Colonel, Mayor Ed Pig, Persian Pete	
1997–1999	Monster Hunters	Alan McAllister	
1997–2000	King of the Hill	Ted "Pops" Popazito, Additional voices	
1997–2000	Pepper Ann	Mr. Carter, additional voices	18 episodes
1998	Invasion America	Major Lomack	13 episodes
1998–1999	The Secret Files of the Spy Dogs	Catastrophe, Von Rabie, Flea Leader, Saber-Toothed Mouse, Bank Robber	11 episodes
1998–2005	CatDog	Cat, additional voices	Main role
1998–2005	The Powerpuff Girls	Fuzzy Lumpkins, various voices	
1999–2000	Mickey Mouse Works	Pete, Humphrey the Bear, Zeke	
1999–2000	Courage the Cowardly Dog	Cat Thief #1, Jean Bon, Fusilli, Cruel Veterinarian	3 episodes
1999–2002	The New Woody Woodpecker Show	Dapper Denver Doodley, Captain Redwood, Oakey, Chef Rufus le Doufus, Dr. Von Brain, Carl Castaway	
2000	Buzz Lightyear of Star Command	Senator Aarrfvox, Security Computer, Tough Prisoner, Alien Dad, Announcer #1, Binipnardian #1	3 episodes
2000	The Simpsons	Duncan the Horse	Episode: "Saddlesore Galactica"
2000	Johnny Bravo	Colonel Fatman	Episode: "Virtual Johnny/Hunted/Hold That Schmoe"
2001	Jackie Chan Adventures	Hak Foo	Episode: "The Dog and Piggy Show"
2001–2002	The Book of Pooh	Winnie the Pooh, Tigger	
2001–2003	House of Mouse	Pete, Humphrey the Bear, Big Bad Wolf, Ed the Hyena, King Larry, Censor Monkeys, additional voices	
2001–2003	The Mummy	Imhotep	24 episodes
2002–2004	ChalkZone	Skrawl, additional voices	
2002–2003	Ozzy & Drix	Police Chief Gluteus, Ernst Strepfinger, Nerve Center Controller, B Complex	
2002, 2005	What's New, Scooby-Doo?	Cyrus T. Buford, Crawdad Mike, Broderick Bosepheus	2 episodes
2003	Lilo & Stitch: The Series	Zach Mackillin, Rodeo Announcer	Episode: "Sprout"
2004–2006	The Adventures of Jimmy Neutron: Boy Genius	Mayor, Atilla the Hun, Captain Betty, Popbot, Gortox	
2004	Teen Titans	Master of Games	Episode: "Winner Take All"
2005	The Batman	Temblor, Vic, Freddy	2 episodes
2005–2006	The Grim Adventures of Billy & Mandy	Nasalmancer, Singer, Nerd #1	2 episodes
2005–2007	Codename: Kids Next Door	Spinachia King, Vin Moosk the Tie Hunter	2 episodes
2006	Catscratch	Klqain Quid	Episode: "Clan Destiny"
2006–2022	Curious George	Chef Pisghetti, Mr. Quint, Jumpy Squirrel	
2006–2016	Mickey Mouse Clubhouse	Pete, Humphrey the Bear, Additional voices	125 episodes
2006–2007	The Replacements	T.S. Fardsworth, Alfred P. Dunleavy, Ring Announcer, Campaign Commercial Announcer	5 episodes
2007–2010	My Friends Tigger & Pooh	Winnie the Pooh, Tigger, Beaver	
2008	The Spectacular Spider-Man	Crusher Hogan	Episode: "Intervention"
2008–2009	Back at the Barnyard	Captain Tom, Chef Big Bones, Polar Bear, Hillbilly #1	4 episodes
2009	Chowder	Alligator	Episode: "My Big Fat Stinky Wedding"
2009	Merry Madagascar	Lead Reindeer	Television film
2009	Robot Chicken	Lex Luthor, Ark Spirit, Doctor	Episode: "Due to Constraints of Time and Budget"
2009–2012	Star Wars: The Clone Wars	Hondo Ohnaka, additional voices	9 episodes
2010–2011	The Super Hero Squad Show	Thanos, Super-Skrull	
2010	Planet Sheen	Ultra Lord	Episode: "Cutting the Ultra-Cord"
2010–2015	The Penguins of Madagascar	Ridiculously Deep Voice, Announcer, Bo, Gomer, Host	4 episodes
2011–2012	Fanboy & Chum Chum	Professor Flan	
2011–2012	Fish Hooks	Scientist, Movie Announcer	2 episodes
2011	Scooby-Doo! Mystery Incorporated	Captain Caveman	Episode: "Mystery Solvers Club State Finals"
2011	Generator Rex	Trey	2 episodes
2011	Kick Buttowski: Suburban Daredevil	TV Announcer	Episode: "Sleepover"
2011–2014	The Looney Tunes Show	Tasmanian Devil, Beaky Buzzard, Additional voices	9 episodes
2012	Adventure Time	Porcupine, Lenny the Beaver, Owl	Episode: "Up a Tree"
2012	Motorcity	Dr. Hudson	2 episodes
2012	ThunderCats	Caspin	Episode: "Native Son"
2012–2018	Sofia the First	Wormwood, Rex, Professor Popov	28 episodes
2012–2013	Kung Fu Panda: Legends of Awesomeness	Lidong, Rhino Guard	3 episodes
2012–2013	The High Fructose Adventures of Annoying Orange	Pineapple, Tomato, Asparagus Bunch, Rotten Tomato, Tennis Ball, The Bries Member #2, Market Grandmaster	35 episodes
2013	The Legend of Korra	Karu, additional voices	4 episodes
2013	Phineas and Ferb	Narrator (Phineas and Ferb: Star Wars), additional voices	
2013	Ben 10: Omniverse	Vexx	Episode: "Food Around the Corner"
2013–2014	Randy Cunningham: 9th Grade Ninja	Catfish Booray	5 episodes
2013–2019	Mickey Mouse	Pete	
2014	Clarence	Additional voices	
2014	The 7D	Roar	Episode: "Frankengloom"
2014	Gravity Falls	Pirate Lilliputtian	Episode: "The Golf War"
2014–2016	Transformers: Rescue Bots	Colonel Quint Quarry, Thurston Chumley, Q-Drone, Ship Captain	3 episodes
2015–2016	The Great Adventures	Mike, Additional voices	
2015–2017	Transformers: Robots in Disguise	Clampdown, Thermidor, Sentry #1	12 episodes
2015–2019	Niko and the Sword of Light	Narrator, Dark Champion, Mugwhump, Mr. Funkfang, Spokesbeetle	23 episodes
2015–2018	The Adventures of Puss in Boots	El Guante Blanco, Two-Eyed Alonso, Briny Pete, Julio	
2015–2018	Star Wars Rebels	Hondo Ohnaka, additional voices	6 episodes
2015–2018	Goldie & Bear	Big Bad Wolf	25 episodes
2016	Pickle and Peanut	Additional voices	Episode: "Bee Colony/The Goose's Juice"
2016–2017	Avengers Assemble	Ghost	2 episodes
2016–2017	Lego Star Wars: The Freemaker Adventures	Hondo Ohnaka, additional voices	2 episodes
2016–2017	Mighty Magiswords	Buford, Matt, Hold Forlom, Face of Barren-Faceland, Pupusa Monster, Mask Keeper, Wolf, Cauldron, Mask Keeper	6 episodes
2016–2019	The Powerpuff Girls	Fuzzy Lumpkins	
2016–2020	New Looney Tunes	Blacque Jacque Shellacque, Liam Luxurious, Tasmanian Devil, Delivery Man, Boss	10 episodes
2017	Doc McStuffins	Winnie the Pooh, Tigger	Episode: "Into the Hundred Acre Wood"
2017	Skylanders Academy	Malefor	2 episodes
2017–2019	OK K.O.! Let's Be Heroes	Lord Boxman, Boxman Jr., Mecha Maw, Mr. Box-Gar	
2017–2019	Spider-Man	Hammerhead, Ghost	6 episodes
2017–2021	Mickey Mouse Mixed-Up Adventures	Pete	
2018	Star Wars Forces of Destiny	Hondo Ohnaka	Episode: "Triplecross"
2018	DuckTales	Darkwing Duck, Negaduck, Paddywhack	4 episodes
2019–2021	Apple & Onion	Broccoli, Watch, Hog	28 episodes
2020	Amphibia	Alligator, Aquarium Security Guard, additional Voices	3 episodes
2020–2023	The Wonderful World of Mickey Mouse	Pete	
2021–2025	Mickey Mouse Funhouse	Pete	
2025	Chibiverse	Darkwing Duck, Fat Cat, Bonkers D. Bobcat	Episode: "Journey to the Center of the Chibiverse"
2025	Big City Greens	The Captain	Episode: "Swashbuckled"
2025–present	Mickey Mouse Clubhouse+	Pete	

== Video games ==
- Disney's Aladdin in Nasira's Revenge – Razoul
- Alpha Protocol – Conrad Marburg, gelato shopkeeper
- Anastasia: Adventures with Pooka and Bartok – Grigori Rasputin
- Animaniacs – Himself, Radio News
- Army Men series – All Voices (sans Females)
- Baldur's Gate Series – Minsc, Firkraag, Gorion, Tazok, Abazigal, Gromnir Il-Khan, Demogorgon
- Blazing Dragons - King Allfire, Chancellor
- Cartoon Network Universe: FusionFall - Fuzzy Lumpkins
- Cartoon Network Racing - Fuzzy Lumpkins
- CatDog: Quest for the Golden Hydrant – Cat
- Clifford the Big Red Dog: Thinking Adventures - Mr. Hamburger, Policeman, Parrot
- Clive Barker's Jericho – Arnold Leach
- Disney's Dinosaur – Bruton
- Dragon Age: Origins – Additional voices
- Epic Mickey – Pete (as Small Pete, Big Bad Pete, Petetronic, & Pete Pan)
- Epic Mickey 2: The Power of Two – Pete (as Small Pete, Big Bad Pete, Pete Pan, & Petetronic)
- Epic Mickey: Power of Illusion – Pete
- Fallout – The Master, Set, Gizmo
- Fallout 4 – The Scribe, Institute Scientist, Mr. Able, Benjamin Beasley, Cedric Hopton, Fisherman, Settlers, Vault 81 Residents
- Fallout 4: Nuka-World – Maurice Turner, Dr. Hein, Nuka-Galaxy Announcer
- Fisher Price: Castle – King Smudge
- Fisher Price: Pirate Ship -
- Grand Theft Auto V – The Local Population
- Guild Wars 2 – Sadizi
- Hades Challenge – Additional voices
- Icewind Dale – Arundel, Hrothgar, additional voices
- Infinity Blade II – Additional voices
- Kinect Disneyland Adventures – Winnie the Pooh, Tigger, Cheshire Cat
- Kingdom Hearts series – Pete, Winnie the Pooh, Tigger, Ed, Cheshire Cat, Julius
- Kingdoms of Amalur: Reckoning – Gadflow & Encel
- Lara Croft and the Guardian of Light – Totec, Lara's Partner, Xolotl
- Lightning Returns: Final Fantasy XIII – Additional Voices
- The Lost Vikings 2 – Olaf the Stout, Tomator.
- Looney Tunes: Acme Arsenal – Tasmanian Devil
- Looney Tunes: Cartoon Conductor – Tasmanian Devil
- Looney Tunes: Wacky World of Sports - Tasmanian Devil, Gossamer
- Marvel Super Hero Squad: The Infinity Gauntlet – Thanos
- Marvel: Ultimate Alliance 2 – Thor, Scorpion
- Mass Effect 2 – Urdnot Wreav, Patriarch, additional voices
- Mickey's Speedway USA – Pete
- Minecraft: Story Mode – Hadrian
- MultiVersus – Tasmanian Devil
- Nickelodeon All-Star Brawl – CatDog (Cat), Shredder (voiceover added in the June 2022 update)
- Nickelodeon All-Star Brawl 2 - Shredder
- Nickelodeon Extreme Tennis - CatDog (Cat)
- Nickelodeon Kart Racers 3: Slime Speedway - CatDog (Cat)
- Nickelodeon Party Blast – CatDog (Cat)
- Nicktoons MLB – Ultra Lord
- OK K.O.! Let's Play Heroes - Lord Boxman
- Orion Burger - Zlarg
- Painkiller – Alastor
- Piglet's Big Game – Winnie the Pooh, Tigger
- Quest for Glory IV: Shadows of Darkness – Boris, Hans
- Reader Rabbit Preschool – Rex the Monster
- Scooby Doo and Looney Tunes: Cartoon Universe – Yosemite Sam, Tasmanian Devil
- Splatterhouse – The Terror Mask
- Spider-Man: Edge of Time – Additional voices
- Spider-Man: Shattered Dimensions – Kraven the Hunter, Norman Osborn/Goblin (consoles and PC), Boomerang, Tinkerer (Nintendo DS)
- Star Wars: The Old Republic – Master Oteg, General Skylast, Commander Bragan
- 1991 – Teenage Mutant Ninja Turtles: Turtles in Time – Leatherhead and Shredder (Arcade version only)
- Teen Titans – Master of Games, Wildebeest
- The Adventures of Jimmy Neutron: Boy Genius: Attack of the Twonkies - Ultra Lord
- The Elder Scrolls V: Skyrim – Elderly Males
- The Elder Scrolls Online – Additional voices
- Tigger's Honey Hunt – Winnie the Pooh, Tigger
- Toonstruck – Feedback, B.B. Wolf, Dough, Snout, Seedy, Warp
- Wacky Races: Starring Dastardly and Muttley – Dick Dastardly
- Walden, a game – Ralph Waldo Emerson
- WildStar – Victor Lazarin, The Sarge, Osiric, Taxi Cab, Commander Kriton, Jarak, Granok Male
- Winnie the Pooh Kindergarten – Winnie the Pooh, Tigger
- Winnie the Pooh Preschool – Winnie the Pooh, Tigger
- Winnie the Pooh's Rumbly Tumbly Adventure – Winnie the Pooh, Tigger
- World of Warcraft: Mists of Pandaria – Narrator of the Pandaren cinematic intro, Shen-zin Su, Wei Palerage, Lorewalker Cho, Doyo’da, Tong the Fixer, Lorewalker Ruolin for the song of Liu Lang
- World of Warcraft: Legion – Havi, Runas the Shamed
- World of Warcraft: Battle for Azeroth – Lorewalker Cho, High Commander Kamses
- World of Warcraft: Shadowlands – Additional voices
- Ys: Book I&II – Dalles

== Audiobooks ==
Year	Title	Role
2015	Rain of the Ghosts	Maq, Big Harry Connors, Joshua Stevens
2019	Pirate's Price	Hondo Ohnaka/Narrator

== Podcasts ==
Year	Title	Role	Notes
2022	Veronica	Paco	
2023–present	Toon'd In with Jim Cummings	Himself/Host	

== Live-action ==
- Comic Book: The Movie – Dr. Cedric Perview
- I Know That Voice – Himself
- Youngstown: Still Standing – Himself/narrator

== Theme park attractions ==
- Fantasmic! at Disney's Hollywood Studios – Scar
- Flight of Fear at Kings Island and Kings Dominion – Narrator and Alien Leader
- T2-3D: Battle Across Time in Universal Studios Theme Parks – Opening Sequence Narrator
- IllumiNations: Reflections of Earth at Epcot in Walt Disney World – Narrator
- Mickey & Minnie's Runaway Railway at Disney's Hollywood Studios in Walt Disney World and Mickey's Toontown in Disneyland – Pete
- Roger Rabbit's Car Toon Spin at Mickey's Toontown in Disneyland and Tokyo Disneyland in Tokyo Disney Resort – Baby Herman
- Millennium Falcon: Smugglers Run at Star Wars: Galaxy's Edge in Disneyland Resort and Walt Disney World Resort – Hondo Ohnaka

== Commercials ==
- United States Forest Service - Smokey Bear (1993–2006)
