= Darkwing Duck (TurboGrafx-16 video game) =

1992 video game

- Developers: Radiance Software; Interactive Designs
- Publishers: Turbo Technologies, Inc.
- Designer: Christopher Riggs
- Programmers: Robert Morgan; Christopher Warner
- Artists: Maureen Kringen; Nancy Nakamoto
- Composer: Rod Nakamoto
- Series: Darkwing Duck
- Platform: TurboGrafx-16
- Release: 1992
- Genre: Action
- Mode: Single player

Darkwing Duck is a video game for the TurboGrafx-16 console based on the animated series Darkwing Duck. It was designed by Interactive Designs and Radiance Software. It was published by Turbo Technologies Inc. in 1992.

== Plot ==
Steelbeak has recruited some of St. Canard's dangerous criminals to help to build an ultimate crime weapon. As a result, S.H.U.S.H. requires the help of Darkwing Duck to stop them. There are few clues, except a picture of the criminals looking at stolen artwork. Darkwing must bring Steelbeak to justice by scouring the city to find jigsaw puzzle pieces that reveal the villain's location.

== Gameplay ==
Darkwing using his primary attack

Players battle enemies while collecting puzzle pieces scattered throughout each of the first three levels. Levels are timed and Darkwing is crushed by a falling safe for prolonged idling.

The player's primary attack is jumping on enemies heads. The player can also use a gas gun, which can only be used when the player has gas pellets as ammunition. Three colors of gas pellets correspond to confusing, sleeping and knock out gases, which describe the effects inflicted on enemies. Cherry bombs can be used to defeat all enemies on the screen and scattered power-ups can be collected for various effects such as increasing remaining lives or granting temporary invulnerability.

== Reception ==
Reception

Review score
Publication	Score
Electronic Gaming Monthly	3/10, 4/10, 3/10, 3/10

The game has received negative reviews from critics. TurboPlay magazine gave the game a rating of 40%. It noted the unimpressive soundtrack and weak graphics, which do not use all the features of the console. GameZone staff criticized the game for its stunning weapon, which they felt did not last long enough to be useful, as well as Darkwing Duck's short jump height. Michael Ayala of Hardcore Gaming 101 agreed with the criticism of the weapon and jump ability, adding that the game suffered from a poor level design and glitches. They felt that the only positive was the sprites when not in motion. Chris Antista of GamesRadar+ similarly felt negative towards the game, calling it "poorly balanced" and its gameplay and music "underwhelming".

== See also ==
- List of Disney video games
- Darkwing Duck (Capcom game)
