= Darkwing Duck (Capcom video game) =

1992 video game

- North American box art
- Developer: Capcom (Note: Ported to Game Boy by Make Software)
- Publisher: Capcom
- Producer: Tokuro Fujiwara
- Composer: Yasuaki Fujita
- Series: Darkwing Duck
- Platforms: Nintendo Entertainment System; Game Boy
- Release: NES; NA: June 5, 1992; EU: December 9, 1993 Game Boy; NA: 1993
- Genre: Platform
- Mode: Single-player

Darkwing Duck is a platform video game developed and published by Capcom for the Nintendo Entertainment System in 1992. It was based on the Disney animated television series Darkwing Duck. It was ported to the Game Boy in 1993.

== Plot ==
A mysterious crime wave has hit St. Canard and S.H.U.S.H. requires the services of the caped crime fighter Darkwing Duck to stop it as it appears that F.O.W.L. and their valued operative Steelbeak is behind the uprising. They have hired six of Darkwing's greatest foes to wreak havoc in different areas throughout St. Canard. Darkwing must subdue each of these criminals in order to find Steelbeak and save the city.

The six hired criminals consist of The Fearsome Five, which are The Liquidator, Megavolt, Dr. Reginald Bushroot, and Quackerjack. Two hired additional hired criminals are Professor Moliarty and Wolfduck, an original character who was created specifically for this game.

== Gameplay ==
NES gameplay. The heart in the top left hand corner is the player's life reserve. The letters under it represent the current gas powerup.

Darkwing Duck is a platform game with a couple of elements similar to Capcom's Mega Man video game series. The gameplay is based on typical platforming while using a Gas Gun to take down enemies. The player may choose from three different stages at the start of the game with another set of three becoming available after that. Once all six stages are clear, Darkwing proceeds to F.O.W.L.'s Floating Fortress for his final confrontation with Steel Beak.

Darkwing begins with his standard Gas Gun but can collect different types of gas throughout each stage: Thunder, Heavy, and Arrow. Each special gas requires ammunition and take up different amounts and functions differently, but the player can only have one type of special gas at a time. Picking up a different type of special gas replaces the one Darkwing currently has. The player can freely switch between the special gas and the standard gas by hitting Select. Darkwing can also deflect certain projectiles with his cape by hitting Up on the control pad.

The Game Boy version contained more stats and scoreboard at the bottom of the screen.

== Release ==
The NES version was released in North America in June 1992, followed by a Game Boy version released in February 1993.

The NES version of the game was included alongside other games in The Disney Afternoon Collection compilation for PC, PlayStation 4, and Xbox One in April 2017, as well as its Nintendo Switch and Switch 2 release in 2026.

A sequel to the game featuring 16-bit styled graphics was pitched to Capcom by Headcannon, one of the developers of Sonic Mania. The pitch was ultimately rejected and Headcannon released their playable prototype online on January 7, 2019.

== Reception ==
Reception

Aggregate score
| Aggregator | Score |
|---|---|
| GameRankings | 71.00% (GB, 1 review) |

Review scores
| Publication | Score |
|---|---|
| Computer and Video Games | 56/100 (GB) |
| GamePro | 4.6/5 (NES) |
| Jeuxvideo.com | 14/20 (NES) |
| Joypad | 92% (GB) |
| Nintendo Power | 3.875/5 (NES) (Note: Nintendo Power scored 3.9/5 three times for graphics/sound, play control, and challenge, and 3.8/5 for theme/fun.) |
| Official Nintendo Magazine | 91% (GB) |
| Total! | 62% (NES) |
| Just Games Retro | 3/5 (NES) |
| Quebec Gamers | 7.8 / 10 (NES) |

Award
| Publication | Award |
|---|---|
| Nominated for Nintendo Power Award '92 | Best Overall Game |

The game has been considered an example of the quality Disney games produced by Capcom. The game was received well by critics.

A reviewer for a Nintendo Magazine System UK noted that the Game Boy version of a game is different from "rest of the potboiler platformers gracing the Gameboy", and is "entertaining and varied". Entertainment Weekly gave the game a B and noted the similarities between the game and the Mega Man series. Nintendo Power ranked Darkwing Duck the third best Game Boy game of 1993.

== Rejected sequel ==
In 2018, Aaron Sparrow, lead writer for The Duck Knight Returns comic, worked alongside Sonic Mania developer Headcannon (as well as its main developer Simon Thomley) and Disney comic artist James Silvani to create a proposal for Capcom to create a sequel to the NES video game Darkwing Duck. Simon had been interested in making a Darkwing Duck video game for a while. They were inspired to an extent by WayForward Technologies' DuckTales: Remastered, a remake of the NES DuckTales video game. Headcannon created a short prototype of the game as part of this, and those involved said they would be attempting to get every member of the TV show's voice cast as they could. Simon asked a Capcom representative about the prospects of a sequel, and in response to what seemed to be interest, they went to work on the project. Further communication did not have results, and they were advised that Disney was likely to turn down the idea regardless. Aaron and Simon went into detail about the proposal in 2019, when the demonstration was released on Headcannon's official website for people to download, though it is shorter due to the rejection.

Darkwing Duck uses pixel graphics, vintage music, and a two-dimensional perspective as well as similar gameplay to the original NES game with only a small number of changes and additions. The game featured a Game Boy Advance-like visual filter. It was meant to be either a spiritual sequel or, if Capcom desired, a remake of the original game in a similar style to DuckTales Remastered. The game would have featured animated art by James as well as fully voiced motion comics in between the stages. It would have taken place between the original TV show and Aaron's comic, featuring Darkwing Duck villains Steelbeak, Taurus Bulba, and the Fearsome Five. The level in the demo is a sewer level.

USGamer writer Matt Kim expressed hope that the video of the proposal would renew interest. Kotaku's Ethan Gach notes that while the demo lacks polish, it has merit. They found the mouse and keyboard controls to be less than ideal and speculated that it may be why Capcom decided to pass on the project. They however felt that the sound and visuals demonstrated a passion for the NES game by the people involved. Writer William Usher was critical of the decision to set the prototype in a sewer and stated that it did not immediately appeal to them as a result, but felt that the prototype was still polished.

== See also ==
- List of Disney video games
- Darkwing Duck (TurboGrafx-16 video game)
