= Jim Cummings =

American voice actor (born 1952)

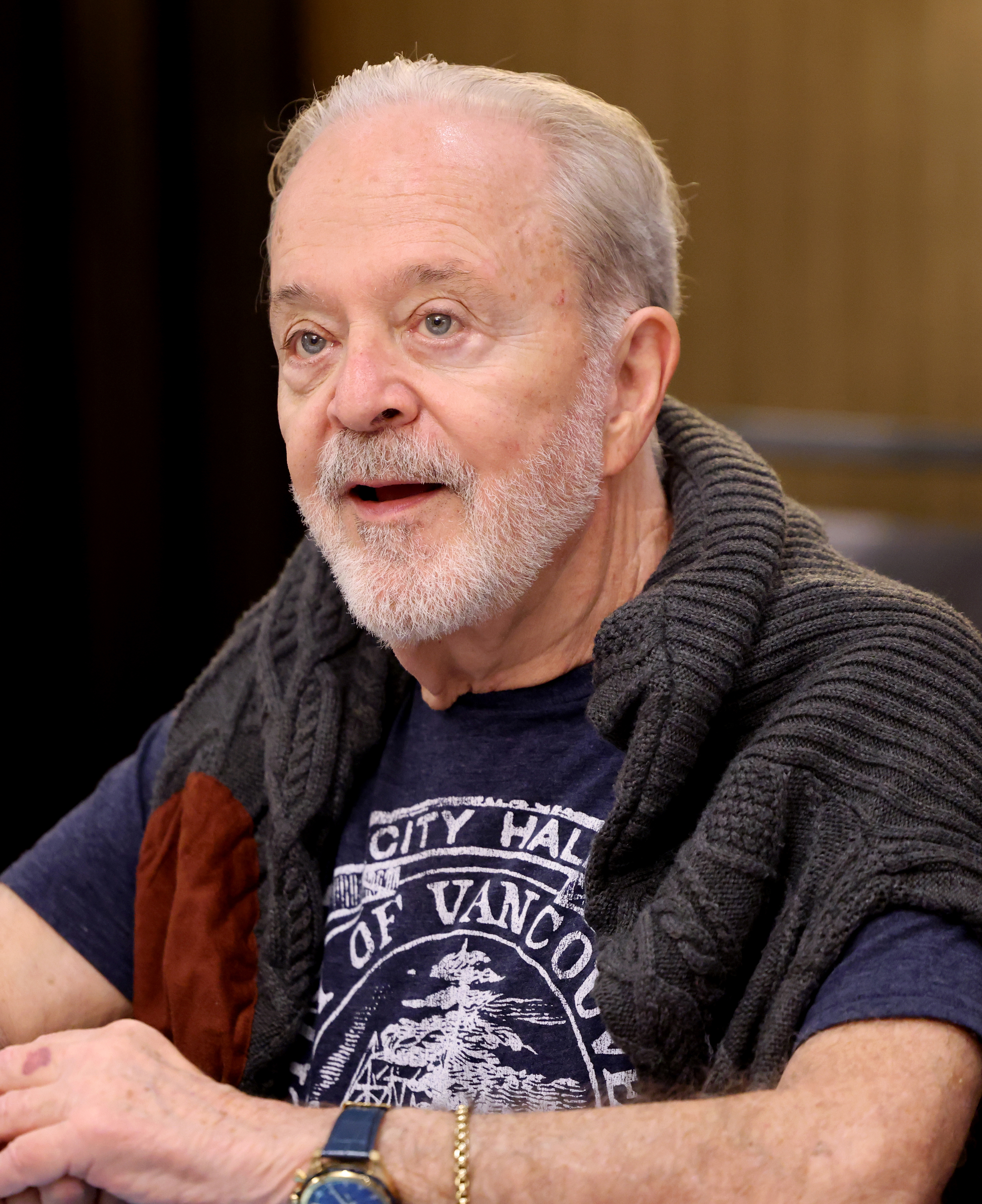
- Cummings in 2025
- Born: James Jonah Cummings; November 3, 1952 (age 74); Youngstown, Ohio, U.S.
- Occupations: Voice actor; podcaster
- Years active: 1984–present
- Works: Full list
- Spouses: Stephanie Jardon (m. 2001; div. 2011); Margaret Judge (m. 2020)
- Children: 4

YouTube information
- Channel: Toon'd In with Jim Cummings
- Years active: 2023–present
- Genre: Voice acting
- Subscribers: 173,000
- Views: 109.1 million
- Last updated: September 20, 2026
- Website: jimcummingsworld.com

James Jonah Cummings (born November 3, 1952) is an American voice actor and podcaster. Beginning his career in the 1980s, he has appeared in more than 600 titles. Cummings has worked with the Walt Disney Company and Warner Bros., serving as the official voice of Winnie the Pooh since 1988, Tigger since 1989, the Tasmanian Devil since 1991, Pete since 1992, King Triton since 2008 and the Cheshire Cat since 2011. Other roles include Fat Cat and Monterey Jack on Chip 'n Dale: Rescue Rangers (1989–1990), the eponymous character on Darkwing Duck (1991–1992), Dr. Ivo Robotnik on Sonic the Hedgehog (1993–1994), Fuzzy Lumpkins in The Powerpuff Girls (1998–2005), Ed in The Lion King (1994) and all other media featuring the character, Steele in Balto (1995), Kaa on Jungle Cubs (1996–1998) and The Jungle Book 2 (2003), Cat on CatDog (1998–2005), Ray in The Princess and the Frog (2009), Hondo Ohnaka in Star Wars: The Clone Wars (2008–2012) and Star Wars Rebels (2015–2018), and The Voice of Tomorrow for the Tomorrowland music festival (2004–2026).

== Early life ==
James Jonah Cummings was born in Youngstown, Ohio, on November 3, 1952. Cummings attended Immaculate Conception and St. Columba grade schools as well as Ursuline High School, from which he graduated in 1970.

Upon his graduation from high school, Cummings relocated to New Orleans, where he designed and painted Mardi Gras floats, worked as a river boat deck hand, and sang and played drums in the regionally-successful rock band Fusion. He later married and moved to Anaheim, California, where he managed a video store in the early 1980s, before launching his voice acting career in late 1984.

== Career ==
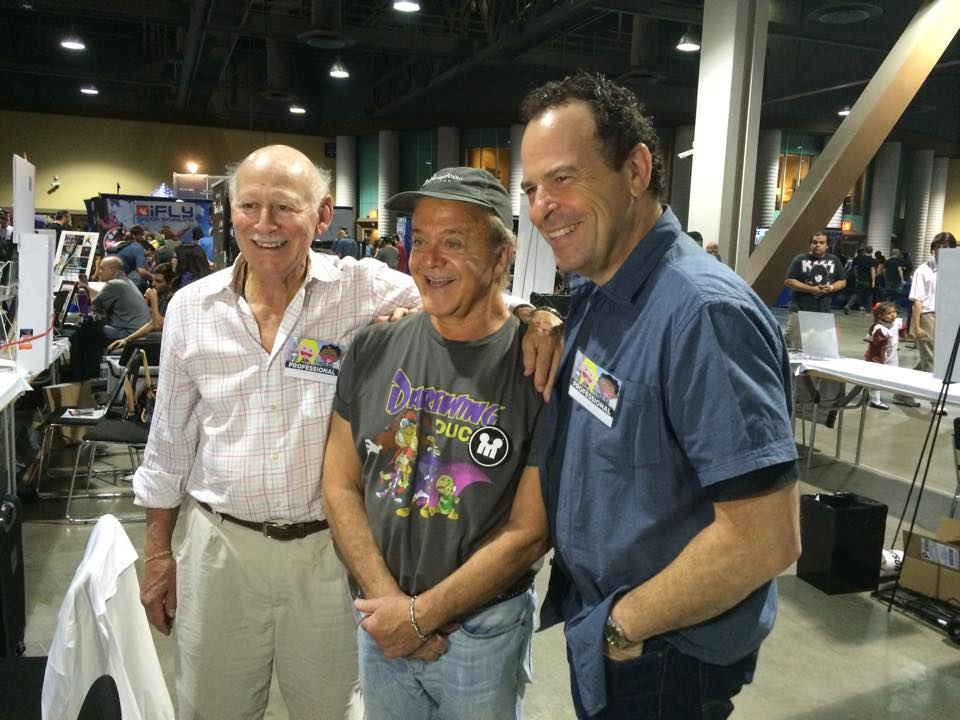
Jim Cummings (middle), with Loren Lester (right), and Alan Oppenheimer (left) in 2015

=== Early work and voice doubling ===
Cummings's first voice role was as Lionel the Lion and Aunt Fira in Dumbo's Circus. Some of Cummings' earliest vocal work was at Disney, where he replaced Sterling Holloway as the voice of Winnie the Pooh in 1988. His impression proved to be so spot-on that he also filled in for Holloway as Kaa for both Jungle Cubs and The Jungle Book 2, and as the Cheshire Cat for various Disney video games. He also impersonated J. Pat O'Malley in the roles of Colonel Hathi for both aforementioned productions and the Colonel in 101 Dalmatians: The Series, Louis Prima as King Louie in Jungle Cubs and TaleSpin, and Wayne Knight as Tantor the Elephant in The Legend of Tarzan. Starting with Goof Troop, Cummings also became the regular voice of Pete.

Beginning with The New Adventures of Winnie the Pooh, Cummings alternated with Paul Winchell as Tigger, before fully replacing him as the character starting with The Tigger Movie. He had also filled in for Winchell as the voice of Zummi Gummi in the final season of Adventures of the Gummi Bears, and as Dick Dastardly in Wacky Races Forever and Wacky Races Starring Dastardly and Muttley. Similarly, he alternated with Peter Cullen in the role of Monterey Jack in Chip 'n Dale: Rescue Rangers. In The Little Mermaid: Ariel's Beginning, Cummings voiced King Triton in place of Kenneth Mars, who was unable to reprise the role due to his struggles with pancreatic cancer. In 1991, he was hired by Warner Bros. Animation to voice Taz on the animated series Taz-Mania and would continue to voice the character in various Looney Tunes media.

When actor Jeremy Irons, the voice of Scar in The Lion King, developed vocal problems during the recording of the song "Be Prepared", Cummings replaced him on the remainder of the track. He also provided Scar's voice in a brief nightmare sequence in The Lion King II: Simba's Pride. Cummings would later be hired as the singing double for both Russell Means as Chief Powhatan and Gordon Tootoosis as Kekata in Pocahontas, and the singing double for Christopher Lloyd as Grigori Rasputin in Anastasia. He went onto understudy for Lloyd by voicing Rasputin for the Anastasia: Adventures with Pooka and Bartok video game.

Cummings has also voiced Smokey Bear for several U.S. Forest Service commercials, ads, and promos from 1993 to 2008.

=== Original characters ===
In Rescue Rangers and TaleSpin, he portrayed a wide variety of other characters. His most famous role in Rescue Rangers was the villainous Fat Cat, and for TaleSpin, he starred as the show's main antagonist, Don Karnage. After both shows concluded production, Cummings went on to portray the title characters in Darkwing Duck and Bonkers, each of which he also got to voice other characters. He would later co-star with Tom Kenny in CatDog, with Cummings playing Cat and Kenny voicing Dog. Also, despite having starred in animated feature films under "additional voices", Cummings achieved a motion picture breakthrough by starring in Disney's Aladdin, where he voiced both Razoul the Agrabah Guard Captain and Farouk the Merchant. He later went on to voice original characters for a variety of the company's theatrical and direct-to-video films, such as Ed the Hyena in The Lion King and Ray the Firefly in The Princess and the Frog. In 1998, Cummings also starred as Ocula the Gorgonite in Small Soldiers, which was a live-action film directed by Joe Dante.

Aside from Fat Cat and Don Karnage, Cummings's involvements as Pete and the Tasmanian Devil were elements that typecast him in antagonistic roles. An example comes from when he voiced Steele the Alaskan Malamute in Universal's Balto. According to an interview with director Simon Wells, the role was originally offered to Brendan Fraser, but executive producer Steven Spielberg recommended recasting the role with Cummings because he wanted to feel a clearer sense of Steele's "inherent evil". Wells stated that Cummings "did a fantastic job, and totally made the character live, so I don't regret the choice.". Other villain roles Cummings took on include Sierra the Cearadactylus in The Land Before Time VII: The Stone of Cold Fire, and Doctor Robotnik in the Sonic the Hedgehog animated series that aired from 1993 to 1994. He also voiced several characters in the 1997 video game Fallout, including the game's main antagonist, The Master.

In addition, he voiced various characters for the Scooby-Doo, Tom and Jerry and Star Wars franchises. His most famous role in Star Wars is Hondo Ohnaka the Weequay Pirate. According to Cummings, Ohnaka was initially only going to appear in a two or three episode story arc of Star Wars: The Clone Wars, but the character was so well-received that he became much more recurring throughout the franchise. Following the departure of Disney chairman Jeffrey Katzenberg, Cummings was hired to portray characters in several productions by DreamWorks, such as voicing the Captain of Lord Farquaad's Guards in Shrek, Hernán Cortés in The Road to El Dorado along with additional characters, and Luca in Sinbad: Legend of the Seven Seas. In 2006, Cummings voiced a variety of characters for the Curious George animated TV show (2006-2022). They included Pisghetti the Italian Chef, the male members of the Quint family, and Jumpy Squirrel.

=== Recent works ===
In 2018, Cummings became the first voice performer of animation to reprise a role or more for a live-action Disney film, reprising the roles of Winnie the Pooh and Tigger for Christopher Robin. For the film, the role of Tigger was originally going to be played by Chris O'Dowd, but due to negative reactions from test audiences, Disney immediately replaced O'Dowd with Cummings. His performance as Pooh was particularly praised by Richard Lawson of Vanity Fair, who felt it was "Oscar-worthy" and said that "[a]s Winnie the Pooh ... the veteran voice actor gives such sweet, rumpled, affable life to the wistful bear of literary renown that it routinely breaks the heart."

Nearly three years later, Cummings reprised the role of Taz by providing uncredited vocal effects for the character in some scenes of Space Jam: A New Legacy. His recordings in question were mixed with material by Fred Tatasciore, who was the character's credited voice actor for the film and previously played the part for Looney Tunes Cartoons. Cummings would later go on to reprise the roles of Fat Cat, Darkwing Duck, and Pete for the Chip 'n Dale: Rescue Rangers film, along with the right arm of Shredder from the 1987 Teenage Mutant Ninja Turtles animated series, and bootleg versions of Pooh and Tigger. Meanwhile, the role of Monterey Jack was played by Australian actor and comedian Eric Bana. Over a year after the film's release, Cummings reprised the role of King Triton for Lego Disney Princess: The Castle Quest, making his first appearance as the character since Ariel's Beginning. Months later, Cummings reprised the role of Winnie the Pooh for Disney's Once Upon a Studio to sing a portion of When You Wish Upon a Star, the short in question also featured him as the voice of Baloo from The Jungle Book for a similar purpose. Cummings was also involved in Disney Speedstorm. For the game, he voiced Steamboat Pete for the "To Infinity and Beyond" season, and he later made his third appearance as King Triton for the "Under the Sea" season.

Beginning on June 12, 2023, Cummings began hosting a podcast called Toon'd In! with Jim Cummings, which is available on Spotify, Apple Podcasts, and Spreaker. In the series, Cummings talks about the wide array of characters he voiced over the years, and various other voice artists guest star in episodes for interviews. In 2025, he reprised several of his past roles (Fat Cat, Darkwing Duck, and Bonkers Bobcat) in the Chibiverse episode "Journey at the Center of the Chibiverse". On March of the same year, Cummings was later revealed to be providing the voices of Pharisee Hillel, Dismas, and James the Greater for The King of Kings, the first animated film to be distributed by Christian film company Angel Studios. Later that year, Cummings returned to Disney Speedstorm by reprising the roles of Winnie the Pooh & Tigger “Rumbly Tumbly Adventure” season. In 2026, the game came to its “Villainous Ever After” season, and Cummings reprised the role of Pete following the character’s incorporation as a racer. Similarly, before the initially cancelled Coyote vs. Acme was released in theaters by Ketchup Entertainment, Cummings was revealed to be reprising the role of Tasmanian Devil.

== Personal life ==
Cummings has two daughters with his former wife Stephanie Jardon. The two were married from 2001 to 2011, when they divorced. In 2019, they became involved in an acrimonious custody dispute, which Cummings won despite his ex-wife's defamatory remarks against him. Cummings also has two older daughters from a previous marriage.

Since May 2020, Cummings has been married to Margaret Judge, who has three children from a previous marriage.

In an interview with the A.V. Club, Cummings commented that his prime voice acting influences are Mel Blanc, Paul Winchell, Paul Frees, June Foray, and Frank Welker. He particularly noted Blanc by classifying him as the "Frank Sinatra of voice acting", and Welker by calling him "The Beatles of voiceover".

In a separate interview with Collider, Cummings stated that his favorite characters to play are Winnie the Pooh, Tigger, Ray the Firefly, Drake Mallard/Darkwing Duck, and Hondo Ohnaka.

He is Catholic and attends St. Jude Parish in Los Angeles.

== Accolades ==
Year	Award	Category	Subject	Result	Ref(s).
1992	Annie Awards	Best Voice Acting for Television	Darkwing Duck	Won	
1993	Annie Awards	Best Voice Acting for Television	Goof Troop	Won	
1995	Annie Awards	Best Voice Acting for Television	Bump in the Night	Nominated	
2003	Annie Awards	Best Voice Acting in a Feature Production	The Jungle Book 2	Nominated	
2011	Annie Awards	Best Voice Acting in a Feature Production	Gnomeo & Juliet	Nominated	
2012	Annie Awards	Best Voice Acting in a Feature Production	Zambezia	Nominated	
2009	Daytime Emmy Awards	Outstanding Performer in an Animated Program	My Friends Tigger & Pooh	Nominated	
2013	Daytime Emmy Awards	Outstanding Performer in an Animated Program	Star Wars: The Clone Wars	Nominated	

In 2026, Cummings was a recipient of the Inkpot Award at the annual San Diego Comic Con.

Preceded by Hal Smith	Voice of Winnie-the-Pooh; 1988–present	Succeeded by Incumbent
Preceded by Paul Winchell	Voice of Tigger; 1989–present	Succeeded by Incumbent
Preceded by Mel Blanc	Voice of Tasmanian Devil; 1991–present	Succeeded by Incumbent
Preceded by Will Ryan	Voice of Pete; 1992–present	Succeeded by Incumbent
