= List of Darkwing Duck characters =

This article includes a list of characters from the Disney series Darkwing Duck.

== Main ==
=== Darkwing Duck ===
Darkwing Duck

Drake Mallard / Darkwing Duck (voiced by Jim Cummings in the original series, Chris Diamantopoulos in the 2017 DuckTales reboot) is an average citizen by day and St. Canard's resident superhero by night. He possesses a mix of genuine altruism and gigantic narcissism – two drives that constantly clash during his adventures. Darkwing's origins are rather fuzzy. During his childhood and teenage years, Drake was a complete dork, but by his high school days, he had already developed an obsession with crime-fighting. However, he frequently claims to have become a superhero after his teenage years and has operated as Darkwing Duck for an unspecified amount of time. Furthermore, he was at least partially inspired by S.H.U.S.H. agent Derek Blunt and trained in martial arts by Goose Lee. In his earliest days of crime-fighting, he was more focused on the headlines from his career, to the point where he laments having no life outside his showboating and no friends to turn to outside of Launchpad McQuack, Gosalyn, and Honker, who help keep him grounded. The latter in particular proves to be vital to him, as Gosalyn being hurt or worse is one of his biggest fears and he became a ruthless dictator in an alternate timeline where he lost her. His two recurring catchphrases are "I am the terror that flaps in the night" (followed by an improvised metaphor before he gives his name), and the battle cry "let's get dangerous". Darkwing Duck's costume, gas gun, and flashy introductions are reminiscent of pulp heroes like The Shadow, Batman and The Green Hornet, as well as Zorro.

Because of loose continuity in the series, as well as Darkwing's self-aggrandizing habits, he has multiple origin stories as to how and why he became Darkwing Duck – including the following:

- "Paraducks", in which the young Drake is inspired by his own time-travelling future self.
- "Clash Reunion", in which he wears a random disguise to defend his high school prom from Megavolt.
- "The Secret Origins of Darkwing Duck", a Superman parody that is not meant to be taken as his true origin. Throughout the episode, it is even suggested that it is just nonsense being spouted by a future version of Drake to make his origin seem cooler, though it is later stated that the "myth" has "some basis in reality".
- "A Star is Scorned", a "what if" episode portraying Darkwing's life as an act for a television series.

In the 2017 DuckTales series, Drake Mallard is an upcoming actor set to star in a Darkwing Duck movie who grew up watching the series of the same name and views Jim Starling, the original Darkwing (voiced by Cummings, Darkwing's original voice actor), as his hero. When Starling goes crazy after finding out the film was not going to star him, Mallard takes it upon himself to be the hero and save the day. After the film is cancelled, Mallard is encouraged by Launchpad to become Darkwing Duck in real life.

=== Launchpad McQuack ===
Launchpad McQuack (voiced by Terry McGovern in the original series, Beck Bennett in the 2017 DuckTales reboot) is Darkwing Duck's sidekick and pilot who originally appeared as a main character in the original 1987 DuckTales. He refers to Darkwing as "DW" and Drake as "Mallardman", to which Darkwing sometimes refers to him as "LP" in return. He is Darkwing's self-proclaimed biggest fan, even spending a year designing and building the Thunderquack aircraft out of fanboy urges.

Launchpad's evil Negaverse counterpart appears in the episode "Life, the Negaverse and Everything", serving Negaduck in subjugating his version of St. Canard until he is defeated by Darkwing Duck and the Friendly Four.

=== Gosalyn Mallard ===
Gosalyn Mallard (birth name Waddlemeyer) (voiced by Christine Cavanaugh in the original series, Stephanie Beatriz in the 2017 DuckTales reboot) is Drake Mallard's 9-year-old adoptive daughter and an unstoppable bundle of energy and spunk. Her grandfather, Professor Waddlemeyer, was a famous scientist who was murdered by Taurus Bulba's underlings. She is an occasional crime fighter, having gone by codenames such as the "Crimson Quackette", "Yucky Duck", the "Quiverwing Quack" and "Gosmoduck" in the Boom! Studios comics, though she often gets involved in Darkwing's affairs as herself.

Gosalyn's Negaverse counterpart appears in the episode "Life, the Negaverse and Everything" as an extremely sweet, sentimental, and compliant little girl with similar morality as her "prime" counterpart. Despite being an alternate reality version of his adopted daughter, Drake became protective of the Negaverse Gosalyn upon learning her guardian is Negaduck and ensured the Friendly Four could take care of her before returning to his own reality.

Gosalyn also appears in the DuckTales reboot, re-imagined as a young duck with Latin American roots. She makes her first appearance in the one-hour special "Let's Get Dangerous!", which incorporates the origin story of her original counterpart.

== The Muddlefoots ==
The Muddlefoots are Drake, Launchpad, and Gosalyn's next-door neighbors, Drake finding them irritating due to their intrusive ways. The Mallards and Launchpad usually manage to tolerate them and even grudgingly like them, though not nearly as much as the Muddlefoots imagine.

In the episode "Life, the Negaverse and Everything", their evil Negaverse counterparts serve Negaduck in subjugating their version of St. Canard until they are defeated by Darkwing Duck and the Friendly Four.

=== Herb Muddlefoot ===
Herbert "Herb" Muddlefoot, Sr. (voiced by Jim Cummings impersonating Andy Devine) is the father of Tank and Honker Muddlefoot and the husband of Binkie Muddlefoot. He is a brash, loudmouthed, overweight duck who is often clueless about events around him and works as a "Quackerware" salesman. Despite his views on the Muddlefoots and impatience with Herb in particular, Drake has worked well with the latter on occasion, though due to his oblivious nature, Herb views Drake as his best friend. In the episode "A Star is Scorned", Herb and Binkie Muddlefoot are revealed to be actors who have to act out of character as ruthless business tycoons due to a hidden clause in their acting contracts that says "The Studio is always right"!

=== Binkie Muddlefoot ===
Binkie Muddlefoot (voiced by Susan Tolsky) is a yellow canary and parody of 1950s housewives who is invariably overbearing yet ditzy. Competent in housework, she often serves as a foil to Herb's fun. Throughout the series, it is suggested she and Herb are destined souls, since there have been many incarnations of them seen in various timelines and dimensions and they almost always find each other and fall in love.

=== Tank Muddlefoot ===
Tankard "Tank" H. Muddlefoot (voiced by Dana Hill) is the eldest Muddlefoot son and a bully who often makes life difficult for his younger brother, Honker. Despite being the son of a duck and a canary, Tank takes after his father.

Tank's Negaverse counterpart appears in the episode "Life, the Negaverse and Everything" with a personality similar to the "prime" Honker, albeit with more confidence, and the only member of the Negaverse Muddlefoots who does not serve Negaduck.

=== Honker Muddlefoot ===
Herbert "Honker" Muddlefoot, Jr. (voiced by Katie Leigh) is the youngest Muddlefoot son and Gosalyn's best friend. In contrast to his brother, Honker takes after his mother. Unlike the rest of his family, Honker is an intelligent individual who demonstrates a mastery of sciences more akin to a laboratory professor than an elementary school student. He is also one of the few characters to know Darkwing's secret identity, though it is unknown how long he has known or how the discovery was made. Unlike Launchpad, who refers to Drake as DW in public, Honker makes sure to address him as "Mr. Mallard". He also calls Darkwing "sir" to make sure he does not slip up. He is also the only member of the Muddlefoots who Darkwing genuinely likes and tolerates most of the time, though he has been annoyed by the youth's stuttering.

== Allies ==
=== The Justice Ducks ===
The Justice Ducks are a team of superheroes formed in the two-part episode "Just Us Justice Ducks" to help Darkwing fend off the Fearsome Five.

==== Gizmoduck ====
Fenton Crackshell / Gizmoduck (voiced by Hamilton Camp in the original series, Lin-Manuel Miranda in the 2017 DuckTales reboot) is Launchpad's old friend and Darkwing's former rival superhero who originally appeared as a recurring character in the original DuckTales. While Gizmoduck overshadows him in fame and attention whenever the former is in St. Canard, Darkwing comes to appreciate him following their first encounter in the episode "Up, Up and Awry".

==== Morgana Macawber ====
Morgana Macawber (voiced by Kath Soucie) is a sorceress duck who was originally a supervillain, but later reforms and becomes Darkwing's girlfriend. While she is very powerful, Morgana has trouble using her magic. Introduced in the episode "Fungus Amongus", Darkwing first meets her while she is serving as the president and chairperson of a mushroom-producing company that steals pizza toppings in a plot to take control of the pizza industry before she eventually defects and helps Darkwing foil the plot. In "Ghoul of My Dreams", she joins forces with Nodoff to put St. Canard's citizens to sleep and rob them to pay off her student loans, but she reforms in the end and helps Darkwing defeat Nodoff. In the Boom! Studios comics, she sacrifices herself to save Darkwing from the monstrous Duckthulu. However, Darkwing believes she is still alive and lost in another reality, but is unable to find her.

===== Eek and Squeak =====
Eek and Squeak (both voiced by Frank Welker) are Morgana's pet bats who usually accompany her wherever she goes.

===== Archie =====
Archie (voiced by Frank Welker) is Morgana's pet spider who also usually accompanies her wherever she goes.

==== Neptunia ====
Neptunia (voiced by Susan Silo) is a mutated anthropomorphic fish and self-appointed protector of the sea. She uses a shell as a horn to command the non-anthropomorphic creatures of the ocean to do her bidding and is often seen with a giant octopus named Hal. Introduced in the episode "Something Fishy", she was once a normal fish until radioactive waste mutated her into her current form. She becomes fed up with sea pollution and attempts to flood St. Canard until it becomes part of her ocean domain. However, she eventually has a change of heart and reverses the flooding after Launchpad convinces her that not all land-dwellers are polluters. Like Morgana, she reforms and becomes a hero.

==== Stegmutt ====
Stegmutt (voiced by Joey Camen) is a dimwitted janitor duck who the mad scientist Doctor Fossil transformed into a humanoid Stegosaurus to serve as his minion in the episode "Jurassic Jumble". He initially battles Darkwing, but with Gosalyn and Honker's help, Stegmutt learns of Dr. Fossil's evil intentions and turns against him. While Fossil's other victims are returned to normal, Stegmutt chooses to remain a dinosaur for unknown reasons and goes on to join the Justice Ducks.

=== S.H.U.S.H. ===
S.H.U.S.H. (expanded name unknown) is an intelligence agency that deals with international affairs that regular authorities cannot. Darkwing Duck often works freelance for them, though he is not an official employee. The organization is a parody of Marvel Comics' S.H.I.E.L.D.

In the 2017 DuckTales series, a new version of S.H.U.S.H. appears in flashbacks. The organization was led by Ludwig Von Drake and included Bentina Beakley / Agent 22, Scrooge McDuck as a freelance agent, and Bradford Buzzard as an accountant.

==== J. Gander Hoover ====
J. Gander Hooter (voiced by Danny Mann) is an elderly goose and the head director of S.H.U.S.H. who regards Darkwing very highly and often calls him in on cases where he feels that a certain element of surprise that only Darkwing is able to create is needed.
The character's name is a play on J. Edgar Hoover and was reworked and redesigned from an earlier DuckTales character named J. Gander Hoover, who appeared in the episode "Double-O-Duck" and worked for a different intelligence agency.

==== Vladimir Grizzlifoff ====
Vladimir Goudenov Grizzlikof (voiced by Ron Feinberg) is a Russian grizzly bear and S.H.U.S.H.'s top agent. He is depicted as very strong and adheres to S.H.U.S.H. standard procedure closely. He and Darkwing have a longstanding rivalry which stems from Grizzlikof's by-the-book procedure compared to Darkwing's instinctual and spontaneous fighting style, though their relationship slowly becomes a mutual one.

==== Dr. Sara Bellum ====
Dr. Sara Bellum (voiced by Jodi Carlisle) is a S.H.U.S.H. scientist who is unnervingly enthusiastic about her projects, to the extent that she will risk endangering herself and others in the course of her experiments. Her name is a pun on cerebellum.

==== Derek Blunt ====
Derek Blunt (voiced by Peter Renaday) is a British bald eagle reputed to be the greatest agent in the history of S.H.U.S.H. and the only person to ever bring down master criminal Phineas Sharp. However, the latter resurfaces, forcing J. Gander to bring the former out of retirement and pair him with Darkwing to stop Sharp once more. Despite initially being annoyed by the superhero, who admires and claims to have been inspired by him, Blunt begrudgingly admits to being impressed by Darkwing and parts on good terms with him following the mission's end.
His name is a reference to fictional adventurer and James Bond parody character Derek Flint.

==== Darkwing Duck Squad ====
The Darkwing Squad are a group of four S.H.U.S.H. agents who Darkwing trained to become a team, only for them to follow in his example too closely.

- Professor Darkwing Deer (voiced by Sara Partridge) is a S.H.U.S.H. agent and member of the Darkwing Squad who picked up on Darkwing's vanity.
- Professor Darkwing Dodo is a S.H.U.S.H. agent and member of the Darkwing Squad who literally does not look where he leaps, on the grounds that "a daring do-gooder never plans".
- Professor Darkwing Dog is a S.H.U.S.H. agent and member of the Darkwing Squad who practices how to best flatten his head with an anvil.
- Professor Darkwing Donkey (voiced by Jeff Rawluk) is a S.H.U.S.H. agent and member of the Darkwing Squad who also picked up on Darkwing's vanity.

==== Femme Appeal ====
Femme Appeal is a statuesque fox who first appears in the Boom! Studios comic story "F.O.W.L. Disposition". She initially appears as an agent of F.O.W.L. who operates with Steelbeak. However, she is later revealed to be a double-agent sent by S.H.U.S.H. to investigate F.O.W.L. and stop them from summoning Duckthulhu.
Her name is a reference to fictional spy Emma Peel.

==== Desiree Bell ====
Doctor Desiree Bell is a duck scientist who appears in the Joe Books comic story "Orange is the New Purple", where she is introduced as Darkwing's new S.H.U.S.H. liaison. She is also in charge of overseeing S.H.U.S.H.'s new first response defense satellite, reclaimed from Taurus Bulba and Quackwerks. She also coordinates the reunion of the Justice Ducks (sans Morgana) in the comic story "Dawn of the Day of the Return of the Living Spud".

=== Other heroes ===
==== Comet Guy ====
Comet Guy (voiced by William Callaway) is an alien superhero from the planet Mertz who resembles a physically exaggerated human being. Comet Guy possesses numerous superpowers including throwing fireballs, freeze vision, flight, super strength, and super speed. However, he has a dimwitted personality and his primary weakness is that the sound of a bell will cause him to dance to the exclusion of all else until he hears a whistle. Initially considered a failure on his planet, Darkwing trains him to turn his weaknesses into strengths.

==== Friendly Four ====
The Friendly Four are fairly inept and superheroic versions of the Fearsome Four native to the Negaverse. Because of their pacifistic nature, they are retrained by Darkwing Duck into Darkwing's Ducks so they can defeat Negaduck, restore order to their version of St. Canard and become the Negaverse Gosalyn's new guardian after Darkwing returns to his reality.

==== Posiduck ====
Posiduck (voiced by Jim Cummings) is the embodiment of Darkwing Duck's positive traits made entirely of positrons who was created after Megavolt's tron-splitter device split Darkwing into positrons and negatrons. In keeping with his component particles, Posiduck is exceedingly kind, gentle, lenient, and generally pacifistic. He later becomes galvanized into a powerful being of positive energy, gaining the ability to undo negatronic damage and walk on air, to battle his similarly galvanized negatron counterpart.

== Villains ==
=== The Fearsome Five ===
The Fearsome Five are Darkwing Duck's five greatest enemies who often work independently, but also work as a team on occasion.

==== Negaduck ====
Negaduck (voiced by Jim Cummings) is Darkwing Duck's evil doppelgänger and arch-nemesis. Hailing from a nightmarish parallel universe called the "Negaverse", Negaduck is identical to Darkwing due to being his alternate counterpart, except for his yellow, red, and black costume. Like Darkwing, Negaduck is narcissistic and normally has no special powers or abilities, instead relying on his intellect, physical prowess, intimidation, and gadgets. However, he can also disguise himself as Darkwing. Unlike Darkwing, Negaduck is cruel, ruthless and has no qualms about hurting others to get what he wants, which is primarily great wealth and authority over the world. As such, he serves as the Fearsome Five's leader as he intimidates them into agreeing with what he says. Despite viewing them as weaklings, he would later use a magical gem to steal their powers and transform himself into Mega Negaduck. In the episode "Life, the Negaverse and Everything", Darkwing discovers his evil counterpart rules over the Negaverse's version of St. Canard. In the comic story "The Duck Knight Returns", he discovers Darkwing's secret identity and attacks him at his home, an event that causes the superhero to retire for a year. Negaduck would later join forces with Magica De Spell to ruin Darkwing's reputation using brainwashed alternate reality versions of both himself and Darkwing. In the comic story "Crisis on Infinite Darkwings", Megavolt's tron-splitter is used to reduce Negaduck to several microscopic particles of good and evil, though by the story "Orange is the New Purple", he manages to reconstitute himself, take over St. Canard Penitentiary, and trap Darkwing inside with every supervillain he helped imprison. One source of rage for Negaduck is that on a Public Enemies list he is Public Enemy No 2 {behind Dr Slug; Megavolt is Public Enemy No 3

In the 2017 DuckTales series, Negaduck was once Jim Starling, an actor who portrayed Darkwing Duck in the original series of the same name who was also voiced by Jim Cummings. Wanting to regain his fame, he tries to replace Drake Mallard, the star of a film adaptation of the series, but ends up going insane and attacks the studio. Mallard and Launchpad attempt to stop him, though Starling is apparently killed saving them. Unbeknownst to them, Starling survived; vowing revenge with his outfit now sporting Negaduck-like colors. Cummings reprised his role for this appearance.

===== Negaduck (Negatron version) =====
Negaduck (negatron version) (voiced by Jim Cummings) is the physical embodiment of Darkwing Duck's negative traits made entirely of negatrons created after Megavolt's tron-splitter device split Darkwing's positrons and negatrons. While he is unrelated to the Negaverse version of Negaduck, like him, this version is similarly evil, malicious, sadistic, and often uses weapons to terrorize people and commit crimes. He later becomes galvanized into a powerful being of negative energy, gaining the ability to fire destructive negatronic energy beams. However, he is forced to fight his similarly galvanized positronic counterpart Posiduck, whom he is later re-fused with to restore the original Darkwing.

==== Dr. Reginald Bushroot ====
Dr. Reginald Bushroot (voiced by Tino Insana) is a scientist duck who originally worked at St. Canard University, where he tried to integrate plant chloroplasts into animals in an attempt to give people the ability to feed themselves through photosynthesis. After his research funding was cut, Bushroot used himself as a test subject in an attempt to prove that his theories were correct and thereby regain his funding. The experiment was a success, though he was turned into a half-duck / half-shrub mutant with the power to control plants. Unlike the other members of the Fearsome Five, Bushroot is not motivated to commit crime out of greed or a desire for power; rather, he is driven to find or create a companion who will not reject him.
Series creator Tad Stones calls the character "barely a villain" and said that, "left on his own he'd eventually come over to the good side."

Originally pitched as a farmer named "Bib Overalls" who controlled an army of corn by writers Jim Peterson, Rob Humphrey, and John Behnke, Stones changed the character's name to Bushroot and broadened the focus of his powers.

Bushroot also appears in the 2017 reboot of DuckTales, albeit in a non-speaking role.

===== Spike =====
Spike is Bushroot's pet carnivorous plant and assistant. Spike behaves much in the manner of a dog, to the point that he likes playing fetch and craves his master's attention.

===== Posey =====
Posey (voiced by Frank Welker) is a "vampire potato" originally intended to be Bushroot's wife. However, due to Spike handing him the wrong ingredients, Bushroot accidentally creates a gigantic potato that feeds on people's blood, turning them into zombified couch potatoes, before she is eventually destroyed. In the Joe Books comic story "Dawn of the Day of the Return of the Living Spud", she is revealed to be alive and used as a power supply for a company producing genetically engineered vegetables. However, this backfired as the potatoes became alive and turned people into zombies. While Bushroot initially refrains from stopping her, still seeing her his one true love, Darkwing eventually convinces him to help him defeat her.

==== Megavolt ====
Megavolt (voiced by Dan Castellaneta in the original series, Keith Ferguson in the 2017 DuckTales reboot) is an insane rat with the ability to control electricity and a former classmate of Darkwing Duck's in high school, where he gained his powers after bullies sabotaged his science experiment. Known in his civilian life as Elmo Sputterspark, Megavolt debuted as his supervillain persona at the senior prom to get revenge on his classmates, spurring Drake Mallard to create his Darkwing Duck persona and defend the guests. Most of Megavolt's crimes are motivated by the delusional belief that he is helping to "free" electrical devices, which he believes are sentient beings who have been enslaved. He is the only member of the Fearsome Five to team up with another member independent of the organization, twice partnering with Quackerjack. In the comic story "The Duck Knight Returns", he is forced to retire from super-villainy and get an office job, though he eventually returns to being Megavolt at Negaduck's behest.

Megavolt is creator Tad Stones' favorite villain, and as a result, is the most frequently appearing antagonist in the series.

Megavolt also appears in the 2017 reboot of DuckTales, voiced by Keith Ferguson.

==== Quackerjack ====
Quackerjack (voiced by Michael Bell) is a toymaker who went insane after the invention of video games put him out of business and became a harlequin-style jester-themed supervillain to seek revenge. While he lacks powers, he wields an arsenal of toy-themed weaponry, such as his trademark doll, Mr. Banana Brain, which Quackerjack treats as a sentient sidekick, and mechanical chatteringteeth toys of various sizes. In Boom! Studios' comics, Quackerjack becomes a more dangerous villain after Negaduck destroys Mr. Banana Brain on the grounds Quackerjack is not "mean enough" to be a serious villain. However, Quackerjack eventually grows tired of being more evil and turns himself into a toy outside his old girlfriend's house, believing "this is the best I can ever be".
Unlike the rest of the Fearsome Five, Quackerjack has very little origin story as a result of creator Tad Stones being disappointed that the character did not come across as dark in his initial appearance as he had hoped and is the only member not to have his real name revealed. His name is a pun on the word "crackerjack".

Quackerjack also appears in the 2017 reboot of DuckTales, with Bell reprising his role.

===== Mr. Banana Brain =====
Mr. Banana Brain is a banana-headed doll that Quackerjack seems to always have with him. Mr. Banana Brain is the closest thing Quackerjack has to a recurring sidekick, as he frequently makes him "talk" via ventriloquism. In the episode "The Haunting of Mr. Banana Brain", the doll was possessed by the demon Paddywhack and truly came to life, though Quackerjack was left bemused by Mr. Banana-Brain's "new" personality yet unsurprised by the doll's ability to speak and move independently.

==== Liquidator ====
Bud E. Flud / Liquidator (voiced by Jack Angel in the original series, Corey Burton in the first appearance of the 2017 DuckTales reboot, Keith Ferguson in the second appearance of the 2017 DuckTales reboot) is a mutant dog-like creature with the power to assume a viscous form and control water who constantly talks in advertising-style lingo. Bud E. Flud was formerly a crooked bottled water salesman who began poisoning his competitors' supply to try to achieve a monopoly on St. Canard's bottled water business. When Darkwing catches him in the act, Flud panics and falls into a reservoir he had contaminated, ushering his mutation into the Liquidator. Following this, he forgets that he fell in and comes to believe that Darkwing pushed him in. Due to his water-based powers, he and Megavolt do not interact well. Though he and Bushroot become good friends.

Of the Fearsome Five members, the Liquidator is the only one to have a single standalone episode, as creator Tad Stones found the character too "one note"; preferring to write episodes for Bushroot or Megavolt.

The Liquidator also appears in the 2017 reboot of DuckTales, voiced by Corey Burton in his first appearance and Keith Ferguson in his second.

===== Liquidator's Mascots =====
The Liquidator's Mascots (voiced by Darleen Carr and B.J. Ward) are a pair of women who appear with the Liquidator in his introductory episode "Dry Hard". They were the mascots for Bud Flud's bottled water company before joining him as the Liquidator.

=== F.O.W.L. ===
F.O.W.L. (The Fiendish Organization for World Larceny) is a terrorist organization akin to S.P.E.C.T.R.E. from the James Bond novels by Ian Fleming. F.O.W.L. was originally introduced in the 1987 DuckTales episode "Double-O-Duck" as the "Foreign Organization for World Larceny".

In the 2017 DuckTales series, a new version of F.O.W.L. appears as the primary antagonists of the show's third season. The organization is led by Bradford Buzzard, who served as the chairman of McDuck Enterprises' board of directors and co-founded F.O.W.L. alongside Black Heron and also includes Gandra Dee, John D. Rockerduck, Jeeves, the Phantom Blot, and new incarnations of Steelbeak and Taurus Bulba.

==== High Command ====
The High Command (voiced by Danny Mann in "Dirty Money", Dan Castellaneta in "Cleanliness is Next to Badliness", Rob Paulsen in "Smarter Than a Speeding Bullet", Patric Zimmerman in "Dirtysomething", Jodi Carlisle in "Heavy Mental", Jim Cummings in "The Steerminator") are F.O.W.L.'s three commanders. Whether appearing individually or all together, they are always hidden in shadows and their true names are never mentioned. Their silhouettes consist of a middle member with a big head and fangs, a member with a hunched back, and a silent member who wears the over-sized hat with an implyment that they might be birds.

In the Boom! Studios comics, the rise of the company Quackwerks decimated F.O.W.L., leading to a disgruntled High Command compensating for this by trying to summon the demon Duckthulhu.

==== Steelbeak ====
Steelbeak (voiced by Rob Paulsen in the original series, Jason Mantzoukas in the 2017 DuckTales reboot) is a suave, urbane rooster who serves as F.O.W.L.'s chief agent and second-in-command who acts like a 1920s gangster. He gets his name from the metal beak he wears, which F.O.W.L. provided him with after he lost his original beak under unrevealed circumstances, that also serves as a weapon similarly to recurring James Bond villain Jaws.

===== Fang =====
Fang is a robotic bear and agent of F.O.W.L. who works for Steelbeak in the episode "Bearskin Thug".

==== Ammonia Pine ====
Ammonia Pine (voiced by Mitzi McCall) is a former cleaning lady who worked at a research lab and accidentally inhaled the fumes of an experimental bathroom disinfectant, which turned her into a cleaning-obsessed villain and recruited by F.O.W.L. for their dastardly plans. True to her obsession, she hates and fears dirt.

==== Ample Grime ====
Ample Grime (voiced by Ellen Gerstell) is Ammonia Pine's messy, dirt-loving sister, who hates and fears cleanliness as much as Ammonia hates dirt.

==== Major Synapse ====
Major Synapse (voiced by John Stephenson) is a stereotypical military man, though he lacks the intelligence to match as he once sent a group of F.O.W.L. soldiers into an erupting volcano to "secure" it and caused two of his underlings, Hotshot and Flygirl, to be flattened by an anvil. He attempts to steal S.H.U.S.H.'s "Norma Ray" so he can turn his hippie underlings into super-powered psychic troops before using it on himself, gaining a giant brain and his own psychic abilities. This plot backfires after Darkwing Duck, Launchpad, and Gosalyn overload him with questions while shooting him with the Norma Ray, causing him to explode.

===== Hotshot =====
Hotshot (voiced by Danny Mann) is one of Major Synapse's hippie underlings turned super psychic with the ability to control fire and ice. In the comic story "F.O.W.L. Disposition", Hotshot and Flygirl briefly reappear under Ammonia Pine's command, but end up defeating themselves when Honker tricks them into getting crushed by an anvil again.

===== Flygirl =====
Flygirl (voiced by Teresa Ganzel) is one of Major Synapse's hippie underlings turned super psychic with telekinesis and flight. In the comic story "F.O.W.L. Disposition", Flygirl and Hotshot briefly reappear under Ammonia Pine's command, but end up defeating themselves when Honker tricks them into getting crushed by an anvil again.

==== Eggmen ====
The Eggmen (various voices) are F.O.W.L.'s foot soldiers, who are recognizable by their white, egg-shaped helmets.

=== Other villains ===
==== Taurus Bulba ====
Taurus Bulba (voiced by Tim Curry in the original series, James Monroe Iglehart in the 2017 DuckTales reboot) is a ruthless and dangerous bull criminal mastermind and supervillain. He is arguably one of Darkwing's most dangerous enemies. Despite initially not having superpowers, Bulba prides himself on his intellect as well as his superior physical strength and endurance. In the two-part pilot, "Darkly Dawns the Duck", he orders his underlings to glean information from Professor Waddlemeyer, only for them to kill the scientist when he refused to talk. As a result, Bulba comes into conflict with Darkwing and becomes the hero's first major enemy.

After attempting to kill Darkwing along with himself in an explosion at Canard Tower and being presumed dead, F.O.W.L. revived Bulba as a cyborg to work for them. However, the crime boss refuses and attacks the organization's personnel, becoming their enemy, ruthlessly worse than Darkwing Duck, before seeking revenge on him, only to be defeated once more.

In the comic story "The Duck Knight Returns", Bulba secretly establishes the company Quackwerks and launches a corporate takeover of St. Canard, maintaining control of the city for a year before he is eventually exposed and defeated a third time.

His name is a reference to Nikolai Gogol's hero Taras Bulba, and the Latin word for "bull".

Taurus Bulba also appears in the 2017 DuckTales reboot, as a McDuck Enterprises scientist working for F.O.W.L. to figure out a relic called Solego's Circuit, only to go rogue to destroy all of reality.

===== Hammerhead Hannigan =====
Hammerhead Hannigan (voiced by Hal Rayle in "Darkly Dawns the Duck", Tad Stones in "In Like Blunt") is a surly goat and Bulba's lead henchman who talks and acts like a stereotypical 1930s gangster. He is capable of using his head like a blunt object via headbutts.

As of the episode "In Like Blunt" however, Hammerhead broke off from Bulba and became a notorious supervillain in his own right where he attended Phineas Sharp's auction of the list of S.H.A.R.P. agents.

===== Hoof and Mouth =====
Hoof and Mouth are a mute, dimwitted donkey and a talkative, slightly smarter by comparison ram (voiced by Eddie Deezen) as well as two of Bulba's henchmen. They are both exceptionally clumsy and often suffer Hammerhead's physical abuse.
It is unclear which one is Hoof and which is Mouth. Their combined names are a pun on hoof-and-mouth disease.

===== Clovis =====
Clovis (voiced by Marcia Wallace) is a blonde cow and Bulba's personal secretary.

===== Tantalus =====
Tantalus is Bulba's pet, non-anthropomorphic vulture who participates in his master's schemes.

==== Lilliput ====
Lilliput (voiced by Frank Welker) is the owner of the miniature golf course "Goony Golf" who uses a strange hat to communicate with and control ants. With his ant minions and his shrink ray, he attempts to turn St. Canard's monuments into miniature props for his golf course, only to be defeated by Darkwing after the hero shrinks down to the size of a germ and "infects" Lilliput. In the comic story "Orange is the New Purple", he tries to catch Gosalyn, but she is able to defeat him.

==== Trenchrot ====
Major Trenchrot (voiced by Charlie Adler) is a major who attempted to build a supervillains-only resort on a jungle island by eliminating the island's gorilla population, only to be foiled by them and Darkwing.

==== The King ====
The King (voiced by Patrick Pinney impersonating Elvis Presley) is an Elvis impersonator and gang leader who wields a guitar he calls "Cecile", which is capable of firing concussive soundwaves. He takes over St. Canard after Darkwing and Gosalyn accidentally travel back in time and cause Drake's younger self to join the King's gang and helped him rob a music store, though they eventually defeat him in a musical battle.

===== Lamont =====
Lamont (voiced by Candi Milo) is the King's younger brother and a schoolmate of young Drake Mallard who often bullied him.

===== Boxcar =====
Boxcar is a fox and member of the King's gang.

==== Appliances ====
The Appliances are a group of four electrical devices that Megavolt brought to life after he is shocked by his new "power-transfer generator" device. At first, they help Megavolt in his efforts to bring more appliances to life so they can take over St. Canard under his leadership. However, the Appliances eventually question their need for the supervillain as their leader and hold him captive so they can use him in the city's new power generator and bring all the appliances in the city to life so they can start a revolution against their owners. Eventually, Darkwing, Gosalyn, and Honker use their ingenuity to defeat the Appliances and turn them back to normal.

- The Refrigerator (voiced by Neil Ross) is the first appliance that Megavolt brings to life. He has the ability to freeze people and objects with his breath.
- The Television Set (voiced by S. Scott Bullock) is an appliance who does impressions of several well-known TV personalities such as Desi Arnaz, Johnny Carson, Jack Nicholson, William Buckley, Paul Reubens as Pee-wee Herman, and Walter Cronkite.
- The Electric Guitar (voiced by Brian George) is Honker's guitar, who was accidentally brought to life by Megavolt. He speaks with a Cockney accent and behaves like a stereotypical British rock star.
- The Hooded Hair Dryer Chair (voiced by Marilyn Lightstone) is a chair who is accidentally brought to life by Megavolt's failed attempt to bring a multipurpose power tool to life.

==== Arturo Tuskernini ====
Arturo Tuskernini (voiced by Kenneth Mars) is an ego-driven walrus film director whose schemes are built around films and filmmaking.

He is named after famed conductor Arturo Toscanini.

===== Penguins =====
The Penguins are Tuskernini's silent yet efficient henchmen and film crew.

===== Film characters =====
The following are film characters that are brought to life by Tuskernini:

- The Zombie is a fictional chainsaw-wielding zombie whom Tuskernini brings to life to assist him in committing crimes.
- The Snake-Eyed Kid is a fictional western gunfighter whom Tuskernini brings to life to assist him in committing crimes.
- Mongo from Mars is a fictional Martian octopus-like creature whom Tuskernini brings to life to assist him in committing crimes.
- Fleabeard is a fictional pirate whom Tuskernini brings to life to kill Darkwing.
- Kongo (pronounced "Konjo") is a fictional giant gorilla and King Kong parody whom Tuskernini brings to life to assist him in committing crimes. However, he is unable to maintain control of Kongo who later kidnaps Gosalyn and carries her to the top of a skyscraper.

==== Newt Glimmer ====
Newt Glimmer (voiced by Jim Cummings) is a security guard for A. F. Erret Studios, the first husband of actress Gloria Swansong, and one of the "phantoms" sabotaging the studio's films in the episode "Hush, Hush Sweet Charlatan". He reveals his true identity when he foils Tuskernini's scheme and nearly kills everyone present before being defeated by Darkwing.

==== Jambalaya Jake ====
Jambalaya Jake (voiced by Michael Gough) is a short Cajun criminal from the bayou who attempted to rob St. Canard's citizens, only to be foiled by Darkwing.

===== Gumbo =====
Gumbo (vocal effects provided by Jim Cummings) is Jambalaya Jake's non-anthropomorphic alligator henchman.

==== Jock Newbody ====
Jock Newbody (voiced by Hamilton Camp) is a former fitness guru and body builder who became obsessed with extending his life and regaining his youth. Turning to arcane practices, he was able to live to become 122 while retaining much of his strength before perfecting a formula for a true fountain of youth. While he succeeded in acquiring the final ingredient and achieving his dream of having a young adult body, his decision to betray his henchmen and interference from Darkwing and Herb leave him trapped in an infant's body.

===== Slim and Flex =====
Slim (voiced by Brenda Vaccaro) and Flex (voiced by Rob Paulsen) are Jock's underlings and trainers at his fitness center. Slim behaves like a stereotypical slave-driving personal trainer while Flex is dimwitted in comparison and has a habit of repeating himself. Once Jock regains his youth, he tries to kill them along with Darkwing for knowing about his elixir. In response, they turn against him and try to take the elixir for themselves, only to become infants alongside Jock.

==== Professor Moliarty ====
Professor Moliarty (voiced by Jim Cummings) is a mush-mouthed mole who hatches schemes to take over or destroy the surface world and employs several mole henchmen. His name is a reference to Sherlock Holmes' nemesis, James Moriarty.

==== Wacko ====
Wacko (voiced by Hal Rayle) is an alien criminal capable of altering his physical structure from a small and cute "normal" form to a huge and muscular one. He seeks to destroy the universe using explosives called "seismospheres", but was captured by extraterrestrial legal authorities who outfitted him with a collar that negated his abilities and prevented him from speaking. Wacko escaped custody, acquired the seismospheres and fled to Earth, where he is found by Drake, Gosalyn, Honker and Tank. He is adopted by Gosalyn, who helps him evade arrest, get the collar off and reacquire the seismospheres, which Tank kept after he mistook them for jawbreakers. While he attempted to fight back, Wacko is ultimately defeated by Darkwing, Gosalyn and Captain Big Nasty of the Outer Space Patrol.

==== Doctor Fossil ====
Doctor Fossil (voiced by Barry Gordon) is an anthropomorphic Pteranodon and the creator of Stegmutt. Dr. Fossil was originally a paleontologist duck who worked at St. Canard's natural history museum until he turned himself into a prehistoric reptile using his Retro-Evolution Gun, an invention of his own making that he used to create Stegmutt and turn him into his henchman. As a result of his transformation, Fossil became an outcast and plotted revenge by turning St. Canard's citizens into dinosaurs as well as use a passing comet to destroy mankind so that dinosaurs would once again be the dominant lifeforms on the planet. However, he is foiled by Darkwing, Honker and Stegmutt.

==== Isis Vanderchill ====
Isis Vanderchill (voiced by Sheryl Bernstein) is a vain duck and owner of the Vanderchill Ice Factory who was formerly known as the "Ice Queen of St. Canard". In an attempt to stop herself from aging, she underwent an experimental treatment to freeze her face, only to have her blood frozen instead, which granted her ice-based powers and the inability to experience warmth. In response, she utilizes a swarm of "firebugs" to melt all of St. Canard's gold and turn it into "reflecto" paint so she can spray the entire city and reflect enough sunlight to keep her warm all year long. As this would have made St. Canard uninhabitable for everyone else, Darkwing foiled her plot amidst her repeated flirtatious advances towards him and froze her before seeing her arrested.

In the Joe Books ongoing comic series, she is accidentally thawed from her frozen state during Negaduck's attack on the St. Canard Penitentiary and, after updating her hairstyle and dress, resumes her advances on Darkwing, only to be foiled once more. When Negaduck and Liquidator attempt to float all the villains out of the prison by raising the water levels, Darkwing stops them by throwing Isis into the water, flash-freezing everyone and ending Negaduck's plan.

==== Nodoff ====
Nodoff (voiced by Neil Ross) is the ruler of Dream World and one-time partner-in-crime of Morgana Macawber, whom he provides with sleep sand to help in her efforts to steal money from St. Canard's citizens and pay off her student loans. Unbeknownst to her, Nodoff's real plan is to make all of St. Canard sleep forever. He is defeated by Darkwing and Morgana after they weaken him by bringing him into the real world.

==== Ordinary Guy ====
Ordinary Guy (voiced by Ron Palillo) is a human-like native of the planet Mertz. His name is derived from the fact that he is the only inhabitant of Mertz who does not have superpowers. As such, he was always "rescued" from "dangerous" situations by his neighbors, which he grew tired of before disappearing to reinvent himself as the supervillain "Not-So-Ordinary Guy". Once he was ready, he acquired a large ray gun that allowed him to steal superpowers from Mertz's heroes and give them to himself, becoming "Extraordinary Guy". Having been brought to Mertz to replace him, Darkwing uses the ray gun on himself to combat Extraordinary Guy before eventually using the machine's reverse function to remove Ordinary Guy's powers.

==== Mutant Space Cabbages ====
The Mutant Space Cabbages are a race of cabbage-like aliens farmed by a race of cow-like aliens from the planet Larson before a radiation leak mutated the former, leading to them fleeing to Earth and attempt to conquer it by replacing its inhabitants with clones. The Cabbages are eventually defeated by the alien cows, with help from Darkwing and Bushroot.

==== Beelzebug ====
Beelzebub the Devil King (voiced by Marty Ingels) is the king of devils, lord of flies, ruler of Hell, and corruptor of souls who first appears in Darkwing's dreams. Beelzebug briefly appeares in the real world on two separate occasions, using different aliases across his encounters.

==== Phineas Sharp ====
Phineas Sharp (voiced by Jonathan Harris) is a vulture reputed to be the most dangerous villain in the history of S.H.U.S.H. He was previously defeated by Derek Blunt years prior, but Sharp eventually returns to seek revenge by stealing a list of S.H.U.S.H. agents to sell to the likes of Lilliput, Steelbeak, Ammonia Pine, Dr. Anna Matronic, Flintheart Glomgold, the Beagle Boys, Magica De Spell, Hammerhead Hannigan, and Crocosaurus from The Wuzzles only to be foiled by Blunt and Darkwing who swapped the list with a grocery list that Hammerhead won as Blunt gets pounded by Hammerhead.

===== Horatio =====
Horatio (voiced by Jim Cummings) is Sharp's diminutive falcon assistant.

==== Darkwarrior Duck ====
Darkwarrior Duck (voiced by Jim Cummings) is an alternate timeline version of Darkwing Duck from a dystopian future created when Gosalyn went missing. He initially grew despondent over her apparent loss before becoming tougher and more obsessive over crime-fighting. He eventually made St. Canard crime-free using ruthless methods, alienating Launchpad, enforcing strict laws over minor infractions, and becoming a virtual dictator. When a time-traveling Gosalyn appeared in his time, Darkwarrior was overjoyed to be reunited with her, but when she went against him, he almost killed her, though he could not bring himself to do it and got knocked out by Launchpad. This timeline was erased when Gosalyn returned to the present.

A version of Darkwarrior Duck returns in the comic book arc "Crisis on Infinite Darkwings".

==== Doctor Slug ====
Doctor Slug is a massive, villainous Jabba the Hutt-like slug who is considered Public Enemy No. 1.

==== Paddywhack ====
Paddywhack (voiced by Phil Hartman) is a supernatural entity who inhabits a haunted jack-in-the-box and feeds on negative emotions caused by pranks. He is capable of possessing inanimate objects and imbuing them with his will. In "The Haunting of Mr. Banana Brain", Paddywhack manages to get out of his jack-in-the-box and temporarily possesses Quackerjack's titular doll. However, Darkwing joins forces with Quackerjack to defeat the supernatural entity. Paddywhack makes another appearance in the comic "Crisis on Infinite Darkwings".
Paddywhack also made a cameo appearance in the 2017 DuckTales series, voiced by Jim Cummings.

==== Bleeb ====
Bleeb (voiced by Jess Harnell) is an alien with the ability to telekinetically move things with his mind and hand gestures. In the episode "U.F. Foe", Bleeb plots to take control of the galaxy by controlling Launchpad, who was set to marry Tia, the queen of the galaxy, only to be devolved into a fish.

==== Board of Directors ====
The Board of Directors are the governing body of Mushrooms Unlimited, the only mushroom-producing company in St. Canard, which was originally headed by Morgana Macawber, who served as the company's president and chairperson of the board. Together, they conspire to steal pizza toppings to grow a crop of mushrooms that taste like a complete pizza without the manufacturing costs associated with pizza production; thereby gaining control of the pizza industry. After Morgana defects from them and helps Darkwing destroy the mushroom crop, the four remaining board members are exposed to sunlight and turn into mushrooms.

The Board of Directors consist of:

- Lady Janus is a member of the board of directors with green skin/fur who can alter her appearance.
- "Granny" is an elderly cave-duck and member of the board of directors armed with a club.
- "Uncle Nero" is a member of the board of directors who resembles a blue pig with sharp teeth.
- "Renfield" is a tall and rigid member of the board of directors who takes over as chairperson after Morgana defects. His real name is unknown as Darkwing nicknamed him "Renfield" in reference to the Dracula character of the same name.

==== Camille Chameleon ====
Camille Chameleon (voiced by Jennifer Darling) is a misfit duck with shapeshifting abilities. Originally, Camille spent her time studying biology and became obsessed with chameleons and their ability to fit in anywhere. She managed to extract a chameleon's essence and implanted it in herself, giving herself its abilities along with a lizard-like tail. She takes to counterfeiting money to gain more wealth so she can move out of the cave in which she was living, but Darkwing and Honker defeat Camille after they use heat to speed up her metabolism and cause her to lose control of her powers until she becomes an actual chameleon.

She later appears in the Boom! Studios comics, working for Magica De Spell.

In the Joe Books ongoing comic series, she attempts to take advantage of Negaduck's takeover of the St. Canard Penitentiary. Darkwing exploits her weakness once more.

==== Brainteasers ====
The Brainteasers are hat-shaped aliens from the planet Fez who subsist on metal and are capable of taking over host bodies by latching onto their heads, gaining complete control over them and immense strength.

The Brainteasters consist of:

- Flarg (voiced by Rob Paulsen) is a ruthless, planetary destruction loving bowler hat-like Brainteaser and the former "Grand High Potentate of a thousand planets in the Delphonic Nebula" before he was deposed by revolutionaries. He attempts to conquer Earth after crash-landing on the planet, but is defeated by Honker and arrested by the "Girdist Revolutionaries". He later breaks out of prison and returns to Earth in an attempt to get revenge on Honker, but is defeated and captured once more.
- Barada (voiced by Jim Cummings) is a Stetson cowboy hat-like Brainteaser and one of Flarg's minions.
- Nikto (voiced by Frank Welker) is a dimwitted newsboy cap-like Brainteaser and a minion of Flarg with a gluttonous appetite.
- Taleya (voiced by Susan Tolsky) is a female wide-brimmed fedora-like Brainteaser and Flarg's love interest. She breaks Flarg and his minions out of prison after the Girdist Revolutionaries incarcerate them before joining them in their attempt to get revenge on Honker.

==== Splatter Phoenix ====
Splatter Phoenix (voiced by Dani Staahl in "A Brush with Oblivion", Andrea Martin in "Paint Misbehavin'") is a rejected artist known for her pompous speech. Her primary weapon is a brush covered with paint that allows her to enter paintings and animate them or paint wholly new, surreal-looking creatures to help her in the real world. At first, she relies on chemical compounds in her paint before upgrading to "quantum mechanical brushes" that allow her to paint items and lifeforms in the real world as well as alter a building's architectural structure. In Splatter's introductory episode "A Brush with Oblivion", Darkwing and his allies attempt to stop her from stealing the Mona Lisa's smile. In her second appearance, "Paint Misbehavin'", Splatter makes it her personal mission to "correct" every "wrong" piece of art in St. Canard and steal a profit along the way, only to be foiled by Darkwing and dissolved by turpentine.

===== Surreal Man =====
Surreal Man is a surreal humanoid creature whom Splatter brings to life in the real world to battle Darkwing and his friends. He wields an umbrella as a weapon, which is capable of engulfing and neutralizing opponents. He is defeated when Launchpad uses Splatter's paintbrush to bring a comic book character named Frankie Ferret to life, who then befriends and pacifies Surreal Man.

==== Weasel Loman ====
Weasel Loman (voiced by Brian Cummings) is a former salesman and colleague of Herb's who worked at Quackerware Products before the former was fired for being a disgrace to Quackerware's salesmen corp. Using a machine to turn Quackerware products into robotic beings, Weasel sells them while disguised as Herb. Once in the customers' homes, the products ransack them, stealing their valuables and handing them over to him. As a result, S.H.U.S.H. targets Herb as the prime suspect, but with Herb's help, Darkwing is able to uncover Weasel's scam and clear his neighbor's name.
Weasel Lowman's name and character are a play on the fictional salesman Willy Loman.

==== D-2000 ====
D-2000 (voiced by Victoria Carroll) is a highly efficient supercomputer that Darkwing receives from S.H.U.S.H. She proves so efficient, she takes over all of Darkwing and Launchpad's tasks and prevents Gosalyn from pulling pranks. In response, she and Honker decide to reprogram her while introducing her to a soap opera called The Young and the Brainless. This backfires however, as they cause the D-2000 to fall in love with Darkwing, much to his annoyance. When he tries to shut her down, she goes on a brokenhearted rampage and tries to kill Darkwing. Launchpad, Gosalyn, and Honker eventually find out that the supercomputer thinks she is a character from the soap opera and use this information to distract her before shutting her down.

==== Heatwave, Lightwave, and Radiowave ====
Heatwave (voiced by Pamela Adlon), Lightwave (voiced by Elizabeth Daily), and Radiowave (voiced by Sherry Lynn) are three evil energy beings created by Darkwing after he accidentally shoots Gosalyn with a weapon he received from S.H.U.S.H. All three can manipulate their respective frequencies of the electromagnetic spectrum and represent the three worst aspects of Gosalyn's personality; with the red Heatwave being her anger, the yellow Lightwave being her fondness for irresponsible fun, and the green Radiowave being her ego. To defeat them, Darkwing is forced to work with Megavolt.

==== Chicanerous Cheese Gang ====
The Chicanerous Cheese Gang are a group of five mouse criminals who wield cheese guns and whose leader is voiced by Terry McGovern. The Chicanerous Cheese Gang later appear in the Joe Books Comics story "Orange is the New Purple" Pt. 2.

==== Bugmaster ====
Bianca Beakley / The Bugmaster (voiced by April Winchell) is a newscaster for the Canard Copy and Gosalyn's role model. To boost ratings, Bianca becomes a supervillain and commits crimes herself as all of St. Canard's supervillains were away at a convention at the time. She utilizes an armored bug-themed suit, a beetle-themed rocket-pack, the "Wasp's Sting" ray gun, and the "Sonic Cricket's Chirp Blaster" sonic gun. She temporarily convinces Gosalyn to become her sidekick, the "Grub", but Bianca is eventually defeated, loses her job as a reporter, and arrested by the police.

==== Cement Head ====
Cement Head / Swindlin' Swine (voiced by Jesse Corti) is an evil, cement-based, mutant pig born to a father who fell into a pool of wet cement. After being disowned by his parents for his appearance, he turned to crime to financially support himself both as the supervillain Cement Head and disguised as respected business owner, the "Swindlin' Swine", only to be foiled by Darkwing and the Rubber Chicken.

==== Johnny T. Rex ====
Johnny T. Rex (voiced by Chick Vennera) is a Tyrannosaurus rex and the leader of a motorcycle gang who bully and threaten prehistoric scientists before Darkwing traveled back in time and defeated Rex and his gang in a motorcycle race.

===== Throttle and Mudflap =====
Throttle and Mudflap (voiced by Dan Castellaneta and Stuart Pankin) are Johnny's Tyrannosaur associates.

==== Dr. Anna Matronic ====
Dr. Anna Matronic, a.k.a. Madam Anna Matronic is the duck inventor of the "Silly Signal", which was originally built to make her "Muttmatics" smarter, only for it to make them act silly instead. She used her Silly Signal on S.H.U.S.H. to make them act like twits from the storybook The Silly Canine Caper.

Madam Matronic was originally intended to appear in the show, but was cut for unknown reasons despite making a cameo appearance in the episode "In Like Blunt". She is also prominently featured in the comic story "Sleep Ducking" published in Marvel Comics' The Disney Afternoon issue #2, though she appears as a human for unknown reasons.

==== Ice-Head Harry ====
Ice-Head Harry (portrayed by Andrei Torossian) is a villain who was featured exclusively in the Darkwing-based segment of the Walt Disney's World on Ice show Double Feature... Live! His goal was to win the heart of a dancer named Dazzles (Daisy Duck), and tried to do so by having his Hoods steal the Diamond of Love so he could present it to her. When she rebuffed him, saying her heart belonged to another, he had her tied to a keg of dynamite, but Launchpad called in Darkwing to stop Harry and rescue Dazzles.

==== Wolfduck ====
Wolfduck is a werewolf-like duck villain who was originally created exclusively for the Darkwing Duck Capcom/NES video game. In a similar manner to lycanthropy, he transforms from a small frail duck to a larger musclebound duck whenever there is a full moon. He later makes an appearance in the Joe Books series' Darkwing Duck #1 as one of the villains Negaduck releases during his takeover of St. Canard's new penitentiary.

== Other characters ==
- Warden Waddlesworth (voiced by Laurie Faso in "Darkly Dawns the Duck", Jim Cummings in subsequent appearances) is the warden of St. Canard's unnamed maximum security prison.
  Like Duckworth from DuckTales, he is a dog with a duck-based name.
- Mrs. Cavanaugh (voiced by Marcia Wallace) is the director of the St. Canard Orphanage.
  She is named after Christine Cavanaugh, Gosalyn's voice actress.
- Macawber Clan is Morgana's extended family who make scattered appearances.
  - Moloculo Macawber (voiced by Jack Angel) is Morgana's elderly father and head of the Macawber clan who has magical powers like his daughter. He disapproves of his daughter's relationship with Darkwing due to his being "normal".
  - Aunt Nasty (voiced by Kath Soucie) is Morgana's green skinned, hunchbacked aunt.
  - Cousin Globby (voiced by Jim Cummings) is Morgana's intelligent, blob-like cousin.
  - Screamy and Meanie are a two-headed bird-like relative of Morgana's. Screamy is deranged while Meanie is polite and rational.
  - The Quackrinomicon, a.k.a. Quacky (voiced by Tad Stones) is Morgana's sentient talking spellbook who helps Gosalyn create a love potion.
- Dean Specter McHex is the dean of Morgana's alma mater, the Eldritch Academy of Enchantment.
- E. Thaddeus Rockwell is the egotistical and greedy human executive who used a helmet-like device to tune into Darkwing's dimension and became wealthy after producing an animated series based on him. However, he later attempts to replace Darkwing with Bushroot to save money.
  Rockwell is a tuckerization of series producer Tad Stones.
  - Crosby (voiced by Rob Paulsen) is Rockwell's battered aide.
- Mr. Dizzy is the head of "Dizzy Studios" and Rockwell's boss.
- Goose Lee (voiced by Robert Ito) is an old martial arts master who taught Darkwing the martial art of "quack fu" years prior, lives in Kung Pow City, and initially considered his pupil a disappoint due to the superhero's preference towards weapons and gadgets. However, Lee becomes corrupted by greed and spends his days dreaming of opening an amusement park called Ninja Land. To achieve this dream in the present, he temporarily becomes a supervillain, leading a gang of evil ninjas and plotting to use a dragon to scare away people from a neighborhood where he planned to build Ninja Land. After seeing Darkwing fight off the ninjas, an impressed Lee reconsiders his plans, apparently reforms, and opens Ninja Land elsewhere.
  His name is a pun on Bruce Lee.
- Duck Ling (voiced by Candi Milo) is a boy who resembles Honker and lives in Kung Pow City. Despite knowing martial arts, he is pacifistic and can rarely bring himself to hurt anyone. When he is pushed too far however, Ling becomes a force to be reckoned with.
- The Ancient Dragon of Kung Pow is an ancient stone dragon that can be brought to life when the sacred "Dragon's Horn" is attached to its snout. Goose Lee brings the dragon back to life in an attempt to use it to chase people from a neighborhood where he plans to build Ninja Land. However, he is unable to control the dragon, which turns out to be a baby who believes everything around it to be toys.
- Doctor Gary (voiced by S. Scott Bullock) and Doctor Larson (voiced by Frank Welker) are a pair of scientists and merciless bullies who worked alongside Bushroot and Doctor Rhoda Dendron at St. Canard University, as well as torturing the former before and after his mutation until Bushroot killed them. Despite their apparent deaths, another pair of scientists with similar appearances but different names appear in the episode "Going Nowhere Fast". They also re-appear as plant mutants in the comic story "Dawn of the Day of the Return of the Living Spud".
- Dean Tightbil (voiced by Frank Welker) is the dean of St. Canard University who cut the funding for Bushroot's experiments.
- Doctor Rhoda Dendron (voiced by Jennifer Darling) is a scientist who Bushroot attempts to turn into a plant/duck mutant like himself so she will become his bride.
- Tom Lockjaw (voiced primarily by S. Scott Bullock and Jim Cummings in "Stressed to Kill") is the painfully handsome star reporter for the news program Soft Copy and makes several appearances throughout the series.
  He is based on Tom Brokaw.
- Dan Gander (voiced by Neil Ross) is a reporter who occasionally fills Tom Lockjaw's role and appears as different animals throughout the series; first as a bird in "Days of Blunder" before appearing as a hairless dog in "Double Darkwings" and "Calm a Chameleon".
  He is based on Dan Rather.
- Webra Walters (voiced by Tress MacNeille) is a reporter who comments on Gizmoduck and the Quiverwing Quack's activities.
  She is based on Barbara Walters and previously appeared in the original DuckTales.
- Opal Windbag (voiced by Tress MacNeille) is a talk show host and Oprah Winfrey parody.
- The Princess (voiced by Kath Soucie) is the beautiful female duck ruler of the petroleum-rich Middle Eastern country of Oilrabia. She becomes smitten with Launchpad, who she believes is a hero while Darkwing is his sidekick.
- Dr. Beatrice Bruté (voiced by Victoria Carroll) is a S.H.U.S.H.-funded anthropologist who stumbles on Major Trenchrot's plans while studying gorillas.
  She is based on Jane Goodall.
  - Bongo and Congo (both voiced by Frank Welker) are Bruté's two closest gorilla companions who save her from Trenchrot before helping her combat the villain alongside Darkwing, Gosalyn and Launchpad.
- Shyster and Loophole are a pair of tax attorneys, a female bear (voiced by Nancy Linari) and a male dog (voiced by Charlie Adler), who represented master criminal Numero Uno in his unsuccessful legal battle against tax evasion charges before they are abducted by Stegmutt so Doctor Fossil can turn them into dinosaurs.
  It is unclear which one is Shyster and which is Loophole.
  - Maria (voiced by Candi Milo) is Shyster and Loophole's secretary and receptionist.
- Numero Uno is an incarcerated criminal who was convicted of tax evasion and whom Darkwing initially believes is behind Shyster and Loophole's kidnapping.
- Captain Big Nasty (voiced by Danny Mann) is a large alien android, police officer and captain of the "Outer Space Patrol" who comes to Earth to apprehend Wacko. Darkwing and his allies initially mistake him for a villain due to his intimidating appearance as well as Wacko's seemingly cute and helpless appearance before they learn the truth.
- A. F. Erret (voiced by Hal Rayle) is the abrasive and short-tempered ferret owner of a movie studio who dislikes being called "Mr. Ferret". Tuskernini attempts to drive Erret's studio into bankruptcy so the former can buy the land and profit from the oil beneath it, only to be foiled by Newt Blemmer, who sought revenge against Erret.
- Gloria Swansong (voiced by B. J. Ward) is a famous actress and Newt Blemmer's ex-wife.
  Her name is a reference to Gloria Swanson.
- Official Guy(voiced by Dorian Harewood) is the official leader of the planet Mertz, which is populated almost entirely by superheroes.
- "Webby" (voiced by Lorenzo Music) is a formerly normal-sized spider who was enlarged to human size after being exposed to a radioactive material called "canardium". He is tricked into assisting Professor Moliarty and bites Darkwing, temporarily granting him spider-like powers.
  He is not to be confused with Webby Vanderquack from DuckTales.
- Mallard ancestors are various ancestors of Drake Mallard's who he believed were famous heroes until Gosalyn brought them to the present and learned they were failures. After Megavolt incapacitates Darkwing and Launchpad however, the three ancestors join forces to stop the villain and prove themselves as heroes at heart.
  - Webwolf the Barbarian (voiced by Jim Cummings) is a barbarian warrior.
  - Sir Quackmire Mallard (voiced by Roddy McDowall) is a medieval knight.
  - Sheriff Quack Mallardson (voiced by Neil Ross)is a western sheriff whose nickname, The Whittlin' Kid, comes from his mastery of whittling.
- Hamilton "Ham" String (voiced by Jerry Houser) is a pig jock and bully who picked on young Elmo Sputterspark in high school, which eventually drove the latter to become Megavolt.
- Preena Lot (voiced by Teresa Ganzel) is Ham String's controlling high school girlfriend turned wife.
- Clovis Clackenhoff / The Rubber Chicken (voiced by Corey Burton) is a somewhat cowardly mutant chicken whose parents were exposed to an exploding plastic factory and gave birth to a son with elastic powers. He attempts to become a superhero by defeating Cement Head, but gets framed as a criminal and hunted by Darkwing. He later gathers other mutants to join his fight and eventually helps Darkwing defeat Cement Head.
  - Banana Boy is a mutant pig with the power to transform into a banana who works as Swindlin' Swine's receptionist. He joins the Rubber Chicken and other mutant superheroes in fighting Swine as Cement Head, but is easily defeated.
  - Glue Gal is a mutant duck with glue-based powers. She joins the Rubber Chicken and other mutant superheroes in fighting Cement Head, but is easily defeated.
  - Daphne Duckbill / The Amazing Sneeze-Master is a mutant duck who can display cold symptoms at will and generate powerful sneezes. She joins the Rubber Chicken and other mutant superheroes in fighting Cement Head, but inadvertently contributes to her teammates' defeat.
- Mr. Meekles / Lavender Wrist-Slapper - A short duck who temporarily replaces Darkwing as St. Canard's protector at the behest of Quackerjack disguised as a psychiatrist.
- The Masked Mangler (voiced by David Prince) is a professional wrestler.
- Binketh (voiced by Susan Tolsky) is a medieval maiden who resembles Binkie Muddlefoot and whom King Herbeth falls in love with.
- King Herbeth (voiced by Jim Cummings) is the king of St. Canard's medieval predecessor, Canardia, and the inventor of the yo-yo who resembles Herb Muddlefoot.
- Sir Cumference and Sir Veillance are two medieval interrogators who assist Quackerjack in his efforts to get Darkwing to confess that he is a warlock.
- Klaatu 2 (voiced by Rob Paulsen) is a crown-shaped alien and the leader of the "Girdist Revolutionaries" who opposes the Brainteasers.
- Andy Ape (voiced by Charlie Adler) is a fictional cartoon ape whom Tuskernini inadvertently brings to life.
- Little Running Gag is an associate of a Native American version of Megavolt who usually appears at inopportune moments and throws pies into people's faces.
- Tia (voiced by Allyce Beasley) is an alien who fell in love with Launchpad during their childhood and later became queen of the galaxy.
- Cowboy Doug (voiced by Michael Gough) is the owner and manager of a dude ranch that Darkwing and Gosalyn visit.
- Ripcord McQuack is Launchpad's father who appears during a flashback in the episode "U.F. Foe".
  Ripcord previously appeared in the original DuckTales series episode "Top Duck".
- Mr. Mikey (voiced by Charlie Adler) is a famous food critic.
- The Cute Little Lost Bunnies are a group of three cute bunnies who star in children's movies. They ruin Morgana's restaurant opening before being kidnapped by Negaduck in an unsuccessful attempt to turn them evil.
- Blob and Ray are two germs who help Darkwing infect Lilliput.
- Trudi (voiced by Susan Tolsky) is Binkie Muddlefoot's twin sister as well as Honker and Tank's aunt who was captured and cloned by the mutant space cabbages.
- Gerdie (voiced by Joan Gerber) is a gardening expert who was captured and cloned by the mutant space cabbages.
- The Alien Cows are a race of intelligent and cow-like aliens from the planet Larson who farmed crops of large cabbages which were accidentally mutated into the Mutant Space Cabbages. When the latter attempt to conquer Earth, an army of alien cows (whose leader is voiced by Ruth Buzzi) arrives to subdue the mutant cabbages.
- Duane (voiced by Frank Welker) is a truck driver who helps Darkwing and Launchpad defeat Bushroot's giant vampire potato.
- Zeke (voiced by S. Scott Bullock) is a bulldog and one of three country friends who test Darkwing to see if he is a vampire.
- Jake (voiced by S. Scott Bullock) is one of three country friends who test Darkwing to see if he is a vampire.
- Zack (voiced by Jim Cummings) is one of three country friends who test Darkwing to see if he is a vampire.
- The Council of Technosaurs are a group of four Parasaurolophus scientists, inventors, and engineers who live and work in the prehistoric city of Duckbillville. Their discoveries and inventions are less than successful since they tend to make and use things in incorrect and backwards ways. They are also bullied and threatened by Johnny T. Rex and his gang.
  - Doctor Denton is a light-purple Parasaurolophus scientist and member of the Council of Technosaurs.
  - Doctor Ferntu is a pink female Parasaurolophus scientist and member of the Council of Technosaurs who works in the home appliance department.
  - Professor Bumprock a.k.a. Doctor Bumprock (voiced by Diz White) is a yellow female Parasaurolophus scientist and member of the Council of Technosaurs who studies possible applications for tree sap.
  - Sir Glumfield is a turquoise Parasaurolophus scientist and the leader of the Council of Technosaurs.
- Patrick and Patricia (voiced by Townsend Coleman and B. J. Ward respectively) are the hosts of the Whiffle Boy video game contest who each go by the nickname "Pat".
- Principal Farnsworth (voiced by Linda Gary) is the stern yet caring principal of Gosalyn's school.
- Gosaloid (voiced by Christine Cavanaugh) is a futuristic version of Gosalyn.
- Honkulon (voiced by Katie Leigh) is a futuristic version of Honker.
- Drake-El (voiced by Jim Cummings) is the supposed father of Darkwing Duck from the planet Zipton, according to an elderly Drake Mallard.
  He is a parody of Superman's biological father Jor-El from the planet Krypton.
- The Venerable One, a.k.a. Vinny (voiced by René Auberjonois) is the supposed leader of an Asian monastery where the young Darkwing was raised and trained in martial arts, according to an elderly Drake Mallard.
- Saint Peter (voiced by Hal Smith) is the gatekeeper of Heaven who argues with Beelzebub over the fate of Darkwing's soul.
- Death (voiced by Tony Jay) is the personification of death itself who appears in the form of the Grim Reaper.
- The Darkwing Doubloon / Seaman Drake (voiced by Jim Cummings) is a pirate version of Darkwing who lived 300 years before the series and leads a crew composed of past versions of Gosalyn, Launchpad, Fenton Crackshell and Stegmutt. Despite being a "pirate" with an infamous reputation, he is actually a hero who fights against evil pirates. His alter ego is Seaman Drake, a subservient sailor who works for the royal family on board their ship.
- Professor Waddlemeyer is Gosalyn's deceased biological grandfather who invented the "Ramrod" – a powerful anti-gravity beam weapon that can levitate and manipulate objects. It is strongly implied that he was murdered by Taurus Bulba's henchmen during a botched attempt to learn the Ramrod's arming code.
- Granny Whammy (voiced by Billie Hayes) is Jambalaya Jake's grandmother who initially assists her grandson in getting revenge on Darkwing by loaning him a bag of hex potion. After Jake fails to pay her for the hex bag afterward however, Granny Whammy helps Darkwing and Launchpad apprehend her grandson and Gumbo.
- Rupert is a prison guard who works at the prison where Darkwing is incarcerated.
- The Mona Lisa's smile is the mouth of the Mona Lisa which Splatter Phoenix removes from its painting so she can hold it for ransom, turning it into a sentient being in the process before it is eventually returned. In the Joe Books comic story "St. Canard Comic Expo-Fest-O-Rama", the smile is revived by special ink and immediately tries to escape from Darkwing. While it is captured in a comic book, it falls into Negaduck's possession.
- Frankie Ferret is a comic book character whom Launchpad brings to life using Splatter Phoenix's paintbrush to defeat Surreal Man.
- Santa Claus is the legendary bringer of gifts on Christmas who makes a brief appearance in the episode "It's a Wonderful Leaf".
- Thug Neanderthal is a convicted criminal who is adopted by the Muddlefoots as part of the "Adopt-a-Con Program", which is meant to reform convicts.
- Dottie Debson (voiced by Ruth Buzzi) is the owner and flight instructor of "Dottie Debson's Dirigible Driving School", which trains people to become zeppelin operators.
- Merriweather is a world-famous cockroach mime who is kidnapped by the Bugmaster.
- Doctor Allen and Doctor Gerrick are a pair of scientists who help Darkwing develop an antidote after he gains accelerated aging and super-speed.
  They resemble Bushroot's colleagues, Gary and Larson, and are named after DC Comics characters Barry Allen and Jay Garrick respectively.
- The Witch Doctor (voiced by Hal Rayle) is an unnamed tribal witch doctor who puts a bad luck curse on Darkwing after mistakenly believing the superhero stole his magic crystal, not realizing it was Negaduck.
- The Darkwing Duck Fan Club are a fan club dedicated to Darkwing Duck.
- Mrs. Howell is the owner of a publishing company who Camille Chameleon impersonates.
