= Bonnie Gallanter =

American music manager

Bonnie Gallanter is a music manager and the President/CEO of Muse Artist Management.

== Career ==
Gallanter's clients have included former Sugar Beats and Dream Street member and the WB's "Summerland" superstar Jesse McCartney (ended 2007), "Making The Band 3's" Denosh, Speed Racer co-star Paulie Litt, Second Nature, Disney's T-Squad, Sugar Beats and 4 time #1, Billboard Award-winning songwriter/producer Eddie Galan of Mach 1 Music. Sugar Beats' four albums have sold more than one million units on their own label.

Bonnie has also managed The Broadway Kids, distributed by Lightyear Entertainment from 1994 until 2005. Broadway Kids alumni include but are not limited to: Ashley Tisdale (The Suite Life of Zack & Cody, High School Musical, and Phineas and Ferb star), Andrea Bowen (Desperate Housewives), Christy Carlson Romano (Kim Possible, Even Stevens, The Even Stevens Movie, and Cadet Kelly), Lacey Chabert (Family Guy and Mean Girls, Party of Five), Kathryn Zaremba, Andrea Bowen, and Greg Raposo and the late Chris Trousdale (Dream Street).

Bonnie Gallanter was also the Vice President of the Sugar Beats record label.
