= With All My Heart (disambiguation) =

"With All My Heart" is an English-language version, first recorded by Jodie Sands in 1957, of the French song "Gondolier" by Dalida.

With All My Heart may also refer to:

- With All My Heart (Frankie Laine album) or the title song, 1955
- With All My Heart (Harvey Mason album), 2004
- With All My Heart (Romanz album) or the title song, 2012
- With All My Heart, an album by Gogi Grant, 2009
- "With All My Heart", a song by Dionne Warwick from Why We Sing, 2008
- "With All My Heart", a song by Dream Street from their self titled debut album and from the 2005 film The Biggest Fan.
