= Toothless =

Toothless may refer to:

- Edentulism, the condition of toothlessness
- Toothless (film), a 1997 made-for-TV fantasy film
- Toothless, a main dragon character from the How To Train Your Dragon franchise and book series
