= Katie Neil =

American singer

- Born: 1989 (age 36–37)
- Genres: Pop rock
- Occupations: Singer-songwriter, former actress
- Years active: 2003–present
- Website: Official site, Official fansite, and Official MySpace

Katie Neil (born in 1989) is an American pop rock singer-songwriter and former actress.

== Biography ==
=== Early career ===
At the age of 8, Neil began working in Broadway and singing and acting in many shows. She worked with Community theatre and with the Kennedy Center for a while. At the age of 10, she moved to Manhattan. After a year on Broadway and with all of the performances she did, Neil began to get more into singing and pop music. This is when she released her debut album, How I Feel with Cliff Downs. Later, she released Second Story with Chris Griffin, then In Transit.

=== Roles on Broadway ===
- Appearance with the Royal Shakespeare Company at the Kennedy Center (age 8)
- Washington Opera's Boris Godunov (Plácido Domingo, artistic director)
- The Nutcracker, with the Stanislavski Ballet, at the Kennedy Center
- Annie Get Your Gun, playing "Jessie Oakley" opposite Bernadette Peters (age 10)
- Fiddler on the Roof in Ocean City, New Jersey (ensemble role)
- Winnow Winds in Martinsburg, West Virginia (lead role)
- The Secret Garden, Philadelphia (playing the lead role, Mary Lennox)
- Broadway Kids recording of "America Sings"

== Discography ==
=== How I Feel ===
When Neil was just 13, in 2003, she released her first album, How I Feel, produced by Cliff Downs.

Track listing:

1. "It's Alright to Breakdown Sometimes"
2. "How I Feel"
3. "My Friend Nikki"
4. "Till You Need Me"
5. "Where the Sadness Dies"
6. "Do Without You"
7. "Everywhere You Go"
8. "Guess I Never Loved You"
9. " Can We Go the Distance"
10. "Buses and Trains"
11. "Far Away From Here"

=== Second Story ===
At age 15, in 2005, Neil came out with her first EP, entitled Second Story, produced and mixed by Chris Griffin.

Track listing:

1. "Stripped Down"
2. "Go Away"
3. "It's Not the Same"
4. "The Real Me"
5. "School Daze"

=== In Transit ===
Neil released her second EP in June 2006, entitled In Transit.

Track listing:

1. "Stupid Ex Boyfriend"
2. "Bad For You"
3. "Good Day Down"
4. "Unspoken"
5. "You're Not the Only One".

The song "Stupid Ex Boyfriend" was a featured "Hip Clipz" tune on the website of Curly Grrlz Skateboards.

== Personal life ==
Neil currently resides in an apartment building with her parents in New York City, where she is attending high school.
