= Salesian High School (New York) =

Location
- 148 East Main Street; New Rochelle, (Westchester), New York 10801; United States; 40°55′0″N 73°46′7″W

Information
- Type: Private high school
- Religious affiliation: Roman Catholic
- Established: 1920 (106 years ago)
- Oversight: Salesians of Don Bosco
- NCES School ID: 00921757
- President: Fr. Jim Heuser, SDB
- Principal: Cynthia Chambers
- Teaching staff: 32.3 (on an FTE basis)
- Grades: 9–12
- Gender: Boys
- Enrollment: 383 (2021-2022)
- Student to teacher ratio: 16.3
- Campus type: Suburban
- Colors: Royal blue, pitch black, and white
- Athletics conference: Catholic High School Athletic Association
- Nickname: Eagles
- Accreditation: Middle States Association of Colleges and Schools
- Website: salesianhigh.org

Salesian High School (SHS) is an American private high school for boys in New Rochelle, New York.

It was established in 1920 and is part of the Salesians of Don Bosco. It is located in the Roman Catholic Archdiocese of New York.

The school is located on the waterfront along Long Island Sound on the former estate of John Stephenson, the inventor of the horse-drawn trolley car. The Stephenson Mansion, a historic home, took seven years to build during the 1860s at a reported cost of $250,000. After Stephenson's death in 1893, the property passed through several hands before the Salesians of Don Bosco bought it in 1919.

Today, the mansion is the headquarters of the Salesian Order's Eastern Province and is known as the Salesian Provincial Residence.

== Notable alumni ==
- Michael Breen, lead announcer and sports commentator for the NBA
- Frankie J. Galasso, actor and musician best known as a member of the boy band Dream Street
- Eric Mobley, NBA player
- Louis D'Esposito, co-president of Marvel Studios
