= Mickey, Donald, Goofy: The Three Musketeers =

- VHS and DVD cover
- Directed by: Donovan Cook
- Screenplay by: Evan Spiliotopoulos; David M. Evans
- Based on: The Three Musketeers by Alexandre Dumas; Mickey Mouse by; Walt Disney and; Ub Iwerks
- Produced by: Margot Pipkin
- Starring: Wayne Allwine; Tony Anselmo; Bill Farmer; Russi Taylor; Tress MacNeille; Jim Cummings; April Winchell; Jeff Bennett; Maurice LaMarche; Rob Paulsen; Jess Harnell
- Edited by: Bret Marnell
- Music by: Bruce Broughton
- Production company: Disneytoon Studios (Note: Animation outsourced to Toon City Animation.)
- Distributed by: Walt Disney Home Entertainment (Note: Released through the Walt Disney Pictures banner.)
- Release dates: August 17, 2004 (United States); September 13, 2004 (United Kingdom)
- Running time: 68 minutes
- Country: United States
- Language: English

Mickey, Donald, Goofy: The Three Musketeers, or simply The Three Musketeers, is a 2004 American animated direct-to-video musical adventure film based on the film adaptations of the 1844 novel The Three Musketeers by Alexandre Dumas and the Mickey Mouse film series by Walt Disney and Ub Iwerks, as well as its expanded universe. As the title suggests, it features Mickey Mouse, Donald Duck, and Goofy as the three musketeers in their first full-length feature film together. This film was directed by Donovan Cook, produced by Walt Disney Pictures and the Australian office of Disneytoon Studios. It was released directly to DVD and VHS on August 17, 2004, by Walt Disney Home Entertainment, and was later re-released on Blu-ray Disc on August 12, 2014, coinciding with the film's 10th anniversary.

The film received generally mixed reviews from critics, who praised its musical numbers, action sequences, and faithfulness to the original material, but were critical on other aspects.

== Plot ==
The Troubadour, a French music-loving tortoise, tells the tale of The Three Musketeers from his comic book. The story takes place in 17th-century France, where four young street urchins, Mickey Mouse, Donald Duck, Goofy, and Mickey's dog, Pluto, struggle to survive. One day, the four are harassed by the Beagle Boys before being saved by royal musketeers, who gift Mickey one of their hats, inspiring him and his friends to follow their example and become musketeers themselves.

Years later, Mickey, Donald, and Goofy are employed as janitors at the musketeers' headquarters, headed by Captain Peg Leg Pete, who is secretly plotting to overthrow Princess Minnie Mouse and become the King of France. One day, after Minnie narrowly avoids an assassination attempt by the Beagle Boys, who covertly work for Pete, she demands that Pete hire musketeer bodyguards for her. Realizing that hiring experienced musketeers would put his plan at risk, Pete decides to give the job to Mickey, Donald, and Goofy, believing that they would be easy to get rid of.

While on a carriage ride with Minnie and her lady-in-waiting, Daisy Duck, Mickey, Donald and Goofy are ambushed by the Beagle Boys, who incapacitate the trio and kidnap Minnie and Daisy. Refusing to give up, Mickey, Donald, and Goofy pursue the Beagle Boys to an abandoned tower, where they engage in another fight, which a frightened Donald quickly backs out of. Despite this, Mickey and Goofy manage to defeat the Beagle Boys without Donald and rescue Minnie and Daisy. Afterwards, Mickey and Minnie start a relationship.

Having learned of Mickey, Donald and Goofy's success, Pete decides to get rid of them individually. On the night of an opera, which Minnie and Daisy are attending, Goofy is lured away from the palace by Clarabelle Cow, Pete's lieutenant, while Donald is captured by the Beagle Boys, though he manages to escape. After being warned by Donald of Pete's betrayal, Mickey gets caught by Pete who imprisons him in a flooding dungeon at Mont Saint-Michel.

While Clarabelle attempts to drown Goofy in the Seine, she suddenly has a change of heart when they fall in love. After Goofy learns about Mickey's situation from Clarabelle, he travels to the dungeon where Mickey is being held captive, accompanied by Pluto and an initially reluctant Donald, who soon becomes reinvigorated after the Troubadour berates him for his cowardice. Donald and Goofy manage to rescue Mickey before the group proceed on their mission to rescue the princess.

At Palais Garnier, where the opera is being held, Pete and the Beagle Boys capture Minnie and Daisy, with one of the Beagle Boys masquerading as Minnie to declare Pete as the new King of France. Soon, Mickey, Donald, and Goofy arrive, and after an epic battle onstage, they defeat Pete and his minions and rescue Minnie and Daisy, who profess their love to Mickey and Donald, respectively. Later, Minnie officially dubs Mickey, Donald, and Goofy as royal musketeers, fulfilling their dream.

== Voice cast ==
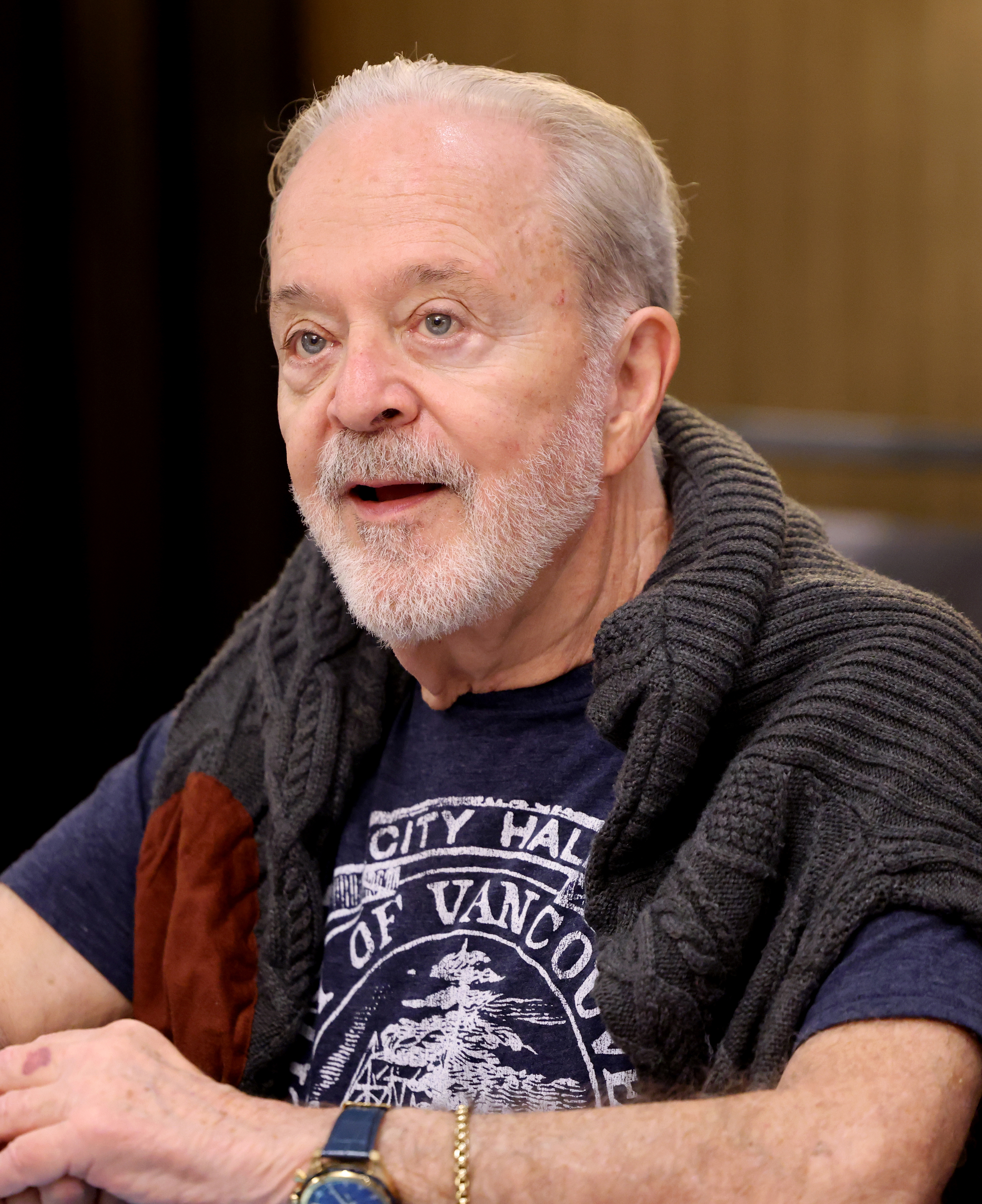
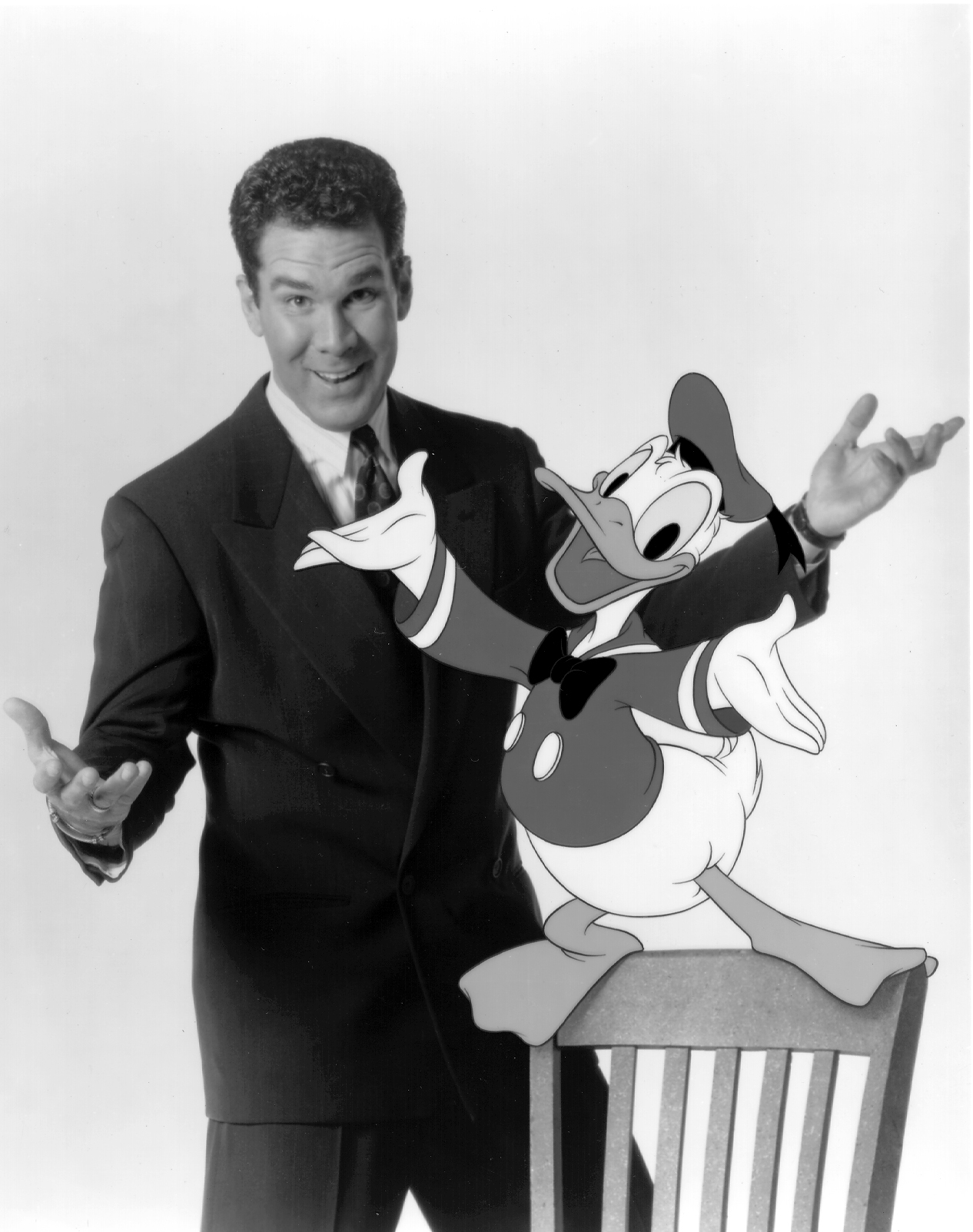
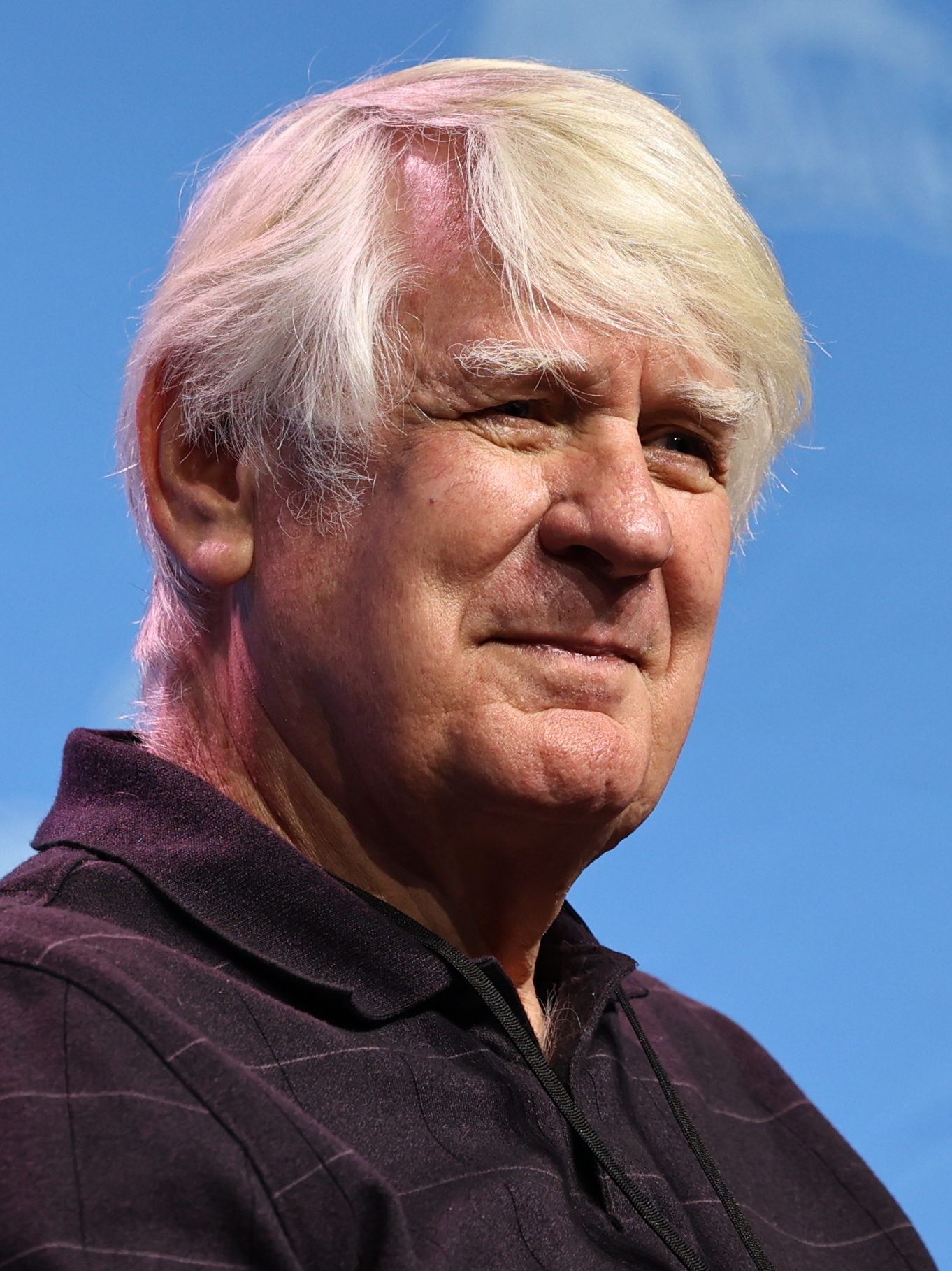
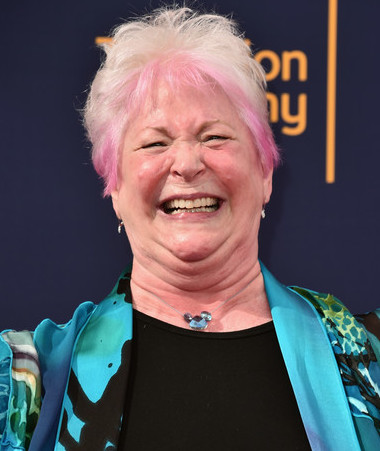
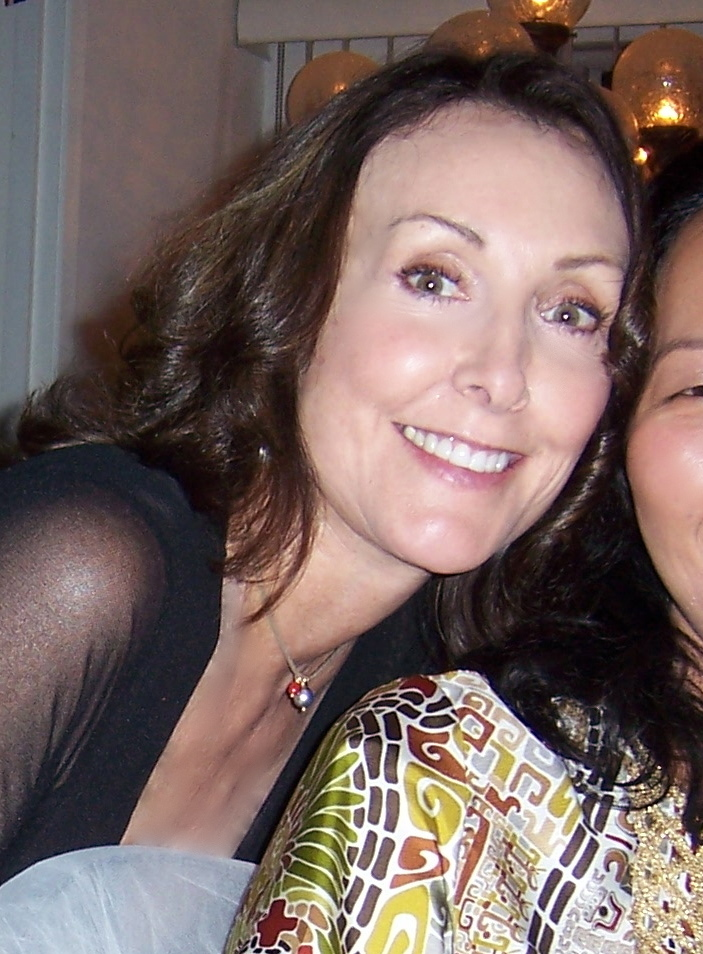
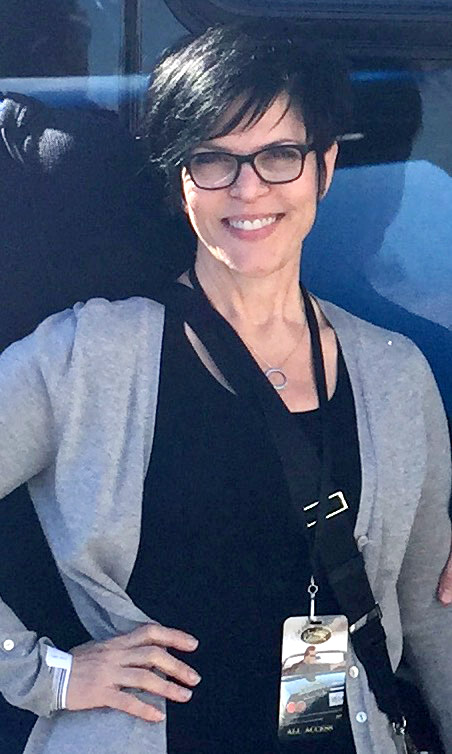
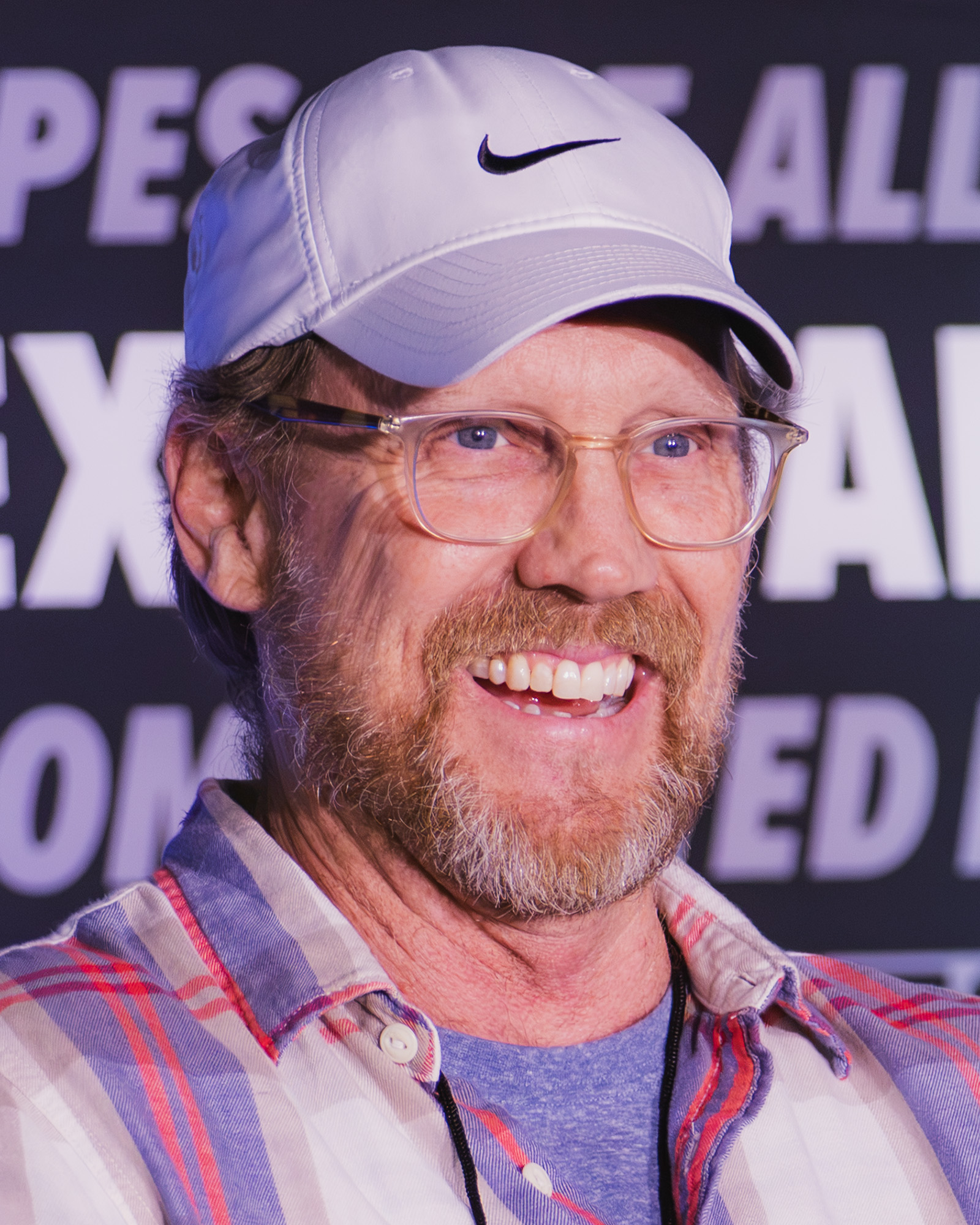
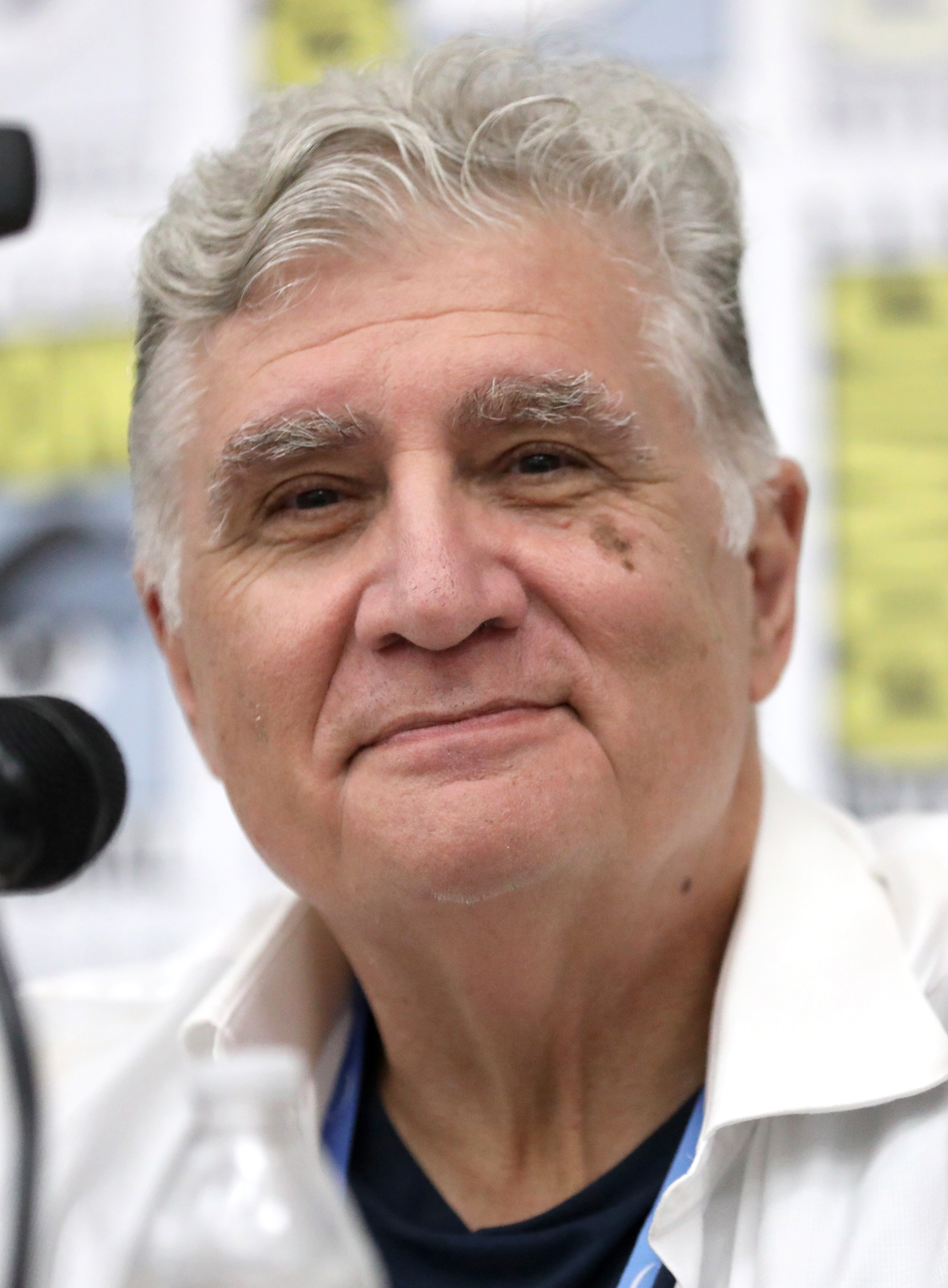
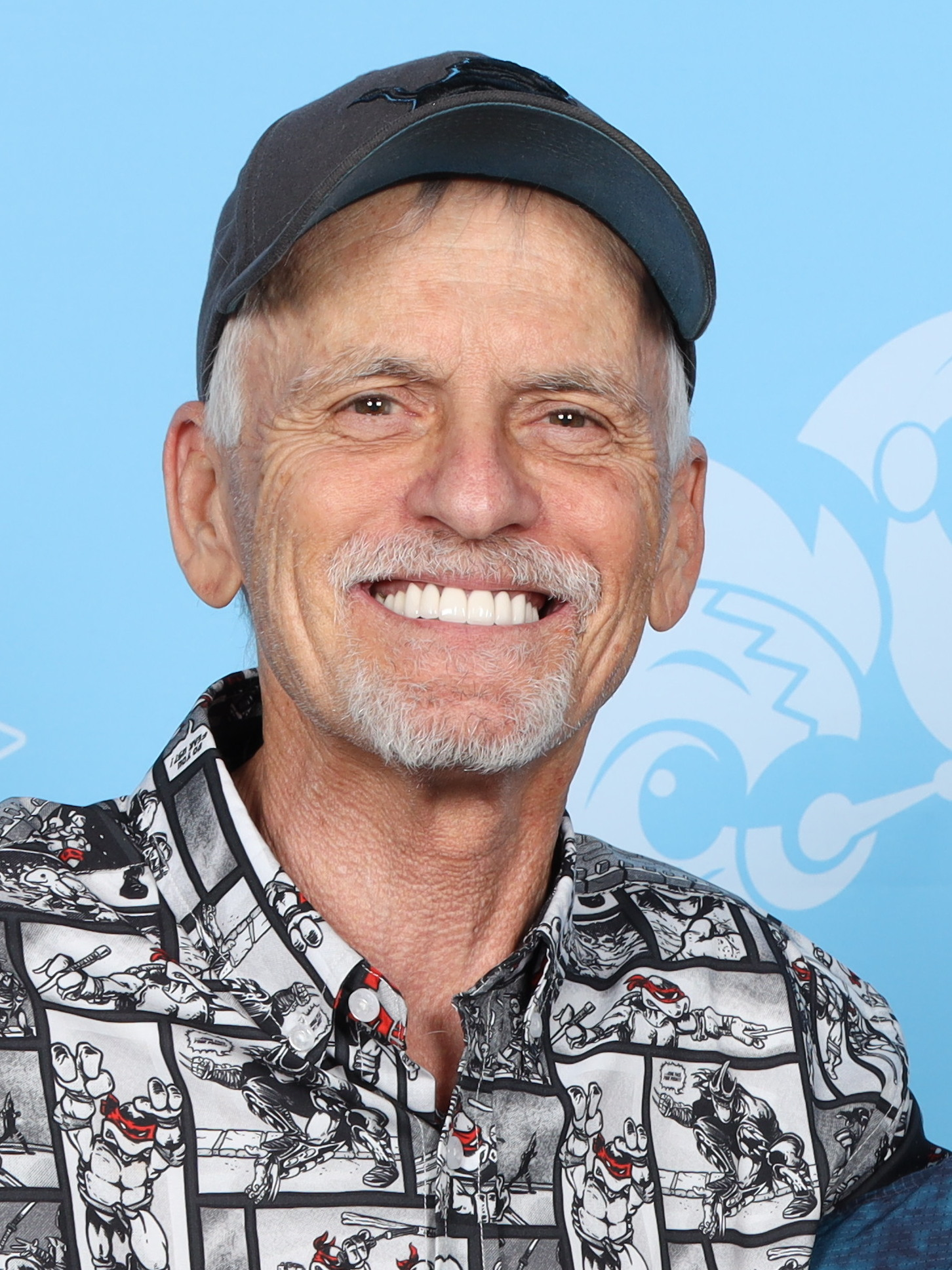
Jim Cummings (in 2025), Tony Anselmo (in 1998), Bill Farmer (in 2023), Russi Taylor (in 2018), Tress MacNeille (in 2007), April Winchell (in 2011), Jeff Bennett (in 2023), Maurice LaMarche (in 2023) and Rob Paulsen (in 2024)
- Wayne Allwine as Mickey Mouse
- Tony Anselmo as Donald Duck
- Bill Farmer as Goofy and Pluto
- Russi Taylor as Minnie Mouse
- Tress MacNeille as Daisy Duck
- Jim Cummings as Peg-Leg Pete
- April Winchell as Clarabelle Cow
- Jeff Bennett and Maurice LaMarche as the Beagle Boys
- Rob Paulsen as The Troubadour
- Jess Harnell as Major General
- Additional voices by Frank Welker

== Production ==
An adaptation of Alexandre Dumas's The Three Musketeers, with Mickey Mouse, Donald Duck, and Goofy as the Musketeers, was planned during the 1980s at Walt Disney Animation Studios. In 1983, storyboard artists Steve Hulett and Pete Young developed the project with Mickey Mouse, Donald Duck, Goofy, and José Carioca as the Musketeers, but it fell into development hell. In 2002, in honor of Mickey Mouse's 75th anniversary, a featurette entitled The Search of Mickey Mouse was announced. The project was about Mickey who gets kidnapped by unknown forces, forcing Minnie Mouse to enlist Basil of Baker Street to investigate his disappearance, and later encounters one character from Disney's animated film canon such as Alice, Peter Pan, Robin Hood, and Aladdin. The project suffered script problems with the multiple cameos being thought to be too gimmicky. After the cancellation of the latter project, a feature film based on The Three Musketeers with Mickey, Donald, and Goofy in the lead roles was greenlit instead, indicating that Hulett and Young's project had been revived but the film did not include José Carioca as in the early development.

== Reception ==
Mickey, Donald, Goofy: The Three Musketeers had a rating of 42% on review aggregator Rotten Tomatoes based on 12 reviews with an average score of 4.84/10.

== Release ==
The film had a limited theatrical screening in El Capitan Theatre. The film was first released on DVD and VHS on August 17, 2004. and followed by United Kingdom was released on September 13, 2004. At the time of release the three main characters appeared as costumed characters in Fantasyland at the Disney parks. The DVD was the first to include Disney's FastPlay, which imitates VHS operation by starting play automatically rather than waiting at the main menu for user input. For the film's 10th anniversary, it was released on Blu-ray on August 12, 2014.

== Video games ==
A world named the Country of the Musketeers based on the film appears in Kingdom Hearts 3D: Dream Drop Distance. This is the first time a world in the Kingdom Hearts series has originated from a direct-to-video feature. Like the Timeless River world in Kingdom Hearts II, it is featured as a period of Mickey Mouse's past. All the characters except Daisy, Clarabelle, and the Troubadour appear.

== Soundtrack ==
The soundtrack for the film, titled Mickey, Donald & Goofy: The Three Musketeers, was released on August 13, 2004, by Walt Disney Records. In addition to seven classical pieces reinterpreted with new comedic lyrics by Chris Otsuki, it also features a rewritten cover of the Schoolhouse Rock classic "Three Is a Magic Number" by Stevie Brock, Greg Raposo and Matt Ballinger. In 2018, Mickey, Donald and Goofy: The Three Musketeers became the first direct-to-video Disney film to have its full musical score, released on CD by Intrada Records. Like the original album, Intrada's release includes all the songs from the film, though in this release, most of them are put together with the respective pieces of Bruce Broughton's background music that leads up to them. Some of the music cues include pieces of the score that ultimately went unused in the film. The "Three is a Magic Number" cover is also omitted this time.

No.	Title	Performer(s)	Length
1.	"All for One and One for All ("Can-Can" from Orpheus in the Underworld, by Jacques Offenbach)"	Rob Paulsen & Chorus
2.	"Love So Lovely ("Dance of the Reed Flutes" from The Nutcracker and "Romeo and Juliet Fantasy Overture" from Romeo and Juliet, by Pyotr Ilyich Tchaikovsky)"	Rob Paulsen & Chorus
3.	"Petey's King of France ("In the Hall of the Mountain King" from Peer Gynt Suite No. 1, by Edvard Grieg)"	Jim Cummings
4.	"Sweet Wings of Love (The Blue Danube, by Johann Strauss, Jr.)"	Rob Paulsen & Chorus
5.	"Chains of Love (Habanera from Carmen, by Georges Bizet)"	Bill Farmer, April Winchell & Chorus
6.	"This Is the End (Symphony No. 5 in C Minor, by Ludwig van Beethoven)"	Rob Paulsen & Chorus
7.	"L'Opera (The Pirates of Penzance, by W. S. Gilbert and Arthur Sullivan)"	Jess Harnell & Chorus
8.	"Three Is a Magic Number"	Stevie Brock, Greg Raposo & Matt Ballinger
