= Disney's The Three Musketeers =

Disney's The Three Musketeers can refer to:

- The Three Musketeers, a 1993 action film
- Mickey, Donald, Goofy: The Three Musketeers, a 2004 animated film
