= Stevie Brock =

American pop singer

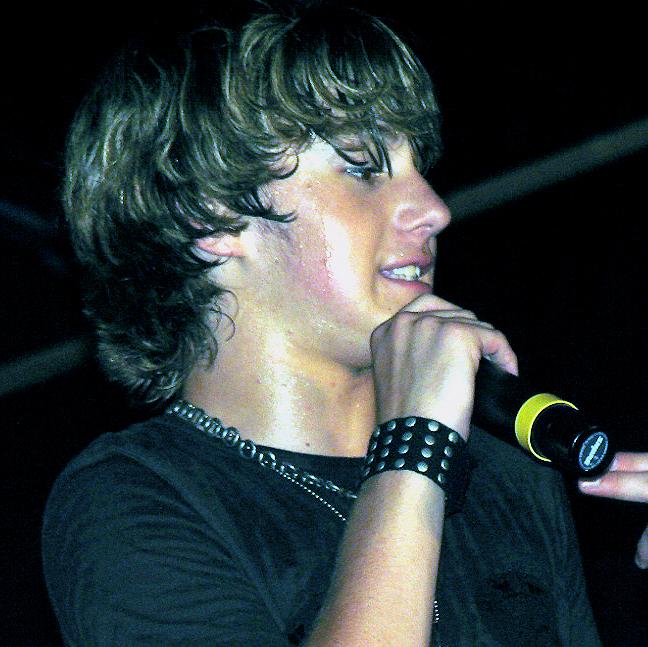
- Stevie Brock in concert in Baton Rouge, Louisiana on June 26, 2004

Background information
- Born: Stephen Ray Brock; October 23, 1990 (age 35)
- Origin: Dayton, Ohio, U.S.
- Genres: Pop, R&B
- Occupation: Singer
- Instrument: Vocals
- Years active: 2002–present
- Website: steviebrock.com

Stephen Ray Brock (born October 23, 1990) is an American pop singer. A native of Dayton, Ohio, he was signed to WIRE Records in 2002, releasing his eponymous debut album in 2003.

Since then, Brock has been featured on Radio Disney and its series of compilations.

== Singing career ==
In 2002, at eleven years old, he was discovered in his home town of Dayton and signed to WIRE Records (see album liner notes), the Orlando-based company owned by Johnny Wright. His first hit single was a cover of Color Me Badd's "All for Love". His self-titled debut album, released on June 10, 2003, includes the music video for the song. Brock was the guest vocalist on Triple Image's (also on WIRE Records) single "The Boy Next Door".

In 2003, Brock toured with Aaron Carter in "Aaron's Jukebox World Tour" and later toured with Radio Disney, appearing in the Jingle Jam Tour with Greg Raposo and Jesse McCartney, Jump5's 2004 Spring Thing Tour, among others. Later in 2004, he was featured on Radio Disney Jams, Vol. 6 ("All for Love"), DisneyMania 2 ("Zip-A-Dee-Doo-Dah"), and Radio Disney Jingle Jams ("Santa Claus Is Coming to Town"). Brock also teamed up with former Dream Street members Greg Raposo and Matt Ballinger to record "Three Is a Magic Number" for the soundtrack to Disney's animated feature Mickey, Donald, Goofy: The Three Musketeers.

Brock graduated in 2009 from Centerville High School in Centerville, a suburb of Dayton, Ohio. In the latter part of 2013, Brock joined three of his former high school classmates (Dan Cox, Bill Reilich, and Dan Burtenshaw) to form a singing group called The Cream Pies. On January 9, 2014, The Cream Pies recorded a humorous musical tribute to television talk show host Ellen DeGeneres and posted it to their YouTube channel. DeGeneres featured the video on January 15, 2014, and invited The Cream Pies to appear as guests on a future edition of The Ellen DeGeneres Show. They accepted her invitation and appeared on Ellen's January 22, 2014 broadcast.

In 2018, Stevie appeared on the Fox Broadcasting Company singing competition show The Four: Battle For Stardom, but was eliminated before being able to challenge one of the current "four".

== Discography ==
Album :

- 2003: Stevie Brock

Singles :

- All For Love (2003)
- If U Be My Baby (2003)
- You Don't Have To Say (2019)
- Sweet Tooth (2021)
- Chill (2022)
- All About You (2023)
- YDLHNM (2024)

== Soundtracks and collaborations ==
- Celebrate (Triple Image) (2002) - "The Boy Next Door"
- Radio Disney Jams, Vol. 6 (2003) – "All for Love"
- Disneymania 2 (2004) – "Zip-A-Dee-Doo-Dah"
- Radio Disney Jingle Jams (2004) – "Santa Claus Is Coming to Town"
- Mickey, Donald, Goofy: The Three Musketeers soundtrack (2004) – "Three Is a Magic Number" (with Greg Raposo and Matt Ballinger)
