= Shanelle Workman =

American actress, producer and director

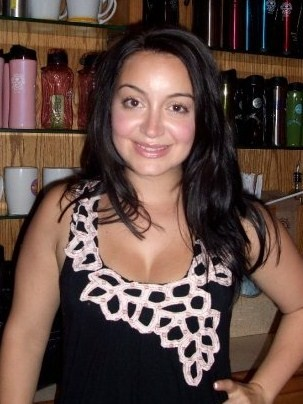
- Workman in November 2009
- Other names: Shanelle Workman-Gray; Shanelle Gray
- Occupations: Actress; producer; director
- Years active: 1991–present
- Spouse: David Barry Gray (m. 2007)
- Children: 2
- Relatives: Ariel Winter (sister); Jimmy Workman (brother)

Shanelle Workman is an American actress, producer and director. She is best known for playing the roles of Sarah "Flash" Roberts on the ABC soap opera One Life to Live and Gabriela 'Gaby' Moreno Forester on the CBS soap opera The Bold and the Beautiful. Additionally, Workman voiced Larxene in the video game series Kingdom Hearts and Wendy in commercials for the fast food chain Wendy's.

== Career ==
Workman starred in the 2005 film The Biggest Fan alongside Kaila Amariah and the late Chris Trousdale as Debbie Worden’s best friend, Charlotte.

Workman has also appeared with fellow soap actress Eden Riegel in the Broadway production of Les Misérables.

In 2005, Workman started filming Jump Shot, where she played a student of Ray Liotta. Workman returned to soaps as Gabriela "Gaby" Moreno Forrester on The Bold and the Beautiful in March 2005 but was let go by the producers of the soap in October 2005 due to storyline purposes and because the character never caught on with viewers.

Workman was the voice actress of Caren Velázquez from the video game Dino Crisis 3, Pasadena O'Possum in Crash Tag Team Racing, Jennifer Willis in Splatterhouse, as well as the leading role as the voice of Milliarde in the GameCube game Baten Kaitos Origins. She also played the role of Larxene in the Kingdom Hearts series, and Alestia Lallis in Mass Effect.

Workman owns Gray Studios LA with her husband, David Barry Gray.

== Personal life ==
On October 3, 2012, Workman became the temporary guardian of her younger sister Ariel Winter, following allegations of Winter's physical and emotional abuse at the hands of their mother Chrisoula. Workman filed a guardianship petition, seeking permanent guardianship over Winter. In her youth, Workman was removed from her mother's care after similar allegations.

In August 2013, Workman's younger brother Jimmy Workman petitioned a court that he be granted custody of Winter, stating that their other sister, Workman, was an "unfit guardian" and a poor role model for Winter. Jimmy, who spoke on behalf of his mother to dispute the accusations that had been leveled at her, lobbied the court for custody by stating that Workman allowed Winter to be publicly "sexualized", that she exploited Winter to promote her acting school, and that she used the money Winter earned as a cast member of the TV series Modern Family to finance "lavish parties and limousines," which Jimmy stated had torn their family apart. Jimmy also told the court that their father, Glenn Workman, who was in charge of Winter's estate, was unfit because his poor financial situation made him vulnerable to manipulation by Workman and her lawyers.

On May 5, 2014, the court ordered permanent guardianship to Workman and removed Winter from her mother's guardianship permanently. In May 2014, a settlement was reached among the parties by which Workman would retain custody of Winter, with Glenn maintaining control of her finances, and making required reports to the court. Superior Court judge Daniel Murphy would retain jurisdiction over Winter until she turned 18 in 2016, while Workman and Chrisoula later released a statement stating that they were working toward reconciliation.

== Filmography ==
=== Film ===
Year	Title	Role	Notes
1993	The Skateboard Kid	Jenny	
2002	The Biggest Fan	Charlotte	
2004	Daytime's Greatest Weddings	Sarah	Video documentary Stock footage
2006	Even Money	Jill	
2013	The Blackout	Layla	
2013	The House of Magic	Maggie	Voice role; credited as Shanelle Gray
2017	Float Like a Butterfly, Sting Like a Spelling Bee!	Judge	Short film Also director
2017	Kids After Dark	—N/a	Short film Also director

=== Television ===
Year	Title	Role	Notes
1991	Murphy Brown	Frank's Sister	Episode: "On Another Plane: Part 1"
1991	Howie and Rose	Rose Haber	TV pilot
1991	Coconut Downs	Jane	Television
1991	Eerie, Indiana	Sara Bob	Episode: "Who's Who"
1992	Step by Step	Jill	Episode: "The Boys in the Band"
1992	Tequila and Bonetti	Casey, Kate	2 episodes
1993	Phenom	Annette	2 episodes
2003–04	One Life to Live	Sarah "Flash" Roberts	Series regular
2003	18th Annual Soap Opera Digest Awards	Herself	TV special
2003	The 30th Annual Daytime Emmy Awards	Herself	TV special
2003–05	SoapTalk	Herself	Appearing in three episodes aired 7 May 2003, 2 September 2003 and 26 April 2005
2004	ER	Denise	Episode: "Just a Touch"
2005	The Bold and the Beautiful	Gabriela 'Gaby' Moreno Forester	Series regular; 56 episodes
2005	The 32nd Annual Daytime Emmy Awards	Herself	TV special
2007	Cory in the House	Vanessa	2 episodes
2007	Grey's Anatomy	Sara	Episode: "Crash Into Me"
2011	Rizzoli & Isles	Secretary	Episode: "Gone Daddy Gone"
2014	Entertainment Tonight	Herself	Representing Gray Studios in episodes aired 25 November 2014; 6 December 2014 (stock footage)

=== Video games ===
Year	Title	Voice role	Notes
2003	Dino Crisis 3	Caren	
2003	Chaos Legion	Arcia Rinslet	English version
2005	Rogue Galaxy	Miri Rhyza, Nina	English version
2005	Crash Tag Team Racing	Pasadena O'Possum	
2006	Baten Kaitos Origins	Milly	English version
2006	Thrillville	Teen Female 1	
2007	Mass Effect	Alestia Iallis, ERCS Guard	
2007	Thrillville: Off the Rails	Teen Females	
2008	Kingdom Hearts Re: Chain of Memories	Larxene	English version
2009	Kingdom Hearts 358/2 Days	Larxene	English version Archival footage
2010	Splatterhouse	Jennifer Willis	
2013	Kingdom Hearts HD 1.5 Remix	Larxene	English version Archival footage
2019	Kingdom Hearts III	Larxene	English version
2021	Mass Effect Legendary Edition	Alestia Iallis	
