= Dream Street (Dream Street album) =

Studio album by Dream Street
- Released: July 10, 2001
- Genre: Teen pop
- Length: 52:04
- Label: Edel
- Producers: Benny Cosgrove; Kevin Clark; Steve Diamond; Rex Rideout; Johan Åberg; Anders Hansson; Jörgen Elofsson

Dream Street chronology
Dream Street (2001)	The Biggest Fan (2002)

Singles from Dream Street
- 1. "It Happens Every Time" Released: June 2001; 2. "I Say Yeah" Released: October 2001; 3. "With All My Heart (Note: Also released as a single on the soundtrack of the 2005 film The Biggest Fan.)" Released: November 2002

Dream Street is the self-titled debut album by American boyband Dream Street. It was released on July 10, 2001, by Edel America Records.

== Track listing ==
Credits adapted from Apple Music metadata.

All songs produced by Berny Cosgrove and Kevin Clark, except where noted.

Dream Street track listing
No.	Title	Writer(s)	Lead vocals	Length
1.	"Feel the Rain"	Berny Cosgrove; Kevin Clark; Johnny Jam and Delgado	Chris Trousdale; Greg Raposo	4:00
2.	"They Don't Understand (Note: There is an alternate version of this song entitled "They Don't Understand (Pokemon Version)" which is used in Pokémon the Movie 2000.)" (produced by Steve Diamond and Rex Rideout)	Diamond; Robbie Nevil; Rideout; Cole Diamond	Trousdale; Frankie Galasso; Jesse McCartney; Matt Ballinger; Raposo	3:01
3.	"It Happens Every Time" (produced by Johan Aberg, Anders Hansson, and Jörgen Elofsson)	Elofsson	Raposo; Galasso; McCartney	3:12
4.	"Gotta Get the Girl"	Cosgrove; Clark; Narada Michael Walden	McCartney	3:57
5.	"Sugar Rush"	Fredrik Thomander; Anders Wikstrom	Raposo; Ballinger; Galasso; Trousdale; McCartney	3:36
6.	"Jennifer Goodbye"	Brian Lukow; Cosgrove; Clark	Raposo	4:07
7.	"I Say Yeah"	Thomander; Wikstrom	Galasso; Trousdale; Ballinger; McCartney; Raposo	2:57
8.	"Matter of Time"	Reeves Watson; Steve Migliore	Raposo; Ballinger; Trousdale; McCartney; Galasso	3:43
9.	"Let's Get Funky Tonight"	Cosgrove; Clark	McCartney; Ballinger	3:16
10.	"This Time"	Cosgrove; Clark	Ballinger; McCartney; Galasso	3:46
11.	"Hooked on You"	Watson; Scott Davidson	Ballinger	4:11
12.	"Someone to Hold Me Tonight"	Gicho; Soderquist	Trousdale	3:39
13.	"Dream On"	Cosgrove; Clark	Galasso	4:32
14.	"With All My Heart"	Babbie Mason		4:07
Total length:				52:04

== Charts ==
=== Weekly charts ===
Chart performance for Dream Street
Chart (2001)	Peak position
US Billboard 200	37

=== Year-end charts ===
Year-end chart performance for Dream Street
Chart (2001)	Position
US Billboard 200	196
