= Stevie Brock (album) =

Studio album by Stevie Brock
- Released: June 10, 2003
- Recorded: 2002–2003
- Genre: Teen pop
- Length: 28:45
- Label: Wire Records
- Producer: Gary Carolla; Lenny Mollings; Todd Nystrom; Johnny Wright (exec.)

Singles from Stevie Brock
- 1. "All for Love"

Stevie Brock is the only album by American singer Stevie Brock. It was released on June 10, 2003, through Wire Records.

== Critical reception ==
Stevie Brock received mainly negative reviews from critics. Johnny Loftus from AllMusic gave it one-and-a-half stars out of five, criticizing Brianna Lauren Fuentes's rap on "Shut Me Down" and saying Brock sounds like a little kid singing along to Justin Timberlake lyrics. However, he praised the songs "If U Be My Baby" and "All for Love," naming them the album's Track Picks.

Professional ratings
Review scores
Source	Rating
Allmusic	link

== Track listing ==
Stevie Brock
No.	Title	Writer(s)	Length
1.	"If U Be My Baby"	J.T. Bowen; Mark Calderon; Todd Nystrom	3:53
2.	"Shut Me Down" (featuring Brianna Lauren)	Gary Carolla	3:40
3.	"Never Wanna Give You Up"	Calderon; H. Thompson	3:23
4.	"I Found You"	Lenny Mollings	3:34
5.	"All for Love"	Calderon; Thompson	3:30
6.	"You're the Inspiration"	Peter Cetera; David Foster	3:41
7.	"Girl You Know It's True"	Sean Spencer	3:33
8.	"Flying"	Jack Livesey	3:31
Total length:			28:45
