= Marcus Toji =

American actor

- Born: Marcus Mamoru Toji; California, United States
- Education: Beverly Hills High School; UCLA
- Occupation: Actor
- Years active: 1991–present
- Known for: Movie Surfers
- Awards: Copper Wing Award in 2006 for his role in the film Self Medicated

Marcus Mamoru Toji is an American actor best known for his role on Movie Surfers and Little Giants.

== Early life and education ==
Marcus Mamoru Toji was born in California, United States.

He attended Beverly Hills High School, and then UCLA.

== Career ==
Toji has been performing as an actor since 1991. He played a small part as a child in Drexell's Class episode: "Silent Night, Holy Smokes".

He was in a Betty Crocker commercial for fruit snacks.

He won a Copper Wing Award in 2006 for his role in the film Self Medicated.

== Filmography ==
=== Television ===
Year	Title	Role	Notes
1991	Drexell's Class	Kid	Episode: "Silent Night, Holy Smokes"
1994	Thunder Alley	Mason Charter-Wells	Episode: "Give 'Em Hell, Bobbi"
1994	Partners	Kid Dressed as Chandler Bing	Episode: "Who Are You Supposed to Be?"
1995	Family Matters	Little Boy	Episode: "My Uncle the Hero"
1996–1997	Boy Meets World	Einstein Kid, Kid #1	2 episodes
1996–1998	Hey Arnold!	Park, Iggy, Third Grade Kid	Voice, 5 episodes
1997	Toothless	Trevor	Television film
1998	7th Heaven	Brother #2	Episode: "My Kinda Guy"
1999	Party of Five	Protz	Episode: "Witness for the Prosecution"
2000	Static Shock	Duncan, Henry	Voice, episode: "The New Kid"
2001–2004	Movie Surfers	Himself	
2003–2004	Fillmore!	Vern Natoma, JC	Voice, 3 episodes
2003	Right on Track	Randy Jones	Television film
2006	Weeds	Waiter	Episode: "Cooking with Jesus"
2007	It's Always Sunny in Philadelphia	Phil	Episode: "Dennis and Dee's Mom Is Dead"
2007–2008	Zoey 101	Calvin	4 episodes
2009	House	Dex	Episode: "Brave Heart"
2010	Party Down	Lane	Episode: "Precious Lights Pre-School Auction"
2010	Rules of Engagement	Maynard	Episode: "Free Free Time"
2012	Happy Endings	Clerk	Episode: "Four Weddings and a Funeral (Minus Three Weddings and One Funeral)"
2013	General Hospital	Clerk	Episode: "Episode #1.12745"
2013–2014	The Legend of Korra	Wing, Wei, Little Chou	Voice, 6 episodes
2014	The Goldbergs	Waiter	Episode: "I Rode a Hoverboard!"
2014	Rainbow Brite	Brian	Voice, 3 episodes
2015	Workaholics	Brian	Episode: "Trivial Pursuits"
2015–2017	Patriot	Stephen Tchoo	9 episodes
2017	We Bare Bears	Cory	Voice, episode: "$100"
2017–2019	Hanazuki: Full of Treasures	Maroshi	Voice, 8 episodes
2018	Maniac	Calvin	Episode: "Windmills"
2024	Moon Girl and Devil Dinosaur	Andy	Voice, episode: "Dancing With Myself"

=== Film ===
Year	Title	Role	Notes
1994	Little Giants	Marcus	
1994	Corrina, Corrina	Tommy Wang	
1996	Jingle All the Way	Little Boy with Car Remote	
1996	Dear God	Petting Zoo Kid	
2000	The Little Mermaid II: Return to the Sea	Merboy #2	Voice, direct-to-video
2001	Max Keeble's Big Move	Food Fight Chess Player	
2005	Self Medicated	Mike	
2021	Words Bubble Up Like Soda Pop	Japan	Voice, English dub
