= Bringing Up Jack =

1995 American television sitcom

- Genre: Sitcom
- Created by: Nat Bernstein; Mitchel Katlin
- Starring: Jack Gallagher; Harley Jane Kozak; Kathryn Zaremba; Jeff Garlin; Matthew Lawrence
- Country of origin: United States
- Original language: English
- No. of seasons: 1
- No. of episodes: 6 (1 unaired)

Production
- Camera setup: Multi-camera
- Running time: 30 minutes
- Production companies: Katlin/Bernstein Productions; Touchstone Television

Original release
- Network: ABC
- Release: May 27 – June 24, 1995

Bringing Up Jack is an American television sitcom that aired on ABC from May 27 to June 24, 1995.

== Premise ==
Jack Gallagher plays a sports radio host with a chaotic family life consisting of a pregnant wife and two stepkids.

== Cast ==
- Jack Gallagher as Jack McMahon
- Harley Jane Kozak as Ellen McMahon, Jack's wife
- Matthew Lawrence as Ryan McMahon, Ellen's son and Jack's stepson
- Kathryn Zaremba as Molly McMahon, Ellen's daughter and Jack's stepdaughter
- Jeff Garlin as Artie

== Episodes ==
No.	Title	Directed by	Written by	Original release date
1	"Pilot"	Robby Benson	Unknown	May 27, 1995
Jack takes his stepson to a hockey game, even though he's got homework.
2	"Close Personal Friends"	Pamela Fryman	Unknown	June 3, 1995
Ellen and Jack tries to make new friends together.
3	"Saturday in the Park with Jack"	Pamela Fryman	Daryl Rowland and Lisa DeBenedictis	June 10, 1995
The family plans a camping trip.
4	"The Beeper"	Pamela Fryman	David Sacks	June 17, 1995
Jack buys a pager when Ellen finds out that she may deliver her baby early. Bubba Smith guest stars as himself.
5	"Gimme an R-Y-A-N"	Pamela Fryman	Lee Aronsohn	June 24, 1995
Ellen's teenage son starts dating an older cheerleader.
6	"The Contest"	Pamela Fryman	TBD	UNAIRED
Jack is the host of a bikini contest in Atlantic City.
