= Pooh's Grand Adventure: The Search for Christopher Robin =

- Home video release poster
- Directed by: Karl Geurs
- Written by: Carter Crocker; Karl Geurs
- Based on: Characters created by A. A. Milne
- Produced by: Karl Geurs; Gina Shay
- Starring: Jim Cummings; John Fiedler; Ken Sansom; Paul Winchell; Peter Cullen; Brady Bluhm; Andre Stojka
- Narrated by: David Warner
- Music by: Carl Johnson
- Production company: Walt Disney Television Animation (Note: Animation outsourced to Walt Disney Animation Japan.)
- Distributed by: Buena Vista Home Video (Note: Distributed under the Walt Disney Home Video imprint.)
- Release dates: August 5, 1997 (United States); October 13, 1997 (United Kingdom)
- Running time: 76 minutes
- Country: United States
- Language: English

Pooh's Grand Adventure: The Search for Christopher Robin, known in the UK as Winnie the Pooh's Most Grand Adventure, is a 1997 American direct-to-video animated musical adventure comedy-drama film co-written, co-produced, and directed by Karl Geurs. The film follows Winnie the Pooh and his friends on a journey to find and rescue their friend Christopher Robin from the "Skull". Along the way, the group confront their own insecurities throughout the search, facing and conquering them in a series of events where they are forced to act beyond their own known limits, thus discovering their true potential. The film is loosely based on several of A. A. Milne's stories featured in The House at Pooh Corner, namely "In Which Rabbit Has a Busy Day, and We Learn What Christopher Robin Does in the Mornings" and "In Which Christopher Robin and Pooh Come to an Enchanted Place, and We Leave Them There".

== Plot ==
On the last day of summer in the Hundred Acre Wood, Christopher Robin spends time with his best friend Winnie the Pooh while unsuccessfully attempting to tell him some bad news. At the end of the day, Christopher Robin leaves Pooh with the advice, "You're braver than you believe, and stronger than you seem, and smarter than you think" and reassures the bear that even if there is a time when they are apart, they will always be together.

Autumn arrives the next day, when Pooh finds a honey pot with a note attached to it. Not knowing who the pot belongs to, Pooh decides to ask Christopher Robin about its owner, but he fails to find him. With his other friends, Piglet, Tigger, Rabbit, and Eeyore, Pooh visits the wise yet inept Owl, who reads the honey pot's note and erroneously concludes that Christopher Robin has gone to a distant cave called "Skull", where a creature called the "Skullasaurus" supposedly resides. Supplied with a map by Owl, Pooh, Piglet, Tigger, Rabbit, and Eeyore embark on a quest to save Christopher from Skull.

Throughout the group's journey, they repeatedly hear noises in the distance which they believe to be the roars of the Skullasaurus following them. Meanwhile, Piglet, Tigger, and Rabbit each face a particular problem that causes the three of them to lose their self-confidence: Piglet is abducted by a swarm of playful butterflies in a tranquil field; Tigger falls into a deep gorge and is unable to bounce out to safety, inadvertently causing the others to fall in with him; and Rabbit continuously makes bad leadership decisions following Owl's inaccurate map. Pooh tries to comfort them each with the advice Christopher Robin had given him but fails due to his inability to remember exactly what he said. Feeling defeated, the five take refuge in a cave for the night.

The group wake up the next morning to discover that they have actually spent the night in the Skull Cave. Exploring the cave, the friends split up to search the entire cave for Christopher Robin. Piglet, Tigger, Rabbit, and Eeyore eventually reunite, but Pooh ends up trapped in a narrow crevasse and his chants cause the others to believe that he has been devoured by the Skullasaurus. Continuing their mission without Pooh, the group find the "Eye of the Skull", where Christopher Robin is supposedly trapped. Overcoming their anxieties, Rabbit, Tigger, and Piglet come up with a plan to help everyone reach the Eye, which succeeds. Meanwhile, Pooh, witnessing his friends' cohesion, excitedly frees himself from the tight gap, only to slip down a long descent and fall into a steep pit that he is unable to escape. While there, Pooh remembers Christopher Robin's words and realizes that Christopher is still with him in his heart, even when they are not together.

Upon entering the Eye of the Skull, Tigger, Piglet, Rabbit, and Eeyore reunite with Christopher Robin, who had also been searching for them and reveals that the place he really went to was school, which is what he had tried to tell Pooh earlier, and that the "roars" they heard are just Pooh's stomach rumbling. The friends soon discover Pooh's survival and rescue him from the pit using a giant honey pot before they all return home. That evening, Christopher Robin informs Pooh that he will be going to school again tomorrow but the two promise to remain friends forever.

== Voice cast ==
- Jim Cummings as Winnie the Pooh / Tigger (singing voice)
- Paul Winchell as Tigger (speaking voice)
- John Fiedler as Piglet (speaking voice)
  - Steve Schatzberg as Piglet (singing voice)
- Peter Cullen as Eeyore
  - Dylan Watson as Eeyore (singing voice)
- Ken Sansom as Rabbit
  - Jess Harnell as Rabbit (singing voice)
- Brady Bluhm as Christopher Robin (speaking voice)
  - Frankie J. Galasso as Christopher Robin (singing voice)
- Andre Stojka as Owl
- David Warner as The Narrator

== Reception and legacy ==
Review aggregation website Rotten Tomatoes assessed an approval rating of 38% based on 8 reviews and an average score of 4.3/10.

George Blooston of Entertainment Weekly gave the film a C grade, calling it "treacly" and lacking the "grown up-wit [and] child psychology" from The Many Adventures of Winnie the Pooh. David Nusair of Reel Film Reviews called the film "tedious", and Alex Sandell of Juicy Cerebellum felt that Disney "always sucked with Pooh."

Jane Louise Boursaw of Kaboose praised the film's songwriting and animation. Gene Siskel and Roger Ebert gave the film "two thumbs up" on their review show as well.

In a 2023 interview, cartoonist and animation producer ND Stevenson (Nimona) said that the film was existential, stuck with him, and made him think about "things that I wasn't ready to think about yet, or I didn't even really know the ways in which it was going to help me process things and come to terms with things as an adult".

The song "Forever and Ever" was remixed by plunderphonics musician Pogo as "Boy & Bear" on his 2018 Ascend.

== Home media ==
The film was released on VHS in the United States on August 5, 1997. It was later issued on VHS in the United Kingdom on October 13, 1997. The 1997 VHS release has the Walt Disney Masterpiece Collection logo, despite being a direct-to-video film.

The film was released for the first time on "Special Edition" DVD on April 11, 2006, with digitally remastered picture and sound quality. The disc also includes a featurette called "Pooh's Symphony", and the 1968 film, Winnie the Pooh and the Blustery Day.

The film, alongside Piglet's Big Movie, was released on Blu-ray for the first time as a Disney Movie Club exclusive on July 17, 2018 to coincide with its belated 20th anniversary and the live-action Christopher Robin film, released over two weeks later. Notably, the artwork on the Blu-ray case contains no images from the film itself, and even features the characters of Kanga and Roo on the front cover, both of whom are entirely absent from the film.

== Video games ==
Certain elements of the plot, such as the skull and the misread map, were used in the 2001 video game Party Time with Winnie the Pooh and in the 2006 video game Kingdom Hearts II.

== Songs ==
All tracks are written by Michael Abbot and Sarah Weeks.

No.	Title	Performer(s)	Length
1.	"Forever and Ever"	Jim Cummings & Frankie J. Galasso
2.	"Adventure is a Wonderful Thing"	Andre Stojka
3.	"If It Says So"	Ken Sansom
4.	"Wherever You Are"	Jim Cummings	2:50
5.	"Everything is Right"	Cast
6.	"Wherever You Are (end credits)"	Barry Coffing & Vonda Shepard

== See also ==
- The Many Adventures of Winnie the Pooh
