= Frankie J. Galasso =

American actor and singer (born 1985)

- Born: Frank Jonathan Galasso; January 24, 1985 (age 41); New York City, U.S.
- Other names: Frankie Galasso; Frank Galasso
- Education: Salesian High School; Five Towns College
- Occupations: Actor, singer
- Years active: 1995—present
- Partner: Kara Tremel (2012–present)
- Musical career
- Genres: Pop, teen pop
- Instrument: Vocals
- Formerly of: Dream Street

Frankie J. Galasso (born January 24, 1985) is an American musician and actor. He is best known as a member of the boy band Dream Street. He provided the singing voice for Christopher Robin in several Winnie the Pooh films, including Pooh's Grand Adventure: The Search for Christopher Robin (1997).

== Early life ==
Galasso was born Frank Jonathan Galasso on January 24, 1985 in New York City to Lisa (née Cicero) and Francesco Galasso and attended Salesian High School in New Rochelle, New York, and Five Towns College in Dix Hills.

== Career ==
Galasso's career began in 1995 when he starred as Mickey Canetti in Hudson Street. In 1997, he played the role of Andrew Kempster in the movie Jungle 2 Jungle as well as being cast in the stage musical, Oliver! at North Shore Music Theatre in Beverly, Massachusetts. He provided the singing voice of Christopher Robin in Pooh's Grand Adventure: The Search for Christopher Robin (1997), A Winnie the Pooh Thanksgiving (1998), and Winnie the Pooh: A Valentine for You (1999).

Originally named 'Boy Wonder' (a name borrowed from the nickname of comic book character Robin from the Batman comics and films), Dream Street was put together by music producers Louis Baldonieri and Brian Lukow in 1999. Greg Raposo along with Chris Trousdale were already a shoo-ins for the Dream Street auditions since they were the original members of 'Boy Wonder'. After casting two-hundred boys, Galasso along with Jesse McCartney and Matt Ballinger joined the group.

Their eponymous debut album was released on July 10, 2001. It was certified Gold in the US by the RIAA peaking No. 1 on Billboard's Independent Albums chart and at No. 37 on the Billboard 200. The songs, "It Happens Every Time" and "I Say Yeah" were frequently played on Radio Disney. The boys soon made appearances to perform on various talk shows and television events including Maury and Ricki Lake.

While the rising success of Dream Street was growing, tensions between the music producers and the boys' parents also arise. This led to a lawsuit that would force the members to disband in 2002. The final Dream Street release was the soundtrack album to the 2002 film The Biggest Fan, which starred Trousdale. Galasso has appeared as himself in the film as well.

In 2003, Galasso portrayed Tommy in the movie A Tale of Two Pizzas.

In 2008, Galasso began recording new songs, releasing his single "Give Me a Reason" on March 19, 2009.

In 2012, Galasso was an ensemble cast member of the First National Touring of Jersey Boys. He portrayed 14 different characters during his run.

In January 2014, Galasso and Alissa Salvatore recorded a cover of "Say Something".

In September 2016, Galasso performed the National Anthem at Broncos Stadium before a Bengals vs. Broncos game and at Coors Field before a Rockies vs. Cardinals game.

On June 2, 2020, Galasso's former Dream Street bandmate Chris Trousdale died at a hospital in Burbank, California, at the age of 34 due to complications from an unknown illness during the COVID-19 pandemic in California. It was later revealed that COVID-19 was the main complication of Trousdale's death. On June 11, 2020, on what would be Trousdale's 35th birthday, Galasso and his former Dream Street bandmates Greg Raposo, Jesse McCartney, and Matt Ballinger reunited for a virtual performance of "It Happens Every Time" to pay tribute to Trousdale. This would be the first public appearance of Dream Street together as a group since the disbandment over the lawsuits prior.

In April 2023, Galasso and members Matt Ballinger & Greg Raposo were interviewed on the podcast, Frosted Tips with Lance Bass hosted by Lance Bass.

On May 12, 2023, Greg Raposo uploaded a short clip to Instagram of him, Matt Ballinger, & Galasso working on what appears to be new Dream Street music and material.

On June 11, 2023, Galasso and Dream Street members Greg Raposo & Matt Ballinger released the single entitled, "Smile" on what would have been former band member, Chris Trousdale's 38th birthday in honor of him following his death in 2020. (Note: Jesse McCartney left the group prior to the lawsuits in 2002 meaning he is no longer an official member and did not perform in "Smile")

The official music video for "Smile" was uploaded to Greg Raposo's YouTube channel the following day.

In October 2023, Galasso performed at a wedding in Massapequa, New York under Hank Lane Music.

It was revealed in June 2024 that Frankie had stepped back from Dream Street's revival, leaving Ballinger and Raposo as a duo.

== Personal life ==
Galasso has been in a relationship with Broadway actress Kara Tremel since September 10, 2012.

== Discography ==
Albums

- 2001: Dream Street
- 2002: The Biggest Fan

Singles

- 2001: It Happens Every Time
- 2001: I Say Yeah
- 2002: With All My Heart
- 2023: Smile

== Filmography ==
Film performances
Year	Title	Role
1997	Jungle 2 Jungle	Andrew Kempster
1997	Pooh's Grand Adventure: The Search for Christopher Robin	Christopher Robin (singing voice)
1998	A Winnie the Pooh Thanksgiving	Christopher Robin (singing voice)
1999	Winnie the Pooh: Seasons of Giving	Christopher Robin (singing voice)
2000	Sing a Song with Tigger	Christopher Robin (singing voice)
2000	Dream Street: It Happens Every Time	Frankie J. Galasso
2003	A Tale of Two Pizzas	Tommy
2005	The Biggest Fan (Note: The film was completed in 2002 and released in 2005)	Frankie J. Galasso

Television performances
Year	Title	Role
1995-1996	Hudson Street	Mickey Canetti
2000	All My Children	Himself
2001	Jerry Lewis MDA Labor Day Telethon	Himself
2001	Slime Time Live	Himself
