= The Broadway Kids =

Musical group

- Origin: New York City, U.S.
- Genres: Broadway; musicals; showtunes; pop
- Years active: 1994–2004
- Labels: Lightyear
- Website: facebook.com/TheBroadwayKidsalumni

The Broadway Kids was a concert group based in New York from 1994 to 2005. The group consisted of a rotating company of children, aged 8 to 14, who have performed in at least one Broadway, Off-Broadway or major national touring production. They performed concerts singing showtunes from various musicals, appearing at special events such as Broadway on Broadway, and have recorded three Broadway-centric CDs, one Christmas CD, one Americana CD, one movie-centric CD and one pop-centric CD. The group was founded by Julius Shulman and managed by Bonnie Gallanter. The Broadway Kids have also appeared in the Off-Broadway show The Broadway Kids Sing Broadway, which has been produced in various theatres in New York and elsewhere. After releasing "Hey, Mr. DJ!" in 2002, The Broadway Kids quit recording CDs. They continued to tour throughout 2004 and disbanded shortly after.

== Members ==
Notable past Broadway Kids have included:

- Lacey Chabert (Les Misérables, Family Guy, The Wild Thornberrys and Mean Girls)
- Ashley Tisdale (Les Misérables, Annie, The Suite Life of Zack & Cody, High School Musical (franchise) and Phineas and Ferb)
- Christy Carlson Romano (Even Stevens, Cadet Kelly, The Even Stevens Movie and Kim Possible)
- Chris Trousdale (Les Misérables, The Sound of Music and member of teen pop boy band Dream Street)
- Greg Raposo (Dream Street)
- Jesse Eisenberg (numerous, including Academy Award nomination for The Social Network)
- Andrea Bowen (Jane Eyre, Sugar Beats and The Sound of Music, Desperate Housewives)
- Cameron Bowen (Blue's Clues, Young Justice)
- Eden Riegel (Les Misérables, The Will Rogers Follies)
- Jenna Ushkowitz (Glee)
- Kathryn Zaremba (Annie Warbucks, Full House, and Toothless)
- Brandon Uranowitz (Tony Award winner, An American in Paris, Falsettos)
- Crysta Macalush Winton (Note: She was credited as "Crysta Macalush" until she was married to Jaime Winton.) (The Who's Tommy and Les Miserables)
- Erin Rakow (Les Miserables, The Diary of Anne Frank, and Sugar Beats)

== Discography ==
- The Broadway Kids Sing Broadway (1994, Lightyear)
- The Broadway Kids At the Movies (1997, Lightyear)
- The Broadway Kids Sing Christmas (1997, Lightyear)
- The Broadway Kids: Back on Broadway (1998, Lightyear)
- The Broadway Kids Sing America (2000, Lightyear)
- The Broadway Kids: The Best of Broadway (2001, Lightyear)
- The Broadway Kids: Hey, Mr. DJ! (2002, Lightyear)
