= Jimmy Workman =

American retired child actor (born 1980)

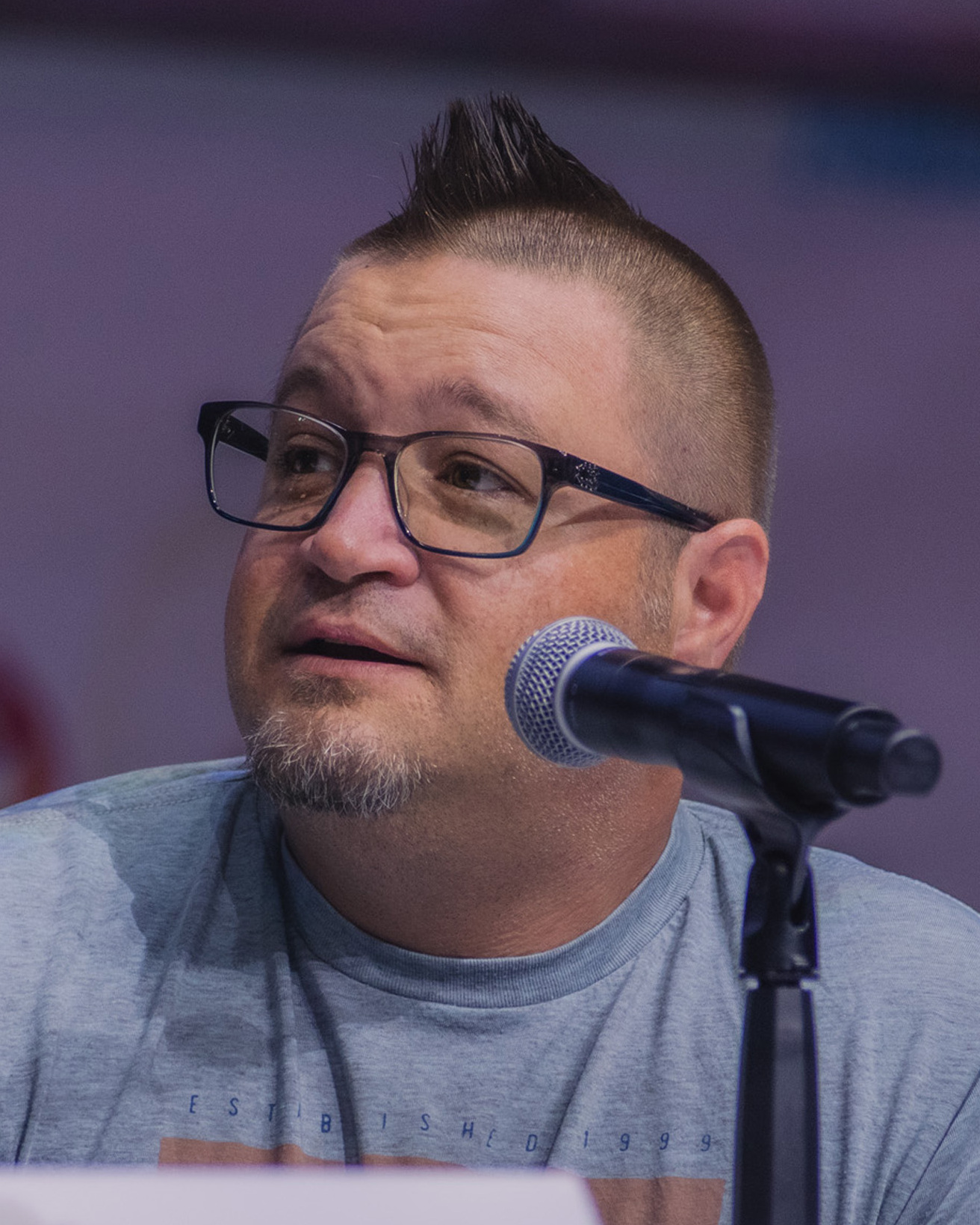
- Workman in 2024
- Born: James Christopher Workman; October 4, 1980 (age 46); Fairfax, Virginia, U.S.
- Occupation: Actor
- Years active: 1990–2002
- Notable work: The Addams Family; Addams Family Values
- Relatives: Shanelle Workman (sister); Ariel Winter (sister)

James Christopher Workman (born October 4, 1980) is an American retired child actor. He is best known for playing Pugsley Addams in The Addams Family (1991) and Addams Family Values (1993). He is the older brother of actress Ariel Winter.

== Early life ==
Workman was born October 4, 1980, in Fairfax, Virginia, the son of Chrisoula "Crystal", a homemaker, and Glenn Workman, who runs a communications firm. His older sister is actress Shanelle Workman, and their younger sister is actress Ariel Winter.

== Career ==
Jimmy Workman made his acting debut in 1991 as Pugsley Addams in the feature film The Addams Family. The eight-year-old Workman had accompanied his older sister Shanelle to her audition for the part of Wednesday Addams, which eventually went to actress Christina Ricci. Workman was playing on the set, and was noticed by director Barry Sonnenfeld and producer Scott Rudin, who asked him to read for the part of Pugsley, and cast him on that basis. Workman reprised the role in Addams Family Values in 1993.

Other small roles followed, in films such as Black Sheep, As Good as It Gets, and The Biggest Fan. His television work includes the series Matlock, Life with Louie, and the television film Christmas in Connecticut.

Workman eventually retired from acting, and began a career working behind the camera on the technical staff of film and television production. He is a member of Teamsters Local 399, one of the trade unions that represent people who work in the film industry.

== Personal life ==
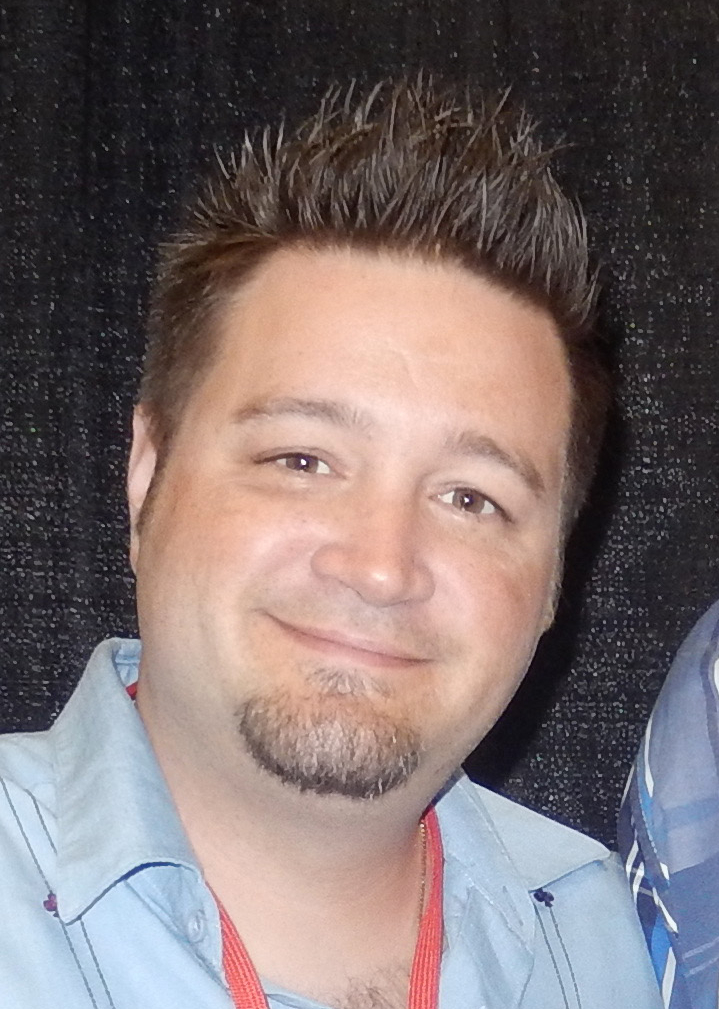
Workman in 2019

As of 2019, Workman lived in California with his family.

=== Family legal dispute ===
In August 2013, Workman petitioned a court that he be granted custody of his then-15-year-old sister, actress Ariel Winter, stating that their other sister, Shanelle Gray, was an "unfit guardian" and a poor role model for Winter. Gray had been granted temporary guardianship of Winter in November 2012, following the accusation that their mother, Chrisoula Workman, had been physically and emotionally abusive toward Winter. Workman, who spoke on behalf of their mother to dispute the accusations that had been leveled at her, lobbied the court for custody by stating that Gray allowed Winter to be publicly "sexualized", exploited Winter to promote her acting school, and used the money Winter earned as a cast member of the TV series Modern Family to finance "lavish parties and limousines," which Workman stated had torn their family apart. Workman also told the court that their father, Glenn Workman, who was in charge of Winter's estate, was unfit because his poor financial situation made him vulnerable to manipulation by Gray and her lawyers.

In May 2014, a settlement was reached among the parties by which Gray would retain custody of Winter, with Glenn Workman maintaining control of her finances, and making required reports to the court. Superior Court Judge Daniel Murphy would retain jurisdiction over Winter until she turned 18 (January 28, 2016), while Gray and Chrisoula Workman later released a statement stating that they were working toward reconciliation.

== Filmography ==
Film
Year	Title	Role	Notes
1991	The Addams Family	Pugsley Addams	
1993	Addams Family Values	Pugsley Addams	
1996	Black Sheep	Druggy Teen	Uncredited role
1997	As Good as It Gets	Sean	
2002	The Biggest Fan	Matt Parker	
2004	To Kill a Mockumentary	Himself	Direct-to-video

Television
Year	Title	Role	Notes
1991	The Horror Hall of Fame II	Himself - Presenter	Documentary
1992	Christmas in Connecticut	Kevin/Anthony	Television film
1992	Matlock	Bully #1	Episode: "Mr. Awesome"
1993	Late Night with Conan O'Brien	Himself	Episode aired November 10, 1993
1991–1993	Saturday Night Live	Pugsley Addams/Max	2 episodes
1996	Life with Louie		Episode: "Caddy on a Hot Tin Roof"

Crew
Year	Title	Notes
1998	Star Trek: Insurrection	Production assistant
