= Sarah Roberts (One Life to Live) =

- One Life to Live character
- Justis Bolding as Sarah Roberts
- Portrayed by: Hayden Panettiere (1994–1997); Shanelle Workman (2003–2004); Justis Bolding (2007–2009); (and child actors)
- Duration: 1991–1997; 2003–2004; 2007–2009
- First appearance: February 6, 1991
- Last appearance: January 7, 2009
- Created by: Craig Carlson
- Introduced by: Paul Rauch (1991); Linda Gottlieb (1994); Frank Valentini (2003, 2007)
- Shanelle Workman as Sarah "Flash" Roberts

- Hayden Panettiere as Sarah Roberts
In-universe information
- Occupation: Tour manager for the band "Puddle of Mudd"; Former Booker at Capricorn/Ultra Violet; Buchanan Enterprises board member Former Singer
- Family: Lord; Buchanan
- Father: Cord Roberts
- Mother: Tina Lord
- Brothers: C. J. Roberts
- Grandparents: Victor Lord; Irene Manning; Clint Buchanan; Maria Roberts
- Aunts and uncles: Victoria Lord; Meredith Lord; Tony Lord; Todd Manning; Victor Lord, Jr.; Kevin Buchanan (adoptive); Joey Buchanan (adoptive); Rex Balsom; Jessica Buchanan; Natalie Buchanan
- First cousins: Megan Gordon; Brian Kendall; Daniel Wolek; Kevin Buchanan; Joey Buchanan; Jessica Buchanan; Natalie Buchanan; Starr Manning; Danielle Manning; Jack Manning; Sam Manning; Shane Balsom Liam McBain Bree Brennan Ryder Ford

Sarah Roberts is a fictional character from the American serial drama One Life to Live and is the daughter of Tina Lord and Cord Roberts.

== Casting ==
Child actors Alexa and Zoe Fisher portrayed the role in 1991, followed by Courtney Chase from February 8, 1993, to 1994. Sarah was played by Hayden Panettiere from February 1, 1994, to January 13, 1997, and Shanelle Workman from February 4, 2003, to January 28, 2004. Justis Bolding portrayed the role from June 14, 2007, to January 7, 2009.

== Storylines ==
=== 1991–97 ===
In 1990, Tina is seeing Johnny Dee Hesser, son of mobster Carlo Hesser, and also sleeps with her ex-husband Cord. She soon discovers she is pregnant, but is not sure who the child's father is. Though believing the baby to be Johnny's, Cord is willing to reunite with Tina to raise the child as his own. Finding out about the baby, a distraught Johnny bursts into Llanfair, knocks Tina unconscious, and attempts to kidnap her. Tina's sister, Victoria Lord, had suffered a stroke, leaving her unable to walk or speak. Viki struggled with and overcome dissociative identity disorder in the past; realizing that Tina's life is in danger, Viki's alternate personality, Niki Smith, emerges. As Niki, Viki is able to stand, and then shoots Johnny to death. Initially, both Viki and Tina have no memory of what happened, and Tina becomes the prime suspect in the murder. However, an audio tape recorded in the room later exonerates her and proves that Viki had acted in self-defense.

Carlo wants to take his grandchild from Tina, who flees to Texas. Armed with medical proof that the baby is his, Cord follows. Tina goes into labor in a snowstorm, and with the help of Cord, gives birth in February 1991. She and Cord name their daughter Sarah Victoria, after Sarah Gordon Buchanan and Viki. Cord and Tina return to Llanview and remarry.

Cord is later presumed dead in 1992, and both Sarah and her older brother Clinton James "C.J." Roberts become attached to their mother's new boyfriend, Cain Rogan. Cord returns in 1993 suffering from post traumatic stress syndrome, but after much intrigue, Tina marries Cain in 1994 and leaves town with him. She returns without him soon after, and rededicates herself to raising her children.

David Vickers comes to town, claiming to be Tina's secret brother. Tina soon joins forces with David to swindle the massive inheritance from her and Viki's real brother: Todd Manning. Ultimately, Tina moves to Baltimore with C.J. and Sarah in 1996, returning briefly in 1997 to say good-bye to Cord when he leaves for London.

=== 2003–04 ===
Sarah returns to Llanview in 2003, calling herself “Flash” and singing in a band with Riley Colson, with whom she is also romantically involved. Sarah is looking for her brother, C.J., with whom she has lost touch. Sarah had also lost track of Tina, explaining that Tina's parenting had forced both her and her brother to run away.

Sarah is terrorized and nearly murdered by the Music Box Killer in 2004. He strangles her, but she survives and her voice is saved. Cord returns to bring her back to London for further recovery, and she breaks up with Riley.

=== 2007–09 ===
Sarah reappears in Chicago in June 2007, discovering that her boyfriend Hunter Atwood has been holding Todd Manning hostage. She secretly calls Todd's ex-wife, Blair Cramer, to inform her of Todd's whereabouts and asks that Blair not involve the police. Blair comes to Chicago with Cristian Vega and Rex Balsom, but Hunter has taken Todd elsewhere. Cristian and Rex insist that she return with them to Llanview; not eager to reunite with her family, she refuses. Sarah finally agrees only if she can stay with Rex or Cristian, claiming that she has been staying "off the Buchanan grid" and living off money from her parents. Hunter turns up in Llanview, Todd is ultimately found, and Hunter is killed. Sarah goes to talk to her great-grandfather, Asa Buchanan, but finds out he had died the night before. Cord comes to town for the funeral, and he and Sarah have a brief reunion before he returns to London. Sarah takes a job as a waitress at Capricorn, but soon pressures Cristian for more responsibilities as a talent booker. Sarah and Cristian then become romantically involved.

Tina reappears in town in June 2008 as the Crown Princess of Mendorra, and finds herself on the run from the U.S. Ambassador to Mendorra, Jonas Chamberlain, who wants the Mendorran Crown Jewels that she has stolen. Tina finds refuge with Sarah and Cristian, but Cristian and his brother, Antonio, discover that Jonas has abducted Sarah and her roommate Talia Sahid. Tina, Cristian, and Antonio agree to accompany Jonas back to Mendorra in order to exchange the women for the jewels. In Mendorra, the real mastermind behind the kidnappings is revealed to be Carlo Hesser. Carlo, bent on revenge for Tina's part in his son's death years before, drags Tina, Sarah, and Cristian to the river above the Hohenstein Falls. Tina is horrified as Carlo reveals his intent to send Sarah over the falls to her death, deliberately echoing Tina's own plunge over the Iguazu Falls in 1987. Cristian swims to Sarah's raft, and Tina watches as Sarah and Cristian go over the falls. Cristian and Sarah survive, and join the others in their escape.

Cristian is kidnapped by Carlo from the airport during the journey home, and is placed in a Colombian prison under the name "Ray Montez". Ray's estranged wife, Vanessa, visits to finalize their divorce and helps Cristian get out in exchange for his help in protecting Vanessa and her stepdaughter, Lola, from Ray, who had apparently escaped. Cristian brings Vanessa and Lola to Llanview. Vanessa's presence complicates Sarah and Cristian's relationship, which is strained further when Vanessa is threatened with deportation. Despite Sarah's protestations, Cristian marries Vanessa to keep her in the country after her life is threatened. Believing that Vanessa is manipulating the situation, Sarah tells the INS that the marriage is a fraud. In January 2009, Sarah confronts Cristian, berates him for abandoning their relationship, and tells him that she has accepted a job as the tour manager for the band, Puddle of Mudd. She leaves town.
