= Hudson Street (TV series) =

- Tony Danza & Lori Loughlin in 1996
- Genre: Sitcom
- Created by: Randi Mayem Singer
- Starring: Tony Danza; Lori Loughlin; Frankie J. Galasso
- Composer: Jonathan Wolff
- Country of origin: United States
- Original language: English
- No. of seasons: 1
- No. of episodes: 22

Production
- Executive producers: Susan Beavers; Nat Bernstein; Tony Danza; Mitchel Katlin; Randi Mayem Singer
- Producers: Tom Brady; Sam Kass; Tracey Ormandy
- Running time: 30 minutes
- Production companies: Katie Face Productions; TriStar Television

Original release
- Network: ABC
- Release: September 19, 1995 – June 19, 1996

Hudson Street is an American sitcom produced by Katie Face Productions and TriStar Television that aired on ABC for one season, from September 19, 1995 to June 19, 1996. The series starred and was executive produced by Tony Danza with Lori Loughlin also starring. The series also marked Tony Danza's return to ABC as a series regular for the first time since Who's the Boss? ended in 1992.

== Synopsis ==
Danza starred as Tony Canetti, a divorced detective in Hoboken, New Jersey, who shares custody of his son Mickey with his ex-wife. In between work and raising his son, Tony also starts a romance with an idealistic crime reporter, Melanie (Lori Loughlin).

The series received good reviews and initially placed in the top ten (partly due to its placement between the ABC hits Roseanne and Home Improvement), but the series was cancelled after one season as it could not hold on to its lead-in audience. ABC moved the series to Saturday nights in 1996 which sealed its fate for cancellation.

== Cast ==
- Tony Danza as Tony Canetti
- Lori Loughlin as Melanie Clifford
- Frankie J. Galasso as Mickey Canetti
- Jerry Adler as Al Teischler
- Christine Dunford as Det. Kirby McIntire
- Tom Gallop as Off. R. Regelski
- Jeffrey Anderson-Gunter as Winston Silvera
- Shareen J. Mitchell as Lucy Canetti

== Episode list ==
No.	Title	Directed by	Written by	Original release date	Viewers (millions)
1	"Pilot"	James Burrows	Randi Mayem Singer	September 19, 1995	23.4
2	"A Kiss is Just a Kiss"	Lee Shallat Chemel	Randi Mayem Singer	September 26, 1995	20.4
3	"Here's Just Looking at You, Kid"	Lee Shallat-Chemel	Dan Cohen & F.J. Pratt	October 3, 1995	21.7
4	"Crime, Per Se"	Lee Shallat-Chemel	Susan Beavers	October 17, 1995	18.0
5	"The Man's Man"	Lee Shallat-Chemel	Tom Brady	October 24, 1995	18.0
6	"The Hit Parade"	Lee Shallat-Chemel	Tracy Gamble & Richard Vaczy	October 31, 1995	15.5
7	"Guess Who's Coming to Dinner?"	Lee Shallat-Chemel	Randi Mayem Singer	November 7, 1995	16.6
8	"Contempt"	Lee Shallat-Chemel	Eric Brand & Robert Kurtz	November 14, 1995	18.2
9	"Road Warriors"	Lee Shallat-Chemel	Dan Cohen & F.J. Pratt	November 21, 1995	16.8
10	"Bells & Whistles"	John Rich	Craig Van Sickle & Steven Long Mitchell	November 28, 1995	14.3
11	"Mickey the Hood"	Lee Shallat-Chemel	Story by : Tom Brady, Eric Brand & Robert Kurtz; Teleplay by : Tom Brady	December 12, 1995	14.0
12	"Saturday Night's the Loneliest Night of the Week"	John Rich	Eric Brand & Robert Kurtz	December 19, 1995	16.2
13	"In the Line of Duty"	Lee Shallat-Chemel	Tom Brady	January 2, 1996	17.1
14	"I Loved Lucy"	Lee Shallat-Chemel	Tracy Gamble & Richard Vaczy	January 16, 1996	13.2
15	"Dear Cyberspace"	Lee Shallat-Chemel	Susan Beavers	January 23, 1996	16.5
16	"To Bob or Not to Bob"	Lee Shallat-Chemel	Tracy Gamble & Richard Vaczy	February 3, 1996	8.9
17	"Sunday in the Station with Mickey"	Gordon Hunt	Eric Brand & Robert Kurtz	February 10, 1996	6.8
18	"Tony's 15 Minutes"	Gordon Hunt	Eric Brand & Robert Kurtz	February 17, 1996	7.7
19	"Having My Baby"	James Hampton	Tracy Gamble & Richard Vaczy	May 29, 1996	10.3
20	"The Retreat"	Gail Mancuso	Lester Lewis	June 5, 1996	8.8
21	"One for the Monet"	Ken Lamkin	Tom Brady	June 12, 1996	9.5
22	"Family Album"	Gail Mancuso	Eric Brand & Robert Kurtz	June 19, 1996	9.5

== Awards and nominations ==
Year	Award	Category	Recipient	Result
1996	Young Artist Award	Best Performance by a Young Actor – TV Comedy Series	Frankie J. Galasso	Nominated
