= A Winnie the Pooh Thanksgiving =

1998 film directed by Jun Falkenstein

- Screenshot of the dinner scene
- Written by: Carter Crocker
- Directed by: Jun Falkenstein
- Voices of: Jim Cummings; John Fiedler; Paul Winchell
- Music by: Carl Johnson
- Country of origin: United States

Production
- Running time: 22 minutes
- Production companies: Walt Disney Television Animation; Walt Disney Television

Original release
- Network: ABC
- Release: November 26, 1998

A Winnie the Pooh Thanksgiving is a 1998 American made-for-television special featuring the voice talents of Jim Cummings, Paul Winchell, and John Fiedler. The special aired on ABC on November 26, 1998. The special shows Pooh and his friends learning the true meaning of Thanksgiving. It was nominated for Primetime Emmy for Outstanding Children's Program.

== Plot ==
When Thanksgiving finally arrives, Winnie the Pooh and his friends bring food for the big dinner: honey, acorns, lemonade, biscuits, thistles and ice cream. However, Rabbit informs them that the items they brought are not traditional to Thanksgiving. He insists that a special traditional time of year should include special traditional items: turkey, cranberry sauce, special dishes and pumpkin pie. Rabbit assigns Owl to wash the dishes, Gopher to make the pumpkin pie, Tigger and Eeyore to pick the cranberries, and most importantly, Pooh and Piglet to get the turkey (which Piglet believes to be a monstrous bird). Tigger and Eeyore gather the cranberries, but fail to notice that there is a hole in the sack they used to gather the cranberries. Meanwhile, Gopher blows up some pumpkins to make the pumpkin pie, creating a big mess in Rabbit's house. When Tigger and Eeyore head back to gather more cranberries, they end falling in the turkey trap Pooh and Piglet had set up. Thinking they have captured a real turkey, Pooh and Piglet bring the sack containing Tigger and Eeyore back to Rabbit. Tigger and Eeyore manage to break out of the sack, shocking everyone. In his excitement, Tigger flings the pumpkin pie in the air. Chaos breaks out as Rabbit manages to catch the pie, only to get his face planted into the pie by Tigger after knocking him off the fallen table. Owl loses control of the pile of plates he washed and thanksgiving decorations are destroyed. Demoralized, Rabbit calls off the feast and sadly heads back home. Everyone else disappointedly follows soon. While sadly and contemplatively eating his honey, Pooh realizes that if they all shared the food they originally brought, everyone can have a great Thanksgiving. Inspired and reinvigorated by this insight, Pooh rallies everyone and they surprise Rabbit with the Thanksgiving dinner they have set up. Dazed and confused at first, Rabbit is warmed by the gesture. They are all joined by Christopher Robin, who proposes a toast (with lemonade) to the best Thanksgiving celebration ever. Everyone sings about what Thanksgiving is really about: friends and thankfulness

== Cast ==
- Jim Cummings as Winnie the Pooh / Tigger's singing voice
- John Fiedler as Piglet
  - Steve Schatzberg as Piglet's singing voice
- Paul Winchell as Tigger
- Peter Cullen as Eeyore
- Ken Sansom as Rabbit
- Andre Stojka as Owl
- Michael Gough as Gopher
- Brady Bluhm as Christopher Robin
  - Frankie J. Galasso as Christopher Robin's singing voice
- David Warner as The Narrator

== Soundtrack ==
- "Hooray, Hooray!" - Pooh
- "The Turkey Song" - Pooh and Piglet
- "Berrily We Roll Along" - Tigger
- "Our Thanksgiving Day" - Pooh, Tigger, Piglet, Gopher, Christopher Robin, Rabbit, and Owl

== Broadcast ==
The special was originally aired Thanksgiving Day 1998 at 8 pm on ABC. According to TVTango.com's ratings database, the initial airing brought in a 3.8 household Nielsen rating.

== Home video ==
The special has not been released on home video by itself, with the exception of exclusive VHS tapes that were given to members of the Academy of Television Arts & Sciences for that year's show. It was released to the general public as part of the VHS cassette Winnie the Pooh: Seasons of Giving with the narrator's lines were redubbed by Laurie Main, and the ending scene was shortened down, along with select episodes of The New Adventures of Winnie the Pooh in 1999.
