= The Biggest Fan =

Direct-to-DVD film issued 2005

- Directed by: Michael Criscione; Michael Meyer
- Cinematography: Wes Llewellyn
- Release date: May 18, 2005; (Note: The film was completed in 2002 and released in 2005)
- Language: English

The Biggest Fan is a film featuring the band Dream Street (Chris Trousdale, Jesse McCartney, Matt Ballinger, Frankie J. Galasso, and Greg Raposo). The main characters are Chris Trousdale (playing himself) and his "Biggest Fan" Debbie Worden (Kaila Amariah). It was made in 2002 just before the band split because of the problems between their parents and producers; however, the film's release was postponed pending the outcome of a lawsuit between some of the band members and the band's management. Chris Trousdale is prominently featured in the film, while the other Dream Street members have cameo roles in the beginning and the end of the film. Trousdale promoted the film at his concerts after filming was complete. The Biggest Fan was released on DVD on May 18, 2005 (USA/Canada) and in 2007 (Australia). The soundtrack was released by Edel.

== Plot ==
Debbie's favorite band is Dream Street, and her favorite member is Chris Trousdale. When Chris gets a fever while travelling on the Dream Street tour, in a haze, he strays away and ends up in Debbie's bed, much to the shock of his "Biggest Fan", who thinks she's in heaven. Debbie proposes that Chris stay with her and he agrees. So, over the week they spend time together and she secretly hides him so he can escape the pressures of being a pop star for a little while. Chris even attends high school with Debbie, while disguised as a nerd. Meanwhile, the band's managers are going crazy at the loss of the star, thinking he has been kidnapped. At the end of the week Debbie and Chris (in disguise) go to her high school prom where two jealous popular girls figure out Chris's true identity and tell the police about Chris's whereabouts, splitting him and Debbie up. They are eventually reunited on stage at a concert, ending in a sweet, final kiss and a performance by Dream Street.

== Cast ==
Actors who appeared in the movie include:

- Dream Street as themselves:
  - Chris Trousdale (lead role)
  - Jesse McCartney (cameo)
  - Greg Raposo (cameo)
  - Frankie J. Galasso (cameo)
  - Matt Ballinger (cameo)
- Kaila Amariah as Debbie Warden
- Adam Wylie as Garfield Warden
- Cindy Williams as Debbie's mom
- Richard Moll as Harold Warden
- Shanelle Workman as Charlotte
- Pat Morita as Mr. Limp
- Claudia Swan as Claudia
- Leslie Easterbrook as Police Woman
- Michael Winslow as Officer Man
- Morgan Brittany as Charlotte's Mom
- Erin Cahill as Montana Wastedberg
- Courtnee Draper as Brittany Holland
- James Hong as Larson
- Jimmy Workman as Matt Parker

== Soundtrack ==
The soundtrack album was released by Sony Music Entertainment through Columbia Records on November 26, 2002. Songs from this release and their eponymous album appear in the film. 3 out of the 11 tracks are from RubyBlue, Dream Street's labelmates from Edel Entertainment.

All songs are performed by Dream Street unless stated and noted.

The Biggest Fan (Original Soundtrack)
No.	Title	Writer(s)	Producer(s)	Length
1.	"It Happens Every Time (Dance Remix)"	Jörgen Elofsson	Elofsson; Anders Hansson; Johan Aberg; Mike Rizzo^{[a]}	3:17
2.	"I'm Gonna Make You Love Me [Performed by Play (featuring Chris Trousdale)"	Jerry Ross; Jerry Williams, Jr.; Kenneth Gamble	Berny Cosgrove; Kevin Clark; HitVision	3:09
3.	"I Miss You"	Berny Cosgrove; Kevin Clark	Cosgrove; Clark	4:26
4.	"Run Away [Performed by Ruby Blue]"	Jeff Coplan; Christian Berman; Frank Berman	Coplan; C. Berman; F. Berman	3:25
5.	"You're Taking Me Over"	Cosgrove; Clark; Jodie Wilson	Cosgrove; Clark	4:21
6.	"With All My Heart"	Cosgrove; Clark; Doug Shawe	Cosgrove; Clark	4:07
7.	"I Say Yeah (New Version)"	Thomander; Wikström	Cosgrove; Clark	2:59
8.	"Fallen for You [Performed by Ruby Blue]"	Coplan; Alexis Krauss	Coplan; C. Berman; F. Berman	3:33
9.	"That's What Girls Do [Performed by Ruby Blue]"	Nina Osoff; Richard Supa	Coplan; C. Berman; F. Berman	3:13
10.	"This Time (Acoustic Version)"	Cosgrove; Clark	Cosgrove; Clark	3:42
11.	"Jennifer Goodbye (New Version)"	Cosgrove; Clark; Brian Lukow	Cosgrove; Clark	4:10

Notes

- ^{^a} signifies a remixer
- "I Miss You" is sometimes labelled as a 'New Version' since it consist of new vocal even though this is the first time it is released.
- RubyBlue is erroneously credited as "Ruby Blue"
