= Kathryn Zaremba =

American writer, singer and actor

- Born: Kathryn Lauren Zaremba; September 24, 1983 (age 42); Broken Arrow, Oklahoma, U.S.
- Education: Kansas City Art Institute; Corcoran College of Art and Design
- Occupations: Actress, singer, artist, writer, illustrator, surface designer, businesswoman
- Years active: 1992–1997
- Spouse: Jeremy Ney (m. 2010)
- Website: katezaremba.com

Kathryn Lauren Zaremba (born September 24, 1983) is an American writer, illustrator, surface designer, business woman, singer, and former actress. She is best known for her roles as Annie Bennett Warbucks in the 1993 musical Annie Warbucks and Lisa Leeper on Full House. Zaremba also co-starred on Bringing up Jack and The Jeff Foxworthy Show, as well as making several appearances on Sisters. Her last professional screen acting credit was the 1997 Disney television film Toothless, starring Kirstie Alley. She retired from acting when she was 13. During her time on Full House she was a member of The Broadway Kids. Kathryn has an older sister named Elisabeth. She was eventually cast as Annie Bennett Warbucks in the Broadway production of Annie Warbucks. Annie Warbucks is the sequel to Annie. Annie Warbucks received mixed reviews. The show never made it to Broadway and became an Off Broadway production. Annie Warbucks premiered at The Civic Theater in San Diego, California.

Zaremba is a 2002 graduate of Broken Arrow Senior High School. She is an alumna of Kansas City Art Institute and Corcoran College of Art and Design. Zaremba works as an illustrator and surface designer. She married Jeremy Ney in 2010 and they live in Washington, D.C., where she runs her business, Kate Zaremba Company. She also co runs The Lemon Bowl.

== Television and theatre credits ==
Title	Role	Year
Toothless (TV film)	Carrie	1997
Performance at the Mark Taper (Los Angeles)	Herself	1997
The Jeff Foxworthy Show	Nettie	1996 - 1997
Annie (Atlanta - Fox Theatre)	Annie Bennett Warbucks	1997
The Crew	Karen 'G-String'	1995
The Story of Santa Claus (TV special)	Aurora (voice role)	1996
Bringing up Jack	Molly McMahon	1995
Full House	Elizabeth "Lisa" Leeper	1994 - 1995
Ruthless!	Tina	1994
Sisters	Roxanne "Roxie" Whatley	1994 - 1995
Macy's Thanksgiving Day Parade (Annie Warbucks performance)	Herself	1993
Annie Warbucks	Annie Bennett Warbucks	1993 - 1994
Macy's Thanksgiving Day Parade	Herself	1992

== Recordings ==
Title	Role	Year
Annie Warbucks Original Cast Recording	Annie Bennett Warbucks	1993
Incurably Romantic: Songs of Martin Charnin	Herself	1996
Broadway Kids Sing Broadway	Herself	1996

== Books ==
- The Story of Zimbie Zooella (2013)
