= Chris Trousdale =

American singer, actor (1985–2020)

- Born: Christopher Ryan Pask; June 11, 1985; New Port Richey, Florida
- Died: June 2, 2020 (aged 34); Burbank, California, U.S.
- Occupations: Singer, actor, dancer
- Years active: 1993–2020
- Musical career
- Genres: Broadway music, pop
- Instrument: Vocals
- Formerly of: Dream Street

Christopher Ryan Pask (June 11, 1985 – June 2, 2020), known professionally as Chris Trousdale, was an American singer, dancer and actor. He was a member of The Broadway Kids and the boy band Dream Street, working with Jesse McCartney, Frankie J. Galasso, Greg Raposo, and Matt Ballinger.

== Early life ==
Trousdale was the son of Helena Pask Trousdale and her first husband William Sakelson. His parents divorced and his mother remarried Wayne Trousdale. His stepfather's name became his stage name.

== Career ==
Trousdale began his Broadway career when he was eight years old, touring with the production of Les Misérables, where he starred alongside Ashley Tisdale. He was later cast as Friedrich von Trapp in the 1998 Broadway revival of The Sound of Music. After a successful run, he moved to New York City to join the Broadway production of the play with Ricky Martin and Lea Michele of Glee. While in New York, he joined the well known children's group The Broadway Kids (past members include Christy Carlson Romano, Jenna Ushkowitz, Gregory Raposo, and Lacey Chabert) and performed in popular plays such as Beauty and the Beast, The Wizard of Oz, and the Radio City Christmas Spectacular.

When he was 14 years old, Trousdale caught the attention of two producers who were putting together a boy band in New York City. Consisting of five members, including former Sugar Beats member Jesse McCartney and former Broadway Kids bandmate Greg Raposo, he joined Dream Street in 1999. Chris Trousdale met Greg Raposo during their time in The Broadway Kids. They were later reunited for Dream Street. Dream Street released their debut album Dream Street in 2000. They released their finale album "The Biggest Fan" in 2002. After releasing The Biggest Fan, Dream Street broke up.

Trousdale would go on to pursue a solo career with the managers of Dream Street; he was soon signed to Columbia Records and even heading to go on tour with the likes of Aaron Carter and Play. However, Columbia would want Trousdale to be part of a new Dream Street boyband, something Trousdale and his managers did not want to do. As the managers would argue with the executives of Columbia, Columbia would drop the managers and then drop Trousdale from the record label, leaving him an unsigned artist by 2005. Trousdale would then be dropped from tours such as Aaron Carter's.

Trousdale went on to record "Kissless Christmas" and "Wild Christmas" for School's Out! Christmas album in addition to the popular duets with the girl group Play (rendition of "I'm Gonna Make You Love Me") and solo artist Nikki Cleary (remake of the Grease track "You're the One That I Want"), which were huge hits on Radio Disney. However, shortly after his solo career started to take off, Trousdale put his career on hold in 2006 and moved back home to Michigan to take care of his ailing mother.

In 2009, Trousdale did an interview where it was mentioned an album was expected to drop that same year; however, it was never released.

In 2012, Trousdale auditioned on The Voice.

On June 30, 2014, Trousdale announced via Twitter that he had joined the Spectra Music Group to work on his solo album.

In 2015, Trousdale taught dance classes at Artworks Studio in Big Rapids, Michigan.

In February 2019, Trousdale announced via his social media accounts – repeated in his June 2019 interview on Famous Birthdays – that he planned to release an EP in August or September; however, no new EP nor album had been released by his death in June 2020.

== Personal life ==
Trousdale was often private when it came to his personal affairs. Shortly after Dream Street broke up in 2002, he participated in an interview along with the other four members, and words of animosity and bitterness were said among all five with the four being against Trousdale and Trousdale against the four. As years went on, Trousdale would mention he still spoke to members such as Jesse McCartney; McCartney never confirmed he remained in touch with Trousdale nor have Ballinger or Galasso. Trousdale and Raposo would begin to build a new friendship with one another, often meeting while the two were in New York, as displayed on one another's Instagram accounts.

Throughout the years, there were rumors of Trousdale's sexuality and although he supported LGBT rights, he, himself, never publicly confirmed his sexuality. It was revealed in June 2019 from an interview with Famous Birthdays, Trousdale received his first kisses while on Broadway, from Ashley Tisdale and Lea Michele. In a 2020 interview after his death, the crew and cast members of A New York Christmas Wedding revealed that Trousdale was an "openly gay actor".

== Death ==
On June 2, 2020, Trousdale died at a hospital in Burbank, California at the age of 34 from complications of an illness. It was stated that a strep infection had shut his body down and placed him in a coma. Although many sources stated that the death was from COVID-19 complications, including Trousdale's sister-in-law, Tracey Pask, his family and managers have stated the death was caused by an 'undisclosed illness' to various outlets.

On June 11, 2020, what would have been his 35th birthday, his former Dream Street bandmates reunited online for a virtual acoustic performance of their song "It Happens Every Time" that is dedicated to Trousdale. The end of this video contains a written message: “In Loving Memory of Our Friend Chris”.

On June 11, 2023, former Dream Street members Greg Raposo, Frankie J. Galasso, & Matt Ballinger released the single entitled, "Smile" on what would have been his 38th birthday in honor of him. (Note: Jesse McCartney left the group prior to the lawsuits in 2002 and he is no longer an official member and did not perform in "Smile")

== Filmography ==
Film roles
Year	Title	Role	Notes
2005	The Biggest Fan (Note: The film was completed in 2002 and released in 2005)	Himself	
2008	The Candlelight Murders	Ed Dines	Movie also goes by 'Seducing Spirits'
2009	Gone Astray		
2014	Dance Off	Joshua	
2018	To the Beat	Himself	
2020	A New York Christmas Wedding	Wedding Singer	Posthumous release

Television roles
Year	Title	Role	Notes
2011	Days of Our Lives	Cory	1 episode
2011	Shake It Up	Justin Starr	Episode: "Age It Up"
2012	The Voice	Himself	
2015	Austin & Ally	Rupert	Episode: "Burdens and Boynado"
2016	Lucifer	Young band boy	Episode: Pilot
