= Toothless (film) =

- DVD cover
- Genre: Fantasy comedy
- Written by: Mark S. Kaufman
- Directed by: Melanie Mayron
- Starring: Kirstie Alley; Dale Midkiff; Ross Malinger; Daryl "Chill" Mitchell; Kathryn Zaremba; Marcus Toji; Melanie Mayron; Lynn Redgrave
- Music by: David Michael Frank
- Country of origin: United States
- Original language: English

Production
- Executive producer: David Hoberman
- Producer: Joan Van Horn
- Cinematography: Sandi Sissel
- Editor: Henk van Eeghen
- Running time: 92 minutes
- Production companies: Mandeville Films; Walt Disney Telefilms

Original release
- Network: ABC
- Release: October 5, 1997

Toothless is a 1997 American fantasy comedy television film that first aired as part of The Wonderful World of Disney on ABC on October 5, 1997, and produced by Disney Telefilms and Mandeville Films. It was directed by Melanie Mayron, written by Mark S. Kaufman, and stars Kirstie Alley, with Dale Midkiff, Ross Malinger, Daryl "Chill" Mitchell, Kathryn Zaremba, Marcus Toji, Mayron, and Lynn Redgrave in supporting roles.

== Plot ==
Katherine Lewis, having been a dentist since her late father and grandfather had each been one, is killed after being struck by a bike messenger. She awakens to find herself in Limbo, a place between Heaven and Hell. In Limbo, Katherine is told that she must perform community service as a mythological being before going to Heaven. Katherine signs a contract to be the Tooth Fairy and is trained by a worker named Raul on how to perform her service.

On her first night on the job, Katherine visits a lonely 12-year-old boy named Bobby Jameson and is accidentally discovered by him. As it turns out, children who have baby teeth can see her, while those who have lost all of theirs cannot, as the loss of baby teeth represents the loss of innocence required to see magical beings and creatures. The next day at school, a bully named Jeff and his gang ambush Bobby, and one of them punches him and knocks out another one of his teeth. Katherine comes to visit Bobby again that night and discovers that his mother had died of cancer and his father, Thomas is always busy at work. Katherine decides to help Bobby and his friends at his school with their problems, which lands her in trouble with the higher-ups in Limbo, as revealing herself to living humans is a grievous infraction. However, she has an all-time high approval rating as Tooth Fairy and is let off with a warning. Katherine feels that the children's needs are greater than hers and asks for Raul's help in making her visible to the parents and the school principal so she can prove that she is real and Bobby is not insane. Raul is touched that Katherine is willing to sacrifice her chance to go to Heaven to help Bobby and his friends and agrees to help her.

Katherine succeeds in becoming visible to the adults by "letting her guard down" and showing Bobby that she cares for him. She proceeds to tell off the parents and principal but is sent back to Limbo once again for revealing herself to humans. Once there, Rogers, the supervisor of Limbo, sends Katherine to the Hellavator to be sent to Hell. After saying goodbye to Raul, she begins her descent but suddenly finds herself alive and back on Earth. She learns from Raul that not only was she dreaming, but she has been given a second chance at life, as well. She later notices Rogers as a traffic cop who mouths to her that she is watching her. This suggests that Katherine wasn't dreaming after all.

Katherine returns to her job as a dentist with a newfound love of life. She finds Bobby Jameson, a new patient, waiting for his appointment with her. She explains what happened and goes on to live her life to its fullest. After she removes his last baby tooth, though, all of his memories of her as the Tooth Fairy are lost, and she is saddened that he no longer remembers her. However, Bobby's father recognizes her from when she turned visible. Katherine asks Thomas and Bobby to go to a baseball game with her, and they accept, which implies the blooming of a romance between Thomas and Katherine which could result in her becoming Bobby's stepmother.

== Cast ==
- Kirstie Alley as Dr. Katherine Lewis
  - Jamie Renée Smith as Young Katherine
- Dale Midkiff as Thomas Jameson
- Ross Malinger as Bobby Jameson
- Daryl "Chill" Mitchell as Raul
- Kathryn Zaremba as Carrie
- Marcus Toji as Trevor
- Melanie Mayron as Mindy
- Lynn Redgrave as Rogers
- Kimberly Scott as Gwen
- John P. Connolly as Dr. Green
- Catlin Adams as Carrie's Mother
- Patrick Kerr as Mr. Wood
- Jake Richardson as Jeff
- Arjay Smith as Phil
- Eileen Brennan as Joe #1
- Joel Swetow as Joe #2
- Kaley Cuoco as Lori
- Lindze Letherman as Molly
- Helen Slater as Mrs. Lewis
- Lewis Smith as Young Hot Guy
- Yeardley Smith as Gatekeeper
- Joel Brooks as Principal Norris

== Production ==
The script by Mark S. Kaufman was originally intended as a theatrical release but was retooled as a television film for The Wonderful World of Disney due in part to the downward trends in box office returns experienced by family films.

== Reception ==
During its initial broadcast, Toothless scored an 8.4 in the Nielsen ratings translating to viewership of roughly 8.2 million households.
