= Greg Raposo =

American singer and actor

- Raposo in 2008

Background information
- Also known as: Gregory Raposo
- Born: Gregory Frank Raposo; May 3, 1985 (age 41)
- Origin: Long Island, New York
- Genres: Pop, Rock
- Years active: 1993–2002; 2023–present; (group) (Dream Street); 2003–2005 - Greg Raposo (solo); 2005–2007 - Raposo (band - 1st Incarnation); 2007 - Stereopath (band); 2008–present - Raposo (band - 2nd Incarnation)
- Label: Independent
- Spouse: Julie Cordero (m. 2014)

Gregory Frank Raposo, known professionally as Greg Raposo (born May 3, 1985), is an American rock'n'roll singer and actor. Raposo initially came to fame in the early 2000s as a member of the boy band Dream Street, but has subsequently branched out into a solo career as a rock singer. (Note: Dream Street was revived in 2023 with Raposo, Galasso, and Ballinger returning.) His self-titled debut solo album Greg Raposo was released in 2003 and charted at #40 on the Independent Albums Chart in its opening week. His follow up 2012 release Loss Love Life was released independently.

== Early life ==
Raposo was born Gregory Frank Raposo on May 3, 1985 to Maryann (née Femia) and Octavio Raposo. When Raposo was two years old, he began to develop a fascination with the guitar. When he was six years old, his mother decided that she was tired of having to buy more toy guitars because he kept breaking them, so she bought him his first real guitar and arranged for him to take guitar lessons with a private teacher. Raposo was soon after entered into a talent contest. He won, singing an Elvis Presley song. His aunt entered him on Star Search where he took second place and was referred to a talent agent.

== Career ==
=== 1993–1998: Career beginnings, "The Elvis Kid", and broadway ===
Raposo was cast in sixteen regional and national commercials for everything from Kit Kat bars to Crest toothpaste. Then at nine, he requested to be allowed to sing and play guitar on-air during a local live recording of a radio show on WPLJ. Deejay Scott Shannon agreed and Greg went on the air. Shannon thought that Greg was very talented and from that day on was crowned as "The Elvis Kid". Greg appeared on WPLJ for three years. "The Elvis Kid" performed everywhere, including with The Jordanaires and DJ Fontana who were Elvis' real backup band. Greg was the only child invited to perform at Graceland for the 20th anniversary of Elvis Presley's death (1997) by Priscilla Presley.

In 1996, Raposo auditioned for 'Broadway on Broadway', an extravaganza of Broadway performers. Greg got the honor of being the opener for the show and sang an original composition in front of fifty-thousand people. After opening for 'Broadway on Broadway', he was cast in an off-Broadway singing group called "The Broadway Kids", with whom he recorded two albums. During his time in The Broadway Kids Greg met Chris Trousdale. In 1998, both boys successfully auditioned for a group called "Boy Wonder". "Boy Wonder" was disbanded for lack of interest from sponsors. Raposo and Trousdale were later reunited for Dream Street.

Raposo was also involved with several charity and anti-substance abuse groups. This included: The Kids for Kids Project, Audrey Hepburn/Children's Fund, Young Plaza Ambassadors Club, Jerry's Kids, and Variety, the Children's Charity. Raposo claims that Kids for Kids was the most fulfilling thing he has ever participated in.

=== 1999–2002: Rise to fame and Dream Street ===
Originally named 'Boy Wonder' (a name borrowed from the nickname of comic book character Robin from the Batman comics and films), Dream Street was put together by music producers Louis Baldonieri and Brian Lukow in 1999. Raposo along with Trousdale were already a shoo-in for the Dream Street auditions since they were the original member of 'Boy Wonder'. After casting two-hundred boys, Jesse McCartney, Frankie J. Galasso, and Matt Ballinger joined the group.

Their eponymous debut album was released on July 10, 2001. It was certified Gold in the US by the RIAA peaking No. 1 on Billboard's Independent Albums chart and at No. 37 on the Billboard 200. The songs, "It Happens Every Time" and "I Say Yeah" were frequently played on Radio Disney. The boys soon made appearances to perform on various talk shows and television events including Maury and Ricki Lake.

While the rising success of Dream Street was growing, tensions between the music producers and the boys' parents also arise. This led to a lawsuit that would force the members to disband in 2002. The final Dream Street release was the soundtrack album to the 2002 film The Biggest Fan, which starred Trousdale. Raposo has appeared as himself in the film as well.

=== 2002–2004: Solo career, Greg Raposo, and Radio Disney ===
He performed his first solo concert on October 13, 2002, at The Downtown in Farmingdale, New York. Tickets sold out in less than two hours and a second concert was issued for the same venue, which also sold out. He subsequently performed at several radio station multi-artist shows, solo acts, and as an opening act for several bands.

On May 3, 2003, Raposo's first solo single, "Take Me Back Home", premiered on Radio Disney as a part of their "Music Mailbag" segment. It received positive ratings, and won a spot on the station's playlist with 92% of the popular vote—setting records on Radio Disney. His second single, "Every Summer", premiered on the Radio Disney Music Mailbag on July 12, 2003, with 95% of the popular vote.

Raposo's eponymous debut album was released on September 2, 2003. The album was in the top fifty on the Billboard Top Sales chart (#40) and was #67 on the Billboard Top Heat Seekers chart the week of its release. The second single from the album, "Every Summer", debuted on the Radio Disney Top 30 Countdown on September 14, 2003, at spot #22. He debuted on the RadioDisney.com Top 3 with "Every Summer" on November 19, 2003, at the #3 spot.

In November 2003, Greg embarked on his first national tour as a headlining act, co-heading with Stevie Brock for the Radio Disney Jingle Jam Tour, with former Dream Street band mate Jesse McCartney opening. The tour hit nineteen cities across the United States and the average audience size was around 2000 people for each venue. Greg's first single, "Take Me Back Home", was officially added to the Radio Disney playlist on November 21, 2003. During 2004, Raposo would appear in a film Destination Fame.

=== 2005–2008: Rock band "Raposo" era ===
The band Raposo went through three incarnations; from the original line-up, RAPOSO to Stereopath then back to Raposo for a short period of time before rebranding as Dead Celebrities.

==== 2005–2006: Raposo ====
Through years of various band formations, Raposo finally found what he was looking for in lead guitarist Nick Slobodskoy. Nick was first a classically trained violinist, but that all changed when he was introduced to the music of Guns N' Roses and purchased his first guitar. Nick formed rock band Floffus and later joined local band Brookside, sharing the stage with such national acts as Thursday, Taking Back Sunday, The Starting Line, Wheatus and Superdrag. Drummer Lou Vecchio started playing drums from an extremely young age. This third-generation drummer cites his father, Louis Vecchio, among his many idols. Endorsed by MRP Drums, Lou is recognized as one of the best drummers on Long Island originally form the famous NY band Unlikely Heroes . His tight rhythms and passionate playing brings a distinctive groove to the RAPOSO sound. Bassist Jakey Lee grew up on classic rock. He was in Brookside for several tours and played with Nick. He had also done some studio sessions with Lou, and their chemistry was already there. Matching Lou's tight rhythms brought Jake into the fold as the final member of RAPOSO.

==== 2007: Stereopath ====
The second incarnation of Raposo, Stereopath existed until guitarist Nick Slobodskoy left in February 2008. The band recorded an unreleased 6-song EP entitled "Stereopath".

==== 2008: Dead Celebrities ====
The third incarnation of Raposo began in May 2008. Its members are Greg, Jesse Leo, Brian Corona, Danny Miller, and Drummer Dan Leo. Jesse and Brian formerly led Long Island-based The Unlikely Heroes. Dan Leo was the drummer of bands Diffuser(Hollywood Records)and Action Action(Victory). The third incarnation of RAPOSO were semi-finalists in the MTV2 Battle of the Bands for a spot on the RockBand II Tour and finished the voting process ranked in the top two. They changed their name to Dead Celebrities, recorded an album (which never released), and disbanded. During 2008, Raposo acted as Gary in the film Return to Sleepaway Camp.

=== 2012: Loss, Love, Life ===
After a three-year hiatus, Raposo returned to a solo career. He released the independent album "Loss, Love, Life", in memoriam of his cousin, Theresa Buccellato (1994–2010), on May 3, 2012, funded by a Kickstarter initiative. The music video for his first independent single, "That Day", was produced in New York City and released online on May 15, 2012. Reviews have praised "Loss, Love, Life" for being "genuine" and "not sounding like a slightly older boy band." In the summer of 2012, Raposo featured on the Rock Camp Tour around New York, New Jersey, and Long Island. It was around this time when Raposo and his girlfriend decided to change to an “open” relationship. There is speculation that she had developed feelings for one of Raposo's old band members

=== 2020: Chris Trousdale tribute ===
On June 2, 2020, Raposo's former Dream Street bandmate Chris Trousdale died at a hospital in Burbank, California, at the age of 34 due to complications from an unknown illness during the COVID-19 pandemic in California. It was later revealed that COVID-19 was the main complication of Trousdale's death. On June 11, 2020, on what would be Trousdale's 35th birthday, Raposo and his former Dream Street bandmates Jesse McCartney, Frankie Galasso, and Matt Ballinger reunited for a virtual performance of "It Happens Every Time" to pay tribute to Trousdale. This would be the first public appearance of Dream Street together as a group since the disbandment over the lawsuits prior.

=== 2023: Podcast interview, New albums, & Dream Street revival ===
In April 2023, Raposo and members Matt Ballinger & Frankie J. Galasso were interviewed on the podcast, Frosted Tips with Lance Bass hosted by Lance Bass.

On April 20, 2023, Raposo released the independent album, "Dead Celebrities".

On May 12, 2023, Raposo uploaded a short clip to Instagram of him, Matt Ballinger, & Frankie J. Galasso working on what appears to be new Dream Street music and material.

On June 11, 2023, Raposo and Dream Street members Frankie J. Galasso, & Matt Ballinger released the single entitled, "Smile" on what would have been former band member, Chris Trousdale's 38th birthday in honor of him following his death in 2020. (Note: Jesse McCartney left the group prior to the lawsuits in 2002 meaning he is no longer an official member and did not perform in "Smile")

The official music video for "Smile" was uploaded to Raposo's YouTube channel the following day.

On August 8, 2023, Raposo released the album entitled "City Country".

In February 2024, It was announced that Matt Ballinger and Greg Raposo would be attending Pop2000 In Paradise at the Villa del Palmar Flamingos Beach Resort & Spa Riviera Nayarit in Nuevo Vallarta, Mexico from September 28 to October 3, 2024.

It was revealed in June 2024 that Frankie had stepped back from the band's revival, leaving Ballinger and Raposo as a duo.

On April 25, 2025, Raposo released the single entitled "Wasn't You Wasn't Me" featuring NICO. The official lyric video was released April 30, 2025.

In May 2025, it was revealed that Dream Street would be performing alongside British rock band BBMak in June 2025.

On June 18, 2025, Dream Street performed alongside BBMak at StageOne at FTC in Fairfield, Connecticut and on June 23, 2025 at City Winery New York City in downtown Manhattan.

== Personal life ==
Raposo began dating Julie Cordero in 2005. They married in September 2014 after 9 years of dating. Together, they have four children.
