= Dream Street =

American boy band

- Clockwise from top: Chris Trousdale, Jesse McCartney, Matt Ballinger, Greg Raposo, Frankie Galasso

Background information
- Origin: New York City, U.S.
- Genres: Pop; teen pop; dance-pop
- Years active: 1999–2002; 2023–present
- Labels: Edel; Columbia
- Members: Matt Ballinger; Greg Raposo
- Past members: Jesse McCartney (Note: McCartney briefly reunited with the group on April 27, 2024.); Chris Trousdale (Note: Trousdale died of COVID complications in 2020.); Frankie Galasso

Dream Street is an American pop boy band that was formed in 1999 by Louis Baldonieri and Brian Lukow. The band disbanded in 2002 following a legal dispute between parents of the band members and the band's managers. In 2023, the band was revived with members Greg Raposo, Frankie J. Galasso, and Matt Ballinger returning. (Note: Galasso rejoined the band in 2023 but stepped back from the band's revival in 2024.)

== History ==
=== Formation and debut album ===
The group was initially put together by music producers Louis Baldonieri and Brian Lukow. Originally named 'Boy Wonder' (a name borrowed from the nickname of comic book character Robin from the Batman comics and films), the band featured several boys aged 12–14 from the New York Broadway/Acting scene. Baldonieri and Lukow hoped to make an impact on the pop music industry by introducing a group of teenagers to the scene, all of whom had prior stage-singing experience. Among these original members were former The Broadway Kids members Greg Raposo and Chris Trousdale, who would continue on into the remade group from 1999 until 2002. The lineup was changed not long after they debuted the show in front of several talent agents and record label reps. Their debut included a tap dance number and a jazzy theme song, both of which were sacked quickly after. It also included a cover of the popular song from the musical Rent "Seasons of Love".

Matt Ballinger, Frankie J. Galasso, and Jesse McCartney soon join the band with Raposo and Trousdale as they would become the new faces of the group and were given the name "Dream Street", which was the name of Lukow and Baldonieri's recording studio in New York City. With the new group members added, and with most of the jazzy Broadway songs scrapped, the only original song Lukow and Baldonieri kept for the band was titled "Jennifer Goodbye", which was initially written for Lukow's fiance, then was changed into its teen-pop incarnation months later. Their eponymous debut album was released on July 10, 2001. It was certified Gold in the US by the RIAA peaking No. 1 on Billboard's Independent Albums chart and at No. 37 on the Billboard 200. The songs, "It Happens Every Time" and "I Say Yeah" were frequently played on Radio Disney. The boys soon made appearances to perform on various talk shows and television events. On July 18, 2000, the soundtrack for Pokémon the Movie 2000 was released featuring their song "They Don't Understand (Pokemon Version)". (Note: The song was later reworked for their self-titled debut album entitled, "Dream Street" which was released on July 10, 2001 and was simply called "They Don't Understand" with lyrical changes.) That same year, the soundtrack for the film The Little Vampire included their track “Let’s Get Funky Tonight.” In late 2000, Dream Street made an appearance on a show that fellow member McCartney had a recurring role on, ABC's All My Children. The final Dream Street release was the soundtrack album to the 2002 film The Biggest Fan, which starred Trousdale.

=== Dissolution of band and 2020 tribute ===
In mid-2002, parents of the band members reportedly filed a lawsuit against Baldonieri and Lukow, alleging that the underage band members were "exposed to booze, women, and pornography." They have mentioned in multiple recent podcasts that these were just rumors and untrue. While McCartney had left the group prior to the court hearing, Ballinger, Raposo, and Galasso wanted to continue on as a trio and sing Dream Street songs; however, the court did not allow this arrangement because Trousdale was, contractually, still in the group. In August 2002, the court ruled in favor of the five band members' parents, releasing the band members from their contracts. There was a later attempt to create a new Dream Street consisting of Trousdale and four new boys, but this proposal never came to fruition.

After the disbandment of Dream Street, Edel Entertainment severed ties with Sony Music Entertainment and Atlantic Records, leaving the master recordings of audio and video with no distributor in the US. After years of inactivity, Lukow became the president of All for One Media in 2017. Lukow currently retains complete ownership of Dream Street's master recordings through All For One Media. In the second quarter of 2019, All for One Media announced that they were in the process of working on a documentary titled The Rise and Fall of Dream Street, which would include never-before-seen footage of the band and updated interviews of past band members.

On June 11, 2020, Ballinger, Galasso, McCartney, and Raposo reunited for a virtual performance of "It Happens Every Time" to pay tribute to Trousdale following his death.

=== 2023 revival ===
In April 2023, members Greg Raposo, Matt Ballinger, and Frankie J. Galasso were interviewed on the podcast, Frosted Tips with Lance Bass hosted by Lance Bass. On May 12, 2023, Raposo uploaded a short clip to Instagram of him, and Galasso working on what appears to be new Dream Street music and material. On June 11, 2023, Raposo, Galasso, and Ballinger released the single "Smile" on what would have been former band member Chris Trousdale's 38th birthday in honor of him following his death in 2020. (Note: Jesse McCartney left the group prior to the lawsuits in 2002 meaning he is no longer an official member and did not perform in "Smile") The official music video for "Smile" was uploaded to Raposo's YouTube channel the following day.

On December 13, 2023, Dream Street launched an official Instagram page. In February 2024, It was announced that Ballinger and Raposo would be attending Pop2000 In Paradise at the Villa del Palmar Flamingos Beach Resort & Spa Riviera Nayarit in Nuevo Vallarta, Mexico from September 28 to October 3, 2024. On April 27, 2024, Jesse McCartney briefly reunited with his former bandmates after one of his performances during his All's Well tour at the Empire Live in New York City, where they all performed a rendition of their original cover of the song entitled, "Sugar Rush" originally performed by A-Teens.

It was revealed in June 2024 that Frankie J. Galasso had stepped back from the band's revival, leaving Ballinger and Raposo as a duo. In May 2025, it was revealed that Dream Street would be performing alongside British rock band BBMak in June 2025. On June 18, 2025, Dream Street performed alongside BBMak at StageOne at FTC in Fairfield, Connecticut and on June 23, 2025 at City Winery New York City in downtown Manhattan. It was revealed in August 2025 that the duo is working on a new album.

== Post-break-up careers ==
- Matt Ballinger did not go solo, he went on to be the lead singer for a band called The Juice, which broke up in 2008. He is currently the lead singer in a band named Open Till Midnight. He has also acted in television and films, including small roles in episodes of Law & Order, Bored to Death, and 30 Rock, and acted on stage in productions of The Sound of Music and The King & I. Ballinger married Danielle Manning on August 24, 2013, who had interviewed Dream Street when she was 14 years old. He rejoined the group for its revival in 2023.
- Frankie J. Galasso is also a solo singer. In 2009, Galasso auditioned for Glee, but did not make it. So far, Galasso has released one album to Amazon on iTunes, containing three songs. Following the breakup of the band, Galasso was in a 2003 movie called "A Tale of Two Pizzas". Galasso has also performed with the First National Tour of Jersey Boys. He rejoined the group for its revival in 2023 and stepped back in 2024 to once again pursue a solo career.

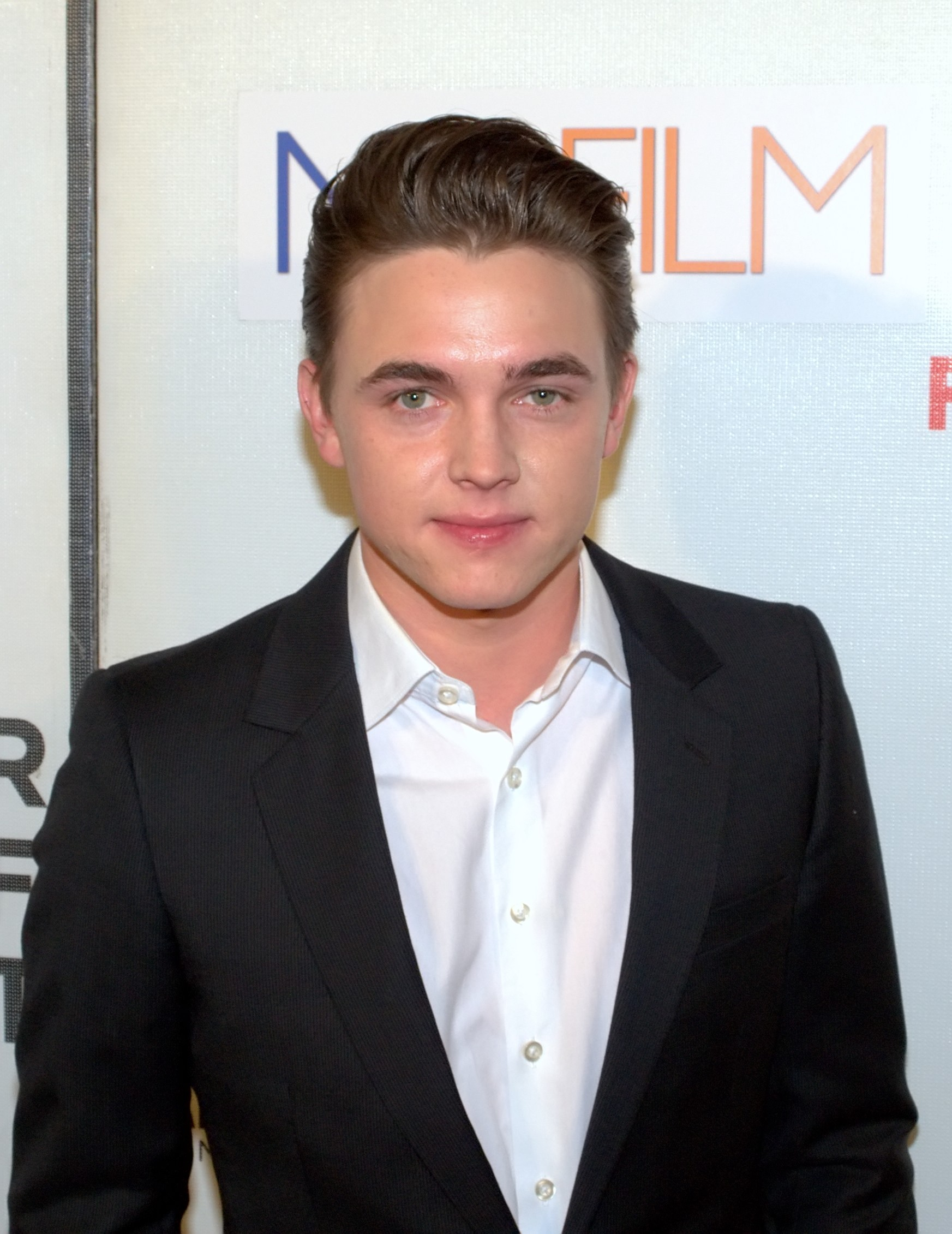
McCartney at the 2010 Tribeca Film Festival premiere of Beware the Gonzo.

- Jesse McCartney has enjoyed a successful solo career releasing four albums and spawning numerous top 40 singles. He topped the Billboard Hot 100 for the first time through his co-writing of Leona Lewis' 2007 song "Bleeding Love". He's appeared on many television shows, including Disney's Hannah Montana and The Suite Life of Zack & Cody, as well as a 2008 episode of Law & Order: Special Victims Unit. McCartney had a starring role on The WB's show Summerland, alongside future stars like Zac Efron, and was set to star in Locke and Key; however, the pilot was not picked up for an entire season. In 2008, McCartney was cast as the lead role in the independent film Keith. McCartney had a recurring role in Season 4 of the ABC Family series, Greek, and appeared as a lead in the 2012 movie Chernobyl Diaries, which was a moderate box office success. In June 2011, McCartney released a fragrance for women, "Wanted". McCartney has also forayed into voice acting, performing as Dick Grayson on the show Young Justice, Terence in the Tinker Bell films, Theodore in the Alvin and the Chipmunks films, and Roxas and Ventus in the Kingdom Hearts video game series. He starred on the series Young & Hungry as Cooper. In 2020, McCartney appeared in the third season of The Masked Singer as the "Turtle".

Raposo in 2008 during a Concert

- Greg Raposo has been continuing his music career, performing in bands called "Raposo" and "Dead Celebrities". He is also a real estate investor and developer. Raposo is currently playing solo, mostly on the east coast but has toured as far as Japan and Costa Rica. Following the Dream Street breakup, Raposo released a self-titled album in 2003 that charted on the Billboard Independent Albums Chart at No. 40 during its opening week. His second solo album, LossLoveLife was fully funded by his fans through Kickstarter and released in May 2012. Fans also funded Raposo's first official music video for the first single off his new album, That Day, which he wrote for a fan with cancer. Raposo has produced for many young artists and signed a licensing deal for his original material. He rejoined the group for its revival in 2023.
- Following the breakup of Dream Street, Chris Trousdale started a solo career, even being in a second movie with Kaila Amariah called "Seducing Spirits". He took a short break from the limelight to be with his family. In 2010, Trousdale appeared on the Shake It Up episode "Age It Up" as a parody of Justin Bieber. Trousdale also appeared on the show Days of Our Lives, and auditioned for The Voice in 2012, but did not make it past the blind auditions. Trousdale died on June 2, 2020, from an undisclosed illness which some sources reported to be COVID-19.

== Discography ==
=== Albums ===
| Year | Title | Details | Peak chart position |
|---|---|---|---|
| 2001 | Dream Street | Released: July 10, 2001; Label: Edel, UEG Records; Format: CD, cassette, Digital download; Album type: Studio | US: 37 |
| 2002 | The Biggest Fan | Released: November 23, 2002; Label: Columbia; Format: CD, cassette, Digital download; Album type: Soundtrack | |

=== Singles ===
| Title | Year | Peak chart positions | Album |
| Title | Year | US Singles Sales | Album |
|---|---|---|---|
| "It Happens Every Time" | 2000 | 48 | Dream Street |
| "I Say Yeah" | 2001 | — | Dream Street |
| "With All My Heart" | 2002 | — | The Biggest Fan |
| "Smile" | 2023 | — | |

== Videography ==
Home Release
| Title | Details | Notes |
|---|---|---|
| Dream Street: Live in Concert | Released: 1999; Format: VHS | Recorded on December 17, 1999 at the Criterion Theatre as their debut live show. Discontinued after the release of Dream Street: Live. |
| Dream Street: Live | Released: November 2001; Format: VHS, DVD | Their only official live concert release. |
| The Biggest Fan | Released: May 17, 2005; Format: DVD | Filmed in 2002 but not released to DVD until 2005 due to the disbandment of the group. |
