= List of Adventures in Odyssey Books =

== Books ==
=== Imagination Station book series ===
Authored by Marianne Hering with Paul McCusker, Brock Eastman, Marshal Younger, Wayne Thomas Batson, Nancy Sanders, Chris Brack, and Sheila Seifert

- 1: Voyage with the Vikings
- 2: Attack at the Arena
- 3: Peril in the Palace
- 4: Revenge of the Red Knight
- 5: Showdown with the Shepherd
- 6: Problems in Plymouth
- 7: Secret of the Prince's Tomb
- 8: Battle for Cannibal Island
- 9: Escape to the Hiding Place
- 10: Challenge on the Hill of Fire
- 11: Hunt for the Devil's Dragon
- 12: Danger on a Silent Night
- 13: The Redcoats Are Coming!
- 14: Captured on the High Seas
- 15: Surprise at Yorktown
- 16: Doomsday in Pompeii
- 17: In Fear of the Spear
- 18: Trouble on the Orphan Train
- 19: Light in the Lions' Den
- 20: Inferno in Tokyo
- 21: Madman in Manhattan
- 22: Freedom at the Falls
- 23: Terror in the Tunnel
- 24: Rescue on the River
- 25: Poison at the Pump
- 26: Swept into the Sea
- 27: Refugees on the Run
- 28: Islands and Enemies
- 29: Sled Run for Survival
- 30: Land of the Lost
- 31: Big Risks in Russia
- 32: Courage at the Castle
- 33: Double Cross Down Under
- 34: Drought, Wind, and Fire
- 35: Faith in the Flames
- 36: Hope in the Ashes

=== The Blackgaard Chronicles book series ===
Authored by Phil Lollar

- 1: Opening Moves
- 2: Pawn's Play
- 3: Cross-Check
- 4: Rook's Ruse
- 5: Knight's Scheme
- 6: Bishop’s Block
- 7: Scotch Game
- The Rise (Compilation of Books 1-5).

=== Young Whit book series ===
Authored by Phil Lollar & Dave Arnold

- 1: Young Whit and the Traitor's Treasure
- 2: Young Whit and the Shroud of Secrecy
- 3: Young Whit and the Thieves of Barrymore
- 4: Young Whit and the Phantasmic Confabulator
- 5: Young Whit and the Cloth of Contention
- 6: Young Whit and the Shell Game
- The Glorious Burden (Compilation of Books 1-5)

=== Comic Books ===
- Captain Absolutely
- Captain Absolutely - Expanded Edition
- Elsewhere in Odyssey Comic Book #1
- Sleuth Family Robinson Comic Book

=== Original novels ===
Authored by Paul McCusker

- 1: Strange Journey Back
- 2: High Flyer with a Flat Tire
- 3: The Secret Cave of Robinwood
- 4: Behind the Locked Door
- 5: Lights Out at Camp What-a-Nut
- 6: The King's Quest
- 7: Danger Lies Ahead
- 8: Point of No Return
- 9: Dark Passage
- 10: Freedom Run
- 11: The Stranger's Message
- 12: A Carnival of Secrets
- Strange Journey Back (Compilation of Books 1-4)
- Danger Lies Ahead (Compilation of Books 5-7, 12)
- Point of No Return (Compilation of Books 8-11)

=== Passages spinoff book series ===
Authored by Paul McCusker

- 1. Darien's Rise
- 2. Arin's Judgement
- 3. Annison's Risk
- 4. Glennall's Betrayal
- 5. Draven's Defiance
- 6. Fendar's Legacy

=== Kidsboro spinoff book series ===
Authored by Marshal Younger

- 1. The Great Kidsboro Takeover
- 2. Battle for Control
- 3. The Rise and Fall of the Kidsborian Empire
- 4. The Creek War
- 5. The Risky Reunion
- The Fight for Kidsboro (Compilation)

=== Radio Scripts ===
- 1. Radio Scripts, Volume 1 by Paul McCusker
- 2. Radio Scripts, Volume 2 by Phil Lollar
- 3. Radio Scripts, Volume 3 by Paul McCusker

=== Candid Conversations with Connie book series ===
- 1. Candid Conversations With Connie (Also available in Audiobook)
- 2. Candid Conversations With Connie: Volume 2
- 3. Candid Conversations With Connie: Volume 3

=== Devotionals ===
- Adventures in Odyssey Devotions
- 90 Devotions for Kids (Available in paperback, and Leatherette)
- 90 Devotions for Kids in Matthew
- Mealtime Devotions
- Mealtime Devotions: The Second Helping
- Faith Launch (2008)

=== Bibles ===
- Adventures in Odyssey Bible (ICBV) (1996)
- Adventures in Odyssey Bible (NKJV) (2000)
- Adventures in Odyssey Bible (NIrV) (2017) (Available in Hardback, Brown Leatherette, and Purple Leatherette)
- Adventures in Odyssey New Testament (NIrV) (2019)

=== Mysteries in Odyssey series ===
- 1. The Case of the Mysterious Message
- 2. The Mystery of the Hooded Horseman

=== Guides ===
- The Complete Guide to Adventures in Odyssey by Phil Lollar
- Adventures in Odyssey: The Official Guide by Nathan Hoobler
- Adventures in Odyssey: The Official Guide-25th Birthday Edition by Nathan Hoobler

=== Adapted from Clubhouse Magazine ===
- Jones and Parker Case Files Book 1: Supersleuths
- Jones and Parker Case Files Book 2: The Nemesis
- Captain Absolutely
- Captain Absolutely - Expanded Edition
- Degrees of Kelvin: Good News for the Galaxy...and Beyond!

=== Video Series Adaptations ===
- The Last Days of Eugene Meltsner
- Escape from the Forbidden Matrix
- The Caves of Qumran

=== Video Series Novel ===
- Welcome to Odyssey: The Start of Something Big (based on the Video Series)

== See also ==
- Adventures in Odyssey
