= The Winning Edge =

The Winning Edge may refer to:

== Books ==
- The Winning Edge, 1973 book by Don Shula with Lou Sahadi
- The Winning Edge, 2001 cricketing book by Jack Potter

== Film and TV ==
- "The Winning Edge", a 1999 episode of Batman Beyond
- "The Winning Edge", 1987 segment of Four Corners that examined drugs in sport in Australia
- "The Winning Edge", a 1990 episode of Adventures in Odyssey
