= Hoobler =

Hoobler is a surname. Notable people with the surname include:

- Icie Hoobler (1892–1984), American biochemist
- Nathan Hoobler (born 1979), American writer, director, and producer
