= Paul McCusker =

American writer and producer (born 1958)

- Born: October 3, 1958 (age 67); Uniontown, Pennsylvania, U.S.
- Occupations: Writer; producer; director
- Years active: 1981–present
- Spouse: Elizabeth McCusker
- Children: 2
- Website: www.paulmccusker.com

Paul McCusker (born October 3, 1958) is an American writer and producer. He is best known for his work on Adventures in Odyssey, a nationally syndicated radio drama, and for his work with Focus on the Family's Radio Theatre. He has written over 50 books, 21 plays and 4 musicals. His best known works are the play "Catacombs", the novels The Mill House and Epiphany, and his audio adaptations of C.S. Lewis's works.

== Career ==
McCusker grew up in Bowie, Maryland. He graduated from college with a degree in journalism and spent several years writing copy for a local publisher. From the late 1970s, he began writing sketches and plays for his church, Grace Baptist, many of which were published and are still in print. Among his most popular plays are "Catacombs" and "First Church of Pete's Garage".

In 1985, McCusker moved to California to write for Continental Singers and their touring drama group The Jeremiah People. In 1988, he was invited by Focus on the Family to help develop a radio show for kids, which later became Adventures in Odyssey. He still consults on the show's scripts and writes them on occasion. He has also written 18 tie-in novels, including the "Passages" series.

In the late 1990s, McCusker developed Focus on the Family's Radio Theatre. He has also dramatized C.S. Lewis's The Chronicles of Narnia and The Screwtape Letters, as well as A Christmas Carol, Les Misérables, Amazing Grace, and the Father Gilbert Mysteries. He won a Peabody Award in 1997 for his work on Dietrich Bonhoeffer: The Cost of Freedom. Paul also writes novels, The Mill House and Epiphany being perhaps the best-known, and TSI: The Gabon Virus (2009) his most recent, which was co-written with Dr. Walt Larimore.

Paul has continued his audio drama efforts with the Augustine Institute, writing and directing Brother Francis, The Trials of Saint Patrick, Ode to Saint Cecilia, and The Legends of Robin Hood.

== Personal life ==
Paul McCusker moved to England with his wife in 1991 and lived in Hailsham and Winchester for a time. He was a Baptist until he attended an Anglican Church in England. Now he lives in Colorado Springs, Colorado with his wife Elizabeth and two children; Thomas and Eleanor. In 2007, he converted to Catholicism.
