= Adventures in Odyssey =

Evangelical Christian radio drama and comedy series

Adventures in Odyssey (AIO)
- Other names: Odyssey USA
- Genre: Radio comedy-drama
- Running time: 25 minutes
- Country of origin: United States; Canada
- Language: English
- Syndicates: Focus on the Family
- Starring: Hal Smith (1987–1994); Paul Herlinger (1996–2008); Andre Stojka (2009–2026); Phil Crowley (2026–present); Katie Leigh (1987–present); Will Ryan (1987–2000, 2005–2021); Walker Edmiston (1987–2007); Dave Madden (1988–2008); Earl Boen; Corey Burton (1991–2008); Pamela Hayden (1992–2000); Alan Young (1994–2012); Townsend Coleman (1994–present); Jess Harnell (2001–present); Audrey Wasilewski (2005–present); Chris Anthony
- Announcer: Chris Anthony
- Created by: Phil Lollar and Steve Harris
- Written by: Paul McCusker; Phil Lollar; Marshal Younger; Kathy Buchanan; Nathan Hoobler & many others
- Directed by: Phil Lollar; Paul McCusker; Marshal Younger; Bob Hoose; Nathan Hoobler
- Produced by: Bob Luttrell; Bob Hoose; Nathan Hoobler; Dave Arnold
- Executive producers: Dave Arnold (2005–present); Chuck Bolte (1987–1996); Paul McCusker (2000–2005); Kurt Bruner (1996–1998); Al Janssen (1998–2000)
- Edited by: Rudy Haerr; Nathan Jones; Christopher Diehl; Zach Schneider; Luke Geunot; Jonathan Crowe; Bob Luttrell; Todd Busteed; Mark Drury; Rob Jorgensen
- Recording studio: Salami Studios (current); Marc Graue Studios and other locations
- Original release: November 21, 1987 – present
- No. of episodes: Radio: 1,053 (including specials and currently unreleased episodes) Full list Video: 17; Books: 100 Full list
- Website: www.adventuresinodyssey.com
- Podcast: app.adventuresinodyssey.com/podcasts

Adventures in Odyssey (AIO), or simply Odyssey, is an evangelical Christian radio drama and comedy series created and produced by Focus on the Family. Primarily aimed at families with children aged 8–12, the series first aired in 1987 as a 13-episode pilot called Family Portraits and has recorded more than 1,050 episodes to date. In 2005, the show's daily audience averaged around 1.2 million within North America. The Odyssey radio series also includes several spin-off items, including a home-video series, several computer games, books, and devotionals. The series is set in the fictional town of Odyssey. Stories center around the people who live there, particularly ice-cream and discovery emporium owner John Avery Whittaker, who was originally voiced by Hal Smith.

== History ==
In 1982, Focus on the Family began creating several short dramas for inclusion in the ministry's daily half-hour radio show; these radio dramas were commissioned by Focus on the Family founder and then-president James Dobson as an alternative to Saturday-morning cartoons. This effort culminated in a thirteen-week test series titled Family Portraits which aired in early 1987. It was created by Steve Harris and Phil Lollar, who set it in a small Midwest town they called Odyssey. The test episodes engendered a favorable audience response, and led to a continuing radio program in November 1987, called Odyssey USA. The title was later changed in 1988 to Adventures in Odyssey to "increase international appeal".

The goal of the Odyssey staff was to create a "values-based" radio show with production values comparable with or surpassing those of most mainstream audio dramas. While the show aimed to promote Christian values, according to Odyssey's co-creator Phil Lollar, the goal is not to be "a preaching program", but to be an "entertaining program". Large amounts of work were put into each individual story; for the first few years, each thirty-minute episode typically took over one hundred hours to produce.

Several well-known voice actors were brought in to provide the lead roles. Hal Smith voiced the lead character John Avery Whittaker in one of his favorite roles. The rest of the original "key" characters were voiced by Katie Leigh, Will Ryan, and Walker Edmiston, who, along with Hal Smith, had all previously worked together extensively at Disney. Television star Dave Madden played the character "Bernard Walton" from 1990 to 2008.

When Hal Smith died in 1994, Adventures in Odyssey was left without its main character and Focus on the Family considered canceling the radio show. After a search that lasted over two years, a replacement voice was finally found in Paul Herlinger, who sounded very similar to Hal Smith. Herlinger voiced Whittaker from 1996 through 2008. Because of health issues, a mutual decision was made by Herlinger and the crew to replace Herlinger with another voice actor.

Consequently, Adventures in Odyssey took a long hiatus, with no new episodes planned while the staff searched for a new actor to voice Mr. Whittaker. In September 2009, Andre Stojka was selected as the third actor to voice Mr. Whittaker; only months later, on February 2, 2010, Paul Herlinger died from his illness. In March 2010, regular episodes resumed airing as Album 51, Take it from the Top, premiered.

As of 2022, Chris Anthony and Katie Leigh are the only original cast members remaining in the series.

The show has been adapted into Spanish audio and Hindi live-action videos, with plans to create Mandarin audio as well. On January 2, 2014, a subscription service for Adventures in Odyssey fans and their families launched, the Adventures In Odyssey Club. The subscription fee supports Focus on the Family as well as other world relief and ministry organizations. The Adventures In Odyssey Club is available internationally and had over 7,000 members in 2016. Main features of the club include access to over 1,000 Episodes from the Radio Series, as well as all 17 videos, every Official Podcast, and exclusive monthly episodes available only to club members.

=== Popularity ===
By the end of its second year in 1988, the show was on 634 radio stations in North America. As of 1995, it was the second-most popular Christian radio show in the United States. By 2002, the show was on over 6,000 stations worldwide.

Almost all the radio episodes have also been widely released on both cassette and CD collections, and by 1992, almost a million cassettes had been sold. Odyssey episodes have also been released annually (since 1990) as promotional items through Chick-fil-A. Several times, Chick-fil-A has had special CD sets as their "kids' meal" product.

== Characters ==
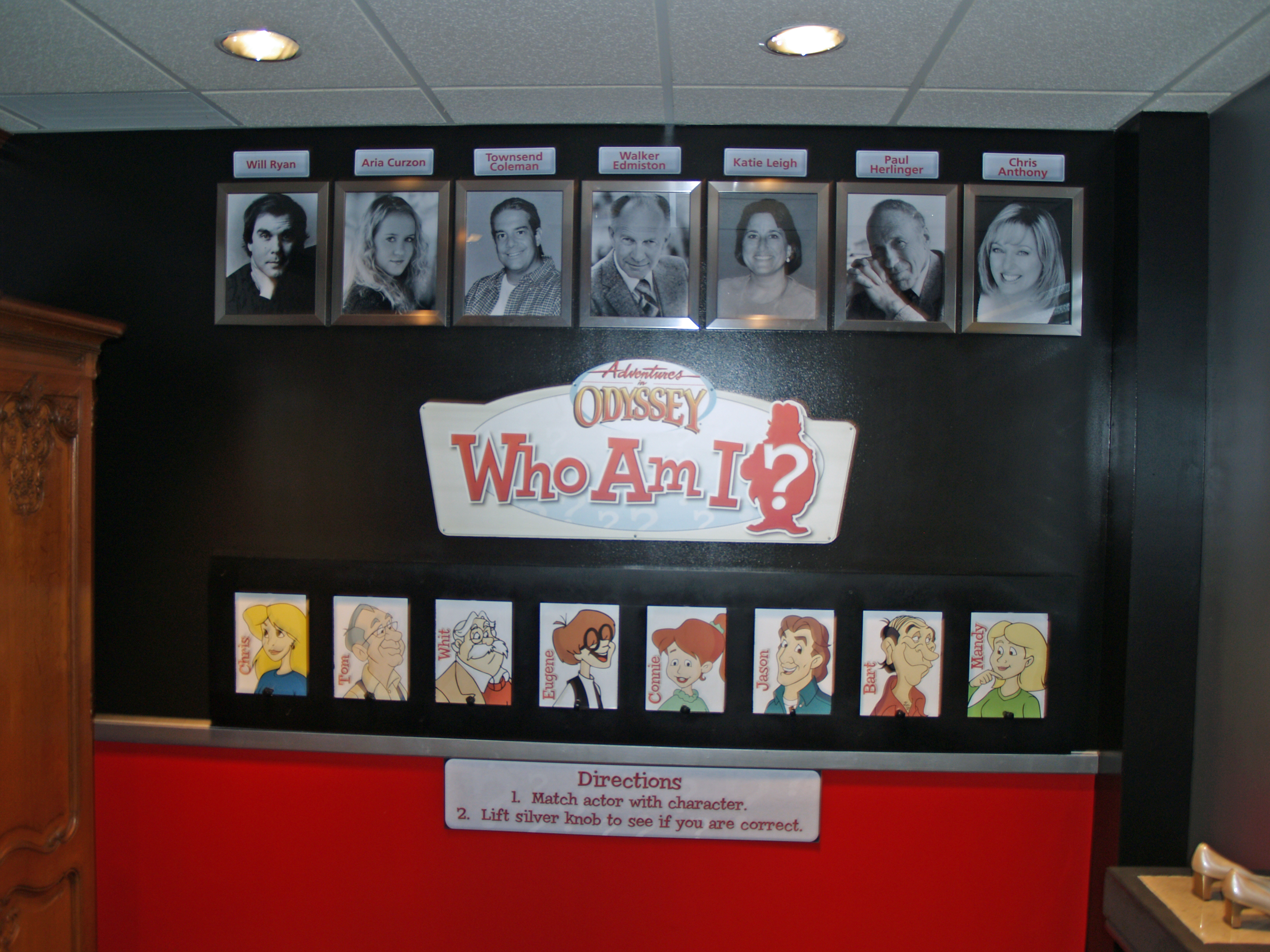
A wall in the real-life Whit's End at the Focus on the Family visitor center showing the Adventures in Odyssey voice actors, challenging viewers to match them with the characters

- John Avery Whittaker, voiced by Hal Smith (1987–1994), Paul Herlinger (1996–2008), Andre Stojka (2009–2026), and Phil Crowley (2026-present)
- Connie Kendall, voiced by Katie Leigh (1987–present)
- Eugene Meltsner and Harlow Doyle, voiced by Will Ryan (1987–2000, 2005–2021)
- Wooton Bassett, voiced by Jess Harnell (2001–present)
- Chris, the show's announcer, voiced by Chris Anthony (1987–present)
- Jason Whittaker, voiced by Townsend Coleman (1994–present)
- Katrina Shanks-Meltsner, voiced by Pamela Hayden (1993–2000), Audrey Wasilewski (2005–present)
- Bernard Walton, voiced by Dave Madden (1990–2008)
- Tom Riley, voiced by Walker Edmiston (1987–2007)
- Jack Allen, voiced by Alan Young (1994–2012)
- Joanne Allen, voiced by Janet Waldo (1996–2012)
- Bart Rathbone, voiced by Walker Edmiston (1987–2007) and Robert Easton (2008)
- Rodney Rathbone, voiced by Steve Burns (1990–2007)
- Dr. Regis Blackgaard, voiced by Earl Boen (1989–1999)
- Edwin Blackgaard, Regis's twin brother, also voiced by Earl Boen (1992–2015)
- Jimmy Barclay, voiced by David Griffin (1988–2008)
- Donna Barclay, voiced by Azure Janosky (1988–1997)
- Lucy Cunningham-Shultz, voiced by Genesis Long (1988–2008)
- Jack Davis, voiced by Donald Long (1988–2008)
- Aubrey Shepherd, voiced by Danielle Judovits (1999–2005)
- Matthew Parker, voiced by Zach Callison (2010–2014), Gunner Sizemore (2014–2015) and Justin Felbinger (2016–2020)
- Emily Jones, voiced by Cristina Pucelli (2010–present)
- David Parker, voiced by Marc Evan Jackson (2010–2018) and Eddie Frierson (2018–present)
- Eva Parker, voiced by Amanda Troop (2010–present)
- Olivia Parker, voiced by Hope Levy (2010) and Kelly Stables (2011–present)
- Camilla Parker, voiced by Sydney Shiotani (2010–2012), Michaela Dean (2012–2017) and Lilly Mae Stewart (2017–2019)
- Barrett Jones, voiced by Andy Pessoa (2010–2014)
- Priscilla Peterson, voiced by Gatlin Green (2010–2012)
- Jay Smouse, voiced by Whit Hertford (2010–present)
- Robert "Mitch" Mitchell, voiced by Steve Burns (2001–2012)
- Penny Wise Bassett, voiced by Kimmy Robertson (2011–present)
- Jules Kendall, voiced by Shona Kennedy Rodman (2013–present)
- Buck Oliver-Meltsner, voiced by Robby Bruce (2011–present)
- Detective Don Polhaus, voiced by Phil Proctor (2011–present)
- Wilson Knox, voiced by Greg Jbara (2017–present)
- Morrie Rydell, voiced by Atticus Shaffer (2016–present)
- Suzu Rydell, voiced by April Hong (2016–present)
- Zoe Grant, voiced by Natalie Lander (2015–present)
- Renee Carter, voiced by Amy Pemberton (2016–2022), Caitlin Thorburn (2023–present)

== Episodes ==
Adventures in Odyssey has aired more than 1000 episodes and has released 80 main albums, as well as many other special collections, including monthly Adventures in Odyssey club only episodes.

== Spin-off products ==
Aside from the radio drama, Adventures in Odyssey has begun many spin-offs and special series, including an official Odyssey podcast, fan-favorite podcast Whit's Up?, 17 animated videos, Eugene Sings! and Eugene Sings! Christmas, and three edutainment computer games.

=== Books ===
Adventures in Odyssey now has over 7 different spin-off book series, Passages, Kidsboro, The Imagination Station, Candid Conversations with Connie, The Blackgaard Chronicles, Jones and Parker Case Files, Young Whit, a 12-book series of novels titled simply Adventures in Odyssey, as well as episode guides, Bibles, devotionals, mysteries, and several comic books.

=== Video series ===
The first Adventures in Odyssey video was released in 1991. This series was created following the success of Focus on the Family's involvement in Tyndale House's video project, McGee and Me!. Originally, the Odyssey video series was created by a separate staff than that of the radio series, and each episode had a budget of about $400,000; by 1998, over two million Odyssey videos had been sold. Currently, 17 episodes are in the video series and several attempts have been made to place this series on television. The episodes were screened in Britain on Channel 4 in the mid-1990s and its upcoming program on Smile of a Child.

It was also broadcast on the Australian Christian Channel in Australia.

=== Feature film ===
On August 3, 2024, at the One Grand Party live show in celebration of the 1000th episode, Focus on the Family president Jim Daly announced an upcoming animated project. On December 4, 2025, Focus announced an upcoming feature film scheduled for fall of 2026 titled Adventures in Odyssey: Journey into the Impossible. The film was developed from an idea by long-time executive producer Dave Arnold, with art direction by ex-Disney animator John Pomeroy. The story was expected to be a prequel to the audio series, following a young Whit and his wife Jenny as they create Whit's End. A new design style for the character art was also announced simultaneously, to ensure the character designs were consistent between the movie and the art for the audio drama and comics. This new art would replace the long-running character designs and art style for the show, established by artist Gary Locke from 2001-2025.

=== Computer games ===
Christian video game developer Digital Praise has released three computer games based on the series, Adventures in Odyssey: The Treasure of the Incas, Adventures in Odyssey: The Sword of the Spirit, and Adventures in Odyssey: The Great Escape. Will Ryan, Katie Leigh, and Paul Herlinger voiced the main characters of the games.

=== The Imagination Station Book Series ===
The Imagination Station Book Series is based on the machine of the same name in the Adventures in Odyssey audio dramas. It takes characters back to see events in history using the power of their own imagination. There are currently 35 installments in the series, along with 11 audiobooks.

=== Eugene Sings! ===
Eugene Sings! and Eugene Sings! Christmas are Adventures in Odyssey musical albums, released by Tyndale House. Both feature songs written and sung by Will Ryan, voicing Eugene Meltsner from the series.

=== Merchandise ===
Since 1987, Adventures in Odyssey has released hundreds of products related to the show, including those listed above as well as apparel, toys, games, calendars, pens, stickers, pins, water bottles, bookmarks, and other collectibles. Some are sold through retail outlets others are promotional items that are given away to certain people or at special events. There is even a display case in the Welcome Center of Focus on the Family in Colorado Springs, Colorado that showcases some of the rarest memorabilia. Many fans of Adventures in Odyssey have become collectors of these products along with the audio albums, books and videos. There have been fan-sponsored contests to showcase these collections. The largest collection consisting of over 2,200 unique items currently resides in Indianapolis, Indiana in the OdysseyFan Museum.

== Events ==
- 1997 Live Show - November 29 - Colorado Springs, CO
- 2002 Live Show - July 26 & 27 - Colorado Springs, CO
- 2008 Live Show - August 15 & 16 - Colorado Springs, CO
- 2012 Live Show - June 16 - Dallas, TX
- 2012 GITS Finale - November 3 - Colorado Springs, CO
- 2017 GITS2 Finale - Colorado Springs, CO
- 2017 Cruise - Nov 15 - Disney Dream
- 2024 One Grand Party - August 2 & 3 - Colorado Springs, CO

== Radio Theatre ==
Radio Theatre is a program run by Focus on the Family that makes both original and adapted radio dramas. Much of the staff involved with Adventures in Odyssey is also involved with Radio Theatre such as Paul McCusker. They have made adaptations of many novels including Les Miserables and Anne of Green Gables, as well as an adaptation of the complete Chronicles of Narnia, hosted by C.S. Lewis' stepson Douglas Gresham.

== See also ==
- The Last Chance Detectives
- Iliad House
