= Paul Herlinger =

American actor and producer

- Born: May 1, 1929; New York City, U.S.
- Died: February 2, 2010 (aged 80); Tacoma, Washington, U.S.
- Education: University of Michigan
- Occupations: Voice actor, radio & TV producer
- Years active: 1945–2008
- Spouse: Ilona Plankin (m. 1956–2010)

Paul Herlinger (May 1, 1929 – February 2, 2010) was an American voice actor, best known for his role as John Avery "Whit" Whittaker on the radio drama, Adventures in Odyssey (1996–2008). He began in that role soon after Hal Smith died in 1994, and he also voiced Whit on the Adventures in Odyssey video series and Adventures in Odyssey video games. In 2008, he retired due to health conditions. Herlinger also did voice work for dozens of PBS documentaries, commercials, and films.

He began his career in radio production via an all-city, three-day-a-week program in 1945 while attending Stuyvesant High School in New York. After two years at New York University, Paul served in the United States Marine Corps. This was followed by his completion of a Master of Arts at the University of Michigan where he met Ilona Planken, whom he married on September 1, 1956. He spent 25 years in commercial television before working for public television, where he was able to produce and narrate documentaries which aired locally and nationally.

Herlinger was a voice actor for Adventures in Odyssey for 12 years. His major role on the show was the voice of John Avery Whittaker from 1996 to 2008. He died on February 2, 2010.

Herlinger also narrated a documentary which aired nationally on public television stations titled As Close As Your Dare-Africa.
