= List of Adventures in Odyssey episodes =

This is a list of all the episodes of Adventures in Odyssey, a Christian radio drama series produced by Focus on the Family. It has aired on the radio since its debut on November 21, 1987, and has been one of the longest-running radio programs still in production. Almost all the episodes, sorted into a series of albums, have been available, originally on cassette tape, but also on CD, digital download, and through Focus on the Family's online subscription service, the Adventures in Odyssey Club.

== Series overview ==
Season	Episodes	Originally released	
Season	Episodes	First released	Last released
1	6	November 21, 1987	December 26, 1987
2	49	January 2, 1988	December 31, 1988
3	44	January 7, 1989	December 30, 1989
4	39	January 20, 1990	December 29, 1990
5	40	January 5, 1991	December 28, 1991
6	38	January 4, 1992	December 26, 1992
7	37	January 2, 1993	December 18, 1993
8	42	January 8, 1994	December 31, 1994
9	44	January 7, 1995	December 2, 1995
10	32	January 6, 1996	December 21, 1996
11	15	September 6, 1997	December 20, 1997
12	31	January 3, 1998	November 28, 1998
13	19	March 6, 1999	December 25, 1999
14	23	March 4, 2000	December 16, 2000
15	21	February 3, 2001	December 22, 2001
16	22	January 5, 2002	November 30, 2002
17	32	January 11, 2003	November 22, 2003
18	23	January 11, 2004	December 11, 2004
19	25	January 15, 2005	December 17, 2005
20	25	January 28, 2006	December 23, 2006
21	23	February 3, 2007	December 15, 2007
22	24	March 1, 2008	June 7, 2008
23	9	September 19, 2009	November 14, 2009
24	24	March 6, 2010	December 18, 2010
25	24	March 12, 2011	December 17, 2011
26	24	March 3, 2012	December 22, 2012
27	12	August 10, 2013	October 26, 2013
28	26	January 1, 2014	December 6, 2014
29	18	January 1, 2015	December 1, 2015
30	24	January 1, 2016	December 3, 2016
31	25	January 1, 2017	December 1, 2017
32	24	January 1, 2018	December 1, 2018
33	24	January 1, 2019	December 1, 2019
34	24	January 1, 2020	December 1, 2020
35	26	January 1, 2021	December 1, 2021
36	22	January 1, 2022	December 1, 2022
37	24	January 1, 2023	December 1, 2023
38	24	January 1, 2024	December 1, 2024
39	24	January 1, 2025	December 1, 2025
40	31	January 15, 2026	December 31, 2026

== Episodes ==
=== Season 1 (1987) ===
Episodes 1-19 were originally aired under the name "Odyssey USA".

No. overall	No. in season	Title	Directed by	Written by	Original release date
1	1	"Whit's Flop"	Steve Harris; Phil Lollar	Steve Harris; Phil Lollar	November 21, 1987
Note: The series debuted as Odyssey USA.
2	2	"The Life of the Party"	Steve Harris; Phil Lollar	Paul McCusker	November 28, 1987
3	3	"Lights Out at Whit's End"	Steve Harris; Phil Lollar	Steve Harris; Phil Lollar	December 5, 1987
4	4	"Connie Comes to Town"	Steve Harris; Phil Lollar	Steve Harris; Phil Lollar	December 12, 1987
5	5	"Gifts for Madge and Guy"	Steve Harris; Phil Lollar	Steve Harris; Phil Lollar	December 19, 1987
6	6	"The Day After Christmas"	Steve Harris; Phil Lollar	Paul McCusker	December 26, 1987

=== Season 2 (1988) ===
- 7: "Promises, Promises"
- 8: "Dental Dilemma"
- 9: "Doing Unto Others"
- 10: "Nothing to Fear"
- 11: "Addictions Can Be Habit-Forming"
- 12: "The Tangled Web
- 13: "Bobby's Valentine"
- 14: "Missed It By That Much"
- 15: "My Brother's Keeper"
- 16: "No Stupid Questions"
- 17: "A Member of the Family, Part 1"
- 18: "A Member of the Family, Part 2"
- 19: "Recollections"

Episode 19, Recollections, was the last episode of the series being known as Odyssey USA. For Episodes 20–22, the series was known simply as Odyssey before changing to its permanent title, Adventures in Odyssey, beginning with Episode 23.

- 20: "Mike Makes Right"
- 21: "The Case of the Missing Train Car"
- 22: "A Simple Addition"
- 23: "The Quality of Mercy"
- 24: "Gotcha!"
- 25: "Harley Takes the Case, Part 1"
- 26: "Harley Takes the Case, Part 2"
- 27: "A Change of Hart"
- 28: "The Price of Freedom"
- 29: "Rumor Has It"
- 30: "Honor Thy Parents"
- 31: "Family Vacation, Part 1"
- 32: "Family Vacation, Part 2"
- 33: "The Day Independence Came"
- 34: "Stormy Weather"
- 35: "V.B.S. Blues"
- 36: "Kids' Radio"
- 37: "Camp What-A-Nut, Part 1"
- 38: "Camp What-A-Nut, Part 2"
- 39: "The Case of the Secret Room, Part 1"
- 40: "The Case of the Secret Room, Part 2"
- 41: "Return to the Bible Room"
- 42: "The Last Great Adventure of the Summer"
- 43: "Back to School"
- 44: "It Sure Seems Like It to Me"
- 45: "What Are We Gonna Do About Halloween?"
- 46: "The Shepherd and the Giant"
- 47: "A Single Vote"
- 48: "Heroes"
- 49: "Thank You, God"
- 50: "Karen"
- 51: "Connie, Part 1"
- 52: "Connie, Part 2"
- 53: "The Sacred Trust"
- 54: "Peace on Earth"
- 55: "Auld Lang Syne"

=== Season 3 (1989) ===
- 56: "By Faith, Noah"
- 57: "The Prodigal, Jimmy"
- 58: "A Matter of Obedience"
- 59: "A Worker Approved"
- 60: "And When You Pray..."
- 61: "The Boy Who Didn't Go to Church"
- 62: "Let This Mind Be in You"
- 63: "A Good and Faithful Servant"
- 64: "The Greatest of These"
- 65: "Bad Company"
- 66: "The Imagination Station, Part 1"
- 67: "The Imagination Station, Part 2"
- 68: "Choices"
- 69: "Go Ye Therefore"
- 70: "The Return of Harley, Part 1"
- 71: "The Return of Harley, Part 2"
- 72: "An Encounter with Mrs. Hooper"
- 73: "A Bite of Applesauce"
- 74: "Connie Goes to Camp, Part 1"
- 75: "Connie Goes to Camp, Part 2"
- 76: "Eugene's Dilemma"
- 77: "The Nemesis, Part 1"
- 78: "The Nemesis, Part 2"
- 79: "Our Best Vacation Ever"
- 80: "A Prisoner for Christ"
- 81: "Good Business"
- 82: "Heatwave"
- 83: "The Battle, Part 1"
- 84: "The Battle, Part 2"
- 85: "You Go to School Where?"
- 86: "Isaac the Insecure"
- 87: "Elijah, Part 1"
- 88: "Elijah, Part 2"
- 89: "That's Not Fair"
- 90: "But, You Promised"
- 91: "A Mission for Jimmy"
- 92: "The Ill-Gotten Deed"
- 93: "Rescue from Manatugo Point"
- 94: "Operation: Dig-Out"
- 95: "The Very Best of Friends"
- 96: "The Reluctant Rival"
- 97: "Monty's Christmas"
- 98: "The Visitors"
- 99: "The Barclay Family Ski Vacation"

=== Season 4 (1990) ===
- 100: "Ice Fishing"
- 101: "Scattered Seeds"
- 102: "The Treasure of LeMonde!"
- 103: "Front Page News"
- 104: "Lincoln, Part 1"
- 105: "Lincoln, Part 2"
- 106: "By Any Other Name"
- 107: "Bad Luck"
- 108: "Isaac the Courageous"
- 109: "Two Sides to Every Story"
- 110: "A...is for Attitude"
- 111: "First Love"
- 112: "Curious, Isn't It?"
- 113: "Suspicious Minds"
- 114: "The Big Broadcast"
- 115: "An Act of Mercy" (Remake of Episode #23, "The Quality of Mercy")
- 116: "Isaac the Benevolent" (Remake of Episode #9, "Doing Unto Others")
- 117: "The Trouble with Girls" (Remake of Episode #13, "Bobby's Valentine")
- 118: "What Happened to the Silver Streak?" (Remake of Episode #21, "The Case of the Missing Train Car")
- 119: "Better Late Than Never" (Remake of Episode #14, "Missed It By That Much")
- 120: "Pranks for the Memories"
- 121: "Missing Person (Remake of Episodes #25 and #26, "Harley Takes the Case, Parts 1 and 2")
- 122: "Castles and Cauldrons, Part 1"
- 123: "Castles and Cauldrons, Part 2"
- 124: "The Winning Edge"
- 125: "All's Well with Boswell"
- 126: "Wishful Thinking"
- 127: "Have You No Selpurcs?"
- 128: "One Bad Apple"
- 129: "Not One of Us"
- 130: "Bernard and Joseph, Part 1"
- 131: "Bernard and Joseph, Part 2"
- 132: "Thanksgiving at Home"
- 133: "Cousin Albert"
- 134: "Pamela Has a Problem"
- 135: "Back to Bethlehem, Part 1"
- 136: "Back to Bethlehem, Part 2"
- 137: "Back to Bethlehem, Part 3"
- 138: "The Adventure of the Adventure"

=== Season 5 (1991) ===
- 139: "Melanie's Diary"
- 140: "The Vow"
- 141: "Over the Airwaves"
- 142: "Train Ride"
- 143: "Muckraker"
- 144: "Someone to Watch Over Me"
- 145: "The Second Coming"
- 146: "Emotional Baggage"
- 147: "Where There's a Will"
- 148: "Isaac the Procrastinator"
- 149: "By Dawn's Early Light"
- 150: "Home is Where the Hurt Is"
- 151: "The Last Shall Be First"
- 152: "The Meaning of Sacrifice"
- 153: "Mayor for a Day"
- 154: "Coming of Age"
- 155: "Waylaid in the Windy City, Part 1"
- 156: "Waylaid in the Windy City, Part 2"
- 157: "Last in a Long Line"
- 158: "A Day in the Life"
- 159: "The Homecoming"
- 160: "A Rathbone of Contention"
- 161: "Isaac the True Friend"
- 162: "Peacemaker"
- 163: "A Model Child"
- 164: "Sixties-Something"
- 165: "Bernard and Esther, Part 1"
- 166: "Bernard and Esther, Part 2"
- 167: "Dobson Comes to Town"
- 168: "The Curse"
- 169: "Hold Up!"
- 170: "A Test for Robyn"
- 171: "The Cross of Cortes, Part 1"
- 172: "The Cross of Cortes, Part 2"
- 173: "A Thanksgiving Carol"
- 174: "Where's Your Daddy?"
- 175: "East Winds, Raining"
- 176: "The Star, Part 1"
- 177: "The Star, Part 2"
- 178: "Room Mates"

=== Season 6 (1992) ===
- 179: "You Gotta Be Wise"
- 180: "Isaac the Pure"
- 181: "It Takes Integrity"
- 182: "The Scales of Justice"
- 183: "Tales of Moderation"
- 184: "Isaac the Chivalrous"
- 185: "A Question of Loyalty"
- 186: "The Conscientious Cross-Guard"
- 187: "An Act of Nobility"
- 188: "The Courage to Stand"
- 189: "No, Honestly!"
- 190: "Moses, the Passover, Part 1"
- 191: "Moses, the Passover, Part 2"
- 192: "Modesty is the Best Policy"
- 193: "A Tongue of Fire"
- 194: "A License to Drive"
- 195: "Father's Day"
- 196: "Harlow Doyle, Private Eye"
- 197: "The Midnight Ride"
- 198: "Treasure Hunt"
- 199: "The 'No' Factor
- 200: "Feud for Thought:
- 201: "Fair-Weather Fans"
- 202: "Timmy's Cabin"
- 203: "Double Trouble"
- 204: "Wonderworld"
- 205: "Flash Flood"
- 206: "Pen Pal"
- 207: "The Case of the Candid Camera"
- 208: "Pipe Dreams"
- 209: "Columbus: The Grand Voyage"
- 210: "On Solid Ground"
- 211: "The Mortal Coil, Part 1"
- 212: "The Mortal Coil, Part 2"
- 213: "Best Intentions"
- 214: "The Living Nativity"
- 215: "Caroling, Caroling"
- 216: "Like Father, Like Son

=== Season 7 (1993) ===
- 217: "Rights, Wrongs, and Reasons"
- 218: "A Class Act"
- 219: "Treasures of the Heart"
- 220: "This is Chad Pearson?"
- 221: "It is Well"
- 222: "The Jesus Cloth"
- 223: "Real Time"
- 224: "Greater Love"
- 225: "Count it All Joy"
- 226: "An Adventure in Bethany, Part 1"
- 227: "An Adventure in Bethany, Part 2"
- 228: "A Game of Compassion"
- 229: "The Marriage Feast"
- 230: "Our Father"
- 231: "Hallowed Be Thy Name"
- 232: "Thy Kingdom Come"
- 233: "Thy Will Be Done"
- 234: "Our Daily Bread"
- 235: "Forgive Us as We Forgive"
- 236: "Into Temptation"
- 237: "Deliver Us from Evil"
- 238: "For Thine is the Kingdom"
- 239: "The Power"
- 240: "And the Glory"
- 241: "Forever...Amen"
- 242: "Hymn Writers"
- 243: "Family Values"
- 244: "The Mysterious Stranger, Part 1"
- 245: "The Mysterious Stranger, Part 2"
- 246: "My Fair Bernard"
- 247: "Why Don't You Grow Up?
- 248: "Terror from the Skies"
- 249: "The Case of the Delinquent Disciples"
- 250: "Pilgrim's Progress Revisited, Part 1"
- 251: "Pilgrim's Progress Revisited, Part 2"
- 252: "The Bad Hair Day"
- 253: "A Time for Christmas"

=== Season 8 (1994) ===
- 254: "Truth, Trivia, and 'Trina"
- 255: "The Boy Who Cried 'Destructo'! (Remake of Episodes #70 & 71, "The Return of Harley, Parts 1 and 2"
- 256: "Aloha, Oy!, Part 1"
- 257: "Aloha, Oy!, Part 2"
- 258: "Aloha, Oy!, Part 3"
- 259: "The Potential in Elliot"
- 260: "Naturally, I Assumed"
- 261: "Afraid, Not!"
- 262: "A Prayer for George Barclay"
- 263: "When Bad Isn't So Good"
- 264: "Making the Grade"
- 265: "War of the Words"
- 266: "It Began with a Rabbit's Foot"
- 267: "It Ended with a Handshake"
- 268: "Pet Peeves"
- 269: "Fences"
- 270: "The War Hero"
- 271: "The Secret Keys of Discipline"
- 272: "Two Brothers and Bernard, Part 1"
- 273: "Two Brothers and Bernard, Part 2"
- 274: "First-Hand Experience"
- 275: "Second Thoughts"
- 276: "Third Degree"
- 277: "It Happened at Four Corners"
- 278: "The Fifth House on the Left, Part 1"
- 279: "The Fifth House on the Left, Part 2"
- 280: "Gone..."
- 281: "...But Not Forgotten"
- 282: "The Fundamentals"
- 283: "A Book by Its Cover"
- 284: "The Election Deception"
- 285: "George Under Pressure"
- 286: "Tom for Mayor, Part 1"
- 287: "Tom for Mayor, Part 2"
- 288: "The Twilife Zone"
- 289: "A Call for Reverend Jimmy"
- 290: "A Name, Not a Number, Part 1"
- 291: "A Name, Not a Number, Part 2"
- 292: "Siege at Jericho"
- 293: "A Code of Honor"
- 294: "Unto Us a Child is Born"
- 295: "Soaplessly Devoted"

=== Season 9 (1995) ===
- 296: "Red Wagons and Pink Flamingos"
- 297: "Blackbeard's Treasure"
- 298: "I Want My B-TV!"
- 299: "The Truth About Zachary"
- 300: "Preacher's Kid"
- 301: "The Good, the Bad, and Butch"
- 302: "Share and Share Alike"
- 303: "All the Difference in the World"
- 304: "Saint Paul: The Man from Tarsus"
- 305: "Saint Paul: Set Apart by God"
- 306: "A Victim of Circumstance"
- 307: "Poetry in Slow Motion"
- 308: "Subject Yourself"
- 309: "The Perfect Witness, Part 1"
- 310: "The Perfect Witness, Part 2"
- 311: "The Perfect Witness, Part 3"
- 312: "Rewards in Full"
- 313: "Top This!"
- 314: "The Underground Railroad, Part 1"
- 315: "The Underground Railroad, Part 2"
- 316: "The Underground Railroad, Part 3"
- 317: "B-TV: Envy"
- 318: "A Touch of Healing, Part 1"
- 319: "A Touch of Healing, Part 2"
- 320: "Where is Thy Sting?"
- 321: "Hidden in My Heart"
- 322: "The Turning Point"
- 323: "A Little Credit, Please"
- 324: "Small Fires, Little Pools"
- 325: "Angels Unaware"
- 326: "Gathering Thunder"
- 327: "Moving Targets"
- 328: "Hard Losses"
- 329: "The Return"
- 330: "The Time Has Come"
- 331: "Checkmate"
- 332: "Another Chance"
- 333: "The Last Resort"
- 334: "The Final Conflict"
- 335: "Love is in the Air, Part 1"
- 336: "Love is in the Air, Part 2"
- 337: "W-O-R-R-Y"
- 338: "Easy Money"
- 339: "Do, for a Change"

=== Season 10 (1996) ===
- 340: "Pokenberry Falls, R.F.D., Part 1"
- 341: "Pokenberry Falls, R.F.D., Part 2"
- 342: "Welcome Home, Mr. Blackgaard"
- 343: "The Pretty Good Samaritan"
- 344: "Letting Go"
- 345: "B-TV: Compassion"
- 346: "Saint Paul: Voyage to Rome"
- 347: "Saint Paul: An Appointment with Caesar"
- 348: "With a Little Help from My Friends"
- 349: "Blessings in Disguise"
- 350: "The Time of Our Lives"
- 351: "What Are You Gonna Do with Your Life?
- 352: "Memories of Jerry"
- 353: "A Question About Tasha"
- 354: "Blind Justice"
- 355: "The Search for Whit, Part 1"
- 356: "The Search for Whit, Part 2"
- 357: "The Search for Whit, Part 3"
- 358: "The Secret Weapon"
- 359: "The Merchant of Odyssey"
- 360: "Three Funerals and a Wedding, Part 1"
- 361: "Three Funerals and a Wedding, Part 2"
- 362: "The Right Choice, Part 1"
- 363: "The Right Choice, Part 2"
- 364: "Home, Sweet Home"
- 365: "Clara"
- 366: "Solitary Refinement"
- 367: "The Decision"
- 368: "The Other Woman"
- 369: "It's a Wrap!"
- 370: "Christmas Around the World, Part 1"
- 371: "Christmas Around the World, Part 2"

At the end of the 1996 season, the AIO team took a nine-month break, with no new episodes until September 1997. According to the "Adventures in Odyssey HQ" website, "the hiatus" means the time from December 1996 to September 1997 where no episodes were produced. The writers, producers, actors, and production engineers needed a break from the daily pressure of the program and after ten years of production decided it was time. Many things have changed from "old Odyssey" before the hiatus to "new Odyssey" after the hiatus. None of the children (unless you count Rodney Rathbone) from old Odyssey have been carried over to new Odyssey. Nearly all of the storylines from old Odyssey were finished off in the final album of that era (Welcome Home) and the show has in general had a different "flavor" than before."

=== Season 11 (1997) ===
- 372: "For Whom the Wedding Bells Toll, Part 1"
- 373: "For Whom the Wedding Bells Toll, Part 2"
- 374: "For Whom the Wedding Bells Toll, Part 3"
- 375: "The Pushover"
- 376: "Chores No More"
- 377: "Just Say Yes"
- 378: "The Painting"
- 379: "Best Face Forward"
- 380: "The One About Trust, Part 1"
- 381: "The One About Trust, Part 2"
- 382: "Viva La Difference"
- 383: "B-TV: Thanks"
- 384: "Amazing Grace"
- 385: "It's a Pokenberry Christmas, Part 1"
- 386: "It's a Pokenberry Christmas, Part 2"

=== Season 12 (1998) ===
- 387: "New Year's Eve Live!" (This episode was recorded before a live audience at Focus on the Family Headquarters.)
- 388: "Leap of Faith"
- 389: "O.T. Action News: Jephthah's Vow"
- 390: "No Bones About It"
- 391: "The Joke's on You"
- 392: "When in Doubt...Pray!"
- 393: "Wrapped Around Your Finger"
- 394: "Saint Patrick: A Heart Afire, Part 1"
- 395: "Saint Patrick: A Heart Afire, Part 2"
- 396: "Poor Loser"
- 397: "Tornado!"
- 398: "A Case of Revenge"
- 399: "Bernard and Job"
- 400: "The Spy Who Bugged Me"
- 401: "More Like Alicia"
- 402: "Arizona Sunrise"
- 403: "Faster Than a Speeding Ticket"
- 404: "Hide and Seek"
- 405: "The Graduate"
- 406: "Malachi's Message, Part 1"
- 407: "Malachi's Message, Part 2"
- 408: "Malachi's Message, Part 3"
- 409: "Natural Born Leader"
- 410: "B-TV: Forgiveness"
- 411: "In All Things Give Thanks"
- 412: "A Lesson from Mike"
- 413: "The Devil Made Me Do It"
- 414: "Buried Sin"
- 415: "Gloobers!"
- 416: "The Tower"
- 417: "Not-So-Trivial Pursuits"

=== Season 13 (1999) ===
During this season, the series began experimenting with a "split-episode" format for some episodes. The concept was not particularly popular and the format was ultimately discontinued during the 2000 season.

- 418: "Opening Day"
- 419: "Another Man's Shoes"
- 420: "Telemachus, Part 1"
- 421: "Telemachus, Part 2"
- 422: "Passages: Fletcher's Rebellion, Part 1"
- 423: "Passages: Fletcher's Rebellion, Part 2"
- 424: "Blackgaard's Revenge, Part 1"
- 425: "Blackgaard's Revenge, Part 2"
- 426: "The Buck Starts Here"
- 427: "Something Cliqued Between Us"
- 428a: "The Eternal Birthday"
- 428b: "Bethany's Imaginary Friend"
- 429: "The Y.A.K. Problem"
- 430: "Blind Girl's Bluff"
- 431a: "Where There's Smoke"
- 431b: "The Virtual Kid"
- 432: "You Win Some, You Lose Some"
- 433a: "The Treasure Room"
- 433b: "Chain Reaction"
- 434: "B-TV: Redeeming the Season"
- 435: "A Look Back, Part 1"
- 436: "A Look Back, Part 2"

=== Season 14 (2000) ===
- 437a: "Sunset Bowlawater"
- 437b: "The Long Way Home"
- 438a: "The Lyin' Tale"
- 438b: "The Telltale Cat" (This episode was pulled from release and distribution after its initial airing due to a scene where a cat is thrown into a lake being deemed to be too violent.)
- 439: "B-TV: Grace" (This episode was pulled from release and distribution after its initial airing due to criticism received that the episode was offensive to the Amish.)
- 440: "I Slap Floor"
- 441a: "What Do You Think?"
- 441b: "Idol Minds"
- 442a: "Two Roads"
- 442b: "Sticks and Stones" (This episode was pulled from release and distribution after its initial airing due to concerns from the producers that the episode would give young listeners a new arsenal of insults to call their classmates.)
- 443: "Changing Rodney"
- 444a: "Career Moves"
- 444b: "The Bad Guy"
- 444c: "Bethany's Flood"
- 445: "No Boundaries"
- 446a: "A Matter of Manners"
- 446b: "The Seven Deadly Dwarves"
- 447: "Potlucks and Poetry"
- 448: "Mandy's Debut"
- 449: "The Big Deal, Part 1"
- 450: "The Big Deal, Part 2"
- 451: "Life Trials of the Rich and Famous"
- 452: "Missionary Impossible"
- 453: "The Great Wishy Woz, Part 1"
- 454: "The Great Wishy Woz, Part 2"
- 455: "Best Laid Plans"
- 456: "Worst Day Ever"
- 457: "Opportunity Knocks"
- 458: "Red Herring"
- 459: "Slumber Party"

=== Season 15 (2001) ===
- 460: "Nova Rising"
- 461: "B-TV: Obedience"
- 462: "The W.E."
- 463: "Green Eyes and Yellow Tulips"
- 464: "The Triangle, Part 1"
- 465: "The Triangle, Part 2"
- 466: "Snow Day"
- 467: "Broken Window"
- 468: "Chains, Part 1"
- 469: "Chains, Part 2"
- 470: "Break a Leg"
- 471: "Fifteen Minutes"
- 472: "Welcoming Wooton"
- 473: "Breaking Point"
- 474: "Shining Armor, Part 1"
- 475: "Shining Armor, Part 2"
- 476: "Relatively Annoying"
- 477: "O.T. Action News: Battle at the Kishon"
- 478: "Strange Boy in a Strange Land"
- 479: "Happy Smilers"
- 480: "The Popsicle Kid"

=== Season 16 (2002) ===
- 481: "Grand Opening, Part 1"
- 482: "Grand Opening, Part 2"
- 483: "Secrets"
- 484: "Plan B, Part 1: Missing in Action"
- 485: "Plan B, Part 2: Collision Course"
- 486: "Plan B, Part 3: Cross-Fire"
- 487: "Plan B, Part 4: Resistance"
- 488: "Under the Influence, Part 1"
- 489: "Under the Influence, Part 2"
- 490: "The Black Veil, Part 1"
- 491: "The Black Veil, Part 2"
- 492: "Twisting Pathway"
- 493: "Sheep's Clothing"
- 494: "Box of Miracles"
- 495: "The Unraveling"
- 496: "Exceptional Circumstances"
- 497: "Expect the Worst"
- 498: "Exactly As Planned"
- 499: "Exit"
- 500: "500"
- 501: "Inside the Studio"
- 502: "Live at the 25"

=== Season 17 (2003) ===
- 503: "Between You and Me"
- 504: "Aubrey's Bathrobe"
- 505: "The Toy Man"
- 506: "For Trying Out Loud"
- 507: "The Benefit of the Doubt"
- 508: "The American Revelation, Part 1"
- 509: "The American Revelation, Part 2"
- 510: "For the Fun of It"
- 511: "The Pact, Part 1"
- 512: "The Pact, Part 2"
- 513: "Do or Diet"
- 514: "Room Enough for Two"
- 515: "B-TV: Behind the Scenes"
- 516: "Bassett Hounds"
- 517: "It's All About Me"
- 518: "The Case of the Disappearing Hortons"
- 519: "The Defining Moment"
- 520: "The Mystery at Tin Flat"
- 521: "Hindsight"
- 522: "All Things to All People"
- 523: "Here Today, Gone Tomorrow?, Part 1"
- 524: "Here Today, Gone Tomorrow?, Part 2"
- 525: "Here Today, Gone Tomorrow?, Part 3"
- 526: "Seeing Red"
- 527: "Black Clouds"
- 528: "The Taming of the Two"
- 529: "The Mailman Cometh"
- 530: "Silver Lining"
- 531: "Teacher's Pest"
- 532: "Pink is Not My Color"
- 533: "Something Blue, Part 1"
- 534: "Something Blue, Part 2"

=== Season 18 (2004) ===
- 535: "Living in the Gray, Part 1"
- 536: "Living in the Gray, Part 2"
- 537: "My Girl Hallie" (This episode has an alternate ending. The producers posted both endings online for a fans' vote, with the winner making it into the finished show.)
- 538: "Stubborn Streaks"
- 539: "Called on in Class"
- 540: "The Girl in the Sink"
- 541: "Bernard and Saul"
- 542: "Eggshells"
- 543: "Nothing But the Half Truth"
- 544: "Split Ends"
- 545: "Something's Got to Change"
- 546: "No Way Out (Part 1)"
- 547: "No Way In (Part 2)"
- 548: "Sounds Like a Mystery
- 549: "Think On These Things"
- 550: "Fairy Tal-e-vision"
- 551: "Stars in Our Eyes"
- 552: "Sunday Morning Scramble"
- 553: "Potential Possibilities"
- 554: "Call Me If You Care"
- 555: "True Calling"
- 556: "And That's the Truth"
- 557: "A Lamb's Tale"

=== Season 19 (2005) ===
- 558: "A Glass Darkly"
- 559: "The Coolest Dog"
- 560: "The Present Long Ago"
- 561: "Lost by a Nose"
- 562: "The Last 'I Do'
- 563: "Tuesdays with Wooton"
- 564: "A Most Intriguing Question"
- 565: "A Most Surprising Answer"
- 566: "A Most Extraordinary Conclusion"
- 567: "Two Friends and a Truck"
- 568: "The Power of One"
- 569: "The Invisible Dog"
- 570: "For Better or for Worse, Part 1"
- 571: "For Better or for Worse, Part 2"
- 572: "Odyssey Sings!"
- 573: "Back to Abnormal"
- 574: "Prisoners of Fear, Part 1"
- 575: "Prisoners of Fear, Part 2"
- 576: "Prisoners of Fear, Part 3"
- 577: "The Business of Busyness"
- 578: "All-Star Witness"
- 579: "Always"
- 580: "Tales of a Small-Town Thug"
- 581: "A Christmas Conundrum"
- 582: "Silent Night"

=== Season 20 (2006) ===
- 583: "The Champ of the Camp"
- 584: "Dead Ends"
- 585: "The Poor Rich Guy"
- 586: "A Cheater Cheated"
- 587: "Bringing Up Dads"
- 588: "Broken-Armed and Dangerous"
- 589: "The Impossible"
- 590: "Three O'Clock Call"
- 591: "Switch"
- 592: "Now More Than Ever"
- 593: "Around the Block"
- 594: "A Time For Action, Part 1"
- 595: "A Time For Action, Part 2"
- 596: "Cover of Darkness"
- 597: "Out of Our Hands"
- 598: "My Favorite Thing"
- 599: "Blood, Sweat, and Fears"
- 600: "The Nudge"
- 601: "Bernard and Jeremiah"
- 602: "Mum's the Word"
- 603: "The Family Next Door"
- 604: "Like Father, Like Wooton"
- 605: "The Chosen One, Part 1"
- 606: "The Chosen One, Part 2"
- 607: "The Undeniable Truth"

=== Season 21 (2007) ===
- 608: "Run-of-the-Mill Miracle"
- 609: "Prequels of Love"
- 610: "Hear Me, Hear Me"
- 611: "The Top Floor, Part 1"
- 612: "The Top Floor, Part 2"
- 613: "The Top Floor, Part 3"
- 614: "Best of Enemies"
- 615: "Only By His Grace"
- 616: "The Other Side of the Glass, Part 1"
- 617: "The Other Side of the Glass, Part 2"
- 618: "The Other Side of the Glass, Part 3"
- 619: "A New Era, Part 1"
- 620: "A New Era, Part 2"
- 621: "A New Era, Part 3"
- 622: "B-TV: Temptation"
- 623: "Buddy Guard"
- 624: "Wooing Wooton"
- 625: "Something Significant"
- 626: "Life, In the Third Person, Part 1"
- 627: "Life, In the Third Person, Part 2"
- 628: "The Highest Stakes, Part 1"
- 629: "The Highest Stakes, Part 2"
- 630: "Chip Off the Shoulder"

=== Season 22 (2008) ===
Note: Episodes 631 through 642 are part of Album 50, The Best Small Town. To celebrate the 50th album as well as the 20th anniversary of the show, the title of each episode in Album 50 references a past Odyssey episode title.

- 631: "A Capsule Comes to Town" (Episode title references episode 4, "Connie Comes to Town")
- 632: "Suspicious Finds" (Episode title references episode 113, "Suspicious Minds")
- 633: "License to Deprive" (Episode title references episode 194, "A License to Drive")
- 634: "Accidental Dilemma, Part 1" (Episode title references episode 8, "Dental Dilemma")
- 635: "Accidental Dilemma, Part 2" (Episode title references episode 8, "Dental Dilemma")
- 636: "A Class Reenactment" (Episode title references episode 218, "A Class Act")
- 637: "The Forgotten Deed" (Episode title references episode 92, "The Ill-Gotten Deed")
- 638: "The Triangled Web, Part 1" (Episode title references episode 12, "The Tangled Web")
- 639: "The Triangled Web, Part 2" (Episode title references episode 12, "The Tangled Web")
- 640: "Rights, Wrongs, and Winners" (Episode title references episode 217, "Rights, Wrongs, and Reasons")
- 641: "The Imagination Station, Revisited, Part 1" (Episode title references episodes 66 & 67, "The Imagination Station")
- 642: "The Imagination Station, Revisited, Part 2" (Episode title references episodes 66 & 67, "The Imagination Station")
- 643: "Kidsboro, Part 1"
- 644: "Kidsboro, Part 2"
- 645: "Kidsboro, Part 3"

Note': Episodes TC1 through TC8 are part of the special collection The Truth Chronicles which is not part of the show's continuity despite featuring main characters from the rest of the series and has never aired on the radio.

- TC1: "Here Am I"
- TC2: "The Truth Be Told"
- TC3: "The Science Club"
- TC4: "Three in One"
- TC5: "In My Image"
- TC6: "Stepping Stones, Part 1"
- TC7: "Stepping Stones, Part 2"
- TC8: "The Final Call
- ???: "B-TV: Live! (This episode was recorded before a live audience at Focus on the Family Headquarters to celebrate the 20th anniversary of the program.)

Following the airing of episode 645, Kidsboro, Part 3, the Odyssey team put the series on hiatus for nearly two years, not releasing any new episodes except for the spinoff Truth Chronicles and Passages: Darien's Rise episodes until March 2010. All of the major ongoing storylines from the past several years had been resolved during the 2007 and 2008 seasons, so it was a natural time for the team to take a break. Also, several major actors had passed away, most notably Walker Edmiston; and Paul Herlinger retired as the voice of Whit. Other actors left the program for new projects, requiring the team to search for a new wave of voice actors for the program. Beginning with the 2010 season, the program underwent a soft reboot with many new characters, though many of the major characters from past albums such as Whit, Connie, and Eugene continued on.

=== Season 23 (2009) ===
- 646: "Passages: Darien's Rise, Part 1"
- 647: "Passages: Darien's Rise, Part 2"
- 648: "Passages: Darien's Rise, Part 3"
- 649: "Passages: Darien's Rise, Part 4"
- 650: "Passages: Darien's Rise, Part 5"
- 651: "Passages: Darien's Rise, Part 6"
- 652: "Passages: Darien's Rise, Part 7"
- 653: "Passages: Darien's Rise, Part 8"
- 654: "Passages: Darien's Rise, Part 9"

=== Season 24 (2010) ===
- 655: "The Inspiration Station, Part 1"
- 656: "The Inspiration Station, Part 2"
- 657: "Clutter"
- 658: "Game for a Mystery"
- 659: "Target of the Week"
- 660: "For the Birds"
- 661: "When You're Right, You're Right"
- 662: "Grandma's Visit"
- 663: "Finish What You..."
- 664: "The Jubilee Singers, Part 1"
- 665: "The Jubilee Singers, Part 2"
- 666: "The Jubilee Singers, Part 3"
- 667: "The Mystery of the Clock Tower, Part 1"
- 668: "The Mystery of the Clock Tower, Part 2"
- 669: "Wooton's Broken Pencil Show"
- 670: "Stage Fright"
- 671: "Fast As I Can"
- 672: "Opposite Day"
- 673: "The Owlnapping"
- 674: "Square One"
- 675: "A Thankstaking Story"
- 676: "An Agreeable Nanny"
- 677: "The Malted Milkball Falcon"
- 678: "Grandma's Christmas Visit"

=== Season 25 (2011) ===
- 679: "The Green Ring Conspiracy, Part 1"
- 680: "The Green Ring Conspiracy, Part 2"
- 681: "The Green Ring Conspiracy, Part 3"
- 682: "The Green Ring Conspiracy, Part 4"
- 683: "The Green Ring Conspiracy, Part 5"
- 684: "The Green Ring Conspiracy, Part 6"
- 685: "The Green Ring Conspiracy, Part 7"
- 686: "The Green Ring Conspiracy, Part 8"
- 687: "The Green Ring Conspiracy, Part 9"
- 688: "The Green Ring Conspiracy, Part 10"
- 689: "The Green Ring Conspiracy, Part 11"
- 690: "The Green Ring Conspiracy, Part 12"
- 691: "Wooton Knows Best"
- 692: "A Penny Saved"
- 693: "The Amazing Loser"
- 694: "Anger Mismanagement"
- 695: "Forgiving More...or Less"
- 696: "You're Two Kind"
- 697: "A Penny Earned"
- 698: "Never for Nothing"
- 699: "Emily the Genius"
- 700: "How to Sink a Sub"
- 701: "Unbecoming Jay"
- 702: "Childish Things"

=== Season 26 (2012) ===
- 703: "The Labyrinth, Part 1"
- 704: "The Labyrinth, Part 2"
- 705: "The Labyrinth, Part 3"
- 706: "To Mend or Repair"
- 707: "Mistaken for Good"
- 708: "Sergeant York, Part 1"
- 709: "Sergeant York, Part 2"
- 710: "Sergeant York, Part 3"
- 711: "Sergeant York, Part 4"
- 712: "Child's Play"
- 713: "Something Old, Something New, Part 1"
- 714: "Something Old, Something New, Part 2"
- 715: "The Perfect Church, Part 1"
- 716: "The Perfect Church, Part 2"
- 717: "Great Expectations"
- 718: "For Three Dollars More"
- 719: "The Bible Network"
- 720: "Happy Hunting"
- 721: "The Holy Hoopster"
- 722: "The Lost Riddle"
- 723: "Groundhog Jay"
- 724: "Home Again, Part 1"
- 725: "Home Again, Part 2"
- 726: "Push the Red Button"

=== Season 27 (2013) ===
- 727: "Your Servant is Listening, Part 1"
- 728: "Your Servant is Listening, Part 2"
- 729: "No Chemistry Whatsoever"
- 730: "The Friend Formula"
- 731: "More Than a Feeling"
- 732: "Repent After Me"
- 733: "Big Trouble Under the Big Top"
- 734: "Life Expectancy, Part 1"
- 735: "Life Expectancy, Part 2"
- 736: "Life Expectancy, Part 3"
- 737: "The Pilot, Part 1"
- 738: "The Pilot, Part 2"

=== Season 28 (2014) ===
- 739: "The Launch, Part 1"
- 740: "The Launch, Part 2"
- 741: "In a Kingdom Far Away"
- 742: "Drake the Cosmic Copper"
- 743: "Mission: Unaccomplished, Part 1"
- 744: "Mission: Unaccomplished, Part 2"
- 745: "Like a Good Neighbor"
- 746: "The Lone Lawman"
- 747: "Thirty Jays Hath September"
- 748: "The Perfect Gift"
- 749: "The Drop Box"
- 750: "All by Myself"
- 751: "The Ties That Bind, Part 1"
- 752: "The Ties That Bind, Part 2"
- 753: "The Ties That Bind, Part 3"
- 754: "The Ties That Bind, Part 4"
- 755: "The Ties That Bind, Part 5"
- 756: "The Ties That Bind, Part 6"
- 757: "The Ties That Bind, Part 7"
- 758: "The Ties That Bind, Part 8"
- 759: "The Ties That Bind, Part 9"
- 760: "The Ties That Bind, Part 10"
- 761: "The Ties That Bind, Part 11"
- 762: "The Ties That Bind, Part 12"
- 763: "The Ties That Bind, Part 13"
- 764: "The Ties That Bind, Part 14"

=== Season 29 (2015) ===
- 765: Follow Me
- 766: The Cure, Part 1
- 767: The Cure, Part 2
- 768: The Cure, Part 3
- 769: B-TV: To Tell the Truth
- 770: To the Ends of the Earth
- 771: Pinocchio: The Tale of a Foolish Puppet, Part 1
- 772: Pinocchio: The Tale of a Foolish Pupper, Part 2
- 773: "Hidden Gems"
- 774: "Walter's Flying Bus"
- 775: "Take It on Trust"
- 776: "A Daughter's Love"
- 777: "First Things First"
- 778: "Playing the Predictable"
- 779: "A Big Commitment"
- 780: "Dinner Roll Models"
- 781: "Out of the Woods"
- 782: "Let's Get Together"

=== Season 30 (2016) ===
- 783: "Words From the Wise"
- 784: "Cycle of Fear"
- 785: "No Cause for Concern"
- 786: "The Case of the Ball Cap Hero"
- 787: "Between the Lines, Part 1"
- 788: "Between the Lines, Part 2"
- 789: "The Journal of John Avery Whittaker"
- 790: "Walk This Way"
- 791: "When One Door Closes, Part 1"
- 792: "When One Door Closes, Part 2"
- 793: "The Good Soil"
- 794: "Things Not Seen"
- 795: "The Boat People, Part 1"
- 796: "The Boat People, Part 2"
- 797: "A Predicament of Biblical Proportions"
- 798: "A Forgiving Heart"
- 799: "Where Your Treasure Is"
- 800: "Un-Tech the Halls"
- 801: "The Feud of Mason County"
- 802: "Parker for President"
- 803: "Old Tricks"
- 804: "The Key Suspect"
- 805: "A Very Bassett Wedding, Part 1"
- 806: "A Very Bassett Wedding, Part 2"

=== Season 31 (2017) ===
- 807: "Connie the Counselor"
- 808: "No Friend Like an Old Friend"
- 809: "Fathers and Sons"
- 810: "The Grass is Always Greener"
- 811: "Legacy, Part 1"
- 812: "Legacy, Part 2"
- 813: "One More Name, Part 1"
- 814: "One More Name, Part 2"
- 815: "One More Name, Part 3"
- 816: "A Perfect Testimony"
- 817: "Unfair Game"
- 818: "Swept Away, Part 1"
- 819: "Swept Away, Part 2"
- 820: "The Legend of Sperry McGerk"
- 821: "Angels in Horsehair"
- 822: "There and Back Again, Part 1"
- 823: "There and Back Again, Part 2"
- 824: "There and Back Again, Part 3"
- 825: "There and Back Again, Part 4"
- 826: "Find a Penny, Part 1"
- 827: "Find a Penny, Part 2"
- 828: "Friend or Foe"
- 829: "Have a Heart"
- 830: "B-TV: Revenge"
- 831: "Crash Course"

=== Season 32 (2018) ===
- 832: "Your Honest Opinion, Please"
- 833: "The Secret of the Writer's Ruse"
- 834: "Sir Buddy's Snowy Day"
- 835: "David and Absalom, Part 1"
- 836: "David and Absalom, Part 2"
- 837: "Out of the Picture"
- 838: "Rewinding the Big Picture"
- 839: "Met His Match"
- 840: "Failing to the Finish Line"
- 841: "Drake and the Time That Time Forgot"
- 842: "Mean Streak"
- 843: "Always Do Your Best-ish"
- 844: "Charlotte"
- 845: "Walk Worthy"
- 846: "The Last Straw"
- 847: "Beyond Repair"
- 848: "The New Olivia"
- 849: "Out to Sea"
- 850: "The Shame About Fame"
- 851: "The Sandwich Initiative"
- 852: "The Toy"
- 853: "The Good in People"
- 854: "Not What I Expected"
- 855: "Divided We Fall"

=== Season 33 (2019) ===
- 856: "Much Ado About Jealousy"
- 857: "Same Mold Story"
- 858: "B-TV: Trinity"
- 859: "The Long End, Part 1"
- 860: "The Long End, Part 2"
- 861: "The Long End, Part 3"
- 862: “In a Sun-Scorched Land, Part 1”
- 863: “In a Sun-Scorched Land, Part 2”
- 864: “Between Camp and a Hard Place, Part 1”
- 865: “Between Camp and a Hard Place, Part 2”
- 866: “Rumpelstiltskin: A Wee Little Tale”
- 867: “Take Every Thought Captive”
- 868: “All for the Guest”
- 869: “B-TV: Idolatry”
- 870: “The World of Whitonia”
- 871: “Icky and Kat and Balty and Bones”
- 872: “The Morning Star”
- 873: “Lifted Out of Context”
- 874: "Rightly Dividing"
- 875: "Man of the House"
- 876: "Page from the Playbook"
- 877: "A Sacrificial Escape"
- 878: "Nightmares By Constance, Part 1"
- 879: "Nightmares By Constance, Part 2"

=== Season 34 (2020) ===
- 880: “Good Job!”
- 881: “Playing Favorites”
- 882: “A Wise Surprise”
- 883: “Breaking News”
- 884: “Always Home”
- 885: “Further from the Truth”
- 886: "Unsinkable, Part 1"
- 887: "Unsinkable, Part 2"
- 888: "Out of Her Element"
- 889: "Young Whit and the Revolutionary Secret"
- 890: "Bridget, Redefined"
- 891: "Cars, Trains, and Motorcycles"
- 892: "Millstones"
- 893: "Badges of Honor"
- 894: "A Simple Reminder"
- 895: "The Martyr and the Rooster"
- 896: "The Forever Gift"
- 897: "Teach a Man"
- 898: "The Rydell Revelations, Part 1"
- 899: "The Rydell Revelations, Part 2"
- 900: "The Rydell Revelations, Part 3"
- 901: "For a Song"
- 902: "California Dreams, Part 1"
- 903: "California Dreams, Part 2"

=== Season 35 (2021) ===
- 904: "Jumping Off, Jumping In"
- 905: "Auto Response"
- 906: "Unrelatable"
- 907: "The Protector"
- 908: "The Christmas Bells"
- 909: "Let's Call the Whole Thing Off"
- 910: If I Never Told You
- 911: Kopfkino: A Hare, A Hedgehog, and A Doof
- 912: The Clown Hero
- 913: Search for a Sunflower
- 914: Hurricane Perkins
- 915: The Revenge of Bigfoot
- 916: Voice of Freedom, Part 1
- 917: Voice of Freedom, Part 2
- 918: The Snow Must Go On
- 919: Sew On and Snow Forth
- 920: Snow 'Em Who's Boss
- 921: Make Snow Mistake
- 922: The Team
- 923: Please Adjust Your Frequency
- 924: Higher Than Our Ways
- 925: Triple-Decker Sundae
- 926: Set a Watchman
- 927: Worth It
- 928: The Lost One, Part 1
- 929: The Lost One, Part 2

=== Season 36 (2022) ===
- 930: Judge Me Tender
- 931: As Buck Would Have It, Part 1
- 932: As Buck Would Have It, Part 2
- 933: As Buck Would Have It, Part 3
- 934: A Dickensian Dilemma
- 935: In for a Penny
- 936: Drake and the Aberrant Automaton
- 937: The Way of the Comic Book
- 938: Knox on Love
- 939: Results May Vary
- 940: Fishing for Gold
- 941: The Honor of Obed Edom
- 942: The 18-Yard Line
- 943: Showdown in San Poco
- 944: A Friend in Need
- 945: Knox on Sacrifice
- 946: Morning
- 947: Afternoon
- 948: Evening
- 949: Dead of Night
- 950: Daybreak
- 951: Final Minutes

=== Season 37 (2023) ===
- 952: Game Night
- 953: Renee Renewed
- 954: Legally Wooton
- 955: Value in the Process
- 956: Tough Call
- 957: King of My Heart
- 958: Reporting Live from Mount Sinai
- 959: Dose of Virtual Reality
- 960: The Jacobs Report: Robert Smalls
- 961: Survivor Boy
- 962: The Fast and the Ridiculous
- 963: Mile 151
- 964: As Far As It Depends On Me
- 965: Two's Company, Four's A Crowd
- 966: The Best Is Yet To Come, Part 1
- 967: The Best Is Yet To Come, Part 2
- 968: The Best Is Yet To Come, Part 3
- 969: The Best Is Yet To Come, Part 4
- 970: Precious Lord, Part 1
- 971: Precious Lord, Part 2
- 972: Alibis
- 973: Extended Cut
- 974: The Show Must Go On (and On)
- 975: Naughty or Nice

=== Season 38 (2024) ===
- 976: The Rydell Realizations, Part 1
- 977: The Rydell Realizations, Part 2
- 978: The Rydell Realizations, Part 3
- 979: Right Notes, Wrong Key
- 980: Making An Honest Buck, Part 1
- 981: Making An Honest Buck, Part 2
- 982: The Ark's the Thing
- 983: One Last Treasure Hunt
- 984: Running the Race, Part 1
- 985: Running the Race, Part 2
- 986: Running the Race, Part 3
- 987: Quiet As A Smouse
- 988: The Heavens Declare
- 989: The Smouse Show
- 990: Painted Into A Corner
- 991: Making Nice
- 992: Unmanageable
- 993: Facing the Music
- 994: The Hero's Laundry
- 995: Worth Her Wage
- 996: Drake and the Heart Drive
- 997: You Dirty Rat
- 998: Express Salvation
- 999: Not the Same

=== Season 39 (2025) ===
- 1000: Kris-crossed, Part 1
- 1001: Kris-crossed, Part 2
- 1002: Better Buck Next Time, Part 1
- 1003: Better Buck Next Time, Part 2
- 1004: Better Buck Next Time, Part 3
- 1005: My Hero Renee
- 1006: School of Hard Knocks
- 1007: Up His Sleeve
- 1008: Ambush
- 1009: Bottled Up
- 1010: The Difference
- 1011: The Picture Day Plot
- 1012: Crossing the Line, Part 1
- 1013: Crossing the Line, Part 2
- 1014: Just Another Day
- 1015: Two Steps Forward, Three Steps Back
- 1016: On the Edge, Part 1
- 1017: On the Edge, Part 2
- 1018: Keeping Score
- 1019: Put to the Test
- 1020: Aunt Vicki
- 1021: Out of the Spotlight
- 1022: Being Real
- 1023: The Smouse Family Christmas

=== Season 40 (2026) ===
- 1024: Value of a Buck, Part 1
- 1025: Value of a Buck, Part 2
- 1026: Face the Future
- 1027: Face the Unknown
- 1028: Face the Truth
- 1029: This Is My Story
- 1030: Knox on Money
- 1031: Now Hiring
- 1032: As Iron Sharpens Iron
- 1033: The Prodigal Twin, Part 1
- 1034: The Prodigal Twin, Part 2
- 1035: Word in the Hallway
- 1036: What's the Catch?
- 1037: A Quick Fix
- 1038: Accountability, Please
- 1039: The Great Yellowstone Heist
- 1040: The Measure of a Patriot, Part 1
- 1041: The Measure of a Patriot, Part 2
- 1042: You're In Good Hands
- 1043: Suggestion Box
- 1044: Babysitting Bassetts
- 1045: Teambuilding University
- 1046: Ready When You Are
- 1047: Fighting Back
- 1048: The Influencers
- 1049: Born For Adversity
- 1050: The Pen
- 1051: The Dais
- 1052: The Vault, Part 1
- 1053: The Vault, Part 2
- 1054: The Vault, Part 3

== Albums ==
Originally, the first few albums included every episode in chronological order exactly as it aired on the radio. The 3rd album release (#2) would have featured the episodes starting with the 19th episode "Recollections" and ending around the 30th episode "Honor Thy Parents", but it was shelved when the controversy surrounding the character Officer David Harley (voiced by veteran voice actor Will Ryan) occurred. The following album, Grins, Grabbers, and Great Getaways (1988) was then released, continuing where the unreleased album would have left off. After those releases, future albums no longer followed the exact chronological order, and starting with the 5th album release, Daring Deeds, Sinister Schemes (1989), many episodes were often edited to remove references to product promotions and upcoming episodes.

In February 2025, Focus on the Family announced that Album 80, to be released in Spring 2026, will be the last album released on CD and all future albums and episodes produced after Album 80 will be released exclusively on the Adventures in Odyssey Club.

- Family Portraits (1987)
- The Lost Episodes (2007)
- The Office Harley Collection (2014) (Adventures in Odyssey Club Exclusive)
- 1: Odyssey USA (1988) / Re-titled Adventures in Odyssey (1989) and later replaced by The Early Classics (1992), presently The Adventure Begins
- 2: Grins, Grabbers, and Great Getaways (1988), later "Stormy Weather," presently The Wildest Summer Ever
- 3: Secrets, Surprises, and Sensational Stories (1988), presently Heroes
- 4: Puns, Parables, and Perilous Predicaments (1989), presently FUN-damentals
- 5: Daring Deeds, Sinister Schemes (1989)
- 6: Terrific Tales, Mysterious Missions (1990), presently Mission Accomplished
- 7: Courageous Characters, Fabulous Friends (1990), presently On Thin Ice
- 8: Cunning Capers, Exciting Escapades (1991), presently Beyond Expectations
- 9: Amazing Antics, Dynamic Discoveries (1991), presently Just in Time
- 10: Other Times . . . Other Places (1991)
- 11: It's Another Fine Day . . . (1991)
- 12: At Home and Abroad (1992)
- 13: It All Started When . . . (1992)
- 14: Meanwhile, in Another Part of Town (1992)
- 15: A Place of Wonder (1993)
- 16: Flights of Imagination (1993)
- 17: On Earth as It Is in Heaven (1993)
- 18: A Time of Discovery (1994)
- 19: Passport to Adventure (1994)
- 20: A Journey of Choices (1994)
- 21: Wish You Were Here! (1994)
- 22: The Changing Times (1995)
- 23: Twists and Turns (1995)
- 24: Risks and Rewards (1995)
- 25: Darkness Before Dawn (1995)
- 26: Back on the Air (1996)
- 27: The Search for Whit (1996)
- 28: Welcome Home (1996)
- 29: Signed, Sealed & Committed (1998)
- 30: Through Thick & Thin (1998)
- 31: Days to Remember (1998)
- 32: Hidden Treasures (1998)
- 33: Virtual Realities (1999)
- 34: In Your Wildest Dreams (2000)
- 35: The Big Picture (2001)
- 36: Danger Signals (2001)
- 37: Countermoves (2002)
- 38: Battle Lines (2002)
- 39: Friends, Family & Countrymen (2003)
- 40: Out of Control (2003)
- 41: In Hot Pursuit (2004)
- 42: No Way Out (2004)
- 43: Along for the Ride (2005)
- 44a: A Most Surprising Return (half of Album 44: Eugene Returns!) (2005)
- 44b: A Most Amazing Event (half of Album 44: Eugene Returns!) (2005)
- 44: Eugene Returns! (2005)
- 45a: The Mystery of the Lost Village (half of Album 45: Lost & Found) (2005)
- 45b: Odd-itions (half of Album 45: Lost & Found) (2006)
- 45: Lost & Found (2006)
- 46: A Date with Dad (and Other Calamities) (2006)
- 47: Into the Light (2007)
- 48: Moment of Truth (2007)
- 49: The Sky's the Limit (2008)
- 50: The Best Small Town (2008)
- The Truth Chronicles (2008)
- Passages: Darien's Rise (2009)
- 51: Take it From the Top (2010)
- 52: Cause and Effect (2010)
- 53: The Green Ring Conspiracy (2011)
- 54: Clanging Cymbals and the Meaning of God's Love (2011)
- 55: The Deep End (2012)
- 56: The Grand Design (2012)
- 57: A Call to Something More (2013)
- 57 1/2: Club Season 1 (2014) (Adventures in Odyssey Club Exclusive)
- 58: The Ties that Bind (2014)
- 58 1/2: Club Season 2 (2015) (Adventures in Odyssey Club Exclusive)
- 59: Taking the Plunge (2015)
- 60: Head over Heels (2016)
- 60 1/2: Club Season 3 (2016) (Adventures in Odyssey Club Exclusive)
- 61: Without A Hitch (2016)
- 62: Let's Put on a Show! (2017)
- 62 1/2: Club Season 4 (2017) (Adventures in Odyssey Club Exclusive)
- 63: Up in the Air (2017)
- 64: Under the Surface (2018)
- 64 1/2: Club Season 5 (2018) (Adventures in Odyssey Club Exclusive)
- 65: Expect the Unexpected (2018)
- 66: Trial by Fire (2019)
- 66 1/2: Club Season 6 (2019) (Adventures in Odyssey Club Exclusive)
- 67: More Than Meets The Eye (2019)
- 68: Out of the Blue (2020)
- 68 1/2: Club Season 7 (2020) (Adventures in Odyssey Club Exclusive)
- 69: Best Kept Secrets (2020)
- 70: Finding A Way (2021)
- 70 1/2: Club Season 8 (2021) (Adventures in Odyssey Club Exclusive)
- 71: A Slippery Slope (2021)
- 72: The Long Road Home (2022)
- 72 1/2: Club Season 9 (2022) (Adventures in Odyssey Club Exclusive)
- 73: 28 Hours (2022)
- 74: Buckle Up! (2023)
- 74 1/2: Club Season 10, Part 1 (2023) (Adventures in Odyssey Club Exclusive)
- 75: The Best Is Yet To Come (2023)
- 75 1/2: Club Season 10, Part 2 (2023) (Adventures in Odyssey Club Exclusive)
- 76: Keep It Together (2024)
- 76 1/2: Club Season 11, Part 1 (2024) (Adventures in Odyssey Club Exclusive)
- 77: A New Perspective (2024)
- 77 1/2: Club Season 11, Part 2 (2024) (Adventures in Odyssey Club Exclusive)
- 78: At Face Value (2025)
- 78 1/2: Club Season 12, Part 1 (2025) (Adventures in Odyssey Club Exclusive)
- 79: Eleventh Hour (2025)
- 79 1/2: Club Season 12, Part 2 (2025) (Adventures in Odyssey Club Exclusive)
- 80: Rewritten (2026)
- 81: Never A Dull Moment (2026)
- 82: Learning Curve (2026)
- 83: Phase One (2026)

== Episodes by Album ==
Family Portraits (1987)

- FP01: "Whit's Visitor"
- FP02: "Dental Dilemma"
- FP03: "The New Kid in Town"
- FP04: "No Stupid Questions""
- FP05: "You're Not Gonna Believe This..."
- FP06: "My Brother's Keeper"
- FP07: "While Dad's Away"
- FP08: "The Letter"
- FP09: "A Different Kind of Peer Pressure"
- FP10: "In Memory of Herman"
- FP11: "A Member of the Family, Part 1"
- FP12: "A Member of the Family, Part 2"
- FP13: "A Simple Addition"

The Officer Harley Collection (Adventures in Odyssey Club exclusive) (2014)

- 003: "Lights Out at Whit's End"
- 009: "Doing Unto Others"
- 011: "Addictions Can Be Habit Forming"
- 013: "Bobby's Valentine"
- 014: "Missed It by That Much"
- 021: "The Case of the Missing Train Car"
- 023: "The Quality of Mercy"
- 024: "Gotcha"
- 025: "Harley Takes the Case, Part 1"
- 026: "Harley Takes the Case, Part 2"
- 070: "The Return of Harley, Part 1"
- 071: "The Return of Harley, Part 2"

The Lost Episodes (2002)

- 008: "Dental Dilemma"
- 015: "My Brother's Keeper"
- 016: "No Stupid Questions"
- 022: "A Simple Addition"
- 030: "Honor Thy Parents"
- 044: "It Sure Seems Like It to Me"
- 045: "What Are We Gonna Do About Halloween?"
- 055: "Auld Lang Syne"
- 116: "Isaac the Benevolent"
- 117: "The Trouble With Girls"
- 134: "Pamela Has a Problem"
- 142: "Train Ride"
- 161: "Isaac the True Friend"
- 435: "A Look Back, Part 1"
- 436: "A Look Back, Part 2"
- 500: "500"
- 501: "Inside the Studio"

1 - The Adventure Begins (1988)

- 001: "Whit's Flop"
- 002: "The Life of the Party"
- 004: "Connie Comes to Town"
- 005: "Gifts for Madge & Guy"
- 006: "The Day After Christmas"
- 007: "Promises, Promises"
- 010: "Nothing to Fear"
- 012: "The Tangled Web"
- 017: "A Member of the Family, Part 1"
- 018: "A Member of the Family, Part 2"
- 019: "Recollections"
- 027: "A Change of Hart"

2 - The Wildest Summer Ever (1988)

- 031: "Family Vacation, Part 1"
- 032: "Family Vacation, Part 2"
- 033: "The Day Independence Came"
- 034: "Stormy Weather"
- 035: "V.B.S. Blues"
- 036: "Kids' Radio"
- 037: "Camp What-a-Nut, Part 1"
- 038: "Camp What-a-Nut, Part 2"
- 039: "The Case of the Secret Room, Part 1"
- 040: "The Case of the Secret Room, Part 2"
- 041: "Return to the Bible Room"
- 042: "The Last Great Adventure of the Summer"

3 - Heroes (1988)

- 021: "Mike Makes Right"
- 029: "Rumor Has It"
- 043: "Back to School"
- 046: "The Shepherd and the Giant"
- 047: "A Single Vote"
- 048: "Heroes"
- 049: "Thank You, God"
- 050: "Karen"
- 051: "Connie, Part 1"
- 052: "Connie, Part 2"
- 053: "The Sacred Trust"
- 054: "Peace on Earth"

4 - FUN-damentals (1989)

- 056: "By Faith, Noah"
- 057: "The Prodigal, Jimmy"
- 058: "A Matter of Obedience"
- 059: "A Worker Approved"
- 060: "And When You Pray. . ."
- 061: "The Boy Who Didn't Go To Church"
- 062: "Let This Mind Be in You"
- 063: "A Good and Faithful Servant"
- 064: "The Greatest of These"
- 065: "Bad Company"
- 068: "Choices"
- 069: "Go Ye Therefore"

5 - Daring Deeds, Sinister Schemes (1989)

- 066: "The Imagination Station, Part 1"
- 067: "The Imagination Station, Part 2"
- 072: "An Encounter with Mrs. Hooper"
- 073: "A Bite of Applesauce"
- 074: "Connie Goes to Camp, Part 1"
- 075: "Connie Goes to Camp, Part 2"
- 076: "Eugene's Dilemma"
- 077: "The Nemesis, Part 1"
- 078: "The Nemesis, Part 2"
- 079: "Our Best Vacation Ever"
- 083: "The Battle, Part 1"
- 084: "The Battle, Part 2"

6 - Mission: Accomplished (1989)

- 028: "The Price of Freedom"
- 080: "A Prisoner for Christ"
- 081: "Good Business"
- 082: "Heatwave"
- 087: "Elijah, Part 1"
- 088: "Elijah, Part 2"
- 089: "That's Not Fair!"
- 090: "But, You Promised"
- 091: "A Mission for Jimmy"
- 092: "The Ill-Gotten Deed"
- 093: "Rescue from Manatugo Point"
- 094: "Operation DigOut"
- 102: "The Treasure of LeMonde!"

7 - On Thin Ice (1989)

- 086: "Isaac the Insecure"
- 095: "The Very Best of Friends"
- 096: "The Reluctant Rival"
- 097: "Monty's Christmas"
- 098: "The Visitors"
- 099: "The Barclay Family Ski Vacation"
- 100: "Ice Fishing"
- 101: "Scattered Seeds"
- 103: "Front Page News"
- 104: "Lincoln, Part 1"
- 105: "Lincoln, Part 2"
- 108: "Isaac the Courageous"
- 128: "One Bad Apple"
- 132: "Thanksgiving at Home"

8 - Beyond Expectations (1990)

- 106: "By Any Other Name"
- 107: "Bad Luck"
- 110: "A...is for Attitude"
- 111: "First Love"
- 112: "Curious, Isn't It?"
- 113: "Suspicious Minds"
- 115: "An Act of Mercy"
- 120: "Pranks for the Memories"
- 121: "Missing Person"
- 122: "Castles & Cauldrons, Part 1"
- 123: "Castles & Cauldrons, Part 2"
- 124: "The Winning Edge"
- 125: "All's Well With Boswell"
- 138: "The Adventure of the Adventure"

9 - Just In Time (1990)

- 109: "Two Sides to Every Story"
- 114: "The Big Broadcast"
- 118: "What Happened to the Silver Streak?"
- 119: "Better Late than Never"
- 126: "Wishful Thinking"
- 127: "Have You No Selpurcs?"
- 129: "Not One of Us"
- 130: "Bernard & Joseph, Part 1"
- 131: "Bernard & Joseph, Part 2"
- 133: "Cousin Albert"
- 140: "The Vow"
- 141: "Over the Airwaves"
- 502: "Live at the 25!"

10 - Other Times, Other Places (1991)

- 135: "Back to Bethlehem, Part 1"
- 136: "Back to Bethlehem, Part 2"
- 137: "Back to Bethlehem, Part 3"
- 139: "Melanie's Diary"
- 144: "Someone to Watch Over Me"
- 145: "The Second Coming"
- 146: "Emotional Baggage"
- 148: "Isaac the Procrastinator"
- 155: "Waylaid in the Windy City, Part 1"
- 156: "Waylaid in the Windy City, Part 2"
- 157: "Last in a Long Line"
- 159: "The Homecoming"

11 - It's Another Fine Day..."

- 143: "Muckraker"
- 147: "Where There's a Will. . ."
- 149: "By Dawn's Early Light"
- 150: "Home is Where the Hurt Is"
- 151: ". . . The Last Shall Be First"
- 152: "The Meaning of Sacrifice"
- 153: "Mayor for a Day"
- 154: "Coming of Age"
- 158: "A Day in the Life"
- 160: "A Rathbone of Contention"
- 165: "Bernard & Esther, Part 1"
- 166: "Bernard & Esther, Part 2"

12 - At Home and Abroad (1991)

- 163: "A Model Child"
- 168: "The Curse"
- 169: "Hold Up!"
- 170: "A Test for Robyn"
- 171: "The Cross of Cortes, Part 1"
- 172: "The Cross of Cortes, Part 2"
- 173: "A Thanksgiving Carol"
- 174: "Where's Your Daddy?"
- 175: "East Winds, Raining"
- 176: "The Star, Part 1"
- 177: "The Star, Part 2"
- 178: "Room Mates"

13 - It All Started When... (1992)

- 167: "Dobson Comes to Town"
- 179: "You Gotta Be Wise"
- 180: "Isaac the Pure"
- 181: "It Takes Integrity"
- 182: "The Scales of Justice"
- 183: "Tales of Moderation"
- 184: "Isaac the Chivalrous"
- 185: "A Question of Loyalty"
- 186: "The Conscientious Cross-Guard"
- 187: "An Act of Nobility"
- 188: "The Courage to Stand"
- 189: "No, Honestly!"
- 192: "Modesty is the Best Policy"

14 - Meanwhile, In Another Part of Town (1992)

- 162: "Peacemaker"
- 164: "Sixties-Something"
- 190: "Moses, the Passover, Part 1"
- 191: "Moses, the Passover, Part 2"
- 193: "A Tongue of Fire"
- 194: "A License to Drive"
- 195: "Father's Day"
- 196: "Harlow Doyle, Private Eye"
- 197: "The Midnight Ride"
- 198: "Treasure Hunt"
- 200: "Feud for Thought"
- 202: "Timmy's Cabin"

15 - A Place of Wonder (1992)

- 199: "The "No" Factor"
- 201: "Fair-Weather Fans"
- 203: "Double Trouble"
- 204: "Wonderworld"
- 205: "Flash Flood"
- 206: "Pen Pal"
- 207: "The Case of the Candid Camera"
- 208: "Pipe Dreams"
- 210: "On Solid Ground"
- 215: "Caroling, Caroling"
- 217: "Rights, Wrongs & Reasons"
- 218: "A Class Act"
- 223: "Real Time"

16 - Flights of Imagination (1993)

- 209: "Columbus: The Grand Voyage"
- 211: "The Mortal Coil, Part 1"
- 212: "The Mortal Coil, Part 2"
- 213: "Best Intentions"
- 214: "The Living Nativity"
- 216: "Like Father, Like Son"
- 219: "Treasures of the Heart"
- 220: "This is Chad Pearson?"
- 221: "It Is Well"
- 226: "An Adventure in Bethany, Part 1"
- 227: "An Adventure in Bethany, Part 2"
- 228: "A Game of Compassion"

17 - On Earth As It Is In Heaven (1993)

- 230: "Our Father"
- 231: "Hallowed Be Thy Name"
- 232: "Thy Kingdom Come"
- 233: "Thy Will Be Done"
- 234: "Our Daily Bread"
- 235: "Forgive Us as We Forgive"
- 236: "Into Temptation"
- 237: "Deliver Us From Evil"
- 238: "For Thine is the Kingdom"
- 239: "The Power"
- 240: "And the Glory"
- 241: "Forever. . .Amen"

18 - A Time of Discovery (1993)

- 222: "The Jesus Cloth"
- 224: "Greater Love"
- 225: "Count It All Joy"
- 229: "The Marriage Feast"
- 242: "Hymn Writers"
- 243: "Family Values"
- 244: "The Mysterious Stranger, Part 1"
- 245: "The Mysterious Stranger, Part 2"
- 246: "My Fair Bernard"
- 247: "Why Don't You Grow Up?"
- 248: "Terror from the Skies"
- 249: "The Case of the Delinquent Disciples"

19 - Passport To Adventure (1994)

- 250: "Pilgrim's Progress Revisited, Part 1"
- 251: "Pilgrim's Progress Revisited, Part 2"
- 252: "The Bad Hair Day"
- 253: "A Time for Christmas"
- 254: "Truth, Trivia & 'Trina"
- 255: "The Boy Who Cried "Destructo!""
- 256: "Aloha, Oy!, Part 1"
- 257: "Aloha, Oy!, Part 2"
- 258: "Aloha, Oy!, Part 3"
- 259: "The Potential in Elliot"
- 260: "Naturally, I Assumed"
- 262: "A Prayer for George Barclay"

20 - A Journey of Choices (1994)

- 261: "Afraid, Not!"
- 263: "When Bad Isn't So Good"
- 264: "Making the Grade"
- 265: "War of the Words"
- 266: "It Began with a Rabbit's Foot"
- 267: "It Ended with a Handshake"
- 268: "Pet Peeves"
- 269: "Fences"
- 270: "The War Hero"
- 271: "The Secret Keys of Discipline"
- 272: "Two Brothers and Bernard, Part 1"
- 273: "Two Brothers and Bernard, Part 2"

21 - Wish You Were Here (1994)

- 274: "First-Hand Experience"
- 275: "Second Thoughts"
- 276: "Third Degree"
- 277: "It Happened at Four Corners"
- 278: "The Fifth House on the Left, Part 1"
- 279: "The Fifth House on the Left, Part 2"
- 280: "Gone . . ."
- 281: ". . . But Not Forgotten"
- 282: "The Fundamentals"
- 283: "A Book by Its Cover"
- 284: "The Election Deception"
- 288: "The Twilife Zone"

22 - The Changing Times (1995)

- 285: "George Under Pressure"
- 286: "Tom for Mayor, Part 1"
- 287: "Tom for Mayor, Part 2"
- 289: "A Call for Reverend Jimmy"
- 290: "A Name, Not a Number, Part 1"
- 291: "A Name, Not a Number, Part 2"
- 292: "Siege at Jericho"
- 293: "A Code of Honor"
- 294: "Unto Us a Child Is Born"
- 295: "Soaplessly Devoted"
- 296: "Red Wagons and Pink Flamingos"
- 297: "Blackbeard's Treasure"

23 - Twist and Turns (1995)

- 298: "I Want My B-TV!"
- 299: "The Truth About Zachary"
- 300: "Preacher's Kid"
- 301: "The Good, the Bad & Butch"
- 302: "Share & Share Alike"
- 303: "All the Difference in the World"
- 304: "Saint Paul: The Man from Tarsus"
- 305: "Saint Paul: Set Apart by God"
- 306: "A Victim of Circumstance"
- 309: "The Perfect Witness, Part 1"
- 310: "The Perfect Witness, Part 2"
- 311: "The Perfect Witness, Part 3"

24 - Risks and Rewards (1995)

- 307: "Poetry in Slow Motion"
- 308: "Subject Yourself"
- 312: "Rewards in Full"
- 313: "Top This!"
- 314: "The Underground Railroad, Part 1"
- 315: "The Underground Railroad, Part 2"
- 316: "The Underground Railroad, Part 3"
- 317: "B-TV: Envy"
- 318: "A Touch of Healing, Part 1"
- 319: "A Touch of Healing, Part 2"
- 320: "Where Is Thy Sting?"
- 322: "The Turning Point"

25 - Darkness Before Dawn (1995)

- 323: "A Little Credit, Please"
- 324: "Small Fires, Little Pools"
- 325: "Angels Unaware"
- 326: "Gathering Thunder"
- 327: "Moving Targets"
- 328: "Hard Losses"
- 329: "The Return"
- 330: "The Time Has Come"
- 331: "Checkmate"
- 332: "Another Chance"
- 333: "The Last Resort"
- 334: "The Final Conflict"

26 - Back on the Air (1996)

- 321: "Hidden In My Heart"
- 335: "Love Is in the Air, Part 1"
- 336: "Love Is in the Air, Part 2"
- 337: "W-O-R-R-Y"
- 338: "Easy Money"
- 339: "Do, for a Change"
- 340: "Pokenberry Falls, R.F.D., Part 1"
- 341: "Pokenberry Falls, R.F.D., Part 2"
- 342: "Welcome Home, Mr. Blackgaard"
- 343: "The Pretty Good Samaritan"
- 346: "Saint Paul: Voyage to Rome"
- 347: "Saint Paul: An Appointment with Caesar"

27 - The Search For Whit (1996)

- 344: "Letting Go"
- 345: "B-TV: Compassion"
- 348: "With a Little Help from My Friends"
- 349: "Blessings in Disguise"
- 350: "The Time of Our Lives"
- 351: "What Are You Gonna Do with Your Life?"
- 352: "Memories of Jerry"
- 353: "A Question About Tasha"
- 354: "Blind Justice"
- 355: "The Search for Whit, Part 1"
- 356: "The Search for Whit, Part 2"
- 357: "The Search for Whit, Part 3"

28 - Welcome Home (1996)

- 358: "The Secret Weapon"
- 359: "The Merchant of Odyssey"
- 360: "Three Funerals and a Wedding, Part 1"
- 361: "Three Funerals and a Wedding, Part 2"
- 362: "The Right Choice, Part 1"
- 363: "The Right Choice, Part 2"
- 364: "Home, Sweet Home"
- 365: "Clara"
- 366: "Solitary Refinement"
- 367: "The Decision"
- 368: "The Other Woman"
- 369: "It's a Wrap!"

29 - Signed, Sealed & Committed (1997)

- 372: "For Whom the Wedding Bells Toll, Part 1"
- 373: "For Whom the Wedding Bells Toll, Part 2"
- 374: "For Whom the Wedding Bells Toll, Part 3"
- 375: "The Pushover"
- 376: "Chores No More"
- 377: "Just Say Yes"
- 378: "The Painting"
- 379: "Best Face Forward"
- 380: "The One About Trust, Part 1"
- 381: "The One About Trust, Part 2"
- 382: "Viva La Difference"
- 384: "Amazing Grace"

30 - Through Thick & Thin (1997)

- 388: "Leap of Faith"
- 389: "OT Action News: Jephthah's Vow"
- 390: "No Bones About It"
- 391: "The Joke's on You"
- 392: "When in Doubt...Pray!"
- 396: "Poor Loser"
- 397: "Tornado!"
- 398: "A Case of Revenge"
- 399: "Bernard & Job"
- 400: "The Spy Who Bugged Me"
- 401: "More Like Alicia"
- 402: "Arizona Sunrise"

31 - Days To Remember (1998)

- 383: "B-TV: Thanks"
- 385: "It's a Pokenberry Christmas, Part 1"
- 386: "It's a Pokenberry Christmas, Part 2"
- 387: "New Years Eve Live!"
- 393: "Wrapped Around Your Finger"
- 394: "Saint Patrick: A Heart Afire, Part 1"
- 395: "Saint Patrick: A Heart Afire, Part 2"
- 403: "Faster Than a Speeding Ticket"
- 404: "Hide & Seek"
- 405: "The Graduate"
- 409: "Natural Born Leader"
- 412: "A Lesson From Mike"

32 - Hidden Treasures (1998)

- 406: "Malachi's Message, Part 1"
- 407: "Malachi's Message, Part 2"
- 408: "Malachi's Message, Part 3"
- 410: "B-TV: Forgiveness"
- 411: "In All Things Give Thanks"
- 413: "The Devil Made Me Do It"
- 414: "Buried Sin"
- 415: "Gloobers!"
- 416: "The Tower"
- 417: "Not-So-Trivial Pursuits"
- 420: "Telemachus, Part 1"
- 421: "Telemachus, Part 2"

33 - Virtual Realities (1999)

- 418: "Opening Day"
- 419: "Another Man's Shoes"
- 424: "Blackgaard's Revenge, Part 1"
- 425: "Blackgaard's Revenge, Part 2"
- 426: "The Buck Starts Here"
- 427: "Something Cliqued Between Us"
- 428: "The Eternal Birthday & Bethany's Imaginary Friend"
- 429: "The Y.A.K. Problem"
- 430: "Blind Girl's Bluff"
- 431: "Where There's Smoke & The Virtual Kid"
- 432: "You Win Some, You Lose Some"
- 433: "The Treasure Room & Chain Reaction"

34 - In Your Wildest Dreams (2000)

- 422: "Passages: Fletcher's Rebellion, Part 1"
- 423: "Passages: Fletcher's Rebellion, Part 2"
- 437: "Sunset Bowlawater & The Long Way Home"
- 438: "The Lyin' Tale & Two Roads"
- 440: "I Slap Floor"
- 441: "What Do You Think? & Idol Minds"
- 443: "Changing Rodney"
- 444: "The Bad Guy & Bethany's Flood"
- 445: "No Boundaries"
- 446: "A Matter of Manners & The Seven Deadly Dwarves"
- 447: "Potlucks & Poetry"
- 448: "Mandy's Debut"

35 - The Big Picture (2000)

- 449: "The Big Deal, Part 1"
- 450: "The Big Deal, Part 2"
- 451: "Life Trials of the Rich & Famous"
- 452: "Missionary Impossible"
- 453: "The Great Wishy Woz, Part 1"
- 454: "The Great Wishy Woz, Part 2"
- 455: "Best Laid Plans"
- 456: "Worst Day Ever"
- 457: "Opportunity Knocks"
- 458: "Red Herring"
- 459: "Slumber Party"
- 460: "Nova Rising"

36 - Danger Signals (2001)

- 462: "The W.E."
- 463: "Green Eyes & Yellow Tulips"
- 464: "The Triangle, Part 1"
- 465: "The Triangle, Part 2"
- 466: "Snow Day"
- 467: "Broken Window"
- 468: "Chains, Part 1"
- 469: "Chains, Part 2"
- 470: "Break a Leg"
- 471: "Fifteen Minutes"
- 472: "Welcoming Wooton"
- 473: "Breaking Point"

37 - Counter Moves (2002)

- 474: "Shining Armor, Part 1"
- 475: "Shining Armor, Part 2"
- 477: "O. T. Action News: Battle at the Kishon"
- 478: "Strange Boy in a Strange Land"
- 479: "Happy Smilers"
- 481: "Grand Opening, Part 1"
- 482: "Grand Opening, Part 2"
- 483: "Secrets"
- 484: "Plan B, Part 1: Missing in Action"
- 485: "Plan B, Part 2: Collision Course"
- 486: "Plan B, Part 3: Cross-Fire"
- 487: "Plan B, Part 4: Resistance"

38 - Battle Lines (2002)

- 488: "Under the Influence, Part 1"
- 489: "Under the Influence, Part 2"
- 490: "The Black Veil, Part 1"
- 491: "The Black Veil, Part 2"
- 492: "Twisting Pathway"
- 493: "Sheep's Clothing"
- 494: "Box of Miracles"
- 495: "The Unraveling"
- 496: "Exceptional Circumstances"
- 497: "Expect the Worst"
- 498: "Exactly As Planned"
- 499: "Exit"

39 - Friends, Family and Countrymen (2003)

- 461: "B-TV: Obedience"
- 476: "Relatively Annoying"
- 480: "The Popsicle Kid"
- 503: "Between You and Me"
- 504: "Aubrey's Bathrobe"
- 505: "The Toy Man"
- 506: "For Trying Out Loud"
- 507: "The Benefit of the Doubt"
- 508: "The American Revelation, Part 1"
- 509: "The American Revelation, Part 2"
- 511: "The Pact, Part 1"
- 512: "The Pact, Part 2"

40 - Out of Control (2003)

- 510: "For the Fun of It"
- 514: "Room Enough for Two"
- 515: "B-TV: Behind the Scenes"
- 516: "Bassett Hounds"
- 517: "It's All About Me"
- 518: "The Case of the Disappearing Hortons"
- 519: "The Defining Moment"
- 520: "The Mystery at Tin Flat"
- 522: "All Things to All People"
- 523: "Here Today, Gone Tomorrow? Part 1"
- 524: "Here Today, Gone Tomorrow? Part 2"
- 525: "Here Today, Gone Tomorrow? Part 3"

41 - In Hot Pursuit (2003)

- 513: "Do or Diet"
- 521: "Hindsight"
- 526: "Seeing Red"
- 527: "Black Clouds"
- 528: "The Taming of the Two"
- 529: "The Mailman Cometh"
- 530: "Silver Lining"
- 531: "Teacher's Pest"
- 532: "Pink is Not My Color"
- 533: "Something Blue, Part 1"
- 534: "Something Blue, Part 2"
- 537: "My Girl Hallie"

42 - No Way Out (2004)

- 535: "Living in the Gray, Part 1"
- 536: "Living in the Gray, Part 2"
- 538: "Stubborn Streaks"
- 539: "Called on in Class"
- 540: "The Girl in the Sink"
- 541: "Bernard & Saul"
- 542: "Eggshells"
- 543: "Nothing But the Half Truth"
- 544: "Split Ends"
- 545: "Something's Got to Change"
- 546: "No Way Out, Part 1"
- 547: "No Way In, Part 2"

43 - Along For the Ride (2005)

- 548: "Sounds Like a Mystery"
- 549: "Think on These Things"
- 550: "Fairy Tal-e-vision"
- 551: "Stars in Our Eyes"
- 552: "Sunday Morning Scramble"
- 553: "Potential Possibilities"
- 554: "Call Me if You Care"
- 555: "True Calling"
- 556: "And That's the Truth"
- 557: "A Lamb's Tale"
- 558: "A Glass Darkly"
- 559: "The Coolest Dog"

44 - Eugene Returns! (2005)

- 560: "The Present Long Ago"
- 561: "Lost by a Nose"
- 562: "The Last "I Do""
- 563: "Tuesdays with Wooton"
- 564: "A Most Intriguing Question"
- 565: "A Most Surprising Answer"
- 566: "A Most Extraordinary Conclusion"
- 567: "Two Friends and a Truck"
- 568: "The Power of One"
- 569: "The Invisible Dog"
- 570: "For Better or for Worse, Part 1"
- 571: "For Better or for Worse, Part 2"

45 - Lost & Found (2005)

- 572: "Odyssey Sings!"
- 573: "Back to Abnormal"
- 574: "Prisoners of Fear, Part 1"
- 575: "Prisoners of Fear, Part 2"
- 576: "Prisoners of Fear, Part 3"
- 577: "The Business of Busyness"
- 578: "All-Star Witness"
- 579: "Always"
- 580: "Tales of a Small-Town Thug"
- 581: "A Christmas Conundrum"
- 582: "Silent Night"
- 583: "The Champ of the Camp"

46 - A Date with Dad (and Other Calamities) (2006)

- 584: "Dead Ends"
- 585: "The Poor Rich Guy"
- 586: "A Cheater Cheated"
- 587: "Bringing Up Dads"
- 588: "Broken-Armed and Dangerous"
- 589: "The Impossible"
- 590: "Three O'Clock Call"
- 591: "Switch"
- 592: "Now More Than Ever"
- 593: "Around the Block"
- 594: "A Time for Action, Part 1"
- 595: "A Time for Action, Part 2"

47 - Into the Light (2006)

- 596: "Cover of Darkness"
- 597: "Out of Our Hands"
- 598: "My Favorite Thing"
- 599: "Blood, Sweat, and Fears"
- 600: "The Nudge"
- 601: "Bernard & Jeremiah"
- 602: "Mum's the Word"
- 603: "The Family Next Door"
- 604: "Like Father, Like Wooton"
- 605: "The Chosen One, Part 1"
- 606: "The Chosen One, Part 2"
- 607: "The Undeniable Truth"

48 - Moment of Truth (2007)

- 434: "B-TV: Redeeming the Season"
- 608: "Run-of-the-Mill Miracle"
- 609: "Prequels of Love"
- 610: "Hear Me, Hear Me"
- 611: "The Top Floor, Part 1"
- 612: "The Top Floor, Part 2"
- 613: "The Top Floor, Part 3"
- 614: "Best of Enemies"
- 615: "Only By His Grace"
- 616: "The Other Side of the Glass, Part 1"
- 617: "The Other Side of the Glass, Part 2"
- 618: "The Other Side of the Glass, Part 3 "

49 - The Sky's the Limit (2007)

- 619: "A New Era, Part 1"
- 620: "A New Era, Part 2"
- 621: "A New Era, Part 3"
- 622: "B-TV: Temptation"
- 623: "Buddy Guard"
- 624: "Wooing Wooton"
- 625: "Something Significant"
- 626: "Life, In the Third Person, Part 1"
- 627: "Life, In the Third Person, Part 2"
- 628: "The Highest Stakes, Part 1"
- 629: "The Highest Stakes, Part 2"
- 630: "Chip Off the Shoulder"

50 - The Best Small Town (2008)

- 631: "A Capsule Comes to Town"
- 632: "Suspicious Finds"
- 633: "License to Deprive"
- 634: "Accidental Dilemma, Part 1"
- 635: "Accidental Dilemma, Part 2"
- 636: "A Class Reenactment"
- 637: "The Forgotten Deed"
- 638: "The Triangled Web, Part 1"
- 639: "The Triangled Web, Part 2"
- 640: "Rights, Wrongs, and Winners"
- 641: "The Imagination Station, Revisited, Part 1"
- 642: "The Imagination Station, Revisited, Part 2"

The Truth Chronicles (2008)

- 643: "Kidsboro, Part 1"
- 644: "Kidsboro, Part 2"
- 645: "Kidsboro, Part 3"
- TC1: "Here Am I"
- TC2: "The Truth Be Told"
- TC3: "The Science Club"
- TC4: "Three in One"
- TC5: "In My Image"
- TC6: "Stepping Stones, Part 1"
- TC7: "Stepping Stones, Part 2"
- TC8: "The Final Call"

Passages: Darien's Rise (2009)

- 646: "Passages: Darien's Rise, Part 1"
- 647: "Passages: Darien's Rise, Part 2"
- 648: "Passages: Darien's Rise, Part 3"
- 649: "Passages: Darien's Rise, Part 4"
- 650: "Passages: Darien's Rise, Part 5"
- 651: "Passages: Darien's Rise, Part 6"
- 652: "Passages: Darien's Rise, Part 7"
- 653: "Passages: Darien's Rise, Part 8"
- 654: "Passages: Darien's Rise, Part 9"

51 - Take It From the Top (2010)

- 655: "The Inspiration Station, Part 1"
- 656: "The Inspiration Station, Part 2"
- 657: "Clutter"
- 658: "Game for a Mystery"
- 659: "Target of the Week"
- 660: "For the Birds"
- 661: "When You're Right, You're Right"
- 662: "Grandma's Visit"
- 663: "Finish What You..."
- 664: "The Jubilee Singers, Part 1"
- 665: "The Jubilee Singers, Part 2"
- 666: "The Jubilee Singers, Part 3"

52 - Cause and Effect (2010)

- 667: "The Mystery of the Clock Tower, Part 1"
- 668: "The Mystery of the Clock Tower, Part 2"
- 669: "Wooton's Broken Pencil Show"
- 670: "Stage Fright"
- 671: "Fast as I Can"
- 672: "Opposite Day"
- 673: "The Owlnapping"
- 674: "Square One"
- 675: "A Thankstaking Story"
- 676: "An Agreeable Nanny"
- 677: "The Malted Milkball Falcon"
- 678: "Grandma's Christmas Visit "

53 - The Green Ring Conspiracy (2011)

- 679: "The Green Ring Conspiracy, Part 1"
- 680: "The Green Ring Conspiracy, Part 2"
- 681: "The Green Ring Conspiracy, Part 3"
- 682: "The Green Ring Conspiracy, Part 4"
- 683: "The Green Ring Conspiracy, Part 5"
- 684: "The Green Ring Conspiracy, Part 6"
- 685: "The Green Ring Conspiracy, Part 7"
- 686: "The Green Ring Conspiracy, Part 8"
- 687: "The Green Ring Conspiracy, Part 9"
- 688: "The Green Ring Conspiracy, Part 10"
- 689: "The Green Ring Conspiracy, Part 11"
- 690: "The Green Ring Conspiracy, Part 12"

54 - Clanging Cymbals... and the Meaning of God's Love (2011)

- 691: "Wooton Knows Best"
- 692: "A Penny Saved"
- 693: "The Amazing Loser"
- 694: "Anger Mismanagement"
- 695: "Forgiving More...or Less"
- 696: "You're Two Kind"
- 697: "A Penny Earned"
- 698: "Never for Nothing"
- 699: "Emily the Genius"
- 700: "How to Sink a Sub"
- 701: "Unbecoming Jay"
- 702: "Childish Things"

55 - The Deep End (2012)

- 703: "The Labyrinth, Part 1"
- 704: "The Labyrinth, Part 2"
- 705: "The Labyrinth, Part 3"
- 706: "To Mend or Repair"
- 707: "Mistaken for Good"
- 708: "Sergeant York, Part 1"
- 709: "Sergeant York, Part 2"
- 710: "Sergeant York, Part 3"
- 711: "Sergeant York, Part 4"
- 712: "Child's Play"
- 713: "Something Old, Something New, Part 1"
- 714: "Something Old, Something New, Part 2"

56 - The Grand Design (2012)

- 715: "The Perfect Church, Part 1"
- 716: "The Perfect Church, Part 2"
- 717: "Great Expectations"
- 718: "For Three Dollars More"
- 719: "The Bible Network"
- 720: "Happy Hunting"
- 721: "The Holy Hoopster"
- 722: "The Lost Riddle"
- 723: "Groundhog Jay"
- 724: "Home Again, Part 1"
- 725: "Home Again, Part 2"
- 726: "Push the Red Button"

57 - A Call to Something More (2013)

- 727: "Your Servant is Listening, Part 1"
- 728: "Your Servant is Listening, Part 2"
- 729: "No Chemistry Whatsoever"
- 730: "The Friend Formula"
- 731: "More Than a Feeling"
- 732: "Repent After Me"
- 733: "Big Trouble Under the Big Top"
- 734: "Life Expectancy, Part 1"
- 735: "Life Expectancy, Part 2"
- 736: "Life Expectancy, Part 3"
- 737: "The Pilot, Part 1"
- 738: "The Pilot, Part 2"

57 1/2 - Club Season 1 (2014)

- 739: "The Launch, Part 1"
- 740: "The Launch, Part 2"
- 741: "In a Kingdom Far Away"
- 742: "Drake the Cosmic Copper"
- 743: "Mission: Unaccomplished, Part 1"
- 744: "Mission: Unaccomplished, Part 2"
- 745: "Like a Good Neighbor"
- 746: "The Lone Lawman"
- 747: "Thirty Jays Hath September"
- 748: "The Perfect Gift"
- 749: "The Drop Box"
- 750: "All By Myself"

58 - The Ties That Bind (2014)

- 751: "The Ties That Bind, Part 1"
- 752: "The Ties That Bind, Part 2"
- 753: "The Ties That Bind, Part 3"
- 754: "The Ties That Bind, Part 4"
- 755: "The Ties That Bind, Part 5"
- 756: "The Ties That Bind, Part 6"
- 757: "The Ties That Bind, Part 7"
- 758: "The Ties That Bind, Part 8"
- 759: "The Ties That Bind, Part 9"
- 760: "The Ties That Bind, Part 10"
- 761: "The Ties That Bind, Part 11"
- 762: "The Ties That Bind, Part 12"
- 763: "The Ties That Bind, Part 13"
- 764: "The Ties That Bind, Part 14"

58 1/2 - Club Season 2 (2015)

- 765: "Follow Me"
- 766: "The Cure, Part 1"
- 767: "The Cure, Part 2"
- 768: "The Cure, Part 3"
- 769: "B-TV: To Tell the Truth"
- 770: "To the Ends of the Earth"
- 771: "Pinocchio: The Tale of a Foolish Puppet, Part 1"
- 772: "Pinocchio: The Tale of a Foolish Puppet, Part 2"
- 773: "Hidden Gems"
- 774: "Walter's Flying Bus"
- 775: "Take It on Trust"
- 776: "A Daughter's Love"

59 - Taking the Plunge (2015)

- 777: "First Things First"
- 778: "Playing the Predictable"
- 779: "A Big Commitment"
- 780: "Dinner Roll Models"
- 781: "Out of the Woods"
- 782: "Let's Get Together"

60 - Head Over Heels (2015)

- 783: "Words From the Wise"
- 784: "Cycle of Fear"
- 785: "No Cause for Concern"
- 786: "The Case of the Ball Cap Hero"
- 787: "Between the Lines, Part 1"
- 788: "Between the Lines, Part 2"

60 1/2 - Club Season 3 (2016)

- 789: "The Journal of John Avery Whittaker"
- 790: "Walk This Way"
- 791: "When One Door Closes, Part 1"
- 792: "When One Door Closes, Part 2"
- 793: "The Good Soil"
- 794: "Things Not Seen"
- 795: "The Boat People, Part 1"
- 796: "The Boat People, Part 2"
- 797: "A Predicament of Biblical Proportions"
- 798: "A Forgiving Heart"
- 799: "Where Your Treasure Is"
- 800: "Un-Tech the Halls"

61 - Without a Hitch (2016)

- 801: "The Feud of Mason County"
- 802: "Parker for President"
- 803: "Old Tricks"
- 804: "The Key Suspect"
- 805: "A Very Bassett Wedding, Part 1"
- 806: "A Very Bassett Wedding, Part 2"

62 - Let's Put on a Show (2016)

- 807: "Connie the Counselor"
- 808: "No Friend Like an Old Friend"
- 809: "Fathers and Sons"
- 810: "The Grass is Always Greener"
- 811: "Legacy, Part 1"
- 812: "Legacy, Part 2"

62 1/2 - Club Season 4 (2017)

- 813: "One More Name, Part 1"
- 814: "One More Name, Part 2"
- 815: "One More Name, Part 3"
- 816: "A Perfect Testimony"
- 817: "Unfair Game"
- 818: "Swept Away, Part 1"
- 819: "Swept Away, Part 2"
- 820: "The Legend of Sperry McGerk"
- 821: "Angels in Horsehair"
- 822: "There and Back Again, Part 1"
- 823: "There and Back Again, Part 2a"
- 824: "There and Back Again, Part 2b"
- 825: "There and Back Again, Part 3"

63 - Up in the Air (2017)

- 826: "Find a Penny, Part 1"
- 827: "Find a Penny, Part 2"
- 828: "Friend or Foe"
- 829: "Have a Heart"
- 830: "B-TV: Revenge"
- 831: "Crash Course"

64 - Under the Surface (2017)

- 832: "Your Honest Opinion, Please"
- 833: "The Secret of the Writer's Ruse"
- 834: "Sir Buddy's Snowy Day"
- 835: "David and Absalom, Part 1"
- 836: "David and Absalom, Part 2"
- 837: "Out of the Picture"

64 1/2 - Club Season 5 (2018)

- 838: "Rewinding the Big Picture"
- 839: "Met His Match"
- 840: "Failing to the Finish Line"
- 841: "Drake and the Time That Time Forgot"
- 842: "Mean Streak"
- 843: "Always Do Your Best-ish"
- 844: "Charlotte"
- 845: "Walk Worthy"
- 846: "The Last Straw"
- 847: "Beyond Repair"
- 848: "The New Olivia"
- 849: "Out to Sea"

65 - Expect the Unexpected (2018)

- 850: "The Shame About Fame"
- 851: "The Sandwich Initiative"
- 852: "The Toy"
- 853: "The Good in People"
- 854: "Not What I Expected"
- 855: "Divided We Fall"

66 - Trial by Fire (2018)

- 856: "Much Ado About Jealousy"
- 857: "Same Mold Story"
- 858: "B-TV: Trinity"
- 859: "The Long End, Part 1"
- 860: "The Long End, Part 2"
- 861: "The Long End, Part 3"

66 1/2 - Club Season 6 (2019)

- 862: "In A Sun-Scorched Land, Part 1"
- 863: "In A Sun-Scorched Land, Part 2"
- 864: "Between Camp and a Hard Place, Part 1"
- 865: "Between Camp and a Hard Place, Part 2"
- 866: "Rumpelstiltskin: A Wee Little Tale"
- 867: "Take Every Thought Captive"
- 868: "All for the Guest"
- 869: "B-TV: Idolatry"
- 870: "The World of Whitonia"
- 871: "Icky and Kat and Balty and Bones"
- 872: "The Morning Star"
- 873: "Lifted Out of Context"

67 - More Than Meets the Eye (2019)

- 874: "Rightly Dividing"
- 875: "Man of the House"
- 876: "Page From the Playbook"
- 877: "A Sacrificial Escape"
- 878: "Nightmares By Constance, Part 1"
- 879: "Nightmares By Constance, Part 2"

68 - Out of the Blue (2019)

- 880: "Good Job!"
- 881: "Playing Favorites"
- 882: "A Wise Surprise"
- 883: "Breaking News"
- 884: "Always Home"
- 885: "Further from the Truth"

68 1/2 - Club Season 7 (2020)

- 886: "Unsinkable, Part 1"
- 887: "Unsinkable, Part 2"
- 888: "Out of Her Element"
- 889: "Young Whit and the Revolutionary Secret"
- 890: "Bridget, Redefined"
- 891: "Cars, Trains, and Motorcycles"
- 892: "Millstones"
- 893: "Badges of Honor"
- 894: "A Simple Reminder"
- 895: "The Martyr and the Rooster"
- 896: "The Forever Gift"
- 897: "Teach A Man"

69 - Best Kept Secrets (2020)

- 898: "The Rydell Revelations, Part 1"
- 899: "The Rydell Revelations, Part 2"
- 900: "The Rydell Revelations, Part 3"
- 901: "For A Song"
- 902: "California Dreams, Part 1"
- 903: "California Dreams, Part 2"

70 - Finding A Way (2021)

- 904: "Jumping Off, Jumping In"
- 905: "Auto Response"
- 906: "Unrelatable"
- 907: "The Protector"
- 908: "The Christmas Bells"
- 909: "Let's Call the Whole Thing Off"

70 1/2 - Club Season 8 (2021)

- 910: "If I Never Told You"
- 911: "Kopfkino: A Hare, A Hedgehog, and a Doof"
- 912: "The Clown Hero"
- 913: "Search For A Sunflower"
- 914: "Hurricane Perkins"
- 915: "The Revenge of Bigfoot"
- 916: "Voice of Freedom, Part 1"
- 917: "Voice of Freedom, Part 2"
- 918: "The Snow Must Go On"
- 919: "Sew On and Snow Forth"
- 920: "Snow 'Em Who's Boss"
- 921: "Make Snow Mistake"

71 - A Slippery Slope (2021)

- 922: "The Team"
- 923: "Please Adjust Your Frequency"
- 924: "Higher Than Our Ways
- 925: "Triple-Decker Sundae"
- 926: "Set A Watchman"
- 927: "Worth It"

72 - The Long Road Home (2022)

- 928: "The Lost One, Part 1"
- 929: "The Lost One, Part 2"
- 930: "Judge Me Tender"
- 931: "As Buck Would Have It, Part 1"
- 932: "As Buck Would Have It, Part 2"
- 933: "As Buck Would Have It, Part 3"

72 1/2 - Club Season 9 (2022)

- 934: "A Dickensian Dillemma"
- 935: "In For A Penny"
- 936: "Drake and the Aberrant Automaton"
- 937: "The Way of the Comic Book"
- 938: "Knox On Love"
- 939: "Results May Vary"
- 940: "Fishing For Gold"
- 941: "The Honor of Obed Edom"
- 942: "The 18-Yard Line"
- 943: "Showdown in San Poco"
- 944: "A Friend in Need"
- 945: "Knox On Sacrifice"

73 - 28 Hours (2022)

- 946: Morning
- 947: Afternoon
- 948: Evening
- 949: Dead of Night
- 950: Daybreak
- 951: Final Minutes

74 - Buckle Up! (2023)

- 952: Game Night
- 953: Renee Renewed
- 954: Legally Wooton
- 955: Value in the Process
- 956: Tough Call
- 957: King of My Heart

74 1/2 - Club Season 10, Part 1 (2023)

- 958: Reporting Live From Mount Sinai
- 959: Dose of Virtual Reality
- 960: The Jacobs Report: Robert Smalls
- 961: Survivor Boy
- 962: The Fast and the Ridiculous
- 963: Mile 151

75 - The Best Is Yet To Come (2023)

- 964: As Far As It Depends On Me
- 965: Two's Company, Four's A Crowd
- 966: The Best Is Yet To Come, Part 1
- 967: The Best Is Yet To Come, Part 2
- 968: The Best Is Yet To Come, Part 3
- 969: The Best Is Yet To Come, Part 4

75 1/2 - Club Season 10, Part 2 (2023)

- 970: Precious Lord, Part 1
- 971: Precious Lord, Part 2
- 972: Alibis
- 973: Extended Cut
- 974: The Show Must Go On (and On)
- 975: Naughty or Nice

76 - Keep It Together (2024)

- 976: The Rydell Realizations, Part 1
- 977: The Rydell Realizations, Part 2
- 978: The Rydell Realizations, Part 3
- 979: Right Notes, Wrong Key
- 980: Making An Honest Buck, Part 1
- 981: Making An Honest Buck, Part 2

76 1/2 - Club Season 11, Part 1 (2024)

- 982: The Ark's the Thing
- 983: One Last Treasure Hunt
- 984: Running the Race, Part 1
- 985: Running the Race, Part 2
- 986: Running the Race, Part 3
- 987: Quiet As A Smouse

77 - A New Perspective (2024)

- 988: The Heavens Declare
- 989: The Smouse Show
- 990: Painted Into A Corner
- 991: Making Nice
- 992: Unmanageable
- 993: Facing the Music

77 1/2 - Club Season 11, Part 2 (2024)

- 994: The Hero's Laundry
- 995: Worth Her Wage
- 996: Drake and the Heart Drive
- 997: You Dirty Rat
- 998: Express Salvation
- 999: Not the Same

78 - At Face Value (2025)

- 1000: Kris-crossed, Part 1
- 1001: Kris-crossed, Part 2
- 1002: Better Buck Next Time, Part 1
- 1003: Better Buck Next Time, Part 2
- 1004: Better Buck Next Time, Part 3
- 1005: My Hero Renee

78 1/2 - Club Season 12, Part 1 (2025)

- 1006: School of Hard Knocks
- 1007: Up His Sleeve
- 1008: Ambush
- 1009: Bottled Up
- 1010: The Difference
- 1011: The Picture Day Plot

79 - Eleventh Hour (2025)

- 1012: Crossing the Line, Part 1
- 1013: Crossing the Line, Part 2
- 1014: Just Another Day
- 1015: Two Steps Forward, Three Steps Back
- 1016: On the Edge, Part 1
- 1017: On the Edge, Part 2

79 1/2 - Club Season 12, Part 2 (2025)

- 1018: Keeping Score
- 1019: Put to the Test
- 1020: Aunt Vicki
- 1021: Out of the Spotlight
- 1022: Being Real
- 1023: The Smouse Family Christmas

80 - Rewritten (2026)

- 1024: Value of a Buck, Part 1
- 1025: Value of a Buck, Part 2
- 1026: Face the Future
- 1027: Face the Unknown
- 1028: Face the Truth
- 1029: This Is My Story

81 - Never A Dull Moment (2026)

- 1030: Knox On Money
- 1031: Now Hiring
- 1032: As Iron Sharpens Iron
- 1033: The Prodigal Twin, Part 1
- 1034: The Prodigal Twin, Part 2
- 1035: Word in the Hallway
- 1036: What's the Catch?
- 1037: A Quick Fix
- 1038: Accountability, Please
- 1039: The Great Yellowstone Heist

82 - Learning Curve (2026)

- 1040: The Measure of a Patriot, Part 1
- 1041: The Measure of a Patriot, Part 2
- 1042: You're In Good Hands
- 1043: Suggestion Box
- 1044: Babysitting Bassetts
- 1045: Teambuilding University

83 - Phase One (2026)

- 1046: Ready When You Are
- 1047: Fighting Back
- 1048: The Influencers
- 1049: Born For Adversity
- 1050: The Pen
- 1051: The Dais
- 1052: The Vault, Part 1
- 1053: The Vault, Part 2
- 1054: The Vault, Part 3

Unreleased episodes

- 085: "You Go to School Where?"
- 370: "Christmas Around the World, Part 1"
- 371: "Christmas Around the World, Part 2"
- 438b: "The Telltale Cat"
- 439: "BTV: Grace"
- 442b: "Sticks and Stones"
- 444a: "Career Moves"

== Gold Audio Series ==
The first 15 albums were originally released on audio cassette tape only. Starting in 2003, Focus on the Family updated and re-released those albums as part of the Gold Audio series. In the process, these albums, which were digitally remastered, were released on compact disc for the first time. Not only did these releases contained remastered episodes, but they also contained behind-the-scenes material from the cast and crew as bonus features. In addition, a number of episodes that never appeared in the original cassette albums made their debut in the discs.

As mentioned above, all episodes that originally contained Officer Harley have been replaced with edited versions of the original episodes or with other unrelated episodes, carrying over the changes first made in The Early Classics when it was released in 1992. The openings to many episodes have been removed or replaced, sometimes with newly recorded openings with Whit voiced by Paul Herlinger rather than Hal Smith. Other changes include the reordering of the episodes (or, in the case of albums 12 and 13, entire albums) to make the chronological listening experience more accurate, and the removal of references to cassettes at the end of multi-part episodes (e.g., "For the rest of the adventure, please turn over the tape."). The changes are most noticeable in the chronologically earliest albums, while albums 8 onwards feature comparatively fewer changes. Most albums were also renamed, by suggestions from listeners as well other means. Re-releases of these albums have dropped the Gold Audio label.

The sixteenth album, The Lost Episodes, contained an additional 100 episodes that were not included in any of the other Gold Audio releases. Most of these episodes were previously available as individual cassettes from Focus on the Family.

- 0: The Lost Episodes CD
- 1: The Adventure Begins: The Early Classics AC CD
- 2: Stormy Weather: and Other Grins, Grabbers & Great Getaways CD
- 3: Heroes: and Other Secrets, Surprises and Sensational Stories CD
- 4: FUN-damentals: Puns, Parables and Perilous Predicaments CD
- 5: Daring Deeds, Sinister Schemes CD
- 6: Mission: Accomplished CD
- 7: On Thin Ice CD
- 8: Beyond Expectations CD
- 9: Just in Time CD
- 10: Other Times . . . Other Places CD
- 11: It's Another Fine Day . . . CD
- 12: At Home and Abroad CD
- 13: It All Started When . . . CD
- 14: Meanwhile, In Another Part of Town
- 15: A Place of Wonder

=== Thematic albums ===
- Classics 1: Welcome to Odyssey AC CD
- Classics 2: A Maze of Mysteries
- Classics 3: Bible Eyewitness: Old Testament
- Classics 4: Bible Eyewitness: New Testament
- Classics 5: Comic Belief
- Classics 6: Star-Spangled Stories of American History
- Classics 7: Drive Time
- Chronicles, Kings & Crosses
- Passages: Fletcher's Rebellion
- Passages: Darien's Rise (2009)
- The Truth Chronicles (2009)
- More than Sundays
- Good Grief: God's Love in the Midst of Sorrow
- Christmas Classics
- AIO Life Lessons #1: Courage
- AIO Life Lessons #2: Humility
- AIO Life Lessons #3: Compassion
- AIO Life Lessons #4: Diligence
- AIO Life Lessons #5: Peer Pressure
- AIO Life Lessons #6: Perseverance
- AIO Life Lessons #7: Honesty
- AIO Life Lessons #8: Friendship
- AIO Life Lessons #9: Citizenship
- AIO Life Lessons #10: Excellence
- AIO Life Lessons #11: Respect
- AIO Life Lessons #12: Responsibility
- Eugene Sings!
- Eugene Sings! Christmas
- My Favorite Adventures

== Videos ==
AIO released a series of animated videos starting on September 24, 1991, and ending on June 3, 2003. Each are now available on both VHS and DVD formats, in English and Spanish.

=== Original Series (1991-1998) ===
Episode #	Title	Original airdate	Prod. code
1	"The Knight Travellers"	September 24, 1991	101
In this exciting story, Dylan, a young boy makes an unforgettable discovery about what truly important in life... but is it too late to stop Faustus from stealing the Imagination Station for his evil purpose?
2	"A Flight to the Finish"	October 29, 1991	102
3	"A Fine Feathered Frenzy"	November 3, 1992	103
4	"Shadow of a Doubt"	April 13, 1993	104
5	"Star Quest"	November 2, 1993	105
6	"Once Upon an Avalanche"	August 9, 1994	106
7	"Electric Christmas"	November 1, 1994	107
NOTE: This video was dedicated to the memory of Hal Smith.
8	"Go West, Young Man"	August 8, 1995	108
9	"Someone to Watch Over Me"	October 29, 1996	109
10	"In Harm's Way"	May 20, 1997	110
NOTE: This is the last episode distributed by Word Kids!.
11	"A Twist in Time"	October 7, 1997	111
NOTE: This is the first episode distributed by Tommy Nelson.
12	"A Stranger Among Us"	July 7, 1998	112
13	"Baby Daze"	TBA	113

=== The New Series (2000-2003) ===
The opening credit has been changed while the end credit remain the same for episodes 1, 2 and 4. This show contains four episodes.

Episode #	Title	Original airdate	Prod. code
14	"The Last Days of Eugene Meltsner"	September 12, 2000	114
15	"Escape from the Forbidden Matrix"	January 30, 2001	115
16	"The Caves of Qumran"	April 23, 2002	116
17	"Race to Freedom"	June 3, 2003	117

== Merchandise ==
=== Activity Packs ===
- 1: "I Want My BTV!"
- 2: "The Harlow Doyle Mystery Files"
- 3: "Lazarus, Come Forth!"
- 4: "Waylaid in the Windy City"
- 5: "Look Out, Lincoln"
- 6: "The Cross of Cortes"
- 7: "Family Vacation"
- 8: "Bernard and the Coat of Many Colors"
- 9: "A Thanksgiving Carol"
- 10: "The Star"
- 11: "Roll Away the Stone"
- 12: "Aloha, Oy!"
- 13: "Connie Goes to Camp"

==== Games ====
- At Whit's End
- The Imagination Station

==== DVD Games ====
- Answer That! - "Adventures in Odyssey" Edition

==== Computer programs ====
1. Adventures in Odyssey 3-D CD-ROM
2. Adventures in Odyssey Print Crafter Plus
3. Adventures in Odyssey and the Sword of the Spirit
4. Adventures in Odyssey and the Treasure of the Incas
5. Adventures in Odyssey and the Great Escape

==== Apparel ====
- Hats
- Shirts
- Jackets
- Aprons
- Shorts
- Beach Towel

==== Gear ====
- Keychains
- Wristbands
- Backpacks
- Flashlights
- Water Bottles
- Dog Tags
- Coin Purse
- Bible Covers
- Pencils and Pens
- Flash Drive
- Zipper Pull
- Eyeglasses
- Pins
- Lip Balm
- Adventures in Odyssey Club Patch
- Lunchboxes
- Pillows
- Blankets

==== Toys ====
- Action Figures
- Flying Discs
- Go West Young Man Pogs
- Balls
- Fidget Spinners
- Balloons
- Peel and Play
- Create-a-Scene
- Puzzles

==== Calendars ====
- 2002
- 2003
- 2002–2003
- 2004
- 2007
- 2008
- 2015
- 2016
- Advent Activity Calendar
- 2017

==== Resources ====
- Children's Ministry Resource Kit
- VBS Kits
- Awana at Home
- Booklets

==== Collectibles ====
- Go West Young Man Collector's Kit
- Video Collections
- Trading Cards
- Ornaments
- Organizer
- Diary
- Pencil Case
- Photo Album
- Bookmarks
- Magnets
- Posters
- Rubber Stamp Kit
- Stationery Pack
- Stickers
- Scrapbook
- Postcards
- Christmas Cards
- Chick-fil-A samplers
- Animation Cels
- Coaster
- Bookstore Decorations

== See also ==
- Adventures in Odyssey
- List of Adventures in Odyssey characters
