= Nathan Hoobler =

Nathan D. Hoobler
- Born: November 2, 1979 (age 47); Stoneboro, Pennsylvania, United States
- Occupations: Writer, producer, director
- Spouse: Tara Kelley Hoobler
- Children: 2

Nathan Hoobler (born November 2, 1979) is an American writer, director, and producer for the Focus on the Family-created radio drama, Adventures in Odyssey. Nathan grew up listening to Adventures in Odyssey and even started his own fansite about the show before being hired by Focus on the Family. He has a degree in Media Communication from Asbury College. In addition to his other roles, Nathan produced the bonus features for The Gold Audio Series, and has authored 2 books for the series as well.

== Career ==
In 1999, Nathan started the AIOHQ website and in the summer of 2000, got the opportunity to work with the Adventures in Odyssey team for a few months. For about a year and a half, he worked for the show on a freelance basis and wrote about five scripts. He became a full-time staff writer for Odyssey in January 2002, and has since written over 70 scripts, and directed over 50 episodes.

== Personal life ==
Originally from Pennsylvania, Nathan now lives in Colorado Springs with his wife Tara, and 2 sons.

== Books by Nathan Hoobler ==
- Adventures in Odyssey – The Official Guide 2008 – Tyndale House Pub, ISBN 1-58997-475-1
- Adventures in Odyssey – The Official Guide: 25th Birthday Edition 2012 – Tyndale House Pub, ISBN 1-58997-719-X

== Voice work ==
- Adventures in Odyssey: Additional Voices
