= List of DIC programs =

This is a list of programs produced and/or acquired by DIC Entertainment. Much of DIC's catalogue is currently owned by WildBrain, the successor in interest to Cookie Jar Group (which acquired DIC in 2008).

In 1990, DIC signed an international distribution deal with the Italian studio Silvio Berlusconi Communications, covering five or six series. In 2006, DIC reclaimed the international distribution rights to 20 of its series from The Walt Disney Company.

== Animated TV series ==
=== DIC Audiovisuel ===
Title	Year(s)	Network	Co-production with	Notes
Les Aventures de l'Energie; The Adventures of Energy	1975	TF1	Sodel, Vidéograms from France, Gédéon/Compagnie	Owned by The Walt Disney Company
Cro et Bronto; Cro and Bronto	1978–80	Antenne 2		Owned by The Walt Disney Company
Les Aventures de Plume d'Elan; The Adventures of Elk Feather	1979–81	TF1	Belokapi	
Archibald the Magician	1980–81	TF1	French Committee for Health Education	Owned by The Walt Disney Company
Beulebeul Ermite; Beulebeul	1980	Antenne 2		Owned by The Walt Disney Company
Ulysses 31	1981–82	FR3; RTL Télé Luxembourg	Tokyo Movie Shinsha	WildBrain's ownership of the series reverted back to creators (Note: Excludes Japan (which was owned by WildBrain CPLG and TMS Entertainment Europe).)
Lupin VIII	1982	N/A	Tokyo Movie Shinsha	Failed pilot
The Mysterious Cities of Gold	1982–83	Antenne 2 NHK General TV; RTL Télévision	MK Company, NHK, CLT-UFA	Currently owned by Movie Plus Group with Studio TF1 Distribution handling distribution
The Get Along Gang	1984	CBS	American Greetings	Pilot was made by Nelvana
Jayce and the Wheeled Warriors	1985	Syndication		

=== DIC Enterprises ===
Title	Year(s)	Network	Co-production with	Notes
Inspector Gadget	1983–85	Syndication; FR3	LBS Communications, Nelvana (Season 1) & Field Communications (Season 1)	Season 1 was produced by DIC Audiovisuel.
The Littles	1983–85	ABC	ABC Entertainment	Season 1 was produced by DIC Audiovisuel.
Wolf Rock TV	1984	ABC	Dick Clark Productions	
Kidd Video	1984–85	NBC	Saban Productions	Owned by The Walt Disney Company
Pole Position	1984	CBS	MK Company	
Rainbow Brite	1984–86	Syndication	Hallmark Cards & LBS Communications	Co-owned with Hallmark Cards
Heathcliff and the Catillac Cats	1984–85	Syndication; FR3	McNaught Syndicate, LBS Communications, ICC TV Productions (Season 1), Chris-Craft Television (Season 2), United Entertainment Group (Season 2)	Season 1 was produced by DIC Audiovisuel.
Care Bears	1985	Syndication	American Greetings, LBS Communications	Co-owned with Cloudco Entertainment
Hulk Hogan's Rock 'n' Wrestling	1985–86	CBS	World Wrestling Federation	Owned by WWE
M.A.S.K.	1985–86	Syndication	LBS Communications, Ashi Productions, KK C&D Asia	Season 1 was produced by DIC Audiovisuel Season 1 co-owned with Hasbro, Season 2 fully owned by WildBrain
Popples	1986–87	Syndication (Kideo TV)	American Greetings	Co-owned with Hasbro
The Real Ghostbusters	1986–91	ABC	Columbia Pictures Television, Coca-Cola Telecommunications	Owned by Sony Pictures Television
The Adventures of Teddy Ruxpin	1986–87	Syndication	Atkinson Film-Arts	Distributed by Henson Independent Properties under license from Alchemy II

=== DIC Animation City ===
Title	Year(s)	Network	Co-production with	Notes
Kissyfur	1986–88	NBC	NBC Productions, Saban Productions (Season 2)	Season 1 was produced by DIC Enterprises Owned by NBCUniversal
Dennis the Menace	1986–88	Syndication	General Mills, Crawleys Animation (Season 2)	Season 1 was produced by DIC Audiovisuel
Lady Lovely Locks	1987	Syndication (Kideo TV)	American Greetings, Tatsunoko Production	
Beverly Hills Teens	1987	Syndication		
ALF: The Animated Series	1987–88	NBC	Alien Productions, Saban Entertainment	Distributed by Shout! Studios under license from Alien Productions
Dinosaucers	1987	Syndication	Coca-Cola Telecommunications	Owned by Sony Pictures Television
Hello Kitty's Furry Tale Theater	1987	CBS	Sanrio, MGM/UA Television	Owned by Amazon MGM Studios under license from Sanrio
The New Archies	1987	NBC	Archie Comics (credited as Riverdale Productions), Saban Productions	
Starcom: The U.S. Space Force	1987	Syndication	Coca-Cola Telecommunications	
Sylvanian Families	1987	Syndication	Coca-Cola Telecommunications	
The New Adventures of Beany and Cecil	1988	ABC	Bob Clampett Productions	Owned by the estate of Bob Clampett
COPS	1988	Syndication		
ALF Tales	1988–89	NBC	Alien Productions, Saban Entertainment	Distributed by Shout! Studios under license from Alien Productions
The Chipmunks	1988–90	NBC	Bagdasarian Productions	Seasons 6–8 only; owned by Bagdasarian Productions
Ring Raiders	1989	Syndication	Those Characters from Cleveland	Rights owned by EMBA Media Associates with distribution through 41 Entertainment
The Karate Kid	1989	NBC	Columbia Pictures Television	Owned by Sony Pictures Television
Camp Candy	1989–92	NBC; Syndication	Saban Entertainment	Seasons 1–2 only; owned by The Walt Disney Company
The Super Mario Bros. Super Show!	1989	Syndication	Nintendo of America, Saban Entertainment, Viacom	
The Legend of Zelda	1989	Syndication	Nintendo of America, Saban Entertainment, Viacom	Aired as part of The Super Mario Bros. Super Show!
Captain N: The Game Master	1989–91	NBC	Nintendo of America, Saban Entertainment	
G.I. Joe: A Real American Hero	1989–91	Syndication	Claster Television	Owned by Hasbro
Maxie's World	1989	Syndication	Claster Television	
The Wizard of Oz	1990	ABC	Turner Entertainment Co.	
The Adventures of Super Mario Bros. 3	1990	NBC; Italia 1	Nintendo of America, Reteitalia S.p.A.	
Zak Tales	1990			
Captain Planet and the Planeteers	1990–92	TBS	Turner Program Services	Seasons 1–3 only; owned by Warner Bros. Entertainment
New Kids on the Block	1990–91	ABC		Owned by the vocal group of the same name
Swamp Thing	1990–91	Fox	Batfilm Productions, DC Comics	
Captain Zed and the Zee Zone	1991	Children's ITV	Tony Collingwood Productions Limited, Scottish Television Enterprises	Owned by Mattel
Chip & Pepper's Cartoon Madness	1991	NBC	Rainforest Entertainment	Co-owned with NBCUniversal; out of circulation since 1992 due to legal issues with third-party cartoons featured
Hammerman	1991	ABC	Bustin' Productions, Inc., Reteitalia S.p.A., Telecinco	Owned by BMG Rights Management
Super Mario World	1991	NBC; Italia 1 Telecinco	Nintendo of America, Reteitalia S.p.A., Telecinco	
Where's Waldo?	1991	CBS; ITV	The Waldo Film Company	Owned by Mattel; did not produce the 1992 direct-to-video specials
Wish Kid	1991	NBC	Reteitalia S.p.A., Telecinco	Season 2 was planned before it was canceled for several reasons
ProStars	1991	NBC	Reteitalia S.p.A., Telecinco	(Note: Michael Jordan, Bo Jackson, and Wayne Gretzky are trademarked by themselves. Sports footage is owned by the National Basketball Association, Major League Baseball, and National Hockey League.)
Bill and Ted's Excellent Adventures	1991	Fox	Orion Television Entertainment, Nelson Entertainment	Season 2 only; owned by Amazon MGM Studios
Super Dave: Daredevil for Hire	1992	Fox	Reteitalia S.p.A., Telecinco, Blye-Einstein Productions	
Stunt Dawgs	1992–93	Syndication	Franklin/Waterman Productions, Rainforest Entertainment, Claster Television	Owned by Sony Pictures Television
The All-New Dennis the Menace	1993	CBS	General Mills, Reteitalia S.p.A., Telecinco	
Adventures of Sonic the Hedgehog	1993	Syndication; Italia 1 Telecinco	Sega of America, Bohbot Entertainment, Reteitalia S.p.A., Telecinco	North American rights co-owned with EMBA Media Associates with distribution through 41 Entertainment

=== DIC Entertainment / DIC Productions ===
Title	Year(s)	Network	Co-production with	Notes
Sonic the Hedgehog	1993–94	ABC; Italia 1 Telecinco	Sega of America, Reteitalia S.p.A., Telecinco	Season 3 was planned before it was canceled by ABC
Madeline	1993–2001	The Family Channel; ABC; Disney Channel		
Hurricanes	1993–97	Syndication; Scottish Television	Scottish Television Enterprises, Siriol Productions	UK/Ireland rights owned by STV Studios
Double Dragon	1993–94	Syndication (Amazin' Adventures); Italia 1 Telecinco	Bohbot Entertainment, Tradewest Inc., Reteitalia S.p.A., Telecinco	North American rights co-owned with EMBA Media Associates with distribution through 41 Entertainment
Street Sharks	1994–97	Syndication (Amazin' Adventures)	Bohbot Entertainment	North American rights co-owned with EMBA Media Associates with distribution through 41 Entertainment
Where on Earth Is Carmen Sandiego?	1994–99	Fox	Broderbund	
Ultraforce	1994	Syndication (Amazin' Adventures II)	Bohbot Entertainment	Owned by EMBA Media Associates with distribution through 41 Entertainment
Action Man	1995–96	Syndication (Amazin' Adventures II)	Bohbot Entertainment	
Gadget Boy & Heather	1995–96	Syndication (Amazin' Adventures II); M6	France Animation, M6	European distribution rights owned by Groupe M6
What-a-Mess	1995–96	ABC	Link Entertainment	
Sailor Moon	1995–98	Syndication; Cartoon Network	Optimum Productions, General Mills (Note: Originally produced by Toei Animation, Toei Advertising and TV Asahi.)	English dub of first 82 episodes, later episodes were dubbed and distributed by Cloverway. Rights have reverted to Toei Animation, with a new dub produced by Viz Media.
Siegfried & Roy: Masters of the Impossible	1996	Fox		
Inspector Gadget's Field Trip	1996–98	The History Channel		
Gadget Boy's Adventures in History	1997–98	The History Channel	France Animation, M6	
Mummies Alive!	1997	Syndication	Northern Lights Entertainment	
The Wacky World of Tex Avery	1997	Syndication; M6	Les Studios Tex, Telecima, M6	
Extreme Dinosaurs	1997	Syndication (BKN)	Bohbot Entertainment	Rights owned by EMBA Media Associates with distribution through 41 Entertainment
Pocket Dragon Adventures	1997	Syndication (BKN)	D'Ocon Films Productions, Bohbot Entertainment	Rights owned by EMBA Media Associates with distribution through 41 Entertainment
Sonic Underground	1999	TF1; Syndication (BKN)	Sega of America, Les Studios Tex	
Sherlock Holmes in the 22nd Century	1999–2001	Fox; Scottish Television	Scottish Television Enterprises	UK/Ireland rights owned by STV Studios
Sabrina: The Animated Series	1999	UPN; ABC	Savage Studios Ltd., Hartbreak Films, Archie Comics (credited as Riverdale Productions)	
Archie's Weird Mysteries	1999–2000	PAX; M6	Les Studios Tex, Archie Comics (credited as Riverdale Productions)	
Mary-Kate and Ashley in Action!	2001–02	ABC	Dualstar Animation	Owned by Dualstar
Alienators: Evolution Continues	2001–02	Fox	The Montecito Picture Company, Dentsu, Columbia TriStar Television, DreamWorks Television	
Super Duper Sumos	2001 (2002–03 in US)	Nickelodeon	Ameko Entertainment	
Speed Racer X	2002	Nickelodeon; Nick GAS	Tatsunoko Production, Speed Racer Enterprises (Note: Originally produced by Tatsunoko Production, Yomiko Advertising and TV Tokyo.)	English dub; owned by Tatsunoko Production
Liberty's Kids	2002–03	PBS (PBS Kids)	Melusine Productions, WHYY	
Stargate Infinity	2002–03	Fox (FoxBox); Disney Channel France; M6	Les Studios Tex, MGM Television Entertainment	International rights owned by Amazon MGM Studios
Gadget & the Gadgetinis	2002–03	Fox Kids Europe; M6; Channel 5	SIP Animation, ABC Family Properties, Fox Kids Europe N.V., Fox Kids International Programming, M6, Channel 5 and Mediatrade S.P.A.	Non-U.S. rights owned by Fox Kids/Jetix Europe until early-2010s
Sabrina's Secret Life	2003–04	Syndication (DIC Kids Network)	Les Studios Tex, Archie Comics (credited as Riverdale Productions)	
Knights of the Zodiac	2003–04	Cartoon Network	Kaleidoscope Entertainment (Note: Originally produced by Toei Animation and TV Asahi.)	English dub; owned by Toei Animation
Strawberry Shortcake	2003–08	Direct-to-video; HBO Family	American Greetings	Initially released as a direct-to-video series
Trollz	2005	Syndication (DIC Kids Network)	Studio DAM	
Horseland	2006–08	CBS (KOL Secret Slumber Party/KEWLopolis)	Horseland LLC and KOL/AOL for Kids	
Sushi Pack	2007–09	CBS (KEWLopolis)	American Greetings and SD Entertainment	North American rights co-owned with Cloudco Entertainment
DinoSquad	2007–08	CBS (KEWLopolis)		

== Live-action TV series ==
=== DIC Enterprises ===
Title	Year(s)	Network	Co-production with	Notes
Botts	1986–87	TF1	SFP	Produced by DIC Audiovisuel; owned by The Walt Disney Company

=== DIC Animation City ===
Title	Year(s)	Network	Co-production with	Notes
Zoobilee Zoo	1986-87	Syndication	Hallmark Cards, BRB Productions & SFM Entertainment	Distributed by SFM Entertainment under license from Hallmark Cards
La Lucarne d'Amilcar	1987–89	RTL Lëtzebuerg; M6		Produced by DIC Audiovisuel; owned by The Walt Disney Company
I'm Telling!	1987–88	NBC	Saban Entertainment	Owned by The Walt Disney Company
Photon	1987	Syndication	SFM Entertainment	
The Hitchhiker	1987–1992	HBO (Season 4); USA Networks (Season 5-6)	Markowitz Chester Producing; HBO	Owned by Skydance Corporation
Hey Vern, It's Ernest!	1988	CBS	Emshell Producers Group	
Record Breakers	1989	Syndication		
Pepe Plata	1990	Univision		

=== DIC Entertainment / DIC Productions ===
Title	Year(s)	Network	Co-production with	Notes
Superhuman Samurai Syber-Squad	1994–95	Syndication	Tsuburaya Productions, Ultracom, All American Television	
Tattooed Teenage Alien Fighters from Beverly Hills	1994–95	USA Network		
Old MacDonald's Sing-a-Long Farm	1994–95	Lifetime		
Rimba's Island	1994–96	Fox		Disney's rights to the series expired in 2006
Cake	2006	CBS (KOL Secret Slumber Party)	Brookwell McNamara Entertainment, KOL/AOL for Kids	
Dance Revolution	2006–07	CBS (KOL Secret Slumber Party)	Brookwell McNamara Entertainment, Konami Digital Entertainment, Inc., KOL/AOL for Kids	

== Specials ==
- Poochie (1984)
- Robotman & Friends (1985) (co-production with United Media Productions and LBS Communications)
- The Kingdom Chums: Little David's Adventure (1986) (co-production with Diana Kerew Productions)
- Barbie and the Rockers: Out of This World (September 1987) (co-production with Mattel)
  - Barbie and the Sensations: Rockin' Back to Earth (September 1987) (co-production with Mattel)
- Meet Julie (1987)
- Madeline (1988)
  - Madeline's Christmas (1990)
  - Madeline and the Bad Hat (1991)
  - Madeline and the Gypsies (1991)
  - Madeline's Rescue (1991)
  - Madeline in London (1991)
- Little Golden Book Land (1989) (co-production with Western Publishing)
- Elves of the Forest (1990) (combined episodes to make a film called A Christmas Adventure; co-distributed with Saban Entertainment)
- Battletoads (1992)
- Defenders of Dynatron City (1992)
- Hulk Hogan: All-Time Champ (1992)
- Super Trolls (1992) (co-produced with Bohbot Entertainment)
- Inspector Gadget Saves Christmas (1992)
- A Hollywood Hounds Christmas (1994)
- Legend of the Hawaiian Slammers (1994)
- Jingle Bell Rock (1995)
- Twas the Night Before Bumpy (1995)
- Sonic Christmas Blast (1996) (co-production with Sega of America)

== Films ==
Title	Year(s)	Co-production with	Format	Distributor/Broadcaster	Notes
Here Come the Littles	1985	American Broadcasting Company	Theatrical	Atlantic Releasing Corporation	Produced by DIC Audiovisuel
Rainbow Brite and the Star Stealer	1985	Hallmark Cards	Theatrical	Warner Bros.	Produced by DIC Audiovisuel
Heathcliff: The Movie	1986	LBS Communications	Theatrical	Clubhouse Pictures	Produced by DIC Audiovisuel (Note: Edited from two or more TV episodes, with new wrap-around animation running ca. 5–25% of the film's total runtime.)
Liberty and the Littles	1986	American Broadcasting Company	Television	ABC	Produced by DIC Audiovisuel; Later aired as a multi-part TV episode
Liberty	1986	Robert Greenwald Productions	Television	NBC	Live-action film
Les Dossiers secrets de l'inspecteur Gadget	1987	N/A	Theatrical	Artédis	(Note: Released only in France.)
Dennis the Menace	1987	Coca-Cola Telecommunications	Television	Syndication	Live-action film, retitled Dennis the Menace: Dinosaur Hunter in subsequent releases
Dennis the Menace: Memory Mayhem	1987	General Mills	Direct-to-video	Playhouse Video (CBS/Fox Video)	
Dennis the Menace: The Mitchell's Move	1987	General Mills	Direct-to-video	Playhouse Video (CBS/Fox Video)	
Dennis the Menace: Dennis the Movie Star	1987	General Mills	Direct-to-video	Playhouse Video (CBS/Fox Video)	
M.A.S.K.: The Movie	1988	N/A	Direct-to-video	MSD Video (Tempo DIC Video)	(Note: Released on home video only in the United Kingdom.)
Sylvanian Families: The Movie	1989	N/A	Direct-to-video	MSD Video (Tempo DIC Video)	
Starcom: The Movie	1989	N/A	Direct-to-video	MSD Video (Tempo DIC Video)	
The Inspector Gadget Movie: Go Gadget	1989	N/A	Direct-to-video	MSD Video (Tempo DIC Video)	
The Heathcliff Movie: Heathcliff and Me	1989	N/A	Direct-to-video	MSD Video (Tempo DIC Video)	
M.A.S.K.: The Movie II	1990	N/A	Direct-to-video	MSD Video (Tempo DIC Video)	
Archie: To Riverdale and Back Again	1990	Riverdale Productions; Kent/QMA; Patchett Kaufman Entertainment	Television	NBC	Live-action film
Adventures of Sonic the Hedgehog: The Quest for the Chaos Emeralds	1994	Bohbot Entertainment	Direct-to-video	Abbey Home Entertainment (Tempo Video)	
Double Dragon: The Shield of the Shadow Khan	1994	Bohbot Entertainment	Direct-to-video	Buena Vista Home Video (DIC Toon-Time Video)	(Note: Released on home video only in the United States and Canada.)
Street Sharks: The Gene Slamming Begins	1994	Bohbot Entertainment	Direct-to-video	Buena Vista Home Video	
A Christmas Carol	1997	N/A	Direct-to-video	20th Century Fox Home Entertainment	
The Adventures of Snowden	1997	Dayton-Hudson Corporation	Direct-to-video	20th Century Fox Home Entertainment	Sold exclusively in Target stores
Mummies Alive! The Legend Begins	1997	Northern Lights Entertainment	Direct-to-video	Buena Vista Home Entertainment (DIC Toon-Time Video)	(Note: Despite the name, the US release contains the "Family Feud" episodes: "Brother's Helper", "New Mummy in Town" and "The Heart's Arrow", although when originally planned the tape was meant to be released with the episodes "Ra, Ra, Ra, Ra", "Sleep Walk Like An Egyptian" and "The Gift of Geb", which is how it was when the tape was released in Spain.)
Meet the Deedles	1998	Walt Disney Pictures; Peak Productions	Theatrical	Buena Vista Pictures	Live-action
Our Friend, Martin	1999	Intellectual Properties Worldwide	Direct-to-video	20th Century Fox Home Entertainment	
Inspector Gadget	1999	Walt Disney Pictures; Caravan Pictures; The Kerner Entertainment Company	Theatrical	Buena Vista Pictures	Live-action
Genius	1999	N/A	Television	Disney Channel	Live-action
Madeline: Lost in Paris	1999	N/A	Direct-to-video	Buena Vista Home Entertainment (Walt Disney Home Video)	
Inspector Gadget: Gadget's Greatest Gadgets	2000	N/A	Direct-to-video	Buena Vista Home Entertainment (DIC Toon-Time Video)	
Monster Mash	2000	RAI Radiotelevisione Italiana	Direct-to-video	Universal Studios Home Video; RAI Trade	
Archie's Weird Mysteries: Archie and the Riverdale Vampires	2000	Les Studios Tex; Metropole Television; Arles Animation; Les Studios de Saint Ouen	Direct-to-video	Universal Studios Home Video; RAI Trade	
Sing-a-Long with Madeline and her Friends	2001	N/A	Direct-to-video	Lions Gate Home Entertainment	
Evolution: The Animated Movie	2002	N/A	Direct-to-video	Lions Gate Home Entertainment	
Sing-a-Long Around the World with Madeline	2002	N/A	Direct-to-video	Lions Gate Home Entertainment	
Inspector Gadget's Last Case	2002	N/A	Television	Nickelodeon	Part of the DIC Movie Toons lineup
Sabrina: Friends Forever	2002	N/A	Television	Nickelodeon	Part of the DIC Movie Toons lineup
Time Kid	2002	N/A	Television	Nickelodeon	Part of the DIC Movie Toons lineup
Dennis the Menace: Cruise Control	2002	N/A	Television	Nickelodeon	Part of the DIC Movie Toons lineup
The Archies in JugMan	2002	N/A	Television	Nickelodeon	Part of the DIC Movie Toons lineup
Dinosaur Island	2002	N/A	Television	Nickelodeon	Part of the DIC Movie Toons lineup
My Fair Madeline	2002	N/A	Television	Nickelodeon	Part of the DIC Movie Toons lineup
Groove Squad	2002	N/A	Television	Nickelodeon	Part of the DIC Movie Toons lineup
Treasure Island	2002	N/A	Television	Nickelodeon	Part of the DIC Movie Toons lineup
Globehunters: An Around the World in 80 Days Adventure	2002	Nickelodeon Animation Studio; Frederator Studios	Television	Nickelodeon	Part of the DIC Movie Toons lineup
The Amazing Zorro	2002	N/A	Television	Nickelodeon	Part of the DIC Movie Toons lineup
20,000 Leagues Under The Sea	2002	N/A	Television	Nickelodeon	Part of the DIC Movie Toons lineup
Inspector Gadget's Biggest Caper Ever	2005	Mainframe Entertainment	Direct-to-video	Lions Gate Home Entertainment; Mainframe Entertainment	Computer-animated film
Madeline in Tahiti	2005	N/A	Direct-to-video	N/A (unreleased in the US)	
Trollz: Best Friends for Life - The Movie	2005	N/A	Television/Direct-to-video	Disney Channel/Warner Home Video	
Trollz: Magic of the Five - The Movie	2005	N/A	Direct-to-video	Warner Home Video	
McKids Adventures: Get Up and Go with Ronald	2006	McDonald's; KanDoKid Films; Brookwell McNamara Entertainment	Direct-to-video	Warner Home Video	Live-action featurette
McKids Adventures: Treasure Hunt with Ronald	2006	McDonald's; KanDoKid Films; Brookwell McNamara Entertainment	Direct-to-video	Warner Home Video	Live-action featurette
Strawberry Shortcake: The Sweet Dreams Movie	2006	American Greetings	Theatrical	Kidtoon Films	Computer-animated Film
Iz and the Zizzles	2006	N/A	Direct-to-video	20th Century Fox Home Entertainment	
Iz and the Zizzles: Will the Zizzles Sizzle or Fizzle?	2006	N/A	Television	KidsCo	Never shown in the United States, unknown to have aired or shown on anything aside from KidsCo
Trollz: Hair Over Heels - The Movie	2007	N/A	Direct-to-video	NCircle Entertainment	Originally produced in 2005, intended for a 2006 release

== ABC Entertainment/Greengrass Productions ==
DIC Entertainment acquired the rights to certain animated series and specials produced by ABC and its subsidiary Greengrass Productions following its spin off from Disney in 2000.

=== Series ===
Title	Years	Network	Co-production with	Notes
The Little Clowns of Happytown	1987-1988	ABC	Marvel Productions; Murakami Wolf Swenson	
Wild West C.O.W.-Boys of Moo Mesa	1992-1993	ABC	King World Productions; Gunther-Wahl Productions (season 1); Ruby-Spears Productions (season 2)	IP rights currently owned by The Nacelle Company
Bump in the Night	1994-1996	ABC	Danger Productions	

=== Specials ===
- The Magic Flute (1994) (produced by Ruby-Spears Productions, Greengrass Productions, and ABC Entertainment)
- The Secret Garden (1994) (produced by Mike Young Productions, Greengrass Productions, and ABC Entertainment)

== Canceled/unmaterialized shows ==
- Gadget Girl (1992)
- GI Gadget (1999)
- Camp Jake (2000)
- Salem (2000)
- Josie and the Pussycats (2001)
- The Adventures of Who Wants to Be a Millionaire? - The Animated Series (2001)
- Stan Lee's Secret Super Six (2003)
- Secret Millionaire's Club (2006)
- Untitled Inspector Gadget reboot series (2008)
