= Madeline (book series) =

Book series by Ludwig Bemelmans

- Madeline; Madeline's Rescue; Madeline and the Bad Hat; Madeline in London; Madeline and the Gypsies; Madeline's Christmas; Madeline in America and Other Holiday Tales; Madeline Loves Animals; Madeline Says Merci; Madeline and the Cats of Rome; Madeline at the White House; Madeline and the Old House in Paris
- Author: Ludwig Bemelmans and John Bemelmans Marciano
- Country: United States
- Language: English
- Genre: Children's literature
- Publisher: Viking Press
- Media type: Print (hardcover and paperback)

Madeline is a book series, part of the Madeline media franchise, originally created by Ludwig Bemelmans. The series follows the daily adventures of Madeline, a 7-year-old girl attending a boarding school in Paris, Europe with eleven other girls, under the care of their teacher, Miss Clavel.

The first book was published in 1939, and proved to be a success, so Bemelmans wrote many sequels in the 1940s-50s. The series continued, written by Bemelmans' grandson John Bemelmans Marciano. As of 1998, the series had sold over 15 million copies worldwide. Since then, the books have also been made into a film, a short film, and an animated series produced by DIC (now WildBrain).

== Series summary ==
Each book in the series begins with the rhyme:

In an old house in Paris
That was covered in vines
Lived twelve little girls
In two straight lines.

Madeline is the smallest yet bravest of the twelve girls at the boarding school. She is only 7 years old and is the only redheaded student in the school. She has many adventures while there, including falling off a bridge and being saved by a stray dog, and meeting Pepito, the mischievous Spaniard boy next door.

== Books ==
The original series by Ludwig Bemelmans consists of six books:

- Madeline (1939) - Madeline gets appendicitis and must go to a hospital to have her appendix removed.
- Madeline's Rescue (1953) - Madeline falls off a bridge and is rescued by a stray dog, who joins her school. Winner of the 1954 Caldecott Medal.
- Madeline and the Bad Hat (1956) - The Spanish Ambassador moves in next door, and Madeline instinctively realizes that his son Pepito is mean and spoiled.
- Madeline's Christmas (1956) - Madeline celebrates Christmas with her friends.
- Madeline and the Gypsies (1959) - Madeline and Pepito run away to join a group of traveling gypsies.
- Madeline in London (1961) - Madeline visits Pepito, who moved to London, Britain.

The first five in the series were recorded as audiobooks narrated by the late Carol Channing, originally released on LP by Caedmon Records and later released on audio cassettes:

- Madeline and Other Bemelmans Told by Carol Channing [TC 1113], including Madeline, Madeline's Rescue and Madeline and the Bad Hat
- Madeline and the Gypsies [TC 1304]), including Madeline and the Gypsies and Madeline in London

The new series by John Bemelmans Marciano consists of the following books:

- Madeline in America and Other Holiday Tales - Madeline travels to the Southern US state of Texas.
- Madeline Loves Animals - Madeline travels to the city's zoo and meets the animals.
- Madeline Says Merci - Madeline learns how to be polite.
- Madeline and the Cats of Rome - Madeline and her classmates travel to Rome (Italy) in spring.
- Madeline at the White House - Madeline and her classmates visit the White House in Washington, DC.
- Madeline and the Old House in Paris - Madeline and Pepito encounter a ghost in the old house in Paris.

== Characters ==
- Madeline Fogg: The smallest of the girls and the title character, she is 7 (later 8) years old, and she is the only redheaded student of the class. She had her appendix removed in the first story. She is known for being the bravest and most outgoing of the girls. Contrary to popular belief, and to her depiction in the animated series and in the live-action film, she, and by addition, her classmates, weren't orphans in the original books, and were attending a Catholic boarding school. This is further reinforced in the first book wherein she received a dollhouse from her father (whose surname is revealed to be Fogg in Madeline in America and Other Holiday Tales). Voiced by Andrea Libman (animated). Played by Hatty Jones (live-action).
- Miss Clavel: Madeline's teacher and minder, she is commonly believed to be a Catholic nun due to her general appearance, but her attire in Bemelmans' illustrations is actually that of a nurse. The fact that she is not a nun is also evidenced by the fact that she is not called "Sister" or "Mother". She is always trying to keep Madeline out of trouble. Voiced by Stevie Vallance (animated). Played by Frances McDormand (live-action).
- Pepito: The Spanish Ambassador's son, who is about Madeline's age; he lives next door to the girls. For a time, he was constantly bullying the girls and being cruel to animals, but he changed his ways after one of his cruel tricks backfired. Due to his bratty type and the distinctive hat that he constantly wore, he was called "The Bad Hat" by the girls. He stopped wearing the hat after he befriended the girls. Voiced by David Morse (animated). Played by Kristian De La Osa (live-action).
- Lord Cucuface: Chairman of the school's board of trustees, he initially ordered the absence of the dog Genevieve, but had a change of affection after receiving one of her puppies. He is known as "Lord Covington" in the live-action film due to his name became nonsense. Voiced by French Tickner (animated). Played by Nigel Hawthorne (live-action).
- Genevieve: The girls' anthropomorphic dog, she is extremely intelligent, possessing skills such as juggling and arithmetic, and is beloved by Madeline and her friends. She was a stray until she saved Madeline from drowning.
- Students at the school: The other girls who attend the boarding school with Madeline. All of the girls were initially nameless in the book series, while all were given names in the animated television series. The girls are close to one another and treat each other as family.
  - Chloe: Long strawberry blonde hair. Voiced by Tara Strong in the animated television series.
  - Nicole: Short dirty blonde hair and fair skin. Voiced by Veronika Sztopa in the animated television series.
  - Danielle: Curly brown hair and fair skin. Voiced by Chantal Strand in the animated television series.
  - Yvette: Very short curly blonde hair. Voiced by Tabitha St. Germain in the animated television series.
  - Nona: Long black hair and tan skin. Voiced by Ashleigh Ball in the animated television series.
  - Lulu: Short black hair and tan skin. Voiced by Erin Mathews in the animated television series.
  - Anne: Long brown wavy hair and medium skin. Voiced by Kelly Sheridan in the animated television series.
  - Ellie: Black short hair and dark skin. Voiced by Ashleigh Ball in the animated television series.
  - Monique: Long brown hair in a flip and fair skin. Voiced by Britt McKillip in the animated television series.
  - Janine: Dark brown curly hair and medium skin. Voiced by Alyson Court in the animated television series.
  - Sylvie/Simone: Long light brown hair and fair skin.
- Mrs. Murphy: The housekeeper, owner and maid of Madeline's boarding school.
- Sugar Dimples: The youngest-ever movie star with famous blonde curls. She is the girls' best friend and loves Madeline. She is a parody of former child star Shirley Temple.
- Giselle: A disabled lady walks with a crutch and cries and gets upset when she loses and misses her only friend, Madeline. At first she thought Madeline was a doll, but she was glad Madeline was not a doll when the girls were leaving. Madeline takes Giselle home to spend the night. Giselle's mother, Yvette, bought her a new doll just to cheer her up, but Giselle was missing Madeline. The next day Madeline and the girls arrive at Giselle's house and have fun with her. They all play, and listen to stories with her.
- Paquito, Pablito and Panchito are Pepito's three cousins (primos), they are very naughty and even worse than Pepito used to be. Due to their constant bullying of the girls and being cruel to animals, they are called the "Mean, nasty horrible hats" by the girls.
- Harry Houndai: A magician that Pepito admired after seeing his show what involved a water trick. Houndai came to watch Pepito do magic after Pepito did the water trick by jumping into the fountain in his garden. Houndai rescues him and tells that he must practice to be a magician and makes Pepito a member of The Society of Young Magicians.

== Sales ==
At the time of the 1998 film adaptation's release, the series has sold over 15 million copies worldwide making it one of the best-selling book series of all-time.
