= Romani people in fiction =

Fictional depictions of the Romani ethnic group

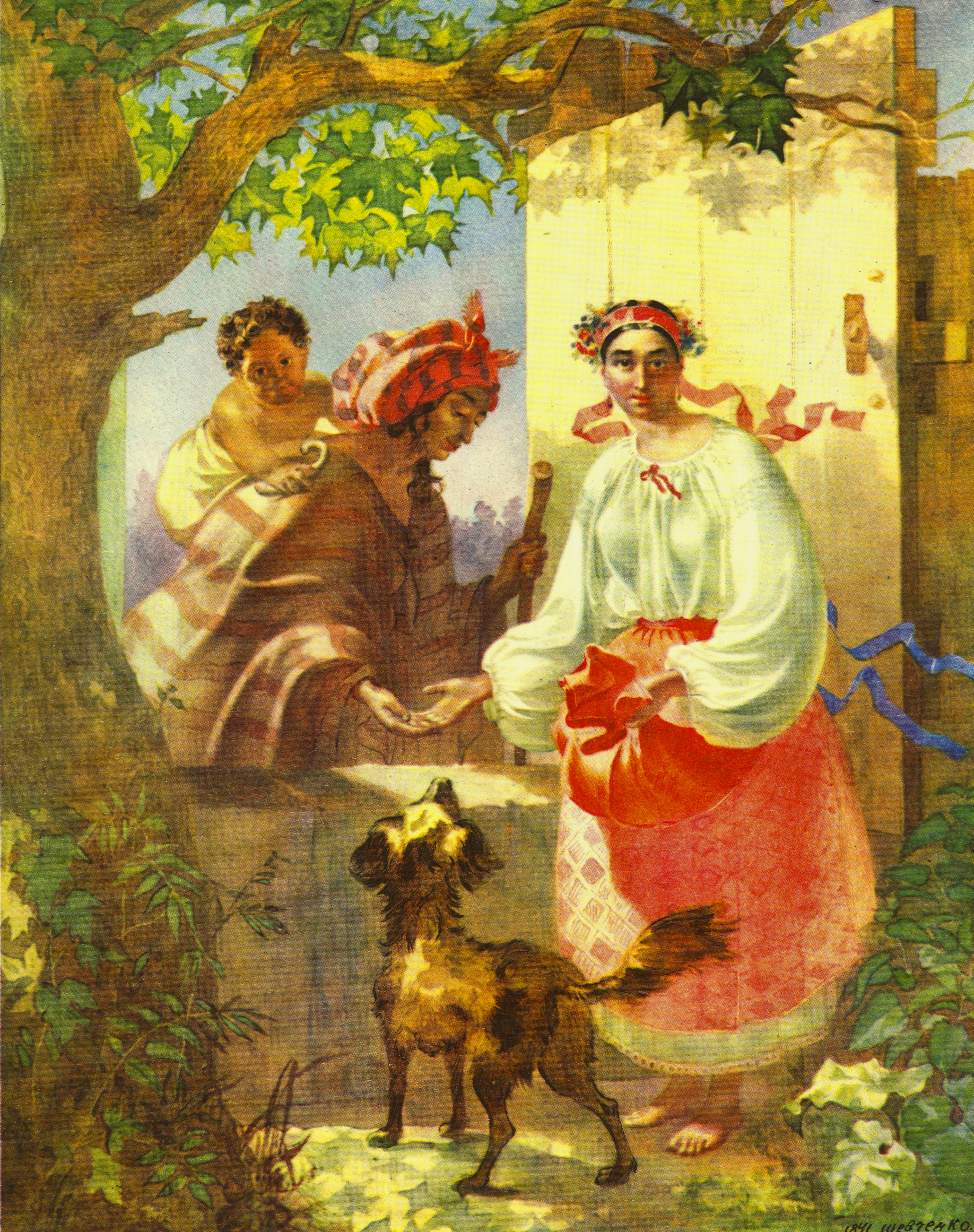
Gypsy Fortune Teller by Taras Shevchenko.

Many fictional depictions of the Roma in literature and art present Romanticized narratives of their supposed mystical powers of fortune-telling, and their supposed irascible or passionate temper which is paired with an indomitable love of freedom and a habit of criminality. Critics of how the Roma have been portrayed in popular culture point out similarities to portrayals of Jewish people, with both groups stereotyped negatively as wandering, spreading disease, abducting children, and violating and murdering others.

The Roma were portrayed in Victorian and modern British literature as having "sinister occult and criminal tendencies" and as associated with "thievery and cunning", and in English Renaissance and baroque theatre as incorporating "elements of outlandish charm and elements which depict [them] as the lowest of social outcasts," connected with "magic and charms," and "juggling and cozening." In opera, literature and music, throughout Europe, Roma women have been portrayed as provocative, sexually available, gaudy, exotic and mysterious. Hollywood and European movies, as well as popular music and other forms of pop culture, have promoted similar stereotypes.

== Literature ==
- 1596: A Midsummer Night's Dream by William Shakespeare – Which includes the lines "Sees Helen's beauty in the brow of Egypt" ("Egyptian" was used to refer to the Roma of England). Here, Theseus is imagining the face of a lover can make the dark-skinned Roma look like Helen of Troy, who he considers more beautiful.
- 1600: As You Like It by Shakespeare – He uses the word "ducdame" (Act II, Sc. 5), possibly a corruption or mishearing of the old Anglo-Romani word dukka me ("I foretell" or "I tell fortunes")
- 1603: Othello by Shakespeare – Desdemona's handkerchief a gift to Othello's mother is a gift from an "Egyptian charmer" who can almost read the thoughts of people.
- 1607: Antony and Cleopatra by William Shakespeare – Cleopatra is twice referred to as a "gipsy," both in the play's opening speech and following Antony's defeat at the Battle of Actium. Early modern people erroneously believed that the Roma had originally hailed from ancient Egypt.
- 1611: The Tempest by Shakespeare – Caliban, the only human inhabitant of the mythical island, is thought to be named after the word Kaliban meaning "black" or "with blackness" in Anglo-Romani. As the first Roma immigrants arrived in England a century before Shakespeare wrote The Tempest, it is thought he may have been influenced by their looks and exoticised them.
- 1815: Walter Scott's novel Guy Mannering.
- 1815: Jane Austen's Emma. Roma make a brief appearance in Emma as children who bait Harriet in a lonely lane. Austen's description of the Roma is romanticized.
- 1831: Victor Hugo's novel The Hunchback of Notre-Dame. The Romani are depicted as to be involved in kidnapping the French girl Agnès to raise her as a seductive dancer under the alias of "La Esmeralda", in place of their deformed child Quasimodo.
- 1845: Prosper Mérimée's novella Carmen. It was later adapted into an opera of the same name by Georges Bizet in 1875.
- 1847: Emily Brontë's novel Wuthering Heights. Heathcliff is described as looking like a Roma man and is presumed to be one by several characters, although this is never confirmed.
- 1847: Charlotte Brontë's Jane Eyre. English Roma set up camp near Thornfield Hall, later Rochester disguises himself as an old Roma fortune teller in order to get Jane to confide her feelings for him.
- 1860: George Eliot's The Mill on the Floss. The protagonist Maggie runs away to Roma, but decides she has gone out of her depth. They do not harm her, but the episode darkly prefigures the steps that she will take in adulthood.
- 1959: Ludwig Bemelmans's fifth Madeline book Madeline and the Gypsies. Madeline and Pepito join the band of traveling gypsies and become part of their carnival.
- 1981: Canadian author Robertson Davies' The Rebel Angels includes two central Ramani characters.
- 1995-2000: Philip Pullman’s His Dark Materials trilogy. In the alternate version of Earth where much of the books’ plot takes place, a boat people inhabiting the waterways of Britain and the North Sea called the Gyptians are based on the Roma. Pullman depicts the Gyptians as a clan-based, noble, freedom-loving people, ruled by a “prince,” who are familiar with magic. The Gyptians assist the protagonist, Lyra Belacqua, in her escapades and ultimately join in the Republic of Heaven’s cosmic rebellion against the tyrannical Authority.

== Other media ==
- The Curse of Strahd supplement for Dungeons & Dragons includes a fantasy version of the Roma, the Vistani. Early printings portrayed the Vistani in a stereotyped light.
- In Marvel Comics, many characters are Romanis like Doctor Doom, Scarlet Witch and Quicksilver, and Meggan. Siblings Colossus, Magik, and Mikhail Rasputin are also of Romani heritage.
- In DC Comics there are Romani characters like Dick Grayson, Madame Xanadu, Ice, and Zatanna Zatara (and Zatanna's father, Giovanni "John" Zatara). DC Comics also has a superheroine called Gypsy (Cynthia "Cindy" Reynolds), who was depicted as Romani when she was first introduced. However, Cynthia was later rebooted as a non-Romani woman, who simply calls herself "Gypsy" as a gimmick (born out of another character noting that she "seems to prefer a more nomadic existence. That makes you something of a trans-dimensional... gypsy.").

== See also ==
- Names of the Romani people
- Anti-Romani sentiment
- Romani literature
