= Bemelmans =

Bemelmans is a surname. Notable people with that surname:

- Fons Bemelmans (born 1938) Dutch artist
- Ludwig Bemelmans (1898–1962), Austria-Hungary-born American writer and illustrator of children's books
  - Bemelmans Bar in the Carlyle Hotel, New York City, named after Ludwig
- Madeleine Bemelmans (born Madeleine Freund), animal rights activist
- Ruben Bemelmans (born 1988), Belgian tennis player
- Theo Bemelmans (born 1943), Dutch computer scientist
