= Daisy von Scherler Mayer =

American filmmaker (born 1966)

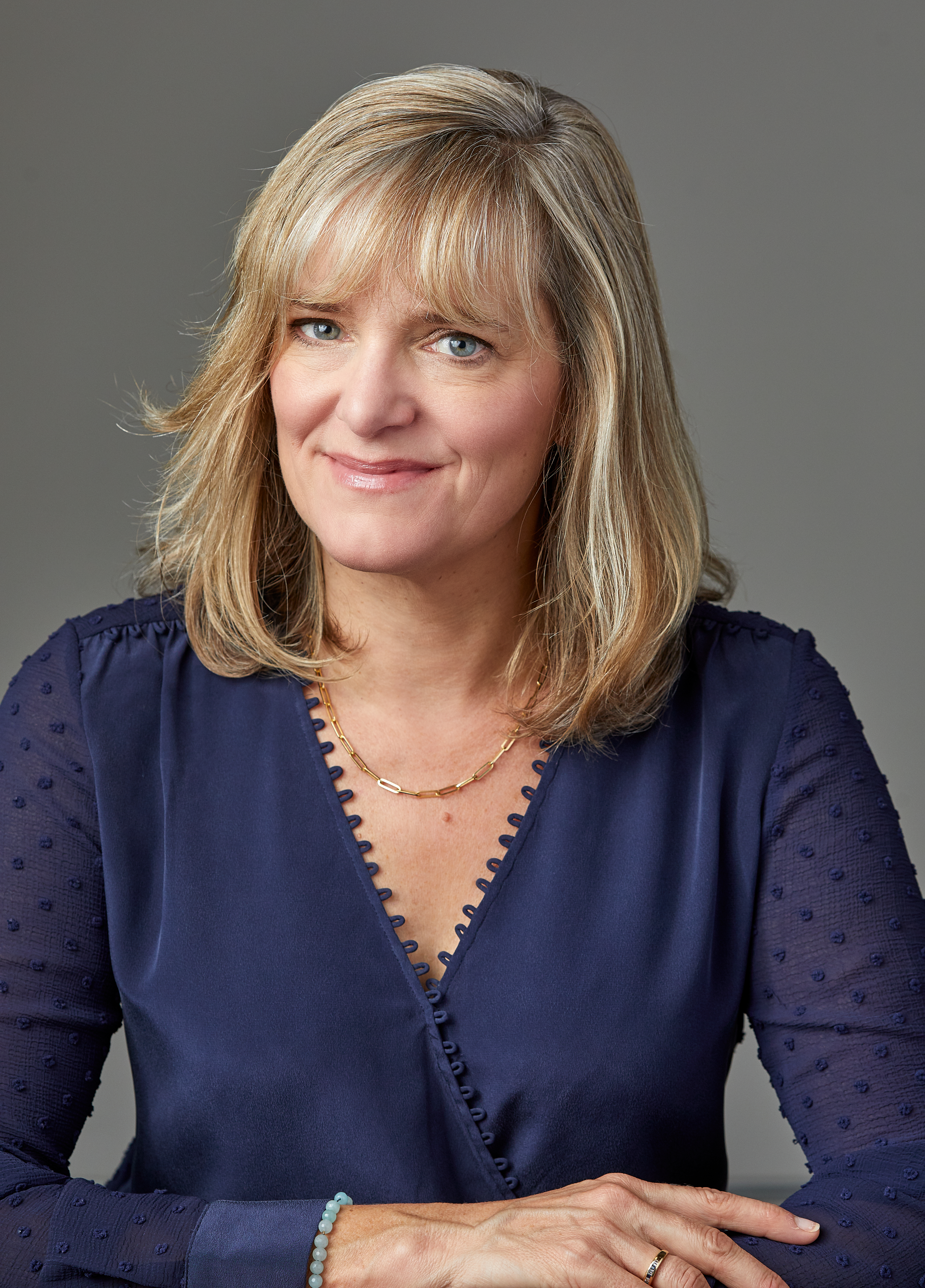
- Daisy von Scherler Mayer in 2019
- Born: September 14, 1966 (age 59); United States
- Occupations: Film director, television director, screenwriter
- Years active: 1989–present
- Spouse: David Carbonara
- Children: 2

Daisy von Scherler Mayer, sometimes credited as Daisy Mayer (born September 14, 1966), is an American film and television director.

== Early life ==
Mayer is the daughter of actress Sasha Von Scherler (born Alexandra-Xenia Elizabeth Anne Marie Fiesola von Schoeler, 1934–2000) and Paul Avila Mayer (1928–2009). She was a grandchild of American screenwriter Edwin Justus Mayer.

== Career ==
After contributing to the New York Shakespeare Festival as a teen, von Scherler Mayer graduated from Wesleyan University with a degree in theater and history. Her experience with theater served as a foundation for her career as a director, where she applied her understanding of stage acting to her work for the screen. Upon graduating from Wesleyan, von Scherler Mayer directed contemporary interpretations of classic plays such as Euripides' Electra, and William Shakespeare's The Tempest and Two Gentlemen of Verona.

Von Scherler Mayer's feature-film directing debut was the 1995 film Party Girl, which starred Parker Posey and von Scherler Mayer's mother, Sasha. Von Scherler Mayer co-wrote the film with her partner, Harry Birckmayer. The success of the film led to a television series starring Christine Taylor. In 2023, Party Girl had a restoration and theatrical re-release.

Since Party Girl, von Scherler Mayer has been writing and directing films as well as directing television productions. She directed Madeline, a 1998 film based on Ludwig Bemelmans' famous children's books about the adventures of a young redhaired French girl. Madeline starred Frances McDormand, Nigel Hawthorne, and Hatty Jones as Madeline. Her recent television projects have included such television series as Halt and Catch Fire, Yellowjackets, The Walking Dead, and The Marvelous Mrs. Maisel, among others.

== Personal life ==
Von Scherler Mayer is married to film composer David Carbonara, with whom she has two daughters.

== Filmography ==
=== Films ===
- Party Girl (1995)
- Woo (1998)
- Madeline (1998)
- The Guru (2002)
- More of Me (2007)
- Frenemies (2012)
- Some Girl(s) (2013)

=== Television ===
- About a Boy
- A Million Little Things
- Aliens in America
- Ben and Kate
- Bosch
- Chuck
- Crazy Ex-Girlfriend
- Doubt
- Emily's Reasons Why Not
- Fear the Walking Dead
- For the People
- Get Shorty
- Girlfriends' Guide to Divorce
- Good Girls Revolt
- Halt and Catch Fire
- High Potential
- House of Lies
- Inventing Anna
- Jane by Design
- The Last Thing He Told Me
- The Last Tycoon
- The Loop
- Mad Men
- Made for Love
- The Marvelous Mrs. Maisel
- Mozart in the Jungle
- Nurse Jackie
- Orange Is the New Black
- Outcast
- Ray Donovan
- Reverie
- Shameless
- Shining Vale
- Shut Eye
- Tell Me Your Secrets
- The Walking Dead
- Whiskey Cavalier
- Y: The Last Man
- Yellowjackets
- Zoey's Extraordinary Playlist
