= Madeline (book) =

1939 children's book by Ludwig Bemelmans

- The cover to the original 1939 Madeline children's book.
- Author: Ludwig Bemelmans
- Illustrator: Ludwig Bemelmans
- Language: English
- Genre: Children's literature
- Publisher: Viking Press
- Publication date: 1939
- Publication place: United States
- Media type: Print (hardcover and paperback); Audiobook

Madeline is a 1939 book written and illustrated by Ludwig Bemelmans, the first in the book series of six, later expanded by the author's grandson to 17, which inspired the Madeline media franchise. Inspired by the life experiences of Bemelmans, the book is considered one of the major classics of children's literature through the age range of 3 to 8 years old. The book is known for its rhyme scheme and colorful images of Paris, which appeals to both children and adults.

== Background ==
Madeline was inspired by the experiences of its Austrian-American author and illustrator Ludwig Bemelmans. Bemelmans spent his first years raised in a hotel in Austria, a dull setting in which he was known for causing trouble. His bold traits contrasted with his post-World War I setting, which is depicted as Madeline's daring personality being surrounded by order. Bemelmans was sent to a private school, but after a disciplinary incident was sent to America where he joined the U.S. Army. He took his inspiration from the war and began drawing cartoons of people around his hotel business, which marked the beginning of his interest in illustrating children's books.

The women in Bemelmans' life, including his wife Madeleine and daughter Barbara, inspired the creation of the book's main character Madeline. He also incorporated inspiration from his experience with schooling within the plot, such as through including some of his mother's memories from her time at boarding school. More personal information is found within the plot's portrayal of a traumatic event in Bemelmans' life when he was taken to the hospital after a bicycle accident. This can be seen depicted through the main plot point of Madeline's experience with emergency appendix surgery.

Publishing Madeline was not easy. During his post-war time in America, he met a publisher who encouraged him to write children's books. Ultimately this publisher rejected Madeline for being too sophisticated for a child audience with images that were too expensive to print, leaving Bemelmans to search for a new publishing opportunity.

== Plot ==
The story is set in an all-girls boarding school in Paris, France. The opening rhyming sentences were repeated at the start of the subsequent books in the series:

In an old house in Paris
That was covered in vines
Lived twelve little girls
In two straight lines.

Madeline is the smallest of the girls. She is seven years old, and the only redhead. The group's troublemaker, she is the bravest and most daring of the girls, flaunting at "the tiger in the zoo" and giving Miss Clavel a headache as she goes around the city engaging in all sorts of antics.

One night, Miss Clavel wakes up, sensing something wrong. She rushes to the girls' bedroom and sees Madeline crying. A pediatrician named Doctor Cohn is called and takes Madeline to the hospital because she has a ruptured appendix. Hours later, Madeline finds herself recuperating in the hospital. She is greeted by her classmates and Miss Clavel, who gives her flowers and a doll house from her Papa. In return, Madeline shows them her scar. Madeline's classmates and Miss Clavel go home, but Miss Clavel wakes up again to find the other little girls wailing, demanding to "have their appendix out too". Miss Clavel, relieved that the matter is trivial, assures them that they're all well and calls on them to go to sleep. The last line of the book is repeated in the endings of all animated adaptations:

And that's all there is
There isn't any more.

== Style ==
The aesthetically pleasing style of writing and illustrations within Madeline contribute to its status as a classic. Madeline's pleasing rhyme is a large contribution to its timeless success. The rhyme scheme is representative of themes of regularity and irregularity, seen through its initial symmetrical verse transitioning into pages of mixed meter with irregular rhyme.

A notable technique within the illustrations is the window in the book technique, which creates the effect that the book is an illusion and not reality. The illustrations also balance symmetry and asymmetry between the framing and images which tie into the plot, for example the recurring symbol of the girls walking in two straight lines. There is a balance between order and disorder, seen through the contrast between the symmetry of the buildings and nature against the chaos that occurs within the book's plot.

Bemelmans primarily drew Madeline in an impressionist art style, blending sketchy elements to create a general, looser idea of Paris rather than a rigid, fact-oriented depiction. This style enables an "aesthetic distance," allowing the audience to partake in the adventure without feeling the danger that may actually be occurring in the scene at hand.

== Analysis ==
Factors such as being set in Paris and being written during World War II impact how Madeline is read and received. Setting the book in Paris specifically appealed to Americans, especially during World War II, as the city was a symbol of Western civilization. Paris' foreign beauty shown within the book's portrayal of the city's order and perfection built a sense of American longing to visit and protect such an iconically chic place. Bemelmans' expressionistic art style also emphasizes visual order and symmetry, which underscores the contrast with Madeline's brave and disruptive individuality. Bemelmans' paintings are a lasting cultural representation of Paris, and are definitive for those who have never been there to see it for themselves. Bemelmans continued to set his books in an idealistic version of Paris, despite their creation during the chaos of war, maintaining the city's pristine reputation. Along with the book promoting a positive representation for Paris, Bemelmans' expressionistic style of art also directly contributed to the popularity of Madeline. The expressionistic art style was popular at the time, making the book a success with adults beyond its success with children. To further expand the audience of Madeline, the story was first published in a periodical for adults prior to releasing them in book form for children.

== Critical reception ==
The American Library Association named Madeline a Caldecott Honor Book for 1940, and later awarded Madeline's Rescue, a subsequent book in the Madeline series, a Caldecott Medal in 1954. In 2012, School Library Journal included the book at #47 on their Top 100 Picture Books list.

== Films ==
In 1952, this story was adapted into a 6-minute animation by United Productions of America, directed by Bobe Cannon and John Hubley. The film was nominated for the 1952 Academy Award for Best Animated Short Film. In 2013, it became available for free viewing and download at the Internet Archive. In February 2026, it was announced that Timothy Reckart's Sycamore Studios would adapt the book as an animated film.
