= Madeline's Christmas =

Book by Ludwig Bemelmans

- Author: Ludwig Bemelmans
- Language: English
- Series: Madeline
- Genre: Children's books, fantasy, classics
- Publisher: Viking Books
- Publication place: United States
- Media type: Print
- Preceded by: Madeline in London
- Followed by: Madeline in America and Other Holiday Tales

Madeline's Christmas is an illustrated children's picture book by Ludwig Bemelmans. It features Bemelman's popular children's character Madeline. It was first published in 1956 as a special book insert to McCalls Magazine, but was not issued independently until 1985.

== Plot ==
The day before Christmas, eleven girls and Miss Clavel catch a cold, except for Madeline. Madeline has to take care of the sick and clean the house all by herself. Thanks to the sudden appearance of a mysterious carpet merchant, she is helped, and everyone's colds are cured. As a matter of fact, the carpet merchant is a magician. And he casts a spell which turns the carpet into a flying vehicle. The girls can go home by that and live at their parents' house for the Christmas holidays. The story ends with everyone going back to the house at the start of the new year.

In the 1990 television version of this story, an old lady named Madame Marie replaces the magician, and instead of the girls going home, their parents are visited to school and spend Christmas together.

== Development ==
Bemelmans is known to have spent a large amount of time before completing a single picture book. Once he had completed a prototype, he published it in magazines to gauge the reaction of readers. Based on the results, he repeatedly improved his work. Only when he was satisfied with the final product did he publish it as an official picture book. This work, too, was still in the prototyping stage, the story was to be revised to focus on the wizard who appears in the work, but Bemelmans died without completing it. Therefore, the story as it appeared in the magazine was published as a picture book.

== Details ==
- Madeline's Christmas by Ludwig Bemelmans. Publisher: New York, N.Y., U.S.A.: Viking Kestrel, 1985. ISBN 0670806668
