= Madeline and the Bad Hat =

1956 book by Ludwig Bemelmans

- First edition
- Author: Ludwig Bemelmans
- Illustrator: Ludwig Bemelmans
- Publisher: Viking Press
- Publication date: 1956
- Media type: Print
- Pages: 64
- ISBN: 0-670-44614-9
- Preceded by: Madeline's Rescue
- Followed by: Madeline and the Gypsies

Madeline and the Bad Hat is a children's picture book by Ludwig Bemelmans. It features the popular children's character Madeline. It was first published by Viking Press in 1956.

== Plot ==
The story opens as the Spanish Ambassador to France moves into the house neighboring the boarding school in Paris. The girls attending the school, including Madeline, watch the ambassador and his family move in with interest. Ms. Clavel, a nurse tasked with caring for the girls, points out that the Ambassador has a young son about their age.

Immediately, Madeline judges the boy (known as Pepito) as a "Bad Hat", or trouble-maker. Pepito performs many antics that vex the schoolgirls, including shooting them with a slingshot, but whenever Ms. Clavel is present, he acts like a polite gentleman, earning her admiration much to the girls' chagrin.

One day, after about a year of living next to each other, Pepito invites the girls to visit his home and view his menagerie. He has captured many animals in the neighborhood and keeps them interned in his room. Madeline rebuffs him and tells him no one is interested in his menagerie. The girls concur and decline his invitation. Feeling dejected, Pepito changes his clothes into that of a Spanish Torero, assuming the girls will find that interesting. Madeline again shuts him down more forcefully, saying the girls don't view bull fighting as noble. Pepito leaves feeling lonely and shuts himself in his room.

Ms. Clavel decides that Pepito simply has pent up energy and needs a hobby to vent his feelings rather than pull pranks. On a daily walk, she takes the girls to a toy store and buys a tool chest for Pepito to learn a trade. Later over dinner, she hears Pepito using the tools to work on a project and assumes the matter has been settled, but she is proven wrong when the girls see that Pepito has built a guillotine using the tool chest to slaughter the cook's chickens, much to their distress.

The girls later encounter Pepito at a forested area, carrying a large sack which attracts a growing pack of dogs. The girls follow with curiosity. Ms. Clavel asserts that Pepito is simply misunderstood and is bringing the dogs food. Pepito then releases a cat from the sack, announcing a game of tag to the dogs, but the cat instead jumps on Pepito's head, causing the dogs to tackle and maul him. Pepito screams for help as Ms. Clavel and Madeline rush to the scene. Ms. Clavel is able to get the dogs away from Pepito as Madeline assures that the cat is not injured.

At the Spanish Embassy, Pepito's parents and the embassy staff all cry in fear for Pepito's well-being. Dr. Cohn then confirms that Pepito will be fine. The Ambassador invites the girls to visit Pepito in his room, to cheer him up.

Madeline is the first one in to visit Pepito. Pepito is in bed, wearing a sling and many bandages. Madeline asserts her belief that Pepito's injury is his punishment for his abusive behavior towards the cat. Pepito apologizes and promises to change his ways. Madeline accepts his apology and says the girls will monitor him.

Pepito begins to change, becoming a vegetarian and, with the girls' help, releasing the animals from his menagerie. Pepito's empathy gets to be too much when they visit the zoo, however. Pepito begins to release the animals from their captivity causing chaos. As Pepito goes to release the lions the girls panic, but Madeline stops him by telling him that he had nothing left to prove and that he is no longer a Bad Hat. She tells him that he means well and the girls are proud of him now. Pepito accepts her laudation and ends his spree of releasing the animals.

Later at night after the mess at the zoo has been cleaned up, the girls return home, have dinner, and brush their teeth. They wave to Pepito through the window before going to bed. As Ms. Clavel turns out the light, she remarks that she knew that things would end well.

== Adaptations ==
Pepito is also a main character in the stories Madeline and the Gypsies and Madeline in London, but in the TV series, he has three cousins named Paquito, Pablito and Panchito who are much worse than he himself was.
