= Mummies Alive! =

- Mummies Alive! title card
- Genre: Action/Adventure; Animation; Mystery fiction; Suspense; Paranormal
- Created by: Louis Gasin
- Written by: Mark Edens; Eric Lewald; Julia Lewald
- Directed by: Seth Kearsley
- Voices of: Bill Switzer; Dale Wilson; Scott McNeil; Graeme Kingston; Cree Summer; Gerard Plunkett; Pauline Newstone
- Theme music composer: Ron Wasserman (credited as RAW)
- Composers: John Campbell; Ron Wasserman
- Countries of origin: Canada; United States
- Original language: English
- No. of seasons: 1
- No. of episodes: 42

Production
- Executive producers: Andy Heyward; Ivan Reitman; Michael Maliani; Robby London; Daniel Goldberg; Joe Medjuck; Janice Sonski
- Producer: Seth Kearsley
- Editors: Mike DePatie; Gail McIntyre
- Running time: 22 minutes
- Production companies: DIC Productions, L.P.; Northern Lights Entertainment
- Budget: $10 million

Original release
- Network: Syndication
- Release: September 15 – November 25, 1997

Mummies Alive! is an animated series created by Louis Gasin from DIC Productions, L.P. and Northern Lights Entertainment. It originally aired for one season in 1997. The show was part of a general trend of "mummymania" in 1990's pop culture.

The series opens in ancient Egypt, where an evil sorcerer kills a prince in order to gain immortality. He is entombed alive, but is revived in 20th-century San Francisco. He finds the prince's reincarnation in a local boy and resumes his quest for immortality. The prince's Egyptian bodyguards are resurrected in order to protect the boy. They use the power of their patron deity Ra to transform into more powerful forms. Other Egyptian gods and spirits soon visit the modern world, including Anubis, Set, Geb, Apep, Bast, Sekhmet, and Bes.

== Plot ==
In ancient Egypt, an evil sorcerer named Scarab kills the pharaoh's son, Prince Rapses, to become immortal. Entombed alive for his crime, Scarab revives in the modern world and begins his search for Rapses' reincarnation, a San Francisco-dwelling boy named Presley Carnarvon, to retrieve the spirit of Rapses so he can become immortal. Rapses' (Presley's) bodyguards, Ja-Kal, Rath, Armon, and Nefer-Tina, along with Rapses' cat, Kahti, awake from the dead to protect him from Scarab. They use the power of Ra to transform into powerful guardians.

Each of the mummies is aligned with the power of an Egyptian god. Ja-Kal uses the spirit of a falcon, Rath uses the spirit of a snake, Armon uses the spirit of a ram, and Nefer-Tina uses the spirit of a cat. The mummies are able to call upon it for magical armor and powers to fight superhuman evildoers by shouting "With the strength of Ra!". Once their strength is exhausted, they must rest in their sarcophagi to regain the ability. The mummies also have the power to make a horrifying face, usually used to scare away nosy bystanders.

In addition to Scarab, the mummies often had to contend with gods and spirits from Egyptian myth summoned to the modern world, including Anubis, Set, Geb, Apep, Bast, Sekhmet, Bes, and many others, usually as part of one of Scarab's schemes that went out of his control.

== Characters ==
=== Main ===
==== Humans ====
- Presley Carnovan (voiced by Bill Switzer): A 12-year-old boy who has the spirit of Prince Rapses XII (an ancient pharaoh) who is based on Ramses, he soon discovers this when the Mummies introduce themselves as his guardians. He lives in San Francisco with his mother. He is reluctant to accept his role as Rapses, but on at least two occasions where he had the chance to be freed of his role, he expressed reluctance at losing his status as "Pharaoh" because it would have also meant him losing the mummies.
- Prince Rapses was the heir to the Egyptian throne 3500 years ago. He was protected by the Mummies (before they were Mummies) but was killed when he was Presley's age by Scarab. His spirit now lies within Presley, and is drawn out by Scarab in several episodes. Rapses himself comes to the present in "The Prince and the Presley", when Scarab steals a time travel scroll to draw him to the present in the hopes that he would be easier to capture than the present Presley. Rapses returns to the past at the end of the episode.
- Amanda Carnovan (voiced by Louise Vallance): Presley's mother, she works at the City Museum. In "Ghouls' Gold", Armon refers to her as "the wise Amanda" when recalling advice she gave Presley. She has insecure feelings that Presley misses being with his father, who is away on business, and tries to bond with her son often, such as taking him out camping, as she desperately tries to fulfill both the role of a father and a mother.

==== Mummies ====
- Ja-Kal (voiced by Dale Wilson): The leader of the Mummies, in his transformed state, his armor resembles a falcon and it also allows him to fly. His weapons are his razor sharp talons and claws, and a bow that can shoot out flaming arrows. In ancient Egypt, Ja-Kal was a hunter who had a wife, named Tia and a newborn son, named Padjet, and had died without knowing what happened to his family. He worries the most of Presley's safety, often acting as a father-figure to him. He commonly uses hunting terms to talk to others and explain situations. Ja-Kal commonly cares for other people's needs first and himself second. In "Family Feud: Part 2 – New Mummy in Town", it was revealed that he had a brother, named Arakh, who was a notorious bandit.
- Rath (voiced by Scott McNeil): The most intelligent of the Mummies, Rath is also the only one able to cast spells. When he transforms, a green snake which turns into a golden cobra wraps around him and serves as his armor. His weapon of choice is a sword that can transform into a snake, but he is also able to perform magical incantations. He also had designed and built the Mummies' vehicles. In the past, he had served as prince Rapses' tutor. He claims to know about science, but his definition is such things as turning a staff into a serpent, although he has learned to adapt some spells to the present, such as a spell that summoned underground snakes to bind his enemies in the past, but now summons electric cables in the present. Though they are enemies, Scarab does respect him for his spellcasting skills.
- Armon (voiced by Graeme Kingston): Armon is huge and eats very often. He is very strong even when not transformed. He lost his right arm fighting in the pharaoh's army, and when he transforms has a golden arm that is used as his weapon. His armor resembles a ram. While not fighting, Armon spends most of his time eating or watching "the magic box" (TV) that Presley gave them. In the past, Armon was Rapses' teacher of combat.
- Nefer-Tina (voiced by Cree Summer): She is the only female of the Mummies. Nefer-Tina is an expert with her whip, has great agility and is extremely proficient at driving the Hot-Ra, the Mummies' dragster-like vehicle. When she transforms her armor is like a cat. Back in ancient Egypt, she had to hide the fact that she was a woman with a head piece or she would not have been allowed to drive chariots. She was known to everyone as Nefer. Only Rapses knew her true identity during that period of time. Ja-Kal and the other members were shocked to find out the truth about Nefer-Tina. Armon then comments "No wonder he never went swimming in the Nile with us". Out of the group, she is the only one who is absolutely willing to try anything modern, such as driving a car and constantly learns under Presley. She also travels the modern world in disguise to try new things. Nefer-Tina's name is based on Queen Nefertiti.
- Scarab (voiced by Gerard Plunkett): The pharaoh's adviser, who later sucked the life force from prince Rapses for youth and immortality, but the effects were not permanent and started to wear off after a few centuries. Now with prince Rapses reincarnated as Presley Carnovan, he will stop at nothing to steal Rapses' life force again. When Scarab transforms, his body is covered in golden and purple armor, resembling that of a scarab beetle and possessing the power of flight. He also possesses a magical talking snake named Heka that acts as his magical staff from time to time, much to her dismay. His powers include shooting energy blasts from his hands, creating Shabti, and extensive knowledge in summoning creatures. He has also seen to have a good grasp of modern technology, as seen most keenly in "Sleight of Hand", where he used technology while competing against the mummies in a mystical contest to try to become Presley's "guardian" himself (although Ja-Kal and Presley were able to expose the deception at the last minute). Additionally, he occasionally uses the identity "Harris Stone" in public, and is a major benefactor for the museum. He killed the real Harris Stone who discovered his crypt and inadvertently freed him, and took over his identity.
- Heka (voiced by Pauline Newstone): The Snake Familiar and sometimes Staff of Scarab, Heka acts as his loyal companion and advisor, who often makes snide, sarcastic remarks and witty observations. She also has the ability to spit fire.

=== Others ===
==== Ancient Egyptians ====
- Amenhotep is Rapses' father, the pharaoh and ruler of all of Egypt. He was a good pharaoh and was very respected by all his people. Being long-deceased, he primarily appears in flashbacks and dreams.
- Ammut (Devourer of Souls) is Scarab's dog-like pet. He has the head of a crocodile, the body of a lion and the hindquarters of a hippopotamus. Ammut was not summoned by Scarab but simply tagged along with the Pack, and then stuck around, and usually messes up anything Scarab tells him to do. In Egyptian Mythology, Ammut is female.
- Apep (voiced by Jason Gray-Stanford): Serpent of the Desert, Apep is an anthropomorphic cobra-like creature who can transform into a young human man. Rapses' grandfather drove Apep out of Egypt and into the desert 3500 years ago. Apep is after revenge and wants Rapses to pay for what his grandfather did to him and when Scarab summons him and his gang, they take on the shapes of a motorbiker gang, but upon meeting and fighting Nefer-Tina, he falls in love with her and decides to disobey Scarab.
- Arakh is Ja-Kal's evil brother and was known as the "Scorpion of the Desert". He can transform into his scorpion armor. His story is told in the three "Family Feud" episodes.
- Bastet is cat goddess of ancient Egypt and the patron goddess of Nefer-Tina, brought to the present in "Paws". She demands to be worshiped by the people.
- Bes is a master of chance and trickery. He is a small mischievous green dwarf who enjoys playing games on people. He especially enjoys flipping a coin to decide on outcomes.
- Chantra is Rath's student of magic who appeared 3500 years ago. She was the best student he ever had, and she became more powerful than Rath. Rath was falling in love with her, but had to stop teaching Chantra when the pharaoh ordered him to teach Rapses. For this reason, Chantra became vengeful and wants to make Rath pay.
- The Eye of Darkness is a horrific monster trapped in a mirror. No one knows his origin. Every 3500 years, when the planets align, he seeks the soul of a pharaoh so that he can exchange himself with the spirit to free himself from the mirror. The pharaoh's soul would then be lost until the planets realign in 3500 more years, a fact that had allowed the Mummies to deduce that Scarab was not involved in its release as Scarab would want Presley's soul for himself. Once unleashed, no power on earth would be able to stop him. Only the one who sets the spell in motion can stop him.
- Geb is a spirit of the earth, a huge rock giant that makes earthquakes when he walks. He is a quite unintelligent giant that attacks anyone who disturbs him. He is also married to the goddess of the sky, Net.
- Ka is a spirit consisting of disembodied arms who lives inside Scarab and comes out of his mouth. In ancient Egyptian religion, the Ka is the spirit of a man's soul and is represented by the symbol of two upright arms.
- Kahti is the sacred cat, sometimes called the sacred kitty. Kahti can transform into a bigger, more-powerful, lynx-sized cat. She was Rapses' pet 3500 years ago, and occasionally serves as Presley's more "immediate" guardian by staying near him when he is not with the other Mummies, her small size allowing her to escape being noticed.
- Kenna is a friend of Nefer-Tina 3500 years ago. Enchantra appears as Kenna in "Eye of the Beholder".
- Kimas is Arakh's son and Ja-Kal's nephew. He might not truly be considered a bad guy, but does side with Scarab and cause the Mummies a lot of grief before he determines where his true allegiances lie. He also can transform into Scorpion armor like his father.
- Net is the spirit of the sky, a cloud-like being who can produce rain and lightning and turn into a tornado. She is also married to the god of earth, Geb.
- Nuhn is the spirit of the primeval waters, a powerful water-spirit occasionally summoned by Scarab for various schemes. He is self-important, irreverent and has a morbid, but slapstick sense of humor.
- Sekhmet is an ancient goddess of sickness and health. She has destroyed whole civilizations with her bad temper. Unlike in actual Egyptian depiction where she is a lion-headed goddess, she has the head of a vulture in this version. Nobody was ever able to defeat her. Sekhmet appears in "The Curse of the Sekhmet" when Scarab summons her to cure his cold - enraged at being summoned for such a trifle, she sets out to destroy the city and Scarab and Rath have to team up to banish her.
- Set and AnubisAnubis (voiced by Scott McNeil (Set) and Blu Mankuma (Anubis)): Set is a bulldog-headed spirit who is leader of the "Trackers of Souls". He calls himself "Dog of the Desert, Master of Evil, Lord of Thunder". Anubis, the not-so-competent jackal (wild dog) spirit of the underworld, tags along with Set. Anubis has a scepter that causes "the sleep of forgetting". They are often summoned by Scarab, but occasionally did turn on him when they did not like to be ordered around. Unlike in real Egyptian mythology, where Anubis is a mostly neutral and clever god, he is one of the villains and is rather dim-witted, often being outsmarted by Presley. The precise species of the animal upon which Set's head is based in actual Egyptian mythology is a notorious source of debate.
- Shabti are golem-like armies of men made of clay controlled by Scarab. They are very easy to defeat as they break into pieces when toppled, but usually there are quite many of them. They also shatter easily when hit and dissolve in water. They most often look like Egyptians, but can be dressed up as anything, such as construction workers or policemen. Sometimes, if they are broken in half, both halves can still function independently.
- Talos is a bronze man brought to life by Scarab. He is normally 100 feet tall, but can reduce his size.
- Tia is Ja-Kal's wife who appeared 3500 years ago. They had a newborn son, named Padjet. In "Sleep Walk Like an Egyptian", the scene shows the last time Ja-Kal sees Tia and Padjet. Tia gives Ja-Kal an imprint of his son's hand. This hand print is now a sad memory for Ja-Kal of the family he once had.

==== Modern humans ====
- Agent Bob Phillips is the director of the Department of Federal Investigation.
- Bix Bingsley is a clumsy, nerdy sales clerk who sells clothes but is allergic to wool. Nonetheless, he gets a kiss from Nefer-Tina in True Believer.
- Bob is rotund police officer, and Joe Pendleton's partner.
- Cynthia Lu is Walter's older sister. Presley has a crush on her, but she is a couple of years older than Presley and likes Benjamin who is in college. Cynthia usually cannot even remember Presley's name and calls him "Preston" or "Wesley".
- Charlie the Janitor is the janitor at the City Museum. Murdoch is his dog. Charlie is an old navy man. He is really proud of the times when he met Mike Conners (Mannix) in '62.
- Elaine Setter is a student in Presley's grade. She likes Presley, but often has a tough time getting his attention.
- Joe Pendleton is a police officer, and the regional treasurer of the Third Annual Paranormal Alien Visitors Psychic convention and Brat-Bust.
- Milton Huxley is Presley's science teacher. Known as Mr. Huxley to his students, and considered to be a "science geek", he is someone who never has fun. He also believes there is an explanation for everything.
- Mr. Francis Hepplewhite is Amanda Carnovan's boss and the director of the Museum.
- Mr. Freddy Ludie is the owner of the Java Spot cafe.
- Paul Carnovan is Presley's father who lives in Memphis (presumably Presley's parents are divorced). His dad claims to be an archeologist, but his true activities are somewhat suspect.
- Professor Henry Bogglesworth is an expert but extremely bad and boring lecturer who discovered the scroll that can open the gates of time.
- The General is a head of Federal Investigation and Agent Phillips' boss.
- Theo, Rosey, Wilcox, and Max are four homeless street people who befriend Rath when he loses his memory in "Dead Man Walking".
- Tiny Turner is the school bully. He and his punk friend Chuck like to rough up the other kids.
- Walter Lu is Cynthia's brother and Presley's friend who is in 7th grade with him.

== Production ==
The series ran for one season of 42 episodes; the last two episodes link together to end the show, as it appears that the episodes 38–40 were the finale of the first season. A second season was planned, but due to low ratings, it was canceled.

Eric and Julia Lewald, writers/producers for Mummies Alive!, were also head writers for the third season of the Gargoyles animated series. The programs share common plot elements, including a group of warriors from the past that awaken in the present to fight a wealthy, immortality-obsessed enemy; their initial difficulties in adapting to the modern world; the use of mythological figures in numerous episodes; and a recurring femme fatale antagonist. These similarities made Mummies Alive! vulnerable to criticism describing it as little more than a Gargoyles clone.

== Episodes ==
No.	Title	Written by	Original release date
1	"Ra, Ra, Ra, Ra"	S : Mark Edens; T : Dean Stefan	September 15, 1997
When an evil sorcerer Scarab is brought back into the real world, he seeks on luring a regular boy named Presley Carnovan, who finds out that he has the spirit of a prince inside of him. The Mummies return to life to protect Presley.
2	"Sleep Walk Like an Egyptian"	S : Mark Edens; T : Brooks Wachtel	September 16, 1997
Scarab uses his magic to send Presley into a luring dream of how his spirit's past life came to be.
3	"Pack to the Future"	S : Mark Edens; T : Matthew Edens	September 17, 1997
Scarab summons three animal spirits to go after a camping-welding Presley, who is out camping with his mom.
4	"The Gift of Geb"	S : Mark Edens; T : Len Uhley	September 18, 1997
Scarab awakens Geb, the spirit of the earth, to weaken the Mummies and demand Ja-Kal to give up Presley, all until the Eclipse rises by for his final chance to become immortal.
5	"Desert Chic"	S : Mark Edens; T : Julia Lewald	September 22, 1997
Three bikers end up becoming the new bodies of several demons, including Apep, unleashed back to the world to gain revenge on Prince Rapses. Meanwhile, Nefer-Tina is frustrated by a lack of respect for her, and ends up meeting and falling in love with Apep.
6	"High Nuhn"	Mark Edens; Steve Cuden	September 23, 1997
Scarab wants to be far younger to gain more life in himself, so he invokes the help of water spirit Nuhn to help him find the Fountain of youth. Meanwhile, Presley wants to try and win the heart of his crush.
7	"Dead Man Walking"	Cary Bates	September 24, 1997
Rath loses his memory and finds himself requiring the help of some homeless people to help him remember who he is and what he does again. Meanwhile, Scarab is attempting to drain years out of homeless people in order to add hours into his own life.
8	"Good Bye Mr. Cheops"	Mark Edens	September 25, 1997
Chantra has been unleashed into the real world and swaps herself out for Presley's real science teacher, who is trapped beyond the western gate. Rath then realizes that he remembers Chantra and not a very pretty sight for him.
9	"Body Slam"	S : Mark Edens; T : Matthew Edens	September 29, 1997
Scarab plants a beetle in Armon, weakening him to the point of him getting depressed. He seeks to prove his strength by fighting against the most powerful beings in a competition, including the Bronze giant Talos.
10	"Paws"	Cary Bates	September 30, 1997
The Cat Goddess Bastet has returned to the real world and sends all the cats, including Nefer-Tina, crazy. Ja-Kal realizes that he has either two choices - defeat Nefer-Tina or end the life of Rapses. Note: This is the first episode where Scarab doesn't appear. This is also the first episode where one of the Mummies disguises themself.
11	"The Curse of Sekhmet"	Steven Melching; Langdon Clarke	October 1, 1997
Scarab summons Sekhmet, the goddess of health, to help him cure his illness, but she'd prefer to destroy San Francisco instead. Due to this, Scarab has no choice but to team up with the Mummies in order to defeat her.
12	"Dog Bites Mummy"	Mark Edens	October 2, 1997
One of Presley's classmates, Elaine, is suspicious of him and his supposed-connection to the Mummies. She gets captured by Set and Anubis, who uses Elaine to lure the Mummies and Presley to Scarab.
13	"Reunion"	Larry Swerdlove; Gary Stuart Kaplan	October 6, 1997
Presley is sad that his father can't make it on Father's Day. Scarab takes advantage of this by using a gryphon to make everyone believe that Amenhotep has returned to reunite with Prince Rapses.
14	"The Prince and the Presley"	Ted A. Pedersen; Francis Moss	October 7, 1997
Tired at chasing Presley and not obtaining his spirit, Scarab uses a scroll to bring back the real Prince Rapses and chase after him instead. Presley ends up becoming lonely when the Mummies leave him to go after the past Prince Rapses.
15	"The Egyp-Tsu Kid"	Gary Greenfield	October 8, 1997
The Mummies teach Presley some new Egyp-Tsu moves when he gets beaten by Tiny Turner, the school bully. This training ends up coming in handy when Tiny and Scarab team up to chase after Presley.
16	"The Face in the Mirror"	Larry Parr	October 9, 1997
Set and Anubis bring forth the Eye of Darkness to take over Presley's body. Note: Scarab doesn't appear in this episode, but he is mentioned.
17	"Miscast"	Adam Gilad	October 13, 1997
After a fight with Scarab, Rath finds himself with magic that can help him and the Mummies create their own Talos. When Presley accidentally bumps the miniature Talos, however, it remembers who it was.
18	"Sleight of Hand"	Richard Mueller	October 14, 1997
Scarab is inspired to challenge the Mummies in a ritual combat to determine who will be the guardians of the prince, allowing Scarab to face the Mummies one-on-one rather than the entire team at once. The rules of the contest prevent any magic being used beyond the combatants' armor and weapons, but Scarab intends to use technology to cheat his way to victory.
19	"Missing Ja-Kal"	Bruce Reid Schaefer	October 15, 1997
Scarab uses a falcon idol to destroy Ja-Kal's symbol and keep him with himself. Meanwhile, the other Mummies join in on a public costume ball called "the Night of the Living Dance".
20	"Ghouls' Gold"	S : Mark Edens; T : Ted A. Pedersen and Francis Moss	October 16, 1997
Scarab gets broke, and he summons some goldminer spirits to help him get rich again, but they decide to take everything valuable for themselves instead, including the Hot Ra and Armon's golden arm.
21	"Tempting Offer"	David Schneider; Drew Daywalt	October 20, 1997
Chontra returns and turns herself into a young girl who has a crush on Presley, making Elaine jealous.
22	"Loss of Face"	S : Mark Edens; T : Matthew Edens	October 21, 1997
A beauty potion intended for Scarab falls on Nefer-Tina, which ends up making her look lively and beautiful. Note: Presley doesn't appear until the very end of the episode.
23	"Kid Scarab"	Steven Melching; Langdon Clarke	October 22, 1997
Scarab ages down to a child, so he can "approach his young victim so that he may be unseen".
24	"Married to the Geb"	S : Mark Edens; T : Larry Swerdlove and Gary Stuart Kaplan	October 23, 1997
Geb is sad because his love, the Sky spirit Net is in a heated feud with him. The Mummies try to find ways to help them make up again. Note: Scarab doesn't appear in this episode.
25	"Water, Water, Everywhere"	S : Mark Edens; T : Matthew Edens	October 27, 1997
Nuhn returns and drains all the water supplies. With this, Scarab decides to scalp everybody of their money in San Francisco by charging $100 for a bottle of water.
26	"A Dark and Shrieky Night"	Paul Harrison	October 28, 1997
After a fight with Scarab, they find themselves a long way out of their sphinx. They don disguises and experience the depths of San Francisco, bumping into people along the way. Note: Presley doesn't appear in this episode.
27	"Pepped with Good Intention"	S : Mark Edens; T : Richard Merwin	October 29, 1997
Apep returns after Nefer-Tina wishes on a star. He wants to marry her once again, and plans to deliver Presley to Scarab, with the intent of double-crossing Scarab in order to please Nefer-Tina.
28	"Dr. Jekyll and Mr. Huxley"	S : Mark Edens; T : Stephanie Mathison	October 30, 1997
Mr. Huxley and Ja-Kal are accidentally zapped by Presley's science project, which completely changes their personalities. Note: Scarab doesn't appear in this episode.
29	"Monster Truck Mania"	Sindy McKay	November 3, 1997
Presley's friend Bubba Baxter accidentally gets knocked out, so the Mummies and Presley decide to take his place, but Geb's nearby magical mud accidentally turns the Monster Trucks into moving monsters. Note: Scarab doesn't appear in this episode.
30	"Eye of the Beholder"	Matthew Edens	November 4, 1997
Chontra returns and uses the "eyes of windows" to get revenge on the Mummies, especially Rath.
31	"Tree O'Clock Rock"	S : Mark Edens; T : Len Wein	November 5, 1997
Scarab summons Bes to help him grab the Tree of Life to make him young, but the plan backfires when it instead ages everything in San Francisco instead.
32	"Object of His Affections"	Eric Lewald; Richard Merwin	November 6, 1997
Talos falls in love with a statue and wishes it would come to life. Scarab however says that this could come true if he could grab Prince Rapses.
33	"The Bird-Mummy of Alcatraz"	Matthew Edens	November 10, 1997
Scarab locks up Ja-Kal in jail and summons a firebird spirit to chase after the Mummies and Presley.
34	"Honey, I Shrunk the Mummies"	Steven Melching; Langdon Clarke	November 11, 1997
Rath's magical talisman accidentally shrinks the Mummies into cockroach-size.
35	"True Believer"	Adam Gilad	November 12, 1997
When the Mummies are out purchasing clothes, the sales clerk gets infatuated with Nefer-Tina. This proves in handy when he gets injured and Scarab is on the loose. Note: Presley does not appear in this episode, but he is indirectly mentioned at the beginning.
36	"Who's Who?"	S : Mark Edens; T : Jeff Kwitny	November 13, 1997
Bes returns, and swaps the Mummies' personalities, and even Scarab and Presley's with Ammut and Kahti.
37	"My Dad the Hero"	Seth Kearsley	November 17, 1997
Presley's dad, Paul Canovan, has returned but doesn't act the way Presley was expecting from him. Things get worse when he steals the Crown of Ramses the Great and causes Scarab to turn into a massive unstoppable monster.
38	"Family Feud: Part 1 – Brother's Keeper"	S : Mark Edens; T : Steve Cuden	November 18, 1997
When two Mummy sarcophagus are brought in for a new exhibit, Set and Anubis take them for Scarab so he can bring them back to life. One of them contains Ja-Kal's evil brother, Arakh, who is then brought back to life. Arakh decides to side with Scarab in a way to finally defeat Ja-Kal once and for all.
39	"Family Feud: Part 2 – New Mummy in Town"	S : Mark Edens; T : Len Uhley	November 19, 1997
Arakh's son, Kimas, has also been brought back to life by Scarab and he doesn't know who to side with, his own Dad, or his uncle Ja-Kal.
40	"Family Feud: Part 3 – The Heart's Arrow"	S : Mark Edens; T : Ted A. Pedersen and Francis Moss	November 20, 1997
The Mummies try and find a way to destroy Arakh's scorpion charm, so he gets sent back through the Western Gate forever.
41	"We've Got One"	Steven Melching; Langdon Clarke	November 24, 1997
Rath accidentally gets himself and Bob the Policeman knocked out, but a federal investigator, named Agent Phillips, wants to send Rath to space, in order to impress "The General". Note: Presley doesn't appear in this episode.
42	"Show Me the Mummy"	Eric Lewald	November 25, 1997
Joe Pendelton hosts a radio show, asking local people who and what the Mummies are. Note: This is a clip show, featuring clips from previous episodes.

== Broadcast ==
=== North America ===
Mummies Alive! originally aired on syndicated television stations in the United States (mostly on The WB, UPN and Fox affiliates), being distributed through Hasbro's Claster Television. In February 1998, Bohbot Entertainment acquired the syndication rights to the series and aired it on their BKN block until 2000.

In September 2004, the series alongside Sonic Underground was added to the syndicated DIC Kids Network block, where both shows would air during the weekends as part of an hour of non-E/I material.

From 2009-2010, the series aired every Sunday on Cookie Jar Toons on This TV.

In Canada, the series aired on YTV. Three of the series' episodes were combined and released as the 1998 film Mummies Alive! The Legend Begins, produced by DIC Entertainment.

=== Overseas ===
In the United Kingdom, the series first aired on GMTV on the Disney-produced block Diggit as one of its launch programmes. It later aired on Sky One from 1999 until 2002. From 2004–2006, the series aired on ITV2 as part of GMTV2 Kids (later Action Stations!).

In India, the Hindi-dubbed version of the show ran on Cartoon Network. It was also dubbed into Tamil and Malayalam and aired on Sun TV and Amrita TV in the early 2000s, becoming popular in South India. The show was telecasted on DD Metro Channel from 1998 to 2000, and was later converted to DD News.

== Home media ==
=== United States ===
The three part "Family Feud" arc was edited together as a single film, entitled Mummies Alive! The Legend Begins, and was released on VHS on April 7, 1998, by Buena Vista Home Entertainment.

In August 2001, the first four episodes of the series were released on VHS and DVD simply titled Mummies Alive!, by Lions Gate Home Entertainment and Trimark Home Video. The DVD version also included a bonus episode, as well as an interview with Andy Heyward and Ivan Reitman about the series.

In October 2003, Sterling Entertainment released the first three episodes on VHS and DVD under the title of Mummies Alive! - The Beginning. The DVD release contains the fourth episode as a bonus. NCircle Entertainment re-released the DVD in August 2007.

=== Europe ===
In June 2004, Anchor Bay UK released a single VHS/DVD volume in the United Kingdom containing the first four episodes. The company released a second DVD in August, containing the next four episodes. In June 2005, Avenue Entertainment released two DVDs containing two episodes each.

Three volumes of double DVDs were released in Germany, with 14 episodes on each volume. The complete 42 episode series is available as of March 2017, the release date of the third and final volume. The DVDs are region 2 with German, and English audio as well.

== Reception ==
Harlene Ellin of the Chicago Tribune panned The Legend Begins: "The saga jumps between past and present without warning, giving the story a disjointed feel. And while the animated adventure goes for laughs at times, the jokes generally fall flat". She was also critical of the series' animation: "All the characters move as if they have rigor mortis. Mouths flap open and shut when delivering dialogue, giving the film a primitive look". She gave the film one star.

== Merchandise ==
To coincide with the animated series, DIC signed deals with various companies to make merchandise for the series.

Hasbro produced a series of Mummies Alive! 5" tall action figures and vehicles in 1997. There were regular and "fright face" varieties of the main mummies. Nefer-Tina and Presley got toys as well, but they are later releases and harder to find. A final wave of toys would have contained a Night Hunter Ja-Kal and Armon, as well as Cobra Strike Pep but only a few of these figures were released in some parts of Europe.

== See also ==
- The Mummy (TV series)
