= John Bemelmans Marciano =

American writer (born 1970)

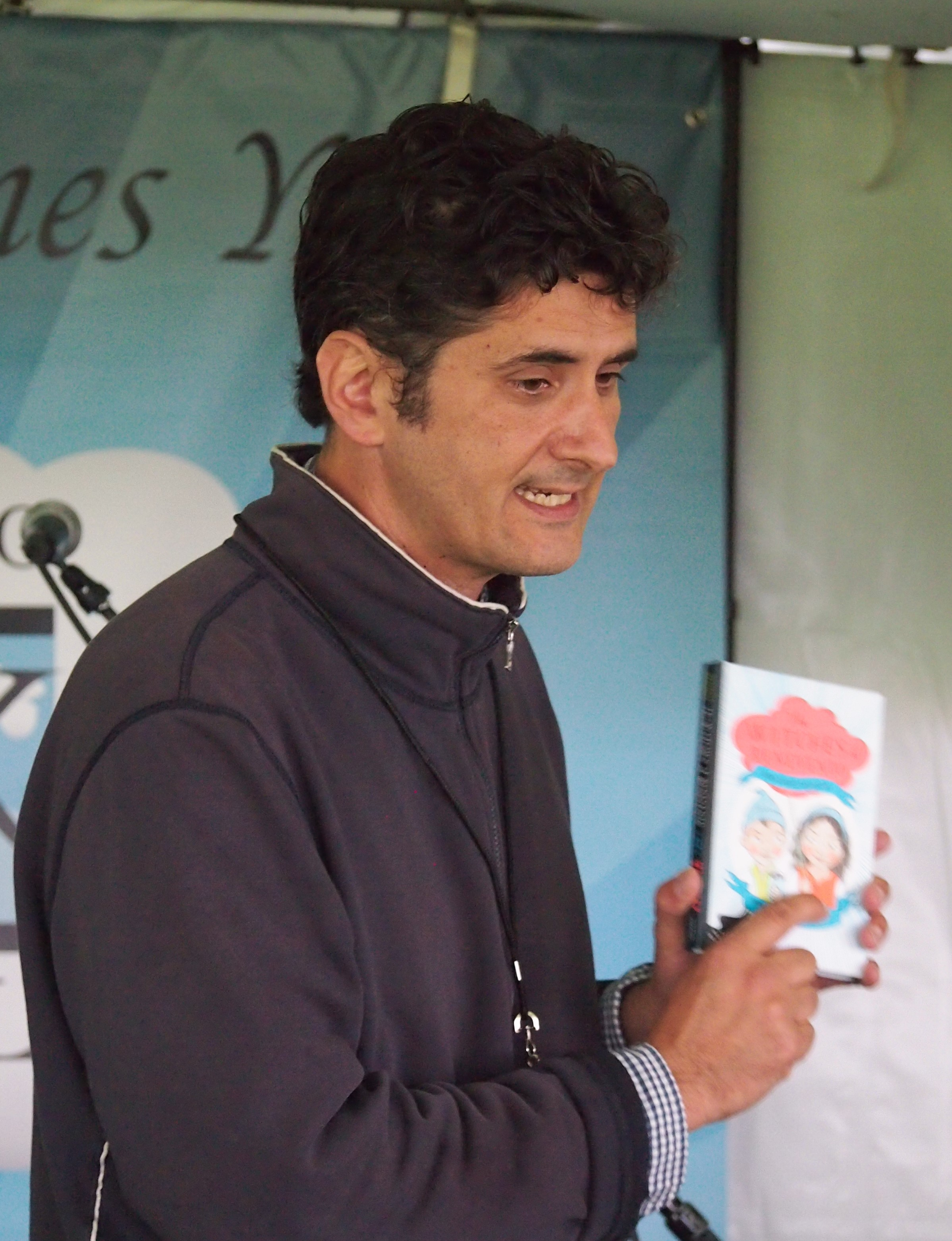
- Born: 1970 (age 55–56)
- Education: Columbia University (BA)
- Occupation: writer
- Relatives: Ludwig Bemelmans (grandfather); Madeleine Bemelmans (grandmother)

John Bemelmans Marciano (born 1970) is an American author and illustrator who has published nonfiction books and children's literature, including several books in the Madeline series, created by his grandfather Ludwig Bemelmans.

== Life ==
John Bemelmans Marciano was born in 1970 and grew up on a horse farm in Three Bridges, New Jersey. He graduated from Columbia University in 1992.

As the grandson of Ludwig Bemelmans, creator of the children's book series Madeline, Marciano has continued the series with seven books in his grandfather's style, including Madeline and the Cats of Rome, Madeline at the White House and Madeline and the Old House in Paris. In 2016 he wrote a middle-grade fiction book called The 9 Lives of Alexander Baddenfield, illustrated by Sophie Blackall.

Marciano's non-fiction books for adults include a 1999 biography of his grandfather titled Bemelmans: The Life and Art of Madeline’s Creator. In 2014, he published a non-fiction books for adults called Whatever Happened to the Metric System? How America Kept its Feet, published by Bloomsbury.

== Personal life ==
He lives in Brooklyn with his wife, a set designer, and their daughter.
