= Madeline (1998 film) =

- Theatrical release poster
- Directed by: Daisy von Scherler Mayer
- Screenplay by: Mark Levin; Jennifer Flackett
- Story by: Malia Scotch Marmo; Mark Levin; Jennifer Flackett
- Based on: Madeline by Ludwig Bemelmans
- Produced by: Saul Cooper; Pancho Kohner; Allyn Stewart
- Starring: Frances McDormand; Nigel Hawthorne
- Cinematography: Pierre Aïm
- Edited by: Jeffrey Wolf
- Music by: Michel Legrand
- Production company: TriStar Pictures
- Distributed by: Sony Pictures Releasing
- Release date: July 10, 1998
- Running time: 88 minutes
- Countries: United States; France
- Language: English
- Box office: $30 million

Madeline is a 1998 family comedy film adaptation of the children's book series and animated. The film starred newcomer Hatty Jones as the titular character with Frances McDormand and Nigel Hawthorne in supporting roles as Miss Clavel and Lord Covington respectively. The film encompasses the plots of four Madeline books. It was released on July 10, 1998 by TriStar Pictures.

== Plot ==
In 1956 Paris, a young orphaned girl named Madeline attends a Catholic boarding school with eleven other girls, taught by the strict yet loving nun Miss Clavel and fed by the passionate chef Hélène. Despite having neither a family nor money, Madeline maintains a positive, yet mischievous attitude.

One night, Madeline is stricken with appendicitis and taken to the hospital, where she undergoes an appendectomy. During her stay there, Madeline bonds with Lady Covington, the terminally ill wife of the school's board of trustees member, Lord Covington. Unlike her husband, Lady Covington cares deeply for the school and the girls, having attended herself as a girl. Lady Covington reveals she carved her birth name, Marie-Gilberte, into one of the dorm's bed frames and asks Madeline to find out if her name is still there. A few days later, when Madeline leaves the hospital, she learns that Lady Covington has died. True to her promise, she finds Lady Covington's name and adds her own.

Later, the Spanish ambassador purchases the property next door to the school and moves there with his family. While the other girls are smitten with the ambassador's spoiled son Pepito, Madeline is irritated by the noise he creates while riding around on his Vespa, calling him a "Bad Hat". Shortly after the ambassador's arrival, Lord Covington announces the plans on closing the school following his wife's passing and selling the building. Miss Clavel, unnerved by Pepito's bothering her girls, attempts to make peace with the boy by giving his tutor, Leopold, a toolbox for him; however, her actions are unsuccessful as Pepito steals Madeline's drawing pad and vandalizes it during a field trip.

Pepito invites the girls to his birthday party, during which he unnerves them by showing a mouse and joking about killing it. Madeline, infuriated by Pepito's actions, gets into a physical fight with him and releases all of his mice, causing the girls' visit to be cut short. As punishment, Miss Clavel forces the girls to write lines the following morning. While out on a daily walk later, Madeline accidentally falls into the Seine while standing on the ledge of a bridge going over the river. She is rescued by a stray Labrador Retriever, whom she names Genevieve. Genevieve follows Madeline to the school and the girls convince Miss Clavel, who has an allergy to dogs, to keep her.

Wanting to save the school from being shut down, Madeline enlists Pepito's help to sabotage Lord Covington's attempts to sell the property. During this time, the two become friends, but her efforts are ultimately discovered by Lord Covington, who initially blames Miss Clavel. Madeline tries to take responsibility for her involvement, though Lord Covington is unmoved by her apology or the motivation behind her actions (especially after she accidentally calls him "Lord Cucuface"). After leaving, he discovers Genevieve and, as revenge against the girls, turns her loose into the night.

The next day, Miss Clavel takes the girls to a circus in hopes of cheering them up and helping them cope with the loss of Genevieve. Madeline, blaming herself for what happened and fearing she'll have no place to go as an orphan once the school closes, decides to join the circus, hoping to make friends and find a home within the community there. After confiding in her best friend Aggie of her plans and making her swear not to tell, Madeline leaves the group and unintentionally stumbles upon Leopold, with the help of a trio of clowns known as "The Idiots", kidnapping Pepito, hoping to ransom him. While trying to intervene, she is abducted as well. Aggie confesses to Miss Clavel that Madeline ran away while Pepito's parents discover he's missing.

Madeline and Pepito manage to break free of their bonds and find a motorcycle. Madeline uses her hair clip to start it and Pepito drives them away, using his experience with his Vespa. The two are pursued by Leopold and the idiots but Miss Clavel, who is driving in search of Madeline (finding and picking up Genevieve along the way), is able to cause the idiots to crash into a lake. The police eventually arrive and arrest the kidnappers, while Miss Clavel, Madeline, Pepito, and Genevieve head back to the school.

Shortly after Madeline's return, Lord Covington arrives and shares that he's sold the property to the ambassador of the Uzbek Soviet Socialist Republic. Madeline realizes he wants to sell the school as it reminds him of his wife's passing. She empathizes with Lord Covington, sharing her experience of losing her own family and assuring him that Lady Covington is still with him and the school. Miss Clavel promises Madeline that they'll be together regardless of what happens. Lord Covington is moved by Madeline's words and sincerity, but regretfully tells her and the girls that there's nothing he can do as he's already sold the property. In a happy twist, the ambassador, also moved by Madeline, decides to back out of the sale and allow the girls to keep their school. The film then concludes with a montage of the girls, Miss Clavel and Genevieve attending a fair, accompanied by Louis Armstrong's "What a Wonderful World", and changes back to the book setting as the word "Fin" appears.

== Cast ==
Children

- Hatty Jones as Madeline
- Kristian De La Osa as Pepito
- Clare Thomas as Agatha "Aggie"
- Bianca Strohmann as Victoria "Vicki"
- Rachel Dennis as Lucinda
- Eloise Eonnet as Sylvette
- Morgane Farcat as Marie-Odile
- Pilar Garrard as Beatrice
- Emilie Jessula as Elizabeth
- Alice Lavaud as Veronica
- Christina Mangani as Chantal
- Jessica Mason as Serena
- Alix Ponchon as Lolo

Adults

- Frances McDormand as Miss Clavel
- Nigel Hawthorne as Lord "Cucuface" Covington
- Stéphane Audran as Lady Marie-Gilberte Covington
- Arturo Venegas as Mr. Spanish Ambassador
- Katia Caballero as Mrs. Spanish Ambassador
- Katia Tchenko as Mrs. Uzbekistani Ambassador
- Chantal Neuwirth as Hélène the cook
- Ben Daniels as Leopold the tutor
- Emil Abossolo-Mbo as Circus Barker
- Julien Maurel as Idiot Popovov no. 1
- George Harris as Mr. Liberian Ambassador

== Production ==
=== Development and writing ===
While largely based on the original series, with storylines from three of the picture books weaved into the plot, several liberties were taken with the characters' backstories. Notably, Madeline is depicted as an orphan in the film, while in the books, she receives a dollhouse from her father and is known not only to have both her parents but siblings as well.

The film's costume department went for some artistic licence in developing the costumes for Madeline. Aside from moving the time period from the late 1930s to the mid 1950s, the producers elected for saturated blues and reds in the students' uniforms while keeping them as believable as possible, ruling out the possibility of using grey as it was seen as depressing. Similar considerations were made for Frances McDormand's character, a novice nun who, according to research, would have worn a short black habit; a softer blue habit similar to the one worn by Miss Clavel in the books was used instead.

=== Filming ===
Principal photography took place in Paris from September 1997 to January 1998, with English actress Hatty Jones, then 9 years old, cast as the main character. Unlike the books, the film takes place in 1956, not 1939 to avoid references to World War II. Many of the landmarks from the books appear in the film, although some were too crowded with modern traffic to be used.

== Release and reception ==
=== Home video ===
Madeline was released on VHS, part of the Columbia TriStar Family Collection series, and DVD on December 15, 1998.

=== Critical response ===
This film received mixed to positive reviews upon release. It currently has a 65% approval rating on Rotten Tomatoes based on 31 reviews, with an average score of 6.4/10. The site's consensus states: "It may be a tad tedious for older viewers, but Madeline's clever, adventurous heroine is likely to charm its intended audience". Audiences polled by CinemaScore gave the film an average grade of "A−" on an A+ to F scale.

On their TV show, Gene Siskel and Roger Ebert awarded the film with "Two Thumbs Up". Nell Minow of Common Sense Media said that the film was "great for young kids and fans of the books". AOL movie critic Brandon Judell said of it: "No horribly arch double entendres to draw in audiences who can't spend two hours in a theater without having their libido massaged". Jeffery Huston called it "a disarming, charming fable so artfully crafted that adults will fall under its spell". Conversely, John R. McEwen gave a negative review, stating that the film was: "...Adequately simple for children, though perhaps a bit pedestrian for adults". A similarly negative review was given by Michael O'Sullivan of The Washington Post, stating that "their 8-year-old daughters will less likely be impressed by the meandering story, dull visuals and flat characterizations".
