= Madeline in America and Other Holiday Tales =

1999 Children's book by Ludwig Bemelmans

- First edition
- Author: Ludwig Bemelmans
- Illustrator: John Bemelmans Marciano
- Cover artist: Bemelmans Marciano
- Language: English
- Series: Madeline
- Genre: Children's book
- Published: 1999 (Arthur A. Levine)
- Publication place: United States
- Pages: 111
- ISBN: 0590039105

Madeline in America and Other Holiday Tales is an illustrated collection of short stories by Ludwig Bemelmans, with only one of the stories featuring his popular children's character Madeline. This collection was first published in 1999 by Arthur A. Levine Books. It features stories previously published in other publications, with artwork by Ludwig Bemelmans' grandson, John Bemelmans Marciano.

== Plot ==
In the main tale, Madeline's great-grandfather dies, and he ends up leaving her a fairly large inheritance. Madeline and her classmates, under the direction of their teacher, Miss Clavel, go to America and have a wonderful vacation. It just so turns out that, much to Madeline's regret, she cannot claim the inheritance her great-grandfather left for her until she comes of age. While Madeline, her classmates and their teacher ultimately return to Paris, Madeline desires to eventually return to America.
