= Madeline: Lost in Paris =

- Home video release poster
- Directed by: Stan Phillips
- Written by: Jacqueline Feather; David Seidler
- Based on: Madeline by Ludwig Bemelmans
- Produced by: Stan Phillips; Riley Kathryn Ellis
- Starring: Lauren Bacall; Jason Alexander; Andrea Libman; Stevie Vallance
- Narrated by: Christopher Plummer
- Music by: Andy Street
- Production company: DIC Entertainment, L.P.
- Distributed by: Buena Vista Home Entertainment (Note: Under Walt Disney Home Video imprint.)
- Release date: August 3, 1999
- Running time: 75 minutes
- Country: United States
- Language: English

Madeline: Lost in Paris is a 1999 American direct-to-video animated musical adventure comedy-drama film produced by DIC Entertainment, L.P. It was released on August 3, 1999, to VHS by Buena Vista Home Video under the Walt Disney Home Video imprint. In 2009, the film was released on iTunes for the film's 10th anniversary.

== Plot ==
Madeline, an orphaned girl who attends a Parisian boarding school, receives a letter in the mail from her long-lost Uncle Horst from Vienna, who is planning on a visit. He arrives at the school later that week, where he announces that he has been designated Madeline's new legal guardian, while showing the court papers to Miss Clavel, her teacher. Horst plans on taking her to his hometown Vienna, to attend a fine finishing school, and prepares to leave the following day via the Orient Express. Madeline and her classmates react with shock, elation, and sadness.

When Uncle Horst and his niece set off the next morning, he takes Madeline on the Paris Métro, rather than the Orient Express, to an unfamiliar part of the town ravaged with poverty and crime. Realizing she is being kidnapped, Madeline throws beads of her mother's treasured necklace to make a trail to where she is taken to. It is revealed that Uncle Horst is not Madeline's uncle, but a Frenchman named Henri, who works for Madame LaCroque, the owner of a lace shop/factory. Henri takes Madeline to the lace shop's basement, full of orphan girls who are forced into making laces to sell. One of the girls, Fifi, befriends Madeline. It is then revealed that Madeline's court custody papers were forged by Madame LaCroque, and that the criminal duo plan to steal her family inheritance as she labors in the factory.

Meanwhile, Miss Clavel, the girls, and Pepito have attempted to follow Madeline and Horst so that Pepito could give her his Halloween parting gift: a shrunken head from Brazil. They arrive at the train station, only to learn that the two had taken the Métro, not the Orient Express. They also find Genevieve abandoned at the station. Fearing the worst, Miss Clavel enlists the police to help them rescue Madeline.

At the lace shop, the child workers endure enormous amounts of emotional and physical abuse at the hands of LaCroque. Fifi tells Madeline of how LaCroque was once a cabaret dancer who experienced a performance disaster. In total humiliation, she stopped performing and sold her long hair to make lace. She and Henri then gained legal custody of all the orphan girls. Rather than taking care of them (as she promised to the courts), she uses them as her miserable slaves.

Despise this, Madeline still plans to escape with the orphan girls, soon after many fall attempts, they still make their escape through the window before LaCroque discovers them and cuts a piece of Madeline's hair, which she was used to make a lace for a customer.

Through following the trail of Madeline's beads, Madeline's classmates and Pepito find their way to the factory. Pepito uses his shrunken head to first knock off LaCroque's wig from outside the window (revealing her bald head), and then frighten her to the ground. Meanwhile, Miss Clavel and the police catch Henri walking through the streets of Paris, planning to sell off Madeline's belongings. Through a plea bargain deal, Henri agrees to lead them to the lace factory, in exchange for a lighter punishment. Madeline and all of her friends are able to tie up LaCroque in endless rolls of lace just as the police arrive with Henri and Miss Clavel. Henri makes one last attempt to escape, only to be tripped by Pepito's spool trick, allowing the girls to tangle him up as well. The criminal duo are arrested by the police and taken away. The factory girls, however, still have no place to call home.

Madeline receives a substantial financial reward for LaCroque's capture, and she uses it to start a school for her lace factory coworkers. The girls from both schools rejoice in the fact that they are all one whole family.

== Voice cast ==
- Andrea Libman as Madeline
- Christopher Plummer as The Narrator
- Lauren Bacall as Madame LaCroque
- Jason Alexander as Uncle Horst / Henri
- Stephanie Louise Vallance as Miss Clavel, Genevieve
- Michael Heyward as Pepito
- Brittney Irvin as Chloe
- Veronika Sztopa as Nicole

Additional voices include Alex Hood, Jennifer Copping, Tabitha St. Germain, Rochelle Greenwood, French Tickner, Michael Heyward, Garry Chalk, Dale Wilson, Jane Mortifee

== Production ==
In March 1999, Madeline: Lost in Paris was announced as the first project from DIC's new "video premieres" division.

== DVD releases ==
Shout! Factory released the film on DVD on April 3, 2010. It was released in Australia in 2013 by Umbrella Entertainment.

== Reception ==
William David Lee of DVD Town, criticized the special for its "not very memorable" songs and "simplistic and predictable" story. He did, however, recommend the film for young children audience.
