= Mummies Alive! The Legend Begins =

- Promotional poster
- Directed by: Seth Kearsley
- Written by: Mark Edens
- Produced by: Seth Kearsley
- Starring: Graeme Kingston; Scott McNeil; Pauline Newstone; Gerard Plunkett; Cree Summer; Bill Switzer; Dale Wilson
- Music by: John Campbell; Ron Wasserman (credited as RAW)
- Production companies: DIC Productions, L.P. (Note: Animation outsourced to Mook Animation.); Northern Lights Entertainment
- Distributed by: Buena Vista Home Entertainment
- Release date: April 7, 1998
- Running time: 60 minutes
- Countries: Canada; United States
- Language: English

Mummies Alive! The Legend Begins is a 1998 animated action fantasy film produced by DIC Productions, L.P., which combines three episodes of the Mummies Alive! cartoon into a single feature-length film, with some scenes edited to make it continuous. The plot centers on the Mummy Ja-Kal, whose brother and nephew are revived by Scarab in an attempt to kill him.

== Plot ==
=== Brother's Keeper ===
At the local museum, Presley Carnovan and the Mummies discover a new exhibit about Egyptian artifacts. Part of the exhibit includes two sarcophagi, each labeled "Kimas" and "Scorpion". When Ja-Kal comes across the sarcophagi and looks at it, the other Mummies are surprised about how he remembers the names.

When the Mummies and Presley leave the room, Ja-Kal begins to open them up, until Set and Anubis attack him, revealing they are working for Evil Sorcerer Scarab to steal the Mummies inside and use them to battle against him and the others. Set and Anubis successfully escape with the sarcophagi and head back to Scarab's lair, where the three then summon the Mummy inside the "Scorpion"-labeled sarcophagus, named Arakh, and bring him back to life.

Meanwhile, Ja-Kal reveals to the other Mummies about his brother Arakh, who during the 1500s, was a spear bearer for Amenhotep. When Ja-Kal had saved his life from a lion, he was left in the dust when Ja-Kal was made the leader of the Royal Hunt. From that point on until his death, Arakh began working with Scarab on his main plot to kill Prince Rapses and then eventually Ja-Kal.

=== New Mummy in Town ===
Ja-Kal and Arakh soon confront each other in the museum and fight. Back at his lair, Scarab summons the other Mummy, Kimas, who is Ja-Kal's nephew and Arakh's son. Upon Heka's request, Kimas soon explores San Francisco and later meets Nefer-Tina and Armon, unbeknownst that Scarab and Arakh were planning to use him to trust the other Mummies and kill Ja-Kal.

Nefer-Tina and Armon take him to various places in the city until Scarab and his Shabti attack the two Mummies, to which they discover that Kimas is a mummy and can transform in armor as they can. They all soon escape and Kimas reunites with his uncle Ja-Kal. Ja-Kal gets extremely cautious about how Kimas is, and then soon begins to contemplate Kimas, Arakh, and his own duty of being the leader of the Mummies and protecting Presley.

=== The Heart's Arrow ===
Back at the Sphinx, Rath discovers the power of Arakh's scorpion charm and that if it is destroyed, Arakh would be sent back alongside his armor beyond the Western Gate, and plot to find it to send him back. They are soon interrupted by Presley when he finds out that the museum has taken away the Arakh/Kimas exhibit which contains the said charm. The Mummies chase after the van, but Scarab beats them first and retrieves it himself for Arakh. When the Mummies meet with Kimas at Beefy Burger, Kimas tells them where the charm is, but Presley doesn't believe Kimas is telling the truth.

The following night at Fort Point, Kimas leads Ja-Kal to one of Scarab's hideouts to find the charm much to Presley's hesitation. Ja-Kal soon discovers that the hideout is fake, and he is soon attacked by Scarab, his Shabti, and Arakh. As the other Mummies try to find him on Presley's orders to try and expose Kimas, Kimas himself soon discovers that Arakh, his own father, was lying about Ja-Kal's betrayal and that he was being used as a weapon against Ja-Kal over his jealousy.

The Mummies and Scarab end up in a massive fight which soon ends with Arakh injuring Ja-Kal's arm. Kimas takes down Arakh and certifies to him that Ja-Kal was more of a father than he was. Still wearing his armor, and knowing there was no other way to send Arakh back, Kimas destroys Arakh's scorpion charm and armor, sending the two Mummies into the Western Gate. Realizing his defeat, Scarab escapes the scene. As the Western Gate appears, Ja-Kal and Presley travel alone in the Nileator, where he asks him to fire an arrow of his feelings and love for both Kimas and Arakh. Presley does so as the arrow flies into the Western Gate, ending the feud once and for all.

== Cast ==
- Dale Wilson as Ja-Kal
- Gerard Plunkett as Scarab
- Bill Switzer as Presley Carnovan
- Cree Summer as Nefer-Tina
- Graeme Kingston as Armon
- Scott McNeil as Rath and Set
- Blu Mankuma as Anubis
- Pauline Newstone as Heka
- Louise Vallance as Amanda Carnovan

== Release ==
The film was released to VHS in the United States on April 7, 1998, by Buena Vista Home Entertainment.

== Reception ==
Harlene Ellin of the Chicago Tribune gave the film one star: "Reitman's presence fails to elevate this generic, violence-laden cartoon to the top of the kids' show pyramid. Wrap the Power Rangers or Ninja Turtles in bandages, and you've got the Mummies". She criticized the film's story, writing, humor, and animation.

Randy Pitman of Video Librarian also criticized the film, citifying its repetitive nature, but praising the title for its similarities to Disney's Gargoyles.

Billboard praised the film for its minimal violence and fun nature, and compared the plot's complexity to The Terminator.
