= Madeleine Bemelmans =

Animal welfare activist (1911–2004)

Madeleine Bemelmans (née Freund; June 6, 1911 in New York City – 2004) was an animal welfare activist and the wife of Ludwig Bemelmans, who wrote and illustrated the Madeline children's picture book series. The two were married in 1935 and Ludwig named the protagonist of his books after his wife. (The change in spelling fostered frequent misspelling of his wife's name.)

Madeleine Bemelmans was a dedicated participant in founding the Animal Welfare Institute in 1951. She served as a long-time board member of the Society for Animal Protective Legislation and as the president of that organization for a time.

Bemelmans died in 2004.

Madeleine Bemelmans edited a collection of her husband's work published by Viking in 1985, Tell Them It Was Wonderful: Selected Writings.

Madeleine and Barbara Bemelmans are credited for three Ravensburger jigsaw puzzles for very young children —Madeline (1991), Madeline at the Street Fair (1995), Madeline Dress-Up and one board game, Madeline's House (1995).
