= Madeline in London =

Illustrated children's novel by Ludwig Bemelmans

- First edition (publ. Viking Press)
- Author: Ludwig Bemelmans
- Series: Madeline
- Genre: Picture book
- Set in: London
- Publisher: Viking Press
- English publication date: 1961
- Pages: 56
- ISBN: 9780670446483
- OCLC: 469422

Madeline in London is a children's picture book by Ludwig Bemelmans. It features popular children's character Madeline. It was published in the August 1961 issue of Holiday Magazine, complete with Bemelmans's drawings. It was first published in book form by Viking Press in 1961.

== Plot ==
Madeline and her class, accompanied by Miss Clavel, journey to London to visit their friend Pepito, the son of the Spanish Ambassador. Pepito used to be the neighbor of Madeline and the other students but had to move to London and is sad. The visit by his friends is a special surprise.
