= Madeline and the Gypsies =

1959 children's book by Ludwig Bemelmans

- Author: Ludwig Bemelmans
- Genre: Children's picture book
- Published: 1959
- Publisher: Viking Juvenile
- Pages: 64
- ISBN: 0-670-44682-3

Madeline and the Gypsies is a children's picture book by Ludwig Bemelmans featuring Bemelman's popular character Madeline. It was first published in 1959 by Viking Press under the Viking Juvenile imprint.

== Plot ==
The book is about Pepito, the son of the Spanish Ambassador, inviting Madeline and her fellow students to a Gypsy carnival. However, in the chaos caused by a sudden rainstorm, Miss Clavel and the other girls lose track of Madeline and Pepito, who are unintentionally left behind on the Ferris wheel. The two children find themselves guests of the gypsies, and soon, they wind up part of the carnival themselves.

== Adaptations ==
According to a review in Publishers Weekly, an element from Madeline and the Gypsies is rehashed in a different setting for the posthumously published Madeline book Madeline in America and Other Holiday Tales.

A 1966 Czech-American animated film titled Alice of Wonderland in Paris briefly adapts Madeline and the Gypsies, along with four other short stories.

In 2008, Madeline and the Gypsies was adapted into a musical, with script by Barry Kornhauser and score by Michael Koerner, which premiered at The Children's Theater Company in Minneapolis, MN.
