= Ludwig Bemelmans =

American writer and illustrator (1898–1962)

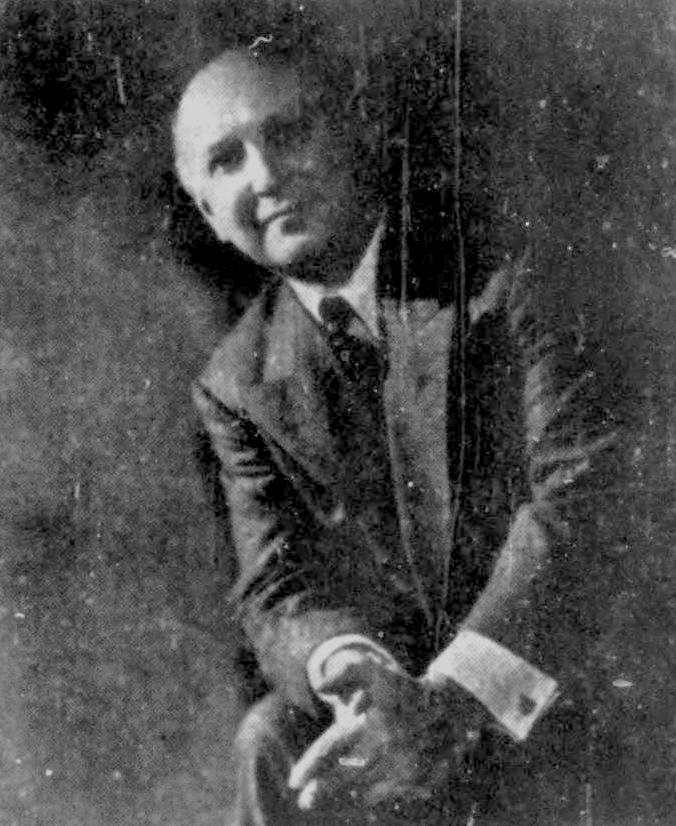
- Bemelmans in 1957
- Born: April 27, 1898; Meran, Austria-Hungary
- Died: October 1, 1962 (aged 64); New York City, U.S.
- Resting place: Arlington National Cemetery
- Occupations: Writer; illustrator
- Spouse: Madeleine Bemelmans
- Children: 1
- Relatives: John Bemelmans Marciano (grandson)
- Writing career
- Genre: Children's picture books
- Notable work: Madeline series (1939–1999)
- Notable awards: Caldecott Medal; 1954

Ludwig Bemelmans (April 27, 1898 – October 1, 1962) was an American writer and illustrator. He was known for his humorous memoirs about working in upscale hotels and restaurants of New York City and illustrations on the walls of Bemelmans Bar, as well as his 1939 picture book Madeline.

== Early life ==
Bemelmans was born on April 27, 1898, to Belgian painter and hotel owner Lambert Bemelmans and the German Frances Fischer in Meran, then part of Austria-Hungary (now Italy). He grew up in Gmunden on the Traunsee in Upper Austria. Bemelmans' first language was French and his second German.

In 1904, Lambert left his wife and Ludwig's governess, both of whom were pregnant with his children, for another woman. Bemelmans and his brother moved with their mother to her hometown of Regensburg, Germany. Bemelmans had difficulty in school, as he hated the German style of discipline. Bemelmans was apprenticed to his uncle Hans Bemelmans at a hotel in Austria, and later said in a 1941 New York Times interview that he was regularly beaten and whipped by the headwaiter. Bemelmans said he threatened to retaliate with a gun, and later shot and seriously wounded the headwaiter after he ignored Bemelmans' warning. Given the choice between reform school and emigration to the United States, Bemelmans chose the latter. The story may be fictionalized, and John Bemelmans Marciano's 1999 biography of his grandfather says that Bemelmans' uncle presented the two options because Ludwig was an incorrigible boy.

Bemelmans wrote in a 1962 letter to his friend Alma Mahler, "I have forgotten so much of youth and much of it was not experienced. In me a whole portion of it is missing—it is like a floor in a house where there is no furniture."

== United States ==
Bemelmans arrived in New York City in December 1914, and was forced to spend Christmas at Ellis Island because his father did not pick him up. He eventually lived in an apartment on the Upper West Side with his father, a jewelry designer on Maiden Lane, but soon moved out when he got a job as a busboy. Bemelmans continued work in upscale hotels and restaurants for much of his life. He joined the U.S. Army in 1917. He was not sent to Europe because of his German origins, but became an officer, rank Second Lieutenant. His 1937 memoir My War With the United States, contained English translations of his German diary he kept while in the army.

Bemelmans worked in upscale hotels and restaurants throughout the 1920s, making illustrations on the side but without lasting success. In 1926, he quit his job at the Ritz-Carlton in New York to become a full-time cartoonist. Bemelmans' cartoon series The Thrilling Adventures of the Count Bric a Brac was dropped from the New York World after six months. He associated with Ervine Metzl, a commercial artist and illustrator who is variously described as Bemelmans's friend, agent, and ghost artist.

== Writing career ==
In the early 1930s, Bemelmans met May Massee, the children's book editor at Viking Press, who became a sort of partner. Bemelmans began to publish children's books, beginning with Hansi in 1934. He published the first Madeline book in 1939; after being rejected by Viking, it was published by Simon & Schuster. The book was a great success. Bemelmans did not write a second Madeline book until 1953, when he published Madeline's Rescue. Four more books in the series were subsequently published while he was alive, and one more was published posthumously in 1999.

Up until the early 1950s, the artistic media Bemelmans worked in were pen and ink, watercolor, and gouache. As he describes in his autobiographical My Life in Art, Bemelmans had avoided oil painting because it did not permit him to produce artistic pieces quickly. However, at this point in his life, Bemelmans wanted to master the richness of oil painting. To this end, he set out to buy a property in Paris that would serve as a serious, full-blown art studio. In 1953, Bemelmans fell in love with a small bistro in Paris, La Colombe in the Île de la Cité, and bought it, intending to convert it into a studio. He painted murals therein, but the project was a disaster owing to French bureaucracy, and after two years of frustration and disappointment, Bemelmans unloaded it by selling it to Michel Valette, who converted it into a notable cabaret.

Bemelmans also wrote a number of adult books, including travel, humorous works, and novels, and wrote the story adapted into the film Yolanda and the Thief. While spending time in Hollywood, he became a close friend of interior decorator Elsie de Wolfe, Lady Mendl.

He is the namesake of Bemelmans Bar at the Carlyle Hotel in New York City, which features his mural, Central Park, on the wall. It is his only artwork on display to the public. He painted the children's dining room on Aristotle Onassis's yacht Christina (now the Christina O), for Christina Onassis, the young daughter of the magnate.

A collection of Bemelmans' short writings was published in 2004 as When you lunch with the Emperor mainly extracted from previous works which included My War with the United States (1937), Life Class (1938), Small Beer (1939), Hotel Splendide (1941), I Love You, I Love You, I Love You (1942), and "Bemelman's Italian Holiday" (1961) a collection of travel essays that originally appeared in the magazine, Holiday, to which Bemelmans had been a consistent contributor.

=== Madeline series ===
Each Madeline story begins: "In an old house in Paris, that was covered with vines, lived twelve little girls in two straight lines... the smallest one was Madeline." The girls are cared for by Miss Clavel.

Other characters include Pepito, son of the Spanish ambassador, who lives next door; Lord Cucuface, owner of the house; and Genevieve, a dog who rescues Madeline from drowning in the second book. Bemelmans published six Madeline stories in his lifetime, five as picture books and one in a magazine. A seventh was discovered after his death and published posthumously:

1. Madeline, 1939: in which Madeline must have her appendix removed.
2. Madeline's Rescue, 1953: in which Madeline is rescued from drowning by a dog (later named Genevieve). Winner of the Caldecott Medal for U.S. picture book illustration.
3. Madeline and the Bad Hat, 1956: in which the "bad hat" is Pepito, the Spanish ambassador's son, whose cruel antics outrage Madeline.
4. Madeline and the Gypsies, 1959: in which Madeline and Pepito have an adventure at a circus.
5. Madeline in London, 1961: in which Pepito moves to London, and Madeline and the girls go to visit him.
6. Madeline's Christmas, 1985: in which everyone in the house catches cold, except Madeline. (First published in McCall's in 1956).
7. Madeline in America and Other Holiday Tales, 1999: in which Madeline inherits a fortune from her American great-grandfather. The book also reveals Madeline's full name, Madeline Fogg.

=== Adaptations ===
- The first book, Madeline, was adapted as an Academy Award-nominated 1952 short animated cartoon directed by Robert Cannon for UPA and released by Columbia Pictures, also titled Madeline.
- Between 1988 and 2002, an animated Madeline series was made for television (plus one direct-to-video film Madeline: Lost in Paris), with the narration in rhyming style read by Christopher Plummer.
- A live-action Madeline film based on several of the books appeared in 1998, directed by Daisy von Scherler Mayer and starring Hatty Jones as Madeline, Frances McDormand as Miss Clavel, and Nigel Hawthorne as Lord Covington.
- Bemelmans's first novel, Madeline, was briefly satirized on a February 2020 episode of Saturday Night Live by comedian and drag performer Ru Paul.

== Now I Lay Me Down to Sleep ==
Bemelman's novel Now I Lay Me Down to Sleep (1943) was adapted by Elaine Ryan for the stage in 1949. The production was produced and directed by Hume Cronyn and combined professional actors with drama students at Stanford University. Performed at Stanford's Memorial Theatre during July 1949, the production starred Jessica Tandy and Akim Tamiroff, with Jeanne Bates, Feodor Chaliapin, Milton Parsons, and Roberta Haynes as the supporting professionals.

Cronyn sold the rights for his staging of the play to new producers Nancy Stern and George Nichols III, who after a tryout in Philadelphia, took it to Broadway. The production opened at the Broadhurst Theatre on March 2, 1950. It starred Fredric March as the General and his wife Florence Eldridge as Miss Graves, with Jacqueline Dalya, Milton Parsons, Henry Lascoe, Rick Jason, Booth Colman, Stefan Schnabel, Charles Chaplin Jr., and many others. Bemelmans was involved with the design of the production and present for the tryouts and Broadway performances.

As with many of the author's novels, Now I Lay Me Down to Sleep consists of a great many character sketches, location changes, and improbable events. Critic John Chapman identified this writing style as the ultimate problem with the stage production:

If anybody is to be reprimanded in this dispatch, it probably should be Mr. Bemelmans for being such a loose and dizzy writer--- but this would be impolite, impertinent and ungrateful, for this gay, raffish author of Now I Lay Me Down to Sleep wrote a story which is a gem of impish, sophisticated and sardonic humor. When Miss Ryan set out to translate his verbal whimseys into the more solid statements of the stage, she handed herself a whale of a job.

Reviewer Louis Scheaffer held the same opinion about the difficulty in adapting Bemelmans for the stage, recognizing that the author's characters are nothing like what theatregoers are used to, and the course of events won't fit neatly into the usual genres. However, he also held a high opinion of Bemelmans writing:

A curious, beguiling combination of innocence and sophistication, of sweet humor and shrewd, worldly insight, Bemelmans has a sunny tolerance for his fellow creature's private or personal failings that illuminates all of his writings and goes far beyond the little gray virtues generally suggested by the word "tolerance".

Despite the appreciation for Bemelmans writing by New York critics, Now I Lay Me Down to Sleep lasted for only 44 performances, closing on April 8, 1950.

== Personal life ==
Bemelmans is said to have met his future wife, Madeleine "Mimi" Freund, as a model in Metzl's studio. They had one daughter; their grandson is John Bemelmans Marciano.

Bemelmans died in New York of pancreatic cancer on October 1, 1962, at age 64, and was buried in Arlington National Cemetery.

== Books ==
- 1934: Hansi
- 1936: The Golden Basket
- 1937: My War with the United States
- 1937: The Castle Number Nine
- 1938: Life Class – An autobiographical sketch.
- 1938: Quito Express (travel book)
- 1939: Madeline
- 1939: Small Beer (humorous memoirs based on his experiences in Europe and Hollywood)
- 1940: Fifi
- 1941: At Your Service
- 1941: Hotel Splendide
- 1941: The Donkey Inside
- 1942: Rosebud
- 1942: I Love You, I Love You, I Love You
- 1943: Now I Lay Me Down to Sleep
- 1945: The Blue Danube
- 1946: Hotel Bemelmans
- 1947: A Tale of Two Glimps
- 1947: Dirty Eddie
- 1948: The Best of Times: An Account of Europe Revisited
- 1949: The Eye of God
- 1950: Sunshine: A Story about the City of New York
- 1952: How to Travel Incognito
- 1952: The Happy Place
- 1953: Father, Dear Father
- 1953: Madeline's Rescue
- 1953: The Borrowed Christmas
- 1954: The High World
- 1955: Parsley
- 1955: To the One I Love the Best – Bemelmans narrates his friendship with Elsie de Wolfe, Lady Mendl.
- 1956: Madeline and the Bad Hat
- 1957: The Woman of My Life
- 1958: My Life in Art
- 1959: Madeline and the Gypsies
- 1960: Welcome Home!
- 1960: Are You Hungry, Are You Cold
- 1960: How to Travel To Europe All to Yourself
- 1961: Italian Holiday
- 1961: Madeline in London
- 1962: Marina
- 1962: On Board Noah's Ark
- 1963: The Street Where the Heart Lies
- 1964: La Bonne Table. Excerpts and essays involving food and drink, edited by Donald and Eleanor Friede
- 1966: The Elephant Cutlet
- 1985: Tell Them It Was Wonderful: Selected Writings (compilation of various autobiographical stories, published posthumously)
- 1985: Madeline's Christmas (published 1956 in McCall's)
- 1999: Madeline in America and Other Holiday Tales
- 2004: Hotel Bemelmans (introduction by Anthony Bourdain), Overlook Press, New York
- 2004: When You Lunch with the Emperor: The Adventures Of Ludwig Bemelmans (introduction by Andrew Goodfellow) Overlook Press, New York
