= Madeline's Rescue =

Book by Ludwig Bemelmans

- First edition
- Author: Ludwig Bemelmans
- Illustrator: Ludwig Bemelmans
- Cover artist: Urpatz
- Genre: Children's book
- Publisher: Viking Press
- Publication date: 1953
- Publication place: United States

Madeline's Rescue is a children's picture book by Ludwig Bemelmans, the second in his Madeline series. Released by Viking Press, it was the recipient of the Caldecott Medal for illustration in 1954.

== Plot ==
Madeline falls into the Seine River one day and is saved by a stray dog. Miss Clavel and the twelve little girls cannot find the owner of the dog, so the girls decide to keep it and name it Genevieve. The problems start to rise when the girls compete for time with Genevieve. Big trouble arrives in their animal-loathing landlord Cucuface, who takes one look at poor Genevieve and has his driver take her away. The girls and Miss Clavel unsuccessfully look for Genevieve. Late that night, Miss Clavel wakes up and finds Genevieve in the light of the doorway. Everyone rejoices Genevieve's return. That night, the girls fight about Genevieve again, causing Miss Clavel to take Genevieve to her own room (but not before warning the girls if one more fight breaks out about Genevieve, she will be given away). Even later that night, Madeline and the girls, with Miss Clavel, find that Genevieve has given birth to eleven puppies.

== Adaptations ==
The book was adapted to television in 1991 by Cinar as a half-hour animated special on the Family Channel. The special starred the voices of Marsha Morceau as Madeline and Christopher Plummer as the narrator, and premiered on June 6. It also expands on the plot following Genevieve giving birth to the puppies with Lord Cucuface giving permission for Genevieve and her puppies to stay after growing fond of one of the puppies and adopting it.

Awards
Preceded by The Biggest Bear	Caldecott Medal recipient 1954	Succeeded by Cinderella, or the Little Glass Slipper
