= Madeline =

Children's media franchise

- The cover to the original 1939 Madeline children's book
- Created by: Ludwig Bemelmans
- Original work: Madeline (1939)

Print publications
- Book: See Madeline (book series)

Films and television
- Films: Madeline (1998); My Fair Madeline (2002); Madeline in Tahiti (2005)
- Short film: Madeline (1952 short film)
- Animated series: Madeline (1993–2001)
- Direct-to-video: Madeline: Lost in Paris (1999)

Games
- Video game: See Madeline (video game series)

Miscellaneous
- Toys: Various (dolls and playsets)

Madeline is a media franchise that originated as a series of children's books written and illustrated by Ludwig Bemelmans. The books have been adapted into numerous formats, spawning telefilms, television series and a live action feature film. The stories take place in a Catholic boarding school in Paris. The teacher, named Miss Clavel, is strict but loves the children, cares for them, and is open to their ideas.

Most of the media starts with the line "In an old house in Paris that was covered in vines, lived twelve little girls in two straight lines ..." and end with an invocation of a famous phrase used by Ethel Barrymore to rebuff curtain calls: "That's all there is, there isn't any more". The stories often are written entirely in rhyme, include simple themes of daily life, and the playful but harmless mischief of Madeline, which appeal to children and parents alike. Most of the books have several recurring themes, such as Miss Clavel turning on the light and saying: "Something is not right".

== In literature ==
Madeline was written by Ludwig Bemelmans and published in 1939. Ludwig Bemelmans wrote five sequels between 1953 and 1961. Later, books in the series were all written by Ludwig Bemelmans' grandson John Bemelmans Marciano. The books focus on 12 girls in a Catholic boarding school in Paris. Madeline is the smallest of the girls, only seven years old and the only girl with red hair. She is the bravest and most outgoing of the girls. The images seem classical and show scenery and landmarks of the location where the story takes place such as the Eiffel Tower and the Seine River.

In the first book, Madeline gets sick, is taken away to the hospital, has her appendix removed, and all the gifts she has received cause the other little girls to become envious. In Madeline's Rescue she falls down into the Seine River and brings back the dog that saved her life. In Madeline and the Bad Hat she meets Pepito, the son of the Spanish Ambassador to France, and works to convince him to change his naughty ways.

Dell Comics published a Four Colour Comics issue in 1942 titled Ludwig Bemelmans' Madeline & Genevieve.

== In film ==
=== Animated shorts ===
The earliest appearance in the cinema was in the 1952 animated short Madeline, produced by United Productions of America (UPA) and directed by Bobe Cannon and John Hubley. It was nominated for the 1952 Academy Award for Best Short Subject (Cartoons), but lost to Tom and Jerry's 75th cartoon Johann Mouse.

In 1959, William L. Snyder's Rembrandt Films produced animated adaptations of Madeline's Rescue, Madeline and the Bad Hat and Madeline and the Gypsies for the educational film market. The latter two were featured, along with other similar adaptations of children's books, in Snyder and Gene Deitch's 1966 theatrical feature Alice of Wonderland in Paris.

=== Live-action film ===
A live-action feature adaptation of Madeline, shot in France by Jaffilms but produced in Britain with predominantly British accents, was released in 1998 by TriStar Pictures. It starred Hatty Jones as the title character, Frances McDormand as Miss Clavel, and a supporting cast with British actors Ben Daniels and Nigel Hawthorne. Its script encompassed the plots of four of the books. Original music was composed by Michel Legrand and Carly Simon sang the theme song "In Two Straight Lines". It was directed by Daisy Mayer. The 1998 live action version significantly differed from the TV series and the main book continuity. The filming location of the boarding house and neighbouring Spanish Ambassador's house, can be found at Avenue du Colifichet, Croissy-sur-Seine, although both houses are now obscured by hedging and fencing.

=== Upcoming animated film ===
In February 2026, an animated film was announced to be in development from Sycamore Studios.

== In television ==
In 1960, the Madeline stories were adapted to a one-hour color episode for the NBC series The Shirley Temple Show. In 1988, DIC Entertainment adapted the first book into an animated television special for HBO. Between 1990 and 1991, Cinar and France Animation produced animated adaptations of the other five original books for The Family Channel. In 1993, DIC produced a Madeline television series of twenty episodes, which also aired on the Family Channel, and in 1995, an additional 13 episodes were produced by DIC for ABC, under the title The New Adventures of Madeline. Between 2000 and 2001, DIC produced 26 episodes for the Disney Channel. It features songs written by various songwriters, composers and lyricists. According to some, this rendition gave the characters their iconic designs.

== Audiobooks ==
Madeline audiobooks have been appearing since the early 1970s as vinyl records. The record typically consists of a mixture of stories and songs.

The first soundtrack for the TV series was Madeline's Favorite Songs, released in 1995. It contains 16 tracks of music composed by Joe Raposo or Jeffrey Zahn with lyrics by Judy Rothman from the DIC and Cinar specials. The second soundtrack, Hats off to Madeline, was released in 1996. It contained 17 tracks of music from the 1993 and 1995 episodes, written and composed by various songwriters. In 2002, the latest Madeline soundtrack to date, Sing-A-Long With Madeline, was released, featuring 27 tracks of music from the 2001 episodes, and they were also written by various songwriters, composers, and lyricists.

== Video games ==
Between 1995 and 1999, ten Madeline-themed educational point-and-click computer games were released by various developers.

== Toys ==
Madeline toys were initially produced by Eden Toys LLC, since acquired by Learning Curve. Most popular during the 1990s was a Madeline rag doll, with a signature half-smile and scar from the appendectomy that corresponds with the story from the book. Eden's Madeline Doll House received the Toy of the Year Award for Best Specialty Toy at the first annual Toy Of The Year Awards in 2000.

== DVD releases ==
=== Films ===
| Title | Region 1 release date | Region 2 release date | Distributor(s) |
|---|---|---|---|
| Madeline | 15 December 1998 | 18 October 1998 | TriStar Pictures |
| My Fair Madeline | 3 February 2009 | 1 October 2003 | MGM Home Entertainment |
| Madeline: Lost in Paris | 13 April 2010 | 15 June 2011 | Shout! Factory |
