= Rainbow Brite =

American media franchise

- Created by: Hallmark Cards

Print publications
- Comics: Rainbow Brite

Films and television
- Film: Rainbow Brite and the Star Stealer
- Animated series: 1984 series 2014 series

Miscellaneous

Rainbow Brite (Note: Also known in Japan as Magical Girl Rainbow Brite (魔法少女レインボーブライト, Mahō Shōjo Reinbō Buraito).) is an American media franchise by Hallmark Cards, introduced in 1984. The animated Rainbow Brite television series first aired in 1984, the same year Hallmark licensed Rainbow Brite to Mattel for a range of dolls and other merchandise. A theatrical feature-length film, Rainbow Brite and the Star Stealer, was released by Warner Bros. Pictures in 1985. The franchise was rebooted in 2014 with a three-part mini-series released on Hallmark's online streaming video service, Hallmark+. A line of new merchandise by Hallmark online and in its shops debuted in 2015.

== Premise ==
A young girl named Wisp is brought by a mysterious voice to a gray, desolate land with the mission to bring color to this fictional world by locating the Sphere of Light. Along the way, she befriends a furry creature (called a sprite) named Twink and a horse named Starlite and finds a mysterious baby who turns out to be the key to her mission. With the help of her new friends, Wisp locates the legendary Color Belt and rescues the seven Color Kids, who had been trapped by the King of Shadows. Using the Color Belt, Wisp and the Sphere of Light defeat the King of Shadows, liberate the sprites, and bring color and beauty to the land, henceforth called Rainbow Land. Wisp is renamed Rainbow Brite in honor of her new role as the leader of the Color Kids, who are together in charge of all the colors in the universe.

The Color Kids spread color across the universe from the Color Console inside the Color Castle. Each Color Kid is in charge of their respective color, has a personal sprite and manages a number of like-colored sprites that mine Color Crystals from the nearby Color Caves. These crystals are processed into Star Sprinkles which are the essential components to brightening and coloring any object or place. The Star Sprinkles also power Rainbow Brite's Color Belt, which manifests a powerful multicolored energy force she uses to fight evil and help Starlite travel on. Rainbow Brite and the Color Kids' mission is often complicated by the likes of Murky Dismal, his sidekick Lurky, and other villains. Brian, a boy from Earth, sometimes assisted Rainbow Brite in her adventures.

In the film, Rainbow Brite and the Star Stealer, the setting expands to include the diamond planet, Spectra. All the light in the universe must pass through Spectra before coming to Earth, which soon falls into a wintry darkness when the diamond-obsessed Dark Princess decides to steal Spectra for her own. Rainbow Brite and her horse, Starlite, must team with Spectra's boy warrior, Krys, and his robotic horse, On-X, to defeat the powers of darkness and save Spectra, Earth, and the universe.

== Production ==
Hallmark began work on Rainbow Brite several years prior to the character's animated debut in the syndicated prime-time television special, "Peril in the Pits", which was first aired on June 27, 1984. The company introduced the character at the 1984 North American International Toy Fair and during that same year began a $15 million marketing campaign that predominantly focused on television advertisements. Hallmark licensed the character to Mattel for dolls, merchandise, and promotional materials that included a safety coloring book.

Later, a pair of two-part specials was produced: "The Mighty Monstromurk Menace" and "The Beginning of Rainbowland".

A theatrical feature-length film, Rainbow Brite and the Star Stealer, was released by Warner Bros. Pictures in 1985. The specials became part of DIC's weekly syndicated Kideo TV block of programming starting in April 1986, which were followed up with eight more episodes for a total of thirteen, which is one season in American television, and were rerun until the end of March 1987, after which the show was replaced on the Kideo TV schedule by Lady Lovely Locks & the Pixietails. All were published on VHS videotapes in the United States and other countries, along with two live-action programs. One of these was a program intended for use at kids' birthday parties ("It's Your Birthday Party"); the other was made on location at the San Diego Zoo ("San Diego Zoo Adventure").

== Merchandise ==
=== First generation: Mattel ===
For the first Rainbow Brite generation (1984–1987), Mattel produced the dolls and many of the toys. Other Rainbow Brite licensed merchandise was produced by various companies. This included many story and activity books published by Western Publishing (Little Golden Books), a number of puzzles, a line of costume jewelry, banks and suitcases by Kat's Meow, clothes, toys, games, doll and child furniture, radios, child cosmetics, linen, towels, personal care items, lamps, figurines, VHS videocassettes, audio cassettes, vinyl records, bicycles, bedding, curtains and other merchandise sold in the United States, Canada and the United Kingdom. The rest of Europe saw a smaller variety of merchandise, though this varied from country to country.

Televised commercials for Mattel's Rainbow Brite dolls frequently featured the song, "Over the Rainbow", from The Wizard of Oz, often with altered lyrics or arrangements. Child actors Tracey Gold, Kellie Martin and Heather O'Rourke, famous for their roles in 1980s television and film, also appeared.

=== Second generation: Up, Up and Away ===
The second Rainbow Brite generation (1996–1997) greatly differed from any generation before or since. It used the Rainbow Brite name but not the same characters or backstory. The master license was held by Up, Up and Away, a company which is no longer in business.

Rainbow Brite no longer had anything do with making colors and was now in charge of diversity. Although this version did have rainbow-colored hair, the characters resembled real-world children more than their previous animated and doll counterparts. In the second generation's story, Rainbow Brite had four friends, called the Color Crew, which included Amber (Latina), Cerise (Asian), Ebony (African-American) and Indigo (Middle Eastern, the only character name borrowed from the original Color Kids).

The Canadian importer was Irvine, a company which is currently still in business, and their product packaging was printed in both French and English texts. Ideal Toy Company was the importer for most of Western Europe, though Euro Play imported the line for Germany. The large doll was also distributed in Italy by GiG with only Italian text on the box. There were no other toys or accessories for the second generation dolls other than additional pots of Color-Glo Paint, which were sold in the United States, Canada, Europe and Australia. There was also a version of at least the large doll in a box with Spanish-only text. Another 15" Rainbow Brite doll with a Color Glo Bear and paint set was prototyped, as was a black version, which was produced in very small numbers, but only the black version was ever produced and then in very limited numbers. There was a Gen 2B which had simplified packaging and outfits as an effort to keep the line going by cutting costs. The second generation had nowhere near the success the first generation had at retail and was discontinued after less than two years on the market.

=== Third generation: Toy Play ===
The third Rainbow Brite generation (2003–2005) was also the 20th anniversary release. The master toy licensee was Toy Play, a defunct subsidiary of The Betesh Group. The parent company is still in business. Nick Jr. was the television network that advertised the line. Hot Topic was the lead merchandiser with a unique Rainbow Brite doll not manufactured by Toy Play and many items of women's clothing, accessories and stationery.

Without being an exact copy of the originals, this generation returned to the look and feel of the Mattel line. Toy Play followed the first generation's character roll out, producing Rainbow Brite, Red Butler, Canary Yellow, and Patty O'Green characters, but no more Color Kids followed. Starlite, Puppy Brite and the Sprites were also represented in various merchandise.

Toy Play was the first (and so far only) merchandiser to produce a Color Castle playset, the Light Up Musical Castle, which included small articulated figurines of Rainbow Brite, Red Butler, Twink and Puppy Brite. The playset's box showed pictures of forthcoming product (a Rainbow Brite and Friends Sprites' village playset, an in-scale Starlite with brushable mane, as well as figurine 2-packs to include Rainbow Brite and Twink, Red Butler and Romeo, Patty O'Green and Lucky, Canary Yellow and Spark, and Murky Dismal and Lurky) though these were never produced. There was also a wide range of other merchandise, mostly clothing, that was available during Gen 3.

=== Fourth generation: Playmates Toys ===
The fourth Rainbow Brite generation (2009–2010) was the 25th anniversary release and was accompanied by a series of web-episodes produced by Animax Entertainment that were available to stream on www.RainbowBrite.com, which no longer exists. The master toy license belonged to Playmates Toys and their line of Rainbow Brite toys was expected to be in stores in the fall of 2009. Production delays saw the line actually debut in stores on December 24 of that year, which missed the 2009 holiday shopping season.

=== Hallmark+ ===
A three-part animated miniseries was launched on November 6, 2014 by video on demand site Hallmark+. The reboot showcased updated character designs for the cast, and starred Emily Osment as the voice of Rainbow Brite and Molly Ringwald as the voice of Dark Princess.

=== Fifth generation: Hallmark Toys ===
Hallmark introduced the fifth generation of Rainbow Brite toys, along with clothing and other merchandise in July 2015. A limited edition line of Rainbow Brite Itty Bittys featuring Rainbow Brite, Twink, Champ, O.J., Lucky and I.Q. arrived first, each produced in limited quantities of 500 units. The demand led to Hallmark reissuing the Itty Bittys with slightly revised designs in much greater numbers along with the first Rainbow Brite Itty Bittys boxed set featuring Red Butler, Romeo, Indigo and Hammy. These items were followed by an 8" Twink plush and 11" Starlite plush in September 2015, as well as a 16" Rainbow Brite doll that November.

A Rainbow Brite comic was published by Dynamite Entertainment for five issues from October 2018 to February 2019.

=== Upcoming sixth generation ===
A CGI-animated series and theatrical film are in development as of 2024. The film will be produced by Hallmark, Cake Entertainment, Crayola Studios and Original Film with Neal H. Moritz and Toby Ascher on board. Crayola will also handle the licensing and merchandising for the new series.
