= Rainbow Brite and the Star Stealer =

1985 film by Kimio Yabuki and Bernard Deyriès

- Theatrical release poster
- Directed by: Kimio Yabuki; Bernard Deyriès
- Written by: Howard R. Cohen; Jean Chalopin
- Produced by: Jean Chalopin; Andy Heyward; Victor Villegas
- Starring: Bettina Bush; Patrick Fraley; Peter Cullen; Robbie Lee; Andre Stojka; David Mendenhall; Rhonda Aldrich; Les Tremayne; Mona Marshall; Jonathan Harris; Marissa Mendenhall; Scott Menville; Charles Adler; David Workman
- Edited by: Yutaka Chikura
- Music by: Haim Saban; Shuki Levy
- Production company: DIC Enterprises
- Distributed by: Warner Bros.
- Release date: November 15, 1985
- Running time: 85 minutes
- Country: United States
- Language: English
- Box office: $4.9 million

Rainbow Brite and the Star Stealer is a 1985 American animated fantasy film directed by Bernard Deyriès and Kimio Yabuki. The film was produced by DIC Enterprises and Hallmark Cards, and was released in the United States on November 15, 1985, by Warner Bros. It is the only film to feature the greeting card character Rainbow Brite; she also appeared in a few television specials prior to its release, and later in a Kideo TV series. In the film, Rainbow Brite tries to bring spring to an Earth that is already facing a perpetual winter. She must stop a wicked princess who wants all of Spectra, a planet-sized diamond through which all the light in the universe must pass.

The film was panned by critics and grossed $4.9 million at the United States box office, after opening with $1.8 million.

== Plot ==
When Rainbow Brite (Bettina Bush) and her magical horse, Starlite (Andre Stojka), go to Earth to start spring, they meet Stormy (Marissa Mendenhall), another magical girl who controls Winter with her horse, Skydancer (Peter Cullen). She, however, does not want to end her winter fun, so Rainbow battles her for control over the season. She proves to be no match for Rainbow and Starlite, who outrun her and head off to Earth. When they arrive, they meet up with Brian (Scott Menville), the only boy on Earth who can "see" them. Once Rainbow tries to start spring, however, her power weakens and Winter remains. Brian becomes worried that Spring will never come and senses that all of humanity is losing hope. Even Rainbow is confused. Reassuring Brian that they will do what they can to return Spring, Rainbow and Starlite return to Rainbowland.

Rainbow is paid a visit by On-X (Pat Fraley), a strange robotic horse with rockets for legs. On-X delivers a message that the leader of Spectra, Orin, has gone missing. Rainbow takes the mission to find Orin and later learns that Spectra is dimming as the result of a massive net being woven around its surface. The net is being made so that a selfish princess (Rhonda Aldrich), known only as the "Dark Princess", can steal Spectra, "the greatest diamond in all the universe", for herself, and tow it back to her world with her massive spaceship. The native Sprites of Spectra, enslaved by Glitterbots under the princess' control, are being forced to weave the net. Rainbow must stop the princess' plan before all life on Earth is frozen solid by an endless Winter.

Helping Rainbow and Starlite is Krys (David Mendenhall), a boy from Spectra who believes he can take on the princess and save his home world by himself without the help of a "dumb girl". When they meet Orin, he tries to make them work together to stop the princess. He tells them that they can only destroy her by combining their own powers against her.

Getting in the way of their mission is the sinister Murky Dismal (Peter Cullen) and his bumbling assistant, Lurky (Pat Fraley), who are lavishing in the new gloom created by the darkening of Spectra, as well as trying to steal Rainbow's magical color belt. After dodging Murky, Rainbow and Krys enter the princess' castle and try to convince her that what she is doing will destroy the universe, but she is determined to have Spectra for herself and traps them instead after she takes Rainbow's belt. They escape the dungeon when Starlite retrieves Rainbow's belt, but the Dark Princess, now enraged, uses her powerful crystal to create a vortex to send Rainbow, Krys, Starlite and On-X to a prison planet. Sargeant Zombo (David Workman) captures Starlite, while Rainbow was attacked by humanoid lizard creatures who take Krys and On-X to Zombo's castle.

Rainbow meets Orin there who explains that Krys and Rainbow must destroy the Princess' crystal—as that is the source of her powers. They find an unguarded entrance to the palace and find the Princess in her throne room. In the midst of a duel with the Princess, Murky and Lurky crash their ship into the throne room. This distracts the Princess long enough for Rainbow and Krys to destroy her power crystal. The defeated Princess runs to her spaceship with the intention of crashing into Spectra to destroy it, but Rainbow uses her rainbow to deflect the spacecraft away from the diamond planet, prompting it to explode.

The enslaved Sprites are freed and immediately destroy the net so that Spectra radiates its magical light once again. On Earth, a warm spring finally arrives as life returns there and Rainbow returns to Rainbowland, finding her friends are back to normal.

== Cast ==
- Bettina Bush as Rainbow Brite
- Patrick Fraley as Lurky, On-X, Buddy Blue, Dog, Guard, Spectran, Sluthrie, Glitterbot
- Peter Cullen as Murky Dismal, Castle Monster, Glitterbot, Guard, Skydancer, Slurthie
- Robbie Lee as Twink, Shy Violet, Indigo, La La Orange, Spectran, Sprites
- Andre Stojka as Starlite, Wizard, Spectran
- David Mendenhall as Krys
- Rhonda Aldrich as The Princess, The Creature
- Les Tremayne as Orin, Bombo, TV Announcer
- Mona Marshall as Red Butler, Witch, Spectran, Castle Creature, Patty O'Green, Canary Yellow
- Jonathan Harris as Count Blogg
- Marissa Mendenhall as Stormy
- Scott Menville as Brian
- Charles Adler as Popo
- David Workman as Sargeant Zombo

== Production ==
Rainbow Brite and the Star Stealer was the second feature film made by DIC Enterprises, who had earlier success with their first TV shows, Inspector Gadget and The Littles. DIC was hired by Hallmark Cards to produce the first three syndicated specials centering on Rainbow Brite. Their success led to the production of a feature film based on the toy.

The project was directed by French animator Bernard Deyriès, well known at the time for DIC's science-fiction series Ulysses 31 and The Mysterious Cities of Gold (both also animated by Japanese studios), and Japanese partner Kimio Yabuki, a legendary animator at Toei Animation and former cohort of Hayao Miyazaki. The film's art director, Rich Rudish, had been a staff member of Hallmark since 1964.

The music was composed by Haim Saban and Shuki Levy, who produced various music for cartoons (most notably Inspector Gadget). Story co-writer Howard Cohen wrote the lyrics from the songs: "Brand New Day" and "Rainbow Brite and Me".

The film was produced in only three months, at that time the quickest on record for an animated feature. While the U.S. unit contributed to the film's production, some Japanese companies took on animation outsourcing duties (as was often the case with DIC's productions of the time), among them Cockpit, Zaendou, Doga Kobo, Tama, Crocus and Peacock.

== Release ==
During Rainbow Brite and the Star Stealer's initial release, screenings were exclusive to matinee engagements—"three shows a day", according to Warner Bros.' president of distribution Barry Reardon. Opening at seventh place with US$1.8 million, and running for just five weeks at a 1,090-venue maximum, the film grossed US$4,889,971 at the North American box-office, months before a 13-episode syndicated series appeared on DIC's Kideo TV block. A tie-in comic book to the film was issued by DC Comics.

As an additional promotional tie in for the film, Ralston Purina (makers of Rainbow Brite cereal) offered a limited time mail-in offer for full size Star Stealer theatrical posters.

The film was first released on VHS and Betamax video formats by Warner Home Video in the United States and Canada on March 17, 1986. Warner reissued the VHS cassette in 2002 and once more in November 2004, and also that same month released the film on DVD in Region 1 territories with a remastered "open matte" 1.33:1 transfer. Bonus features on the DVD included a sing-along version of the opening song, "Brand New Day", and a "Find the Missing Color Belt" game, as extras. All of these releases have since gone out of print.

== Reception ==
Reviews for Rainbow Brite and the Star Stealer were mixed to negative. Janet Maslin of The New York Times said in her short review that "[it] isn't a movie; it's a marketing tool". She was referring to animated fare which, at the time, had just begun the practice of cashing in on pre-sold toy lines. Michael Blowen of The Boston Globe called the film an "incompetently crafted that it makes the Saturday-morning cartoons seem like Disney classics". Stuart Fisher, a contributor for Jerry Beck's Animated Movie Guide, said: "Sorry, kids, the star stealer was here", referring to the zero stars given to it in the book. The Family Guide to Movies on Video called it "not strong on imagination or substance[,] but lots of color and action designed to sell dolls to the toddler set". On Rotten Tomatoes, it earned a 0% rating based on reviews from 7 critics.

== See also ==
- Lists of animated films
