= Rainbow Brite (comics) =

Publication information
- Publisher: DC Comics; Dynamite Entertainment
- Schedule: Monthly
- Format: Ongoing series
- Publication date: October 2018 - February 2019
- No. of issues: 5
- Main character: Rainbow Brite

Creative team
- Written by: Jeremy Whitley
- Artist: Brittney Williams

Rainbow Brite is a comic based on the 1980s television show.

A 1985 tie-in comic book to Rainbow Brite and the Star Stealer was issued by DC Comics.

== Reception ==
Rainbow Brite gained a mostly positive reception from critics.
