= The Get Along Gang =

Television series and greeting card franchise

The Get Along Gang is a group of characters created in 1983 by Tony Byrd, Tom Jacobs, Ralph Shaffer, Linda Edwards, Muriel Fahrion, and Mark Spangler for American Greetings' toy design and licensing division, "Those Characters from Cleveland" (now Cloudco Entertainment), for a series of greeting cards. The Get Along Gang is a group of six pre-adolescent anthropomorphic animal characters in the fictional town of Green Meadow, who form a club that meets in an abandoned caboose and who have various adventures whose upbeat stories were intended to show the importance of teamwork and friendship. The success of the greeting card line led to a Saturday morning television series, which aired on CBS for 13 episodes in the 1984–1985 season, with reruns showing from January to June 1986.

== Characters ==
The Get Along Gang franchise was loosely inspired by Hal Roach's Our Gang series of short films. The core six members of the gang appeared frequently in merchandising and the show. The other six made fewer appearances in the series, but were regulars in merchandising.

=== Protagonists ===
- Montgomery Moose (voiced by Sparky Marcus, Charles Haid (pilot)) – The leader of the Get Along Gang.
- Dotty Dog (voiced by Bettina Bush) – A cheerleader dog and second-in-command of the gang.
- Woolma Lamb (voiced by Georgi Irene) – An aspiring ballerina sheep.
- Zipper Cat (voiced by Robbie Lee) – An athletic feline who excels at sports.
- Portia Porcupine (voiced by Sherry Lynn) – The youngest member of the gang.
- Bingo Beaver (voiced by Scott Menville) – A novice prankster and gambler beaver.
- Braker Turtle (voiced by Frank Welker/Don Messick) – A smart and sensible problem-solver.
- Rocco Rabbit – A reformed bully with a tough exterior.
- Rudyard Lion – A foreign-exchange student.
- Flora Fox – An avid botanist and photographer.
- Bernice Bear – A very sensible girl who likes keeping things neat and tidy.
- Lolly Squirrel – The rich daughter of the candy factory owner.

=== Antagonists ===
- Catchum Crocodile (voiced by Timothy Gibbs) – The show's main antagonist. He is a constant troublemaker who takes what he wants with no regards to anyone else.
- Leland Lizard (voiced by Nicky Katt) – Catchum's sidekick.

=== Background characters ===
- Officer Growler (voiced by Don Messick) – A bulldog police officer.
- Mr. Hoofnagel (voiced by Don Messick) – An old goat who owns the local ice cream parlor.
- Miss Deering (voiced by Sherry Lynn) – A deer and the teacher of the gang's class.
- Susie (voiced by Sherry Lynn) – Bingo's pen pal, a squirrel who likes exercise.
- Mayor Bascombe Badger (voiced by Don Messick) – The mayor of Green Meadow.
- Schneider Squirrel – Lolly's father and owner of the candy factory. Schneider appeared only in the comic books.
- Hocus Hare and Pocus Possum – A pair of magicians.

== TV series ==
The Get Along Gang
- Created by: Tony Byrd, Tom Jacobs, Ralph Shaffer, Linda Edwards, Muriel Fahrion and Mark Spangler for Those Characters from Cleveland
- Starring: Sparky Marcus; Bettina Bush; Sherry Lynn; Robbie Lee; Georgi Irene; Scott Menville; Timothy Gibbs; Nicky Katt; Frank Welker; Don Messick; Chuck McCann
- Composers: Shuki Levy; Haim Saban
- Countries of origin: United States; France; Canada (pilot episode)
- Original language: English
- No. of episodes: 13 (26 segments) + pilot

Production
- Executive producers: Andy Heyward; Jean Chalopin
- Running time: 22 minutes (2 11-minute segments, excluding the pilot)
- Production companies: DIC Audiovisuel; Those Characters From Cleveland; Nelvana (pilot episode)

Original release
- Network: Nickelodeon (Pilot); CBS/Syndication (TV series)
- Release: May 6 – December 8, 1984

Canadian studio Nelvana, in association with Scholastic Entertainment, Those Characters from Cleveland, and LBS produced a pilot episode of The Get Along Gang, which was broadcast on the Nickelodeon cable network on May 6, 1984. The pilot featured the members of the gang trying to win a scavenger hunt, despite Catchum's cheating and their own competition-fueled infighting. Although all twelve gang members were involved, only the six core members had speaking roles. Among the voice talents in the pilot were Charles Haid (then of Hill Street Blues) as Montgomery and Dave Thomas (fresh from his days on SCTV) as Leland. John Sebastian, famous for working for Nelvana at the time, wrote and sang for the pilot.

After the pilot episode, production of the series was handed over to DIC Audiovisuel, a French animation studio. The show also was taken off Nickelodeon and moved to CBS. Thirteen half-hour episodes were produced, each containing two eleven-minute segments. As with the pilot, the focus was on the six core members of the gang, with the other six members making very sporadic appearances. Out of those six, only Braker Turtle had a regular speaking role.

=== Rebroadcast ===
From September 1986 until August 1987, all thirteen DIC-produced episodes were rerun as part of a short-lived syndicated cartoon package called Kideo TV.

=== Other merchandise ===
The brief series spawned a large range of merchandise and spin-off projects including stuffed toys and action figures made by Tomy, and a series of storybooks published by Scholastic Press. The Tomy action figure line and Scholastic Press books actually lasted longer than the cartoon series itself.

The characters were also adapted into comic books. In America, their series, which ran for six bi-monthly issues in 1985 and 1986, was published by Marvel Comics' Star Comics imprint. In the United Kingdom, Marvel UK published a weekly Get Along Gang comic, which ran for 93 issues from April 1985 until January 1987.

=== Reception and criticism ===
In 1986, Ralph Novak of People Weekly observed that Nelvana's pilot special "is enlivened by the music of John Sebastian and some relatively sophisticated (for television) animation. Cartoon violence is only the most innocuous sort."

The series was the product of an era in the 1980s when television watchgroups held great influence over children's programming, demanding that shows intended for young viewers emphasize positive values rather than violence or conflict. Consequently, critics of the series accused it of "enforcing" the importance of group harmony over individualism.

In an August 8, 1997 article written by television/cartoon writer Mark Evanier for his website, POVonline, in which he recalled writing for the Dungeons & Dragons cartoon series, which premiered one year before The Get Along Gang (and aired alongside it on the CBS lineup), Evanier noted:

[Television watchgroups] all seek to make kidvid more enriching and redeeming, at least by their definitions, and at the time, they had enough clout to cause the networks to yield. Consultants were brought in and we, the folks who were writing cartoons, were ordered to include certain "pro-social" morals in our shows. At the time, the dominant "pro-social" moral was as follows: The group is always right...the complainer is always wrong.

This was the message of far too many eighties' cartoon shows. If all your friends want to go get pizza and you want a burger, you should bow to the will of the majority and go get pizza with them. There was even a show for one season on CBS called The Get-Along Gang, which was dedicated unabashedly to this principle. Each week, whichever member of the gang didn't get along with the others learned the error of his or her ways....

...I don't believe you should always go along with the group. What about thinking for yourself? What about developing your own personality and viewpoint? What about doing things because you decide they're the right thing to do, not because the majority ruled and you got outvoted?

=== Decline and attempted revival ===
In mid-to-late 1985, the toy and greeting card sales began to decline, the first sign of the series' popularity waning. A few products (plastic figurines, some greeting cards, and a coloring book) were released, with Hocus Hare and Pocus Possum joining the Gang at the tail-end of the series' run. The greeting card, toy line and US by-monthly comic book series had all ended by 1987.

In mid-2004, the Joester Loria Group, a licensing and marketing agency, announced the addition of The Get Along Gang to its stable of classic properties. Plans called for the availability of merchandise, such as clothing, toys, games and home decor; however, this relaunch never materialized.

In 2005, American Greetings started plans for an official relaunch of the franchise, which was going to feature six new characters: Mogo (a moose), Reagan (a dog), Hatch (a cat), Mayfield (a lamb) and Domino (a beaver), and an elderly porcupine named Mrs. Bristlemore. There was even a CGI pilot in development at Richcrest Animation, an unfinished version of which has been posted online. However, for unknown reasons, the planned revival was shelved by late 2007, shortly after American Greetings refused to approve the official DVD release of the series.

=== Home entertainment releases ===
Karl-Lorimar released the Nelvana pilot on VHS shortly after it premiered on television in 1984. During the show's run, Kideo Video released several VHS tapes that included select episodes.

In April 2007, plans for a DVD release of the series were announced by S'More Entertainment; however, the planned release was announced to be cancelled a month later because American Greetings would not approve it. Before the announcement of the cancellation, a representative of S'More stated that it was unlikely the release would include the pilot episode, since it involved royalty issues with Nelvana and John Sebastian.

On July 19, 2011, Mill Creek Entertainment released The Best of The Get Along Gang, a 1-disc set featuring 10 of the 13 half-hour episodes (20 of the 26 individual stories). The remaining episodes were released as bonus material on other Mill Creek DVD releases in 2012.

Camp Get Along and School's Out are included as a bonus feature on Mill Creek's DVD release of Heathcliff: Season One, Volume One, released in February 2012.

=== In other countries ===
While the characters' popularity was generally strong only in the United States, the series was released in several countries and dubbed into multiple languages. In Spanish, the series was translated as La Pandilla Feliz (The Happy Gang) and aired on channels in Colombia, Mexico, Costa Rica, Venezuela and Chile, but did not have the same impact or popularity of other 1980s cartoons. In Brazil the series was translated as A Nossa Turma (Our Gang) and was a modest success running on SBT during the late 1980s and early 1990s. In France, it was known as Les Amichaines.

The animated series also aired in the United Kingdom in 1985 on TV-am, while a few of the ITV region channels also broadcast the series, where it was a modest success, alongside generating merchandise sales in the country. A weekly comic book series in the United Kingdom attained reasonable popularity, running for 93 issues from April 1985. It was then merged with the Care Bears comic in January 1987, until the latter was discontinued in 1989. All other merchandise in the UK was discontinued in early 1987. The Scholastic book line also continued for some time afterwards, whilst repeats of the animated series continued to be part of the UK television network Channel 4's weekend morning schedule for a time, but both of these gradually diminished after a few years. The franchise had completely disappeared in the UK by 1993.

=== Episode guide ===
==== Nelvana ====
Pilot: The Adventures of the Get Along Gang (May 6, 1984)

- The gang participates in their town's annual scavenger hunt, but the stakes are made even higher when Bingo makes a bet with Catchum that, if Catchum wins, he and Leland get the gang's clubhouse.

==== DIC ====
| No. | Title | Original release date |
|---|---|---|
| 1 | "Zipper's Millions / Half a Map Is Better Than None" | September 15, 1984 |
Zipper's Millions: Zipper learns that he's to inherit a large fortune, but must claim it by noon.; Half a Map Is Better Than None: The gang find a treasure map but Catchum learns about it too.
| 2 | "Caboose on the Loose / Montgomery's Mechanical Marvel" | September 22, 1984 |
Caboose on the Loose: Catchum steals the clubhouse and Bingo's attempt to get it back results in it rolling away.; Montgomery's Mechanical Marvel: Montgomery builds a robot moose named Hermie for the science fair but it's sabotaged by Catchum, causing Hermie to go on a rampage.
| 3 | "Head in the Clouds / Hunt for the Beast" | September 29, 1984 |
Head in the Clouds: The gang enter a kite-flying competition.; Hunt for the Beast: The gang end up in the mountains where Zipper is taken by a strange beast.
| 4 | "Woolma's Birthday / The Get Along Detectives" | October 6, 1984 |
Woolma's Birthday: Woolma runs away, thinking her friends forgot her birthday, and befriends a skunk carny.; The Get Along Detectives: The gang become detectives and search for crook Sammy the Sneak.
| 5 | "The Get Along Gang Go Hollywood / Them's the Brakes" | October 13, 1984 |
The Get Along Gang Go Hollywood: Montgomery's uncle Marty comes to town to shoot a movie but is framed for bank robbery.; Them's the Brakes: While meeting Dottie's cousin Wilton, the gang ends up in a mine that's haunted by a ghost.
| 6 | "A Pinch of This and a Dash of That / Bingo's Tale" | October 20, 1984 |
A Pinch of This and a Dash of That: Montgomery creates an anti-gravity formula and Bingo tries to sell it.; Bingo's Tale: Bingo must overcome his fear of water to stop the dam from breaking.
| 7 | "Engineer Roary / Pick of the Litter" | October 27, 1984 |
Engineer Roary: The gang work to save the travel museum.; Pick of the Litter: The gang pick up trash so the swamp won't be the site of a new dump but Catchum keeps messing it up.
| 8 | "Nose for News / The Lighthouse Pirates" | November 3, 1984 |
Nose for News: The gang and Catchum hunt for stories that'll make them junior reporters.; The Lighthouse Pirates: Zipper and Bingo get caught in the middle of a gang of crooks hiding in the lighthouse.
| 9 | "The Wrong Stuff / Uneasy Rider" | November 10, 1984 |
The Wrong Stuff: The gang help Mr. Hoofnagel relive his glory days as a pilot.; Uneasy Rider: Portia takes over Braker's paper route for money to buy a bike.
| 10 | "The Get Along Gang Minus One / Camp Get Along" | November 17, 1984 |
The Get Along Gang Minus One: Bingo learns that he's moving away but the others don't believe him.; Camp Get Along: Both halves of the gang go camping and the girls fare better than the boys.
| 11 | "Bingo's Pen Pal / Follow the Leader" | November 24, 1984 |
Bingo's Pen Pal: Bingo's athletic pen pal Susie comes to town and thinks that Zipper is Bingo.; Follow the Leader: Catchum takes over the school's parade float in a scheme to get free food.
| 12 | "School's Out / The Bullies" | December 1, 1984 |
School's Out: Catchum and Leland frame the gang for slacking on a test and they plot revenge.; The Bullies: The gang run afoul of the Pig sisters and Catchum escalates the animosity between them.
| 13 | "That's the Way the Cookie Crumbles / Snowbound Showdown" | December 8, 1984 |
That's the Way the Cookie Crumbles: The gang start a cookie-selling business but Catchum and Leland sow discontent among them.; Snowbound Showdown: The gang partake in winter fun while Zipper finds a rival in Officer Growler's nephew.
