= Rainbow Brite (2014 TV series) =

Three-part animated series

- Voices of: Emily Osment; Molly Ringwald
- Country of origin: United States
- Original language: English
- No. of seasons: 1
- No. of episodes: 3

Original release
- Network: Hallmark+

Related
- Rainbow Brite

Rainbow Brite is an American three-part animated series that premiered on November 6, 2014, by the on-demand site Hallmark+. It is a reboot of the series of the same name, with updated character designs, and stars Emily Osment as the voice of Rainbow Brite and Molly Ringwald as the voice of Dark Princess.

== Cast and characters ==
- Emily Osment as Rainbow Brite
- Marcus Toji as Brian
- Mark Hanson as Starlite
- Mariana Flores as Mr. Glitters, Lala Orange, Patty O'Green, Sprites, Captain Fuzz, Computer Voice
- Alexandra Krosney as Stormy, Canary Yellow
- Molly Ringwald as Dark Princess
- Cam Clarke as Murky, Red Butler
- Todd Bosley as Lurky
- Evan Cooper as Buddy Blue

Indigo and Shy Violet do not have a voice actor.

== Episodes ==
1. "Cloudy with a Chance of Gloom"
2. "The Ring's the Thing"
3. "Operation Sparkle Color Explosion"
