= Joanne Nail =

American actress

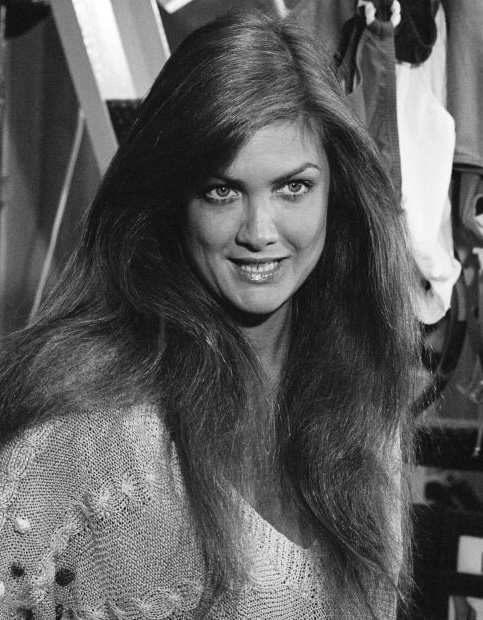
- Nail in 1977
- Born: June 3, 1947 (age 79); Spokane, Washington, U.S.
- Education: University of Washington; Eastern Washington University
- Occupation: Actress
- Years active: 1971–1988

Joanne Elizabeth Nail (born June 3, 1947) is an American former film, stage, and television actress. She is best known for her roles in the exploitation film Switchblade Sisters (1975), the science fiction horror film The Visitor (1979), and Larry Cohen's werewolf horror comedy Full Moon High (1981).

Nail also appeared on Broadway in the productions Scratch (1971) and Lysistrata (1972). On television, she guest-starred on numerous series throughout the 1970s and 1980s, including Harry O, The Rockford Files, Young Maverick, and Hawaii Five-O.

== Early life ==
Nail was born and raised in Spokane, Washington. She has a fraternal twin brother, Gregory, a physician, and another brother, David, a businessman. She began acting in her youth at the Spokane Civic Theatre and graduated from Lewis and Clark High School. She attended the University of Washington as an art major for three years before graduating with a bachelor's degree in education from Eastern Washington University in 1970.

== Career ==
Nail appeared on Broadway in the productions Scratch (1971) and Lysistrata (1972) before making her feature film debut in the exploitation film Switchblade Sisters (1975), opposite Michael Sarrazin. She subsequently starred in the Italian-American science fiction horror film The Visitor (1979), portraying the mother of a young daughter with telekinesis opposite Mel Ferrer, Shelley Winters, and John Huston. She subsequently had a lead role in Larry Cohen's horror comedy Full Moon High (1981), opposite Adam Arkin.

On television, Nail had guest-starring roles on Marcus Welby, M.D. (1974), The Rockford Files (1977), Hawaii Five-O (1978), and Cagney & Lacey (1988).

== Filmography ==
=== Film ===
Year	Title	Role(s)	Notes	Ref.
1975	Switchblade Sisters	Maggie		
1976	The Gumball Rally	Jane – Porsche Team		
1978	Mother, Juggs & Speed	Jennifer Juggston	Television film	
1979	The Visitor	Barbara Collins		
1981	Midnight Lace	Luana Smiley	Television film	
1981	The Choice	Tina	Television film	
1981	Full Moon High	Ricky		
1981	Warp Speed	Lt. Tanya Fleischer	Television film	
1981	The Perfect Woman	Julie	Television film	
1983	I'm Going to Be Famous			

=== Television ===
Year	Title	Role(s)	Notes	Ref.
1974	Marcus Welby, M.D.	June Allen	1 episode	
1975	S.W.A.T.	Pam McCabe	1 episode	
1976	Harry O	Jamie	Episode: "Book of Changes"	
1977	Code R	Cindy	1 episode	
1977	The Streets of San Francisco	Tina Harrington	1 episode	
1977	The Rockford Files	Mary Jo Flynn	Episode: "The Dog and Pony Show"	
1977	James at 15	Mrs. Carson	1 episode	
1978	Hawaii Five-O	Luana Watkins	1 episode	
1979	Young Maverick	Rose	1 episode	
1981	Enos	Dina	1 episode	
1988	Cagney & Lacey	Mrs. Prentiss	1 episode	
1988	Designing Women	Girl #1	1 episode	

== Stage credits ==
Year	Title	Role(s)	Notes	Ref.
1968	Up the Down Staircase		University of Washington Student Auditorium	
1971	Scratch	Susan	St. James Theatre	
1972	Lysistrata	Woman B	Brooks Atkinson Theatre	

== Sources ==
- Aldous, Steve; Gillies, Gary (2025). The Harry O Viewing Companion: History and Episodes of the Classic Detective Series. Jefferson, North Carolina: McFarland & Company. ISBN 978-1-476-65410-2.
- Senn, Bryan (2017). The Werewolf Filmography: 300+ Movies. Jefferson, North Carolina: McFarland & Company. ISBN 978-1-476-62691-8.
