= The Gumball Rally =

1976 American comedy film by Charles Bail

- Theatrical release poster
- Directed by: Charles Bail
- Screenplay by: Leon Capetanos
- Story by: Leon Capetanos; Charles Bail
- Produced by: Charles Bail
- Starring: Michael Sarrazin; Norman Burton; Raúl Juliá; Gary Busey
- Cinematography: Richard C. Glouner
- Edited by: Stuart H. Pappe; Gordon Scott; Maury Winetrobe
- Music by: Dominic Frontiere
- Production company: First Artists
- Distributed by: Warner Bros.
- Release date: August 20, 1976
- Running time: 105 minutes
- Country: United States
- Language: English
- Budget: $4.5 million

The Gumball Rally is a 1976 American action comedy film, directed and co-written by Charles Bail, a former stunt coordinator also known as Chuck Bail, about an illicit coast-to-coast road race. It was inspired by the Cannonball Baker Sea-to-Shining-Sea Memorial Trophy Dash run by Brock Yates, which inspired several other films, including Cannonball (1976), Cannonball Run (1981), and Speed Zone (1989), as well as an actual event, the American Gumball Rally and Gumball 3000 international race.

== Plot ==
Michael Bannon, a wealthy but bored businessman and candymaker, issues the code word "Gumball" to his fellow automobile enthusiasts, who gather in a garage in New York City to embark on a coast-to-coast race "with no catalytic converter and no 55-mile-per-hour speed limit" in the shortest amount of time. There is only one rule: "There are no rules".

Their longtime nemesis, Los Angeles Police Department Lieutenant Roscoe, who has been trying for years to arrest Bannon and his group, has flown in specially to attempt to shut down the race. He is unsuccessful, and the race begins early the next morning in spite of his momentary interference. Most of the film is devoted to the adventures of the various driving teams and Roscoe's ineffectual attempts to apprehend them.

A number of running gags ensue – the Jaguar that will not start (and never even makes it off the starting line); the silent (and somewhat-psychotic) motorcyclist Lapchik's numerous mishaps; Italian race driver Franco Bertollini's frequent detours to seduce beautiful women – as well as some stunts and driving sequences, including the first moving car into moving tractor-trailer stunt later to become a trademark of Knight Rider, the typical sequence of workers carrying a large glass window only to have it shattered by a speeding vehicle, and a race in the Los Angeles River at the same location where Greased Lightning would defeat the Scorpions' Mercury in Grease. The race ends at the Queen Mary in Long Beach, California where the finishers celebrate their arrival and the defeated Roscoe sulks off to one side – until a fleet of police cars and tow trucks, summoned by Roscoe, arrive to impound the Gumball vehicles. Roscoe had contrived a plan to see to it that all of them were guaranteed to be illegally parked once the post-race party in the parking lot ran past 11 p.m.

Bannon congratulates Roscoe on his final victory (final because Roscoe, who has been after Bannon and Smith since they were in high school, has reached mandatory retirement age). Contemplating how they will all return home without cars, he again utters the word "Gumball" to the assembled group to indicate a race back to New York. Lapchik, the last contestant to finish the race, roars through the parking lot with a stuck throttle and is launched out into the water.

== Cast & vehicles ==
- Michael Sarrazin as Michael Bannon - AC Cobra
- Nicholas Pryor as Professor Samuel Graves - AC Cobra
- Tim McIntire as Steve Smith - Ferrari Daytona
- Raúl Juliá as Franco Bertollini - Ferrari Daytona
- Norman Burton as Lieutenant Roscoe, LAPD
- John Durren as Ace "Mr. Guts" Preston - Chevrolet Camaro Z-28
- Gary Busey as Gibson, Preston's co-driver and mechanic - Chevrolet Camaro Z-28
- Joanne Nail as Jane Johnson - Porsche 911
- Susan Flannery as Alice Johnson - Porsche 911
- J. Pat O'Malley as Barney Donahue - Mercedes-Benz 300 SL
- Vaughn Taylor as Andy McAllister - Mercedes-Benz 300SL
- Lazaro Perez as Jose - Rolls-Royce Silver Shadow
- Tricia O'Neil as Angie - Rolls-Royce Silver Shadow
- Harvey Jason as Lapchik "The Mad Hungarian" - Kawasaki KH400 Motorcycle
- Steven Keats as Kandinsky - 1971 Dodge Polara Police Car
- Wally Taylor as Avila - Dodge Polara Police Car
- Eddy Donno as Mel Donno - Chevrolet Van
- Dick Karie as Joe Karie - Chevrolet Van
- Alfred Shelly as Harry Shelly - Chevrolet Van
- Whitey Hughes as Hughes - Chevrolet Corvette
- Larry Silvestri as Silvestri - Chevrolet Corvette
- Wes Dawn as Mullin - Jaguar E-Type, Series III V-12
- John Morton as "Tulip" - Jaguar E-Type
- Stephen Blood as "Rabbit" - Hot Rod
- Med Flory as Officer Williams
- Linda Vaughn as Emergency Plan Alpha
- Walter R. Smith as Police Officer
- John Lawlor as Alice Johnson's Husband

== Production ==
Most of the filming took place in Arizona. Opening scenes of the race were filmed in downtown New York City early on a Sunday morning on closed roads (including Broadway and Park Avenue).

The actors were given basic training to do perform some of the driving themselves after the initial plan of using tow rigs was found to be untenable due to the attention it garnered.

== Reception ==
The film holds a rating of 33% on Rotten Tomatoes from 15 reviews.

Roger Ebert gave the film 2.5 stars and called it "good-spirited and fun" in comparison to the earlier and similar film Cannonball.
