= Full Moon High =

1981 film by Larry Cohen

- Theatrical release poster
- Directed by: Larry Cohen
- Written by: Larry Cohen
- Produced by: Larry Cohen
- Starring: Adam Arkin; Ed McMahon; Roz Kelly
- Cinematography: Daniel Pearl
- Edited by: Armond Lebowitz
- Music by: Gary William Friedman
- Production company: Larco Productions
- Distributed by: Filmways Pictures
- Release date: October 9, 1981
- Running time: 93 minutes
- Country: United States
- Language: English

Full Moon High is a 1981 American comedy horror film written and directed by Larry Cohen. The film stars Adam Arkin, Ed McMahon and Roz Kelly.

The plot revolves around an adolescent boy becoming a werewolf while his aging process ceases.

== Plot ==
A teenager goes on a trip to Transylvania with his father and gets bitten by a werewolf. Made ageless, he attempts to put his life back together a couple of decades later by enrolling in high school. He initially tries to keep his secret from the school and the three women who show interest in him — a sexually active high school student, his own former girlfriend (now a married mother of one), and one of his teachers. He ignores sexual advances because it is his "time of the month."

He later encourages the female high school student to film his transformation. She, and the students who later watch the film, mistake the footage at first for a stag film, but after people watch the whole film, the werewolf is arrested for the crimes he committed while in wolf form. He, as the wolf, escapes prison in time to participate in his high school's homecoming football game. There he is gunned down by a psychiatrist. He survives because inflation has rendered a single silver bullet insufficient to kill a werewolf.

== Cast ==
- Adam Arkin as Tony Walker
- Ed McMahon as Col. William P. Walker
- Roz Kelly as Jane
- Joanne Nail as Ricky
- Bill Kirchenbauer as Detective Jack Flynn
- Kenneth Mars as Coach / Principal Cleveland
- Elizabeth Hartman as Miss Montgomery
- Alan Arkin as Dr. Brand
- Louis Nye as Reverend
- Demond Wilson as Cabbie / Busdriver
- Cheryl Lockett Alexander as Pregnant Teenager
- Jim J. Bullock as Eddie
- Tom Aldredge as The Jailer
- Tom Clancy as Priest
- Laurene Landon as Blondie
- John Blyth Barrymore as Student
- Bob Saget as Sportscaster
- Pat Morita as Silversmith
- Armando G. Fernandez as School Dance Dancer

== Production ==
The film was filmed partially at John Burroughs Senior High School in the city of Burbank, California, in the summer of 1979. A portion of this movie was also filmed on location in Lyndhurst, New Jersey, on the football field in Bergen County Park at the foot of Valley Brook Avenue and River Road. The stands were filled with everyone from the town, and the varsity football team of that year were featured.

It is Cohen's "only outright comedy"

== Reception ==
The film has a seemingly disorganised structure that may be explained by its chaotic production conditions.

== Legacy ==
Dread Central called the film a cult classic. The film has been compared to the later Teen Wolf.

=== Screening ===
The film was screened at the Paris French Cinémathèque in January 2023 as part of the Cohen retrospective.
