= Robbie Lee (actress) =

American actress (born 1954)

- Born: Robin Lee Hoopes; September 1, 1954 (age 72); Los Angeles, California, U.S.
- Occupations: Actress; businesswoman
- Years active: 1974–1994
- Known for: Switchblade Sisters; Big Bad Mama; Rainbow Brite; The Get Along Gang; The Six Million Dollar Man

Robbie Lee (born Robin Lee Hoopes) is an American actress. She is known for the cult films Switchblade Sisters and Big Bad Mama. Lee also had a successful career as a voice actress, known for the characters Twink in Rainbow Brite and Zipper Cat in The Get Along Gang.

== Early life ==
Lee was born in the San Fernando Valley in Southern California in 1954. Her mother was the actress Georgia Lee who starred in the 1950s in a series of movies with reverend Billy Graham. Her father was the character actor Ralph Lee who later became a preacher and founder of the Valley Presbyterian Church.

== Career ==
Robbie made her first on-screen appearance in one of her mother's films with reverend Billy Graham. She graduated from high school in 1972. Lee took up modeling and appeared in many advertisements in print and in television.

In 1974 she appeared in the Roger Corman film, Big Bad Mama with Angie Dickinson,, William Shatner and Tom Skerritt. In 1975 she appeared in the film Linda Lovelace for President. She is most famous for her role as Lace in the 1975 cult film, Switchblade Sisters. Lee appeared in television in guest roles on The Six Million Dollar Man and Police Woman.

Robbie had a second career as a voice actress on children's TV shows. She was the voice of Twink in Rainbow Brite. Other voicework include Q*bert, The Get Along Gang as Zipper Cat and Pound Puppies and the Legend of Big Paw.

== Personal life ==
Lee's godparents were singing cowboy Roy Rogers and his wife Dale Evans. She has her own production company, Dream Ranch Productions.

== Filmography ==
=== Film ===
Year	Title	Role	Notes	Ref
1974	Big Bad Mama	Polly		
1975	Linda Lovelace for President	Hillbilly Girl with Veep		
1975	Switchblade Sisters	Lace		
1983	My Therapist	Doreen		
1985	Rainbow Brite and the Star Stealer	Twink (voice)		
1988	Pound Puppies and the Legend of Big Paw	Puppy (voice)		
1988	Mad Scientist	Brian (voice)	Video	

=== Television ===
Year	Title	Role	Notes	Ref
1975	The Six Million Dollar Man	Audrey Moss	Episode: "The E.S.P. Spy"	
1975	Police Woman	Jenny	Episode: "Glitter with a Bullet"	
1976	The Six Million Dollar Man	Audrey Moss	Episode: "Hocus-Pocus"	
1978	Sister Terri	Samantha	tv movie	
1983	Saturday Supercade	Q*Tee, Q*Val (voice)	Episode: "The Who-Took-Toadwalker Story / Bananaa Bikers / Disc Derby Fiasco / Rocky Mountain Monkey Business"	
1984	ABC Weekend Specials	Andy Winsborrow (voice)	Episode: "The Bunjee Venture"	
1984	The Get Along Gang	Zipper Cat (voice)	13 episodes	
1985	ABC Weekend Specials	Andy winsborrow (voice)	Episode: "The Return of the Bunjee"	
1985	Sweet Sea	Mudpuppy, Purrsha, Goldie (voice)	TV short	
1985	It's Your Birthday with Rainbow Brite and Friends	Twink (voice)	Video	
1986	Rainbow Brite: San Diego Zoo Adventure	Twink (voice, uncredited)	Video	
1984–1986	Rainbow Brite	Twink (voice)	13 episodes	
1989	The Further Adventures of SuperTed	Billy (voice)	Episode: "Dot's Entertainment"	
1989	The Further Adventures of SuperTed	Plush (voice)	Episode: "Ben-Fur"	
1984–1989	The Smurfs	Additional Voices	2 episodes	
1994	Bobby's World	Ozzie (voice)	Episode: "One Clump or Two"	
