= Andre Stojka =

American voice actor

- Born: California, U.S.
- Occupation: Voice actor
- Years active: 1967–present
- Agent: DPN
- Website: www.andrevoices.com

Andre Francis Stojka is an American voice actor. He is best known for his role as the voice of Owl in the Winnie-the-Pooh franchises starting with Pooh's Grand Adventure: The Search for Christopher Robin inheriting the role from Hal Smith after his death in 1994.

== Career ==
Andre Stojka originally began his career as an associate producer in one episode of the Western television series The Virginian, he would later begin pursuing voice acting in late 1979, beginning with the animated television series Scooby-Doo and Scrappy-Doo.

Stojka also performed the voice of the horse Starlite in all of the animated Rainbow Brite productions. Other roles include the druid from The Grim Adventures of Billy & Mandy and the King in the Cinderella sequels. He also voiced the Grim Creeper in Scooby-Doo and the Ghoul School.

Starting in September 2009, Stojka took over the role of John Avery Whittaker on the Christian radio series Adventures in Odyssey. This role was previously voiced by Hal Smith (both men voiced Owl from Winnie the Pooh) and Paul Herlinger.

== Filmography ==
=== Film ===
- Rainbow Brite and the Star Stealer - Starlite
- Pooh's Grand Adventure: The Search for Christopher Robin - Owl
- Winnie the Pooh: Seasons of Giving - Owl
- The Tigger Movie - Owl
- The Emperor's New Groove - Topo
- The Book of Pooh: Stories from the Heart - Owl
- Cinderella II: Dreams Come True - The King
- Piglet's Big Movie - Owl
- Cinderella III: A Twist in Time - The King

=== Animation ===
- Scooby-Doo and Scrappy-Doo - Additional voices
- The Scooby and Scrappy-Doo Puppy Hour - Additional voices
- Ri¢hie Ri¢h - Additional voices
- Shirt Tales - Additional voices
- ABC Weekend Specials - Victim #1, Elder Og, Og Father
- The New Scooby and Scrappy-Doo Show - Additional voices
- Pac-Man - Additional voices
- Pink Panther and Sons - Additional voices
- The Super Powers Team: Galactic Guardians - Scarecrow, Alfred Pennyworth
- Challenge of the GoBots - Professor Robert Frost
- The Jetsons - Additional voices
- The Greatest Adventure: Stories from the Bible - Additional voices
- Rainbow Brite - Starlite, Sorrel
- Noah's Ark - Additional voices
- David and Goliath - Additional voices
- Wildfire - Additional voices
- The New Adventures of Jonny Quest - Mr. Trudge
- Scooby-Doo and the Ghoul School - The Grim Creeper, Mummy Daddy
- Yogi's Treasure Hunt - Additional voices
- Superman - Additional voices
- Adventures of the Gummi Bears - Doctor Dexter, Knight, Willard
- Fantastic Max - Additional voices
- Bobby's World - Additional voices
- The Pirates of Dark Water - Additional voices
- Swat Kats: The Radical Squadron - Dr. Ohm
- A Winnie the Pooh Thanksgiving - Owl
- Winnie the Pooh: A Valentine for You - Owl
- The Book of Pooh - Owl
- Men in Black - Additional voices
- Darkwing Duck - Company Boss
- House of Mouse - Archimedes
- The Pirates of Dark Water - Additional voices
- Cow and Chicken - Announcer #1, Doctor
- The Grim Adventures of Billy & Mandy - Basil, Bear #2, Owl
- The Life & Times of Tim - Pudding Man
- Winnie the Pooh: ABC's - Owl
- Winnie the Pooh: 123's - Owl
- Winnie the Pooh: Wonderful Word Adventure - Owl
- Winnie the Pooh: Shape and Sizes - Owl

=== Anime ===
- Pom Poko - Osho (English dub)

=== Direct-to-video ===
- The Wacky Adventures of Ronald McDonald - Royal Chef

=== Video games ===
- Winnie the Pooh Toddler - Owl
- Winnie the Pooh Kindergarten - Owl
- Tigger's Honey Hunt - Owl
- Pooh's Party Game: In Search of the Treasure - Owl
- The Mark of Kri - Mauruku
- Piglet's Big Game - Owl
- Winnie the Pooh's Rumbly Tumbly Adventure - Owl
- Onimusha: Dawn of Dreams - Additional voices
- Kingdom Hearts II - Owl
- Kingdom Hearts II Final Mix - Owl

=== Radio ===
- Adventures in Odyssey - Mr. Whittaker

=== Live-action ===
- Wolfen - ESS Voice (voice)
- McDonaldland - Professor
- Simplicity and Complication - Tony
- Some Gave All - Drunk Patron
- $weethearts - George
- Coyotes - Luis Castillo
- The Grindhouse Radio - Himself

== Crew work ==
- The Virginian - Associate producer (1 episode)

Preceded by Hal Smith	Voice of Owl; 1997–2007	Succeeded by Craig Ferguson
