= The Visitor (1979 film) =

1979 film by Giulio Paradisi

- Theatrical release poster
- Directed by: Giulio Paradisi (Note: Credited as 'Michael J. Paradise'.)
- Screenplay by: Luciano Comici; Robert Mundi
- Story by: Giulio Paradisi; Ovidio G. Assonitis
- Produced by: Ovidio G. Assonitis
- Starring: Mel Ferrer; Glenn Ford; Lance Henriksen; John Huston; Joanne Nail; Sam Peckinpah; Shelley Winters; Paige Conner
- Cinematography: Ennio Guarnieri
- Edited by: Roberto Curi
- Music by: Franco Micalizzi
- Production companies: Brouwersgracht Investments; Film Ventures International; Swan American Film
- Distributed by: The International Picture Show Company (U.S.); United Artists (international)
- Release dates: 22 March 1979 (Italy); 28 September 1979 (Atlanta)
- Running time: 99 minutes
- Countries: Italy; United States
- Language: English
- Budget: $2.9–3.3 million

The Visitor (released in Italy as Stridulum) is a 1979 science fiction horror film directed by Giulio Paradisi and starring Mel Ferrer, Glenn Ford, Lance Henriksen, Joanne Nail, John Huston, Sam Peckinpah, and Shelley Winters. Its plot focuses on a battle between cosmic forces mirroring Abrahamic God and Satan figures, over the soul of a young girl with telekinetic abilities.

An international co-production between Italian and American companies, it was filmed on location in Atlanta, Georgia and at Cinecittà and De Paolis Studios in Rome. The film was released in Italy on March 22, 1979. It has garnered a cult following over the years.

== Plot ==
In an alien landscape, Jerzy Colsowicz experiences a vision of a powerful and destructive storm brought about by a young human girl. His colleague, an enigmatic Christ-like figure, tells his bald pupils about the centuries-long cosmic conflict between Zatteen, an evil inter-spatial force of immense magnitude with powerful psychic abilities, and his benevolent arch-rival Yahweh. Zatteen escaped to the planet Earth centuries ago, and though he was eventually tracked down and killed by Yahweh, his spirit lives on in the minds of humankind, waiting for an opportunity to reemerge and wreak havoc. The figure tells his disciples that Zatteen had produced dozens of children with human women before his death, and these descendants continue to populate the Earth.

During a professional basketball game at The Omni in Atlanta, home team owner Raymond Armstead sits courtside and promises an interviewer that the team will win at all costs. Since Raymond is a new owner and the source of his wealth is unknown, the interviewer presses him on the source of his wealth. He eventually answers that the money comes "from God". Raymond is in league with a secret group of Satanists who wish to bring about the resurgence of Zatteen. His associate Dr. Walker reminds him that his girlfriend Barbara Collins can be used as a conduit to distill Zatteen's powers into a corporeal, human form. Her 8-year old daughter Katy has already displayed psychokinetic abilities, and it's the Satanists' goal to have Raymond father a male child with Barbara, who in turn will mate with his half-sister and produce the physical embodiment of Zatteen.

Katy is only partially aware of her powers, and she experiments with them throughout the film, most notably helping Raymond's basketball team to victory. Colsowicz, who possesses powers similar to Katy, is sent to Earth by the Christ-like figure with several of his disciples, where at first they survey her from a distance. He's also acquainted with Barbara's new maid, Jane Phillips, who instantly sees the potential evil inherent in Katy, as she had once had a child with the same abilities. Katy begins using her powers to facilitate the Satanists' goals, causing a series of fatal accidents to happen to their enemies. Barbara is inadvertently paralyzed by a gunshot wound, and becomes relegated to a wheelchair. A police detective, Jake Durham, investigating the deaths is killed in a car accident facilitated by the Satanists.

Raymond fails to seduce Barbara, and the Satanists decide to proceed with other, more violent methods. Barbara does get pregnant after the intervention, but is still afraid of having another child and has her ex, Katy's biological father, Dr. Sam Collins, abort the baby. When she returns home, she is attacked for her actions by Raymond and Katy, who attempt to execute her by tying a wire around her neck and sending her down the stairs in her chair lift. Before they can succeed, Colsowicz intervenes and summons an army of doves that thwart Katy and kill Raymond. The next day, the other Satanists are found dead at their round table, presumably by Colsowicz's intervention.

Colsowicz returns to the Christ-like figure and his apostles. He reveals that he has brought Katy with him. She is now bald and cleansed of her malice, and the film ends with her smiling and embracing Colsowicz, who insists that children are not to be harmed.

== Cast ==
- Mel Ferrer as Dr. Walker
- Glenn Ford as Det. Jake Durham
- Lance Henriksen as Raymond Armstead
- John Huston as Jerzy Colsowicz
- Joanne Nail as Barbara Collins
- Sam Peckinpah as Dr. Sam Collins
- Shelley Winters as Jane Phillips
- Paige Conner as Katy Collins
- Franco Nero as Christ Figure (uncredited)
- J.A. Townsend as Susan
- Joe Dorsey as Sheriff Townsend
- Wallace Wilkinson as Police Captain
- Walter Gordon Sr. as Thomsa
- Johnny Popwell as Mechanic

Atlanta radio personality Neal Boortz has a small role as a businessman, while fellow radio host Steve Somers has a minor walk-on role. Kareem Abdul-Jabbar makes an uncredited cameo appearance as himself.

== Production ==
The film was shot on-location in Atlanta, where producer Ovidio G. Assonitis had previously filmed Tentacles (1977), also starring John Huston and Shelley Winters. Sequences were shot in several local landmarks, including the Omni. The rest of the film was shot at Cinecittà and De Paolis Studios in Rome.

Aaron Norris worked a stuntman. Bruno Bozzetto was the animator for the film's visual effects.

Due to his well-publicized alcoholism, Sam Peckinpah had difficulty memorizing his dialogue, and all of his lines were dubbed by another actor.

== Release ==
The Visitor premiered in Rome on March 22, 1979. The film was released in Italy under the title Stridulum and in Spain as El visitante del más allá. It was originally set to be distributed in the United States by American International Pictures, but they dropped out. Instead, the film was distributed by the International Picture Show Company, who released it in Atlanta on 28 September 1979. United Artists distributed the film elsewhere internationally.

The soundtrack by Franco Micalizzi was released in 1978 in Italy and 1979 worldwide.

=== Home media ===
The Visitor was released on DVD by independent distributor Code Red in November 2010. It was the first time the film had been presented in its uncut form in the United States.

In 2013, independent distributor Drafthouse Films acquired the film. Drafthouse Films announced they would re-release the film in remastered form on October 31, 2013 with a VOD/digital and home entertainment release in January 2014.

Arrow Films released the uncut version on Blu-ray and DVD in the United Kingdom on 6 October 2014. They later issued a 4K UHD Blu-ray edition in North America on 17 February 2026.

== Reception ==
=== Critical response ===
On review aggregator Rotten Tomatoes, The Visitor holds an approval rating of 79%, based on 19 reviews, and an average rating of 6.4/10. On Metacritic, the film has a weighted average score of 65 out of 100, based on 5 critics, indicating "generally positive reviews".

Film.com's David Ehrlich referred to the film as "a remake of The Bad Seed as filtered through the acid-tinged mind of Alejandro Jodorowsky." Many of the set pieces in the film bear striking resemblances to contemporary releases. When the Visitor returns to his cosmic home, there is an extended light sequence that is modeled on the end of Close Encounters of the Third Kind. Katy Collins (Paige Conner)'s ominous powers are rendered in the style of The Omen, and the conflict over her nature, with good finally triumphing over evil due to the help of Jerzy Colsowicz (John Huston), an elderly man, led critic Sean Axmaker to call the film an "Exorcist knock-off". The review cited other obvious influences on the film like Carrie, The Birds, and The Lady from Shanghai.

Mondo Digital referred to it as "the Mount Everest of insane '70s Italian movies."

== Sources ==
- Amador, Maria Luisa; Blanco, Jorge Ayala (2006). Cartelera cinematografica, 1980-1989 (in Spanish). Mexico City, Mexico: UNAM. ISBN 978-970-32-3605-3.
- Hayes, Kevin J. (2008). Sam Peckinpah: Interviews. Jackson, Mississippi: University Press of Mississippi. ISBN 978-1-934110-64-5.
- Lancia, Enrico; Melelli, Fabio (2005). Le straniere del nostro Cinema (in Italian). Rome, Italy: Gremese Editore. ISBN 978-88-8440-350-6.
