= Lady Lovely Locks =

American animated television series

- Logo of the series
- Also known as: Lady Lovely Locks and the Pixietails
- Created by: Andy Heyward
- Written by: Jack Olesker
- Directed by: Bernard Deyriès
- Starring: Tony St. Vincent
- Country of origin: United States
- Original language: English
- No. of seasons: 1
- No. of episodes: 10

Production
- Executive producer: Andy Heyward
- Producers: Andy Heyward; Tetsuo Katayama
- Running time: 30 minutes
- Production companies: DIC Animation City; Those Characters from Cleveland; Tatsunoko Production

Original release
- Network: Syndication
- Release: April 4 – June 6, 1987

Lady Lovely Locks and the Pixietails is a character property created by American Greetings subsidiary Those Characters from Cleveland (creators of Strawberry Shortcake, Care Bears and Popples among others) in the mid-1980s which soon expanded into a toyline by Mattel. An animated television series by DIC Animation City, it was released in 1987, running for a single series of ten half-hour episodes (each consisting of two segments) and was syndicated by LBS Communications on the Kideo TV strand.

== Animated series ==
Lady LovelyLocks is the princess of the Kingdom of LovelyLocks. She and her friends are aided by the Pixietails in keeping the kingdom safe from its enemies. Among the hero characters of the show are Lady LovelyLocks, Maiden FairHair, Maiden CurlyCrown, the Pixietails, Prince StrongHeart, ShiningGlory, SilkyPup (a puppy), and SilkyMane (a horse). The main villains are Duchess RavenWaves, HairBall, and their Comb Gnomes, the latter of whom tend to speak in rhyme. The show was cancelled after one season.

The series was produced by the French and Japanese animators of Rainbow Brite and Jem, among other 1980s cartoons. The music for the series was composed by Shuki Levy and Haim Saban and supervised by Marty Wereski. The original "Lady LovelyLocks" theme song was composed by Shuki Levy and produced by the music department of Saban Productions and performed by Donna De Lory. The original full theme song can be heard on Shuki Levy's official website.

Hi-Tops Video released five Lady LovelyLocks videos in the 1980s. These videos have since reappeared on the market. They resurfaced as part of the DVD set "Girls Rule Vol. 1" which included the following cartoon series: Jem, Rainbow Brite, and Lady LovelyLocks. Several of the episodes are also available on a DVD in the "Biggest DVD Ever" series for Lady LovelyLocks. Two episodes have never been collected except on the Australian VHS edition, and German DVD releases. As of 2024, the series is currently owned by WildBrain.

=== List of episodes ===
| No. | Title | Written by | Original release date |
|---|---|---|---|
| 1 | "To Save My Kingdom" "Cruel Pretender" | Jack Olesker | April 4, 1987 |
| 2 | "Vanished" "The Wishing Bone" | Jack Olesker | April 11, 1987 |
| 3 | "The Discovery" "The Lake of Reflections" | Jack Olesker Jody Miles Conner | April 18, 1987 |
| 4 | "The Menace of Mirror Lake" "Blue Moon" | Phil Harnage | April 25, 1987 |
| 5 | "The Bundle" "In the Kingdom of Ice" | Howard R. Cohen Phil Harnage | May 2, 1987 |
| 6 | "The Power and the Glory" "Prince's Broken Heart" | Jeff Rose Howard R. Cohen | May 9, 1987 |
| 7 | "The Noble Deed" "The Doubt" | Jack Olesker Susan J. Leslie | May 16, 1987 |
| 8 | "The Dragon Tree" "The Capture" | Jack Olesker | May 23, 1987 |
| 9 | "The Keeper" "The Rally" | Jack Olesker | May 30, 1987 |
| 10 | "Fire in the Sky" "To Take a Castle" | Jack Olesker | June 6, 1987 |

==== Broadcast ====
===== Broadcast USA history =====
- Syndication (April 4, 1987 – June 6, 1987) (Kideo TV)

===== Broadcast Polish history =====
- Jetix Play (2007–2008)

==== Broadcast UK history ====
- Sky Channel (November 27, 1987 – August 7, 1989)

=== VHS UK history ===
- Channel 5 Video (1987–1990) (an Spectrum (1990))

== Characters ==
=== Protagonists ===
- Lady LovelyLocks is the series' protagonist and Lady is her given name. She wears a pink dress and has blonde hair with streaks symbolizing her royalty in three colors: soft pink (dawn), gold (sun) and lavender (twilight). She is the princess of the Kingdom of LovelyLocks as well as its main source of power and life. She is a very loyal, brave, kind, selfless, polite, resourceful, optimistic, dependable and friendly individual who always treasures her people and her home. She was paired with three bunny-like Pixietails for the first toyline.
- Maiden FairHair is a maiden and best friend of Lady LovelyLocks who wears a blue dress and whose light brown hair is worn in waves. A natural beauty, party-planner, daydreamer and painter, she is very serene, cool-headed, and intelligent, but would sometimes lose track of something important and/or, to the extent, her sense of direction. She was paired with three squirrel/chipmunk-like Pixietails for the first toyline.
- Maiden CurlyCrown is another maiden and friend of Lady LovelyLocks who wears a yellow dress and curly red hair. A funny and imaginative girl with a big heart, she loves making up stories, styling her hair, and collecting bugs, but is somewhat impulsive and, despite being quite smart, would sometimes get herself into trouble. She was paired with three bird-like Pixietails for the first toyline.
- SilkyMane is Lady's kind-hearted, trusty royal-purple horse who always understands her thoughts and feelings. The character was paired with five bunny-like Pixietails for the toyline.
- SilkyPup is Lady's happy-go-lucky, yet trouble-prone pink pet puppy who has a secret crush on the Prince. The character was paired with three bird-like Pixietails for the toyline.
- ShiningGlory is a blind, yet very wise and powerful sorcerer and wizard, and the beloved mentor to Lady and her friends. He often aids Lady with his magic. It appears that he adopted the Prince after he was cursed. When inside a dimensionally transcendental crystal in his castle, ShiningGlory has his eyesight, but when outside, he is blind. The character was never produced for the toyline.
- Prince StrongHeart was originally a human, but was turned into a dog known as "Prince" as a result of a dreadful curse. He often visits the castle gardens since being adopted by ShiningGlory. At times, the opportunity for him to turn human again arises, but he always foregoes that chance, opting to help his companions instead, such as coming to Lady's rescue when she is in danger. He is not often seen in his human form, though in ShiningGlory's crystal, StrongHeart appears human. For the toy line, he was produced as a brown-haired human, whereas he appears blond in the show. He was paired with two to three mouse-like Pixietails for the toy line, depending on the variant.

=== Antagonists ===
- Duchess RavenWaves is the series' main antagonist. She wears a purple dress and, like Maiden FairHair, her black hair is styled in waves. She is the mean, jealous, cruel, stubborn, selfish, domineering, cold, and conniving ruler of Tangleland, as well as the main archenemy of Lady LovelyLocks. Duchess always plots dastardly schemes to take over the Kingdom of LovelyLocks for herself, and believes that cutting off a piece of her rival's hair would help her reach that goal. Despite all of her negative traits she is not evil, and on a few occasions actually helps Lady when it is to their mutual advantage.
- HairBall is a former apprentice of ShiningGlory who is now in the employ of RavenWaves. Deemed untrustworthy by good people, he specializes in magic and is quite practical when it comes to making and causing trouble. He also acts miserable when he feels defeated, but this makes him quite sympathetic to his peers. The animated show depicts HairBall as a non-human troll-like creature, whereas most print media depicts him as a human dwarf. The character was never produced for the toyline.
- Comb Gnomes are creatures with big ears and wild-looking hair and fur who are henchmen of Duchess RavenWaves and accomplices to HairBall. They are mischievous and mean-spirited, yet lazy and irresponsible when executing their plans, and become upset when their part of a planned scheme fails. They are also archenemies to the Pixietails, as they all have magical powers, of which theirs is a lightning attack. Their names are Snags, Dulla and Tanglet. Unlike the many different Pixietails, these three are the only Comb Gnomes ever to be seen in the animated show; print media depicts many more of the species living in Tangleland. Only two different Comb Gnomes were supposed to have been produced for the toy line (hot pink and dark purple tails), though due to quality control issues, a few color variants exist.

=== The Pixietails ===
The Pixietails are colorful, fairy-like animals, who help Lady LovelyLocks whenever she is in need of a solution to a problem or whenever someone is in trouble. Lady's (and SilkyMane's) Pixietails are bunny-like, FairHair's Pixietails are squirrel/chipmunk-like, and CurlyCrown's (and SilkyPup's) Pixietails are bird-like. In the toyline, Prince StrongHeart's (and the baby dragons') Pixietails are mouse-like. In the animated show, Lady's bunny-like Pixietails are able to fly, whereas in print media only bird-like (and later butterfly-like) Pixietails are depicted flying.

The toyline's expansion into the Enchanted Island series later introduced fish-like, turtle-like, snail-like, and seahorse-like Sea Magic Pixietails, each with tightly-curled strands of power-curls added to their regular tails. Lady was paired with three fish-like, FairHair with two turtle-like, and CurlyCrown with two snail-like Pixietails. A few of the bunny-like and bird-like Pixietails were later given power-curls as well, sold with ballerina variants of Lady LovelyLocks and Maiden FairHair, and in separately available fashion-packs that also featured more of the Enchanted Island's Sea Magic Pixietails.

The toyline's final expansion added six butterfly-like Pixietails with sparkly strands to its lineup of flower-scented CurlyKittens, and three to a "Sparkle Pretty LadyLovelyLocks" doll.

Named Pixietails include:

- Pixieshine is a blue bunny-like Pixietail under the ownership of Lady LovelyLocks.
- Pixiebeauty is a purple bunny-like Pixietail under the ownership of Lady LovelyLocks.
- Pixiesparkle is a pink bunny-like Pixietail under the ownership of Lady LovelyLocks.

=== Dragons ===
Dragons exist in the Kingdom of LovelyLocks. They can breathe fire and have wings to fly with. Instead of hatching from eggs, newborn dragons are born from the Dragon Tree. A plant called Dragon's Hair has some connection. For the toyline, the baby dragons' Pixietails are mouse-like.

- LongCurl is a large, yellow mother dragon of the dragon triplets (not produced for the toyline).
- SweetCurl is a pink baby dragon (paired with a yellow-and-orange-pink mouse-like Pixietail for the toyline).
- MerryCurl is a purple baby dragon (paired with a blue-and-yellow-pink mouse-like Pixietail for the toyline).
- BouncyCurl is a green baby dragon (paired with a pink-and-blue-green mouse-like Pixietail for the toyline).

=== Hide'N'Seeks ===
Only appearing in the toyline and some print media, these three shy, humanoid fairies are described to hide behind their long hair, among the colorful flowers and shrubs in the valley between the Kingdom of LovelyLocks and Enchanted Island. They are "so bashful that they only peek out when their friends are near". The toyline first introduced them with bird-like Pixietails, but quickly changed the pairing to Enchanted Island's (turtle-like, snail-like, and fish-like) Sea Magic Pixietails.

- PerkyPeek is a pink-haired fairy with purple streaks, and a yellow turtle-like Sea Magic Pixietail.
- SunnyPeek is a blue-haired fairy with green streaks, and a pink snail-like Sea Magic Pixietail.
- PearlyPeek is a purple-haired fairy with pink streaks, and a blue fish-like Sea Magic Pixietail.

=== LilyTops ===
Only appearing in the toyline's Enchanted Island expansion, these three seal-like "water babies" are described to be "hiding under giant lilypad hats, and love to play in the water". Produced to float, they can "ferry the Sea Magic Pixietails around the waters of Enchanted Island". The toyline paired them with Enchanted Island's (turtle-like, snail-like, and fish-like) Sea Magic Pixietails.

- LilySplash is a blue seal-like creature with a yellow lilypad hat, and an orange-and-pink fish-like Sea Magic Pixietail.
- LilySprinkle is a yellow seal-like creature with a purple lilypad hat, and a blue-and-pink turtle-like Sea Magic Pixietail.
- LilyBubble is a purple seal-like creature with a pink lilypad hat, and a yellow-and-orange seahorse-like Sea Magic Pixietail.

=== Mermaids ===
- Maiden GoldenWaves: Only appearing in the toyline's Enchanted Island expansion and some print media, this maiden is a light-skinned, blonde-and-blue-haired mermaid in a blue tail-like dress, and two seahorse-like (purple-pink and orange-yellow) Sea Magic Pixietails.
- Maiden MistyCurls: Only appearing in the toy line's Enchanted Island expansion, this maiden is a dark-skinned, black-and-purple-haired mermaid in a purple tail-like dress, and two seahorse-like (pink-orange and blue-purple) Sea Magic Pixietails.

=== CurlyKittens ===
Only appearing in the toyline's final expansion, six colorful kittens appear in the Kingdom of LovelyLocks to "make the yearly Flower Ball even more fragrant with their different flower scents". Each is paired with one sparkly-tailed, butterfly-like Pixietail.

- PinkyPaws is a pink rose-scented kitten with blue-and-purple butterfly-like Pixietail.
- PurplePurr is a purple, lilac-scented kitten with blue-and-pink butterfly-like Pixietail.
- PeachyPuff is an orange, lilly-scented kitten with green-and-yellow butterfly-like Pixietail.
- SunnySoft is a yellow, buttercup-scented kitten with pink-and-purple butterfly-like Pixietail.
- SapphireShy is a blue, carnation-scented kitten with yellow-and-pink butterfly-like Pixietail.
- CreamyCoat is a white, gardenia-scented kitten with purple-and-pink butterfly-like Pixietail.

== Toyline ==
The Lady Lovely Locks toyline was created by Those Characters from Cleveland and produced by Mattel from 1986 to 1989. The toyline consists of character dolls that are approximately 8.5 inches tall, with certain dolls having long, colorful locks. Most dolls came with two to three Pixietails (small, colorful, iridescent-plastic-bodied clip-ons in the shapes of critter-like animals with long silky tails). The Pixietails could be worn in the hair of either the doll or the child.

Additional items in the toyline included other pets, ten fashion-packs, six playsets, and multiple accessory packs such as crowns (tiaras) and sunglasses packaged with more Pixietails.

Playsets produced:

- Castle LovelyLocks - including 7 to 8 Pixietails (2 variants)
- Pixietail Tree House (hidden vanity) - including 5 to 6 Pixietails (2 variants)
- Sea Magic Salon (vanity) - including 4 Pixietails
- Beauty Magic Throne (convertible vanity) - including 4 Pixietails
- Fairy Tale Bedroom - included no Pixietails
- Fairy Tale Boat (swan) - included no Pixietails

Mattel's toyline packaging, as well as most other Lady LovelyLocks merchandise prominently feature illustrator Maria Gamiere's original artwork. The artist is also responsible for the property's logo design.

== Books ==
A number of tie-in books were released alongside the toyline and animated series. Among these books are "An Enchanting Fairy-Tale Adventure", "For the Love of LovelyLocks", "Lady LovelyLocks Original Story" (1987), "SilkyPup Saves the Day", "SilkyPup's Butterfly Adventure" (1987) and "The Golden Ball".

== In popular culture ==
In the eighth season episode of the series That '70s Show, "Killer Queen", the character Randy says: "Donna, Hyde's already given me a nickname. It's Mrs. Lady Lovely Locks". This is an anachronism, as the Lady Lovely Locks toyline and animated TV series were released in the mid-1980s.

A customised version of the tape was chosen by film critic Gene Siskel as his worst gift for the 1987 holiday season during the Holiday Gift Guide episode of Siskel & Ebert.

== German audio tapes ==
In Germany, ten audio tapes were produced by Europa, which extended on and continued the storylines that were never resolved by the short-lived animated TV series. Not only did the tapes dive into Lady's childhood, but they also resolved Prince StrongHeart's curse by turning him human, featured the couple's wedding and the birth of their daughter, as well as the infant's kidnapping by Duchess RavenWaves, and her glorious rescue. While each character had her or his own voice actor, the series was narrated by Hans Paetsch. The voice actors differed from those used in the animated series.

== Voice cast ==
- Tony St. Vincent - Lady LovelyLocks, Pixiesparkle
- Jeannie Elias - Maiden FairHair, Pixiebeauty, Snags, Dulla
- Brian George - ShiningGlory, Pixieshine, HairBall
- Danny Mann - Prince StrongHeart, Tanglet, Comb Gnomes
- Louise Vallance - Duchess RavenWaves, Maiden CurlyCrown

== Home media ==
In Germany, the first three episodes (six, counting the way Germans numbered them) were released on three VHS tapes. The tapes contain these episodes dubbed in German with the opening theme and closing credits as well as a TV commercial for the Lady Lovely Locks dolls.

In 2015, the entire series was released on DVD in Germany containing both German and English audio tracks (Dolby Digital 2.0 Mono) under the name "Lady Lockenlicht" which translates into "Lady Locks Light". It uses the broadcast TV material as seen on German television, which is 1:1 identical to the English video material except that it is converted to PAL and therefore slightly faster than the original NTSC format.
