= Switchblade Sisters =

1975 film

- U.S. theatrical release poster by John Solie
- Directed by: Jack Hill
- Screenplay by: F.X. Maier
- Story by: Jack Hill; John Prizer; F.X. Maier
- Produced by: John Prizer
- Starring: Robbie Lee; Joanne Nail; Monica Gayle; Asher Brauner; Chase Newhart; Marlene Clark
- Cinematography: Stephen M. Katz
- Edited by: Morton Tubor
- Music by: Medusa
- Production company: Centaur Pictures
- Distributed by: Centaur Releasing
- Release date: May 1, 1975
- Running time: 91 minutes
- Language: English
- Budget: $320,000

Switchblade Sisters is a 1975 American exploitation action film detailing the lives of high school-aged female gang members. It was directed by Jack Hill and stars Joanne Nail, Robbie Lee and Monica Gayle. The film is also known as The Jezebels, Maggie's Stiletto Sisters and The Warriors II: Las Navajeras.

The movie was not a success at the box office, but garnered a cult following later on. Most of its current popularity can be attributed to film director Quentin Tarantino, who named the picture a personal favorite and re-released it in 1996 under his Rolling Thunder Pictures label. The DVD release features an audio commentary track with Hill and Tarantino. The film's tagline is "So Easy to Kill, So Hard to Love."

== Plot ==
Maggie transfers from across town to a new high school that is essentially run by the Silver Daggers, a rough, hierarchical male gang, and their female counterparts, the Dagger Debs. A confrontation between the Dagger Debs and a repo man gets all the female members — and Maggie — arrested. Because Maggie is new, a lecherous lesbian warden at the juvenile detention center threatens to physically abuse her. Maggie fights back and eventually the Dagger Debs join her. Subsequently, Dagger Deb leader Lace decides she likes Maggie and entrusts her with running errands while she serves a brief sentence in juvenile hall. One such errand – delivering a love note to Lace's boyfriend, Dominic – ends in Dominic following Maggie home and raping her. Maggie's close friendship with Lace upsets Lace's closest friend, Patch, who lost one of her eyes in service to the gang and now sees herself as second-in-command.

Lace is released from juvenile hall and reunites with Dominic, telling him that she discovered she was pregnant during her incarceration. Dominic disavows fatherhood and refuses to help Lace care for the child, encouraging her to undergo an abortion. Meanwhile, the Silver Daggers have to contend with the arrival of a new gang, led by the villainous Crabs, at the high school. After Crabs shoots Dominic's brother and orchestrates the gang rape of one of the Debs, Maggie devises an ambush on Crabs's men at a local roller rink. The effort proves disastrous when Crabs's men show up armed with rifles, kill Dominic, and brutally assault Lace, causing her to miscarry. While Lace recuperates in the hospital, Maggie assumes leadership of the gang, expels the men and changes its name to the Jezebels. She teams up with Muff and her gang of African-American militants from across town to ambush Crabs. All the while, Maggie suspects that someone in her group tipped Crabs off to their plans at the roller rink, not knowing that Patch has already uncovered the real traitor: Lace, who organized the ambush to get Maggie killed in revenge for her stealing Dom and for assuming the role of leader of the Dagger Debs. Patch agrees to cover for Lace and, after the ambush proves successful, she shoots Crabs before he can confess to Maggie.

Back at the Jezebels' hideout, Lace and Patch attempt to convince the gang that Maggie was the traitor. The members refuse to believe Lace's assertions, and a knife fight ensues between Lace and Maggie. Maggie fatally stabs Lace in the throat, prompting a police strike force that had been surrounding the building to storm in and arrest everyone. The various members of the gang proudly proclaim themselves as members of the Jezebels, but when Patch attempts to identify herself as part of the gang to the police, the remaining members disavow any knowledge of her. The blood-soaked Maggie becomes hysterical as she and the rest of the gang are loaded into the back of a police van, screaming threats that the Jezebels will one day return.

== Cast ==
- Robbie Lee as Lace
- Joanne Nail as Maggie
- Monica Gayle as Patch
- Asher Brauner as Dominic
- Chase Newhart as Crabs
- Marlene Clark as Muff
- Kitty Bruce as Donut
- Janice Karman as Bunny
- Don Stark as Hook
- Kate Murtagh as Mom Smackley

== Production ==
Jack Hill allegedly interviewed real-life female gang members before filming Switchblade Sisters in order to give small details an air of authenticity. While filming, the titles Playgirl Gang and The Jezebels were considered. In the DVD commentary track for the film, Hill states that he assumed not enough people would know what a Jezebel was, so Switchblade Sisters was chosen instead, even though the phrase is not spoken in the film.

Hill stated that Switchblade Sisters was broadly influenced by William Shakespeare's Othello, and both he and Tarantino liken Patch to Iago in the commentary for the film. Hill credited Ayn Rand's The Fountainhead (1943) for inspiring the scene in which a female gang member shrugs off being raped, claiming that this also occurs in Rand's novel.

== Reception ==
On Rotten Tomatoes, the film holds a rating of 57% from 28 reviews.

In 1996, the film was retrospectively reviewed by Siskel and Ebert on their television show, alongside another well-known exploitation film, Sgt. Kabukiman N.Y.P.D. (1990). Siskel said he enjoyed it at first as a "cultural artifact" but lost interest by the third act. Ebert said seeing the film 20 years later was a "shock" because it revealed how much more talented young low budget filmmakers were in the '90s than they had been in the past, declaring Switchblade Sisters to be "amateur night". Siskel and Ebert ultimately gave the film "two thumbs down".

== In popular culture ==
- One of the warden's attendants—listed in the credits as "Matron No. 1"—is played by stuntwoman Jeannie Epper. Epper played the Reverend's wife in the first segment of Kill Bill: Volume 2 (2004). Her daughter Eurlyne also worked with Tarantino, playing a tag-along accomplice of drug dealer Lanna Frank (stuntwoman Monica Staggs) in the Death Proof segment of Grindhouse (2007).
- In 2016, when reviewing proto-punk band Death Valley Girls' album Glow in the Dark, Consequence of Sound critic Ben Kaye wrote, "Pretty much all you need to know about Death Valley Girls can be summed up by the line from the 1975 sexploitation film Switchblade Sisters that became the band's unofficial slogan: 'Everybody's gotta be in a gang.'."

== See also ==
- List of American films of 1975
- List of hood films
