= Kate Murtagh =

American actress (1920–2017)

- Murtagh in 1951
- Born: October 29, 1920; Los Angeles, California, U.S.
- Died: September 10, 2017 (aged 96); Woodland Hills, California, U.S.
- Occupations: Actress; singer-comedienne
- Years active: 1951–1999

Kate Murtagh (October 29, 1920 – September 10, 2017) was an American actress and singer-comedienne.

== Early life ==
Kate Murtagh's parents were both accomplished musicians. Her mother, born Wootson Davis in Sikeston, Missouri, moved to New York City in the early 1910s to further her vocal training. By 1914 she married Henry B. Murtagh. He was a nationally-prominent theater organist, pianist, conductor, and composer who held a series of important posts in major U.S. cities. An early position was a 1920-22 contract at the Liberty Theater in Portland, Oregon. In a 1920 competition, he was selected to write music for Oregon's state song, which was adopted in 1927.

By September 1920 Henry B. Murtagh was engaged at Grauman's in Los Angeles. His several years in Buffalo began in April 1924 at the city's Lafayette Square theater. In the late 1920s he was engaged for Brooklyn's new Paramount Theater.

== Career ==
With her sisters Jean and Onriett, Kate Murtagh performed in a vocal trio coached by her parents while the family lived in Los Angeles. The trio began performing with the goal of singing straight harmony like the Pickens Sisters, whom they idolized, but the performances became more humorous with time. Local radio appearances began as early as 1934. Other performances included such civic organizations as the Monrovia (CA) American Legion Post, and by 1935 they were performing on RKO's vaudeville circuit in Los Angeles.

In Los Angeles, the trio then also worked as the "Three Radio Kittens". They appeared in the 1938 film Freshman Year (1938). The sisters were then also performing summers in a revival of the old melodrama The Drunkard at Theatre Mart in Beverly Hills, and touring in vaudeville on the Pacific coast and states to the east.

Having gained experience, the Murtah Sisters (sic) were able to secure engagements in the large Eastern cities, including Philadelphia's Carman Theater in March–April 1940. They were members of the touring production of Hellzapoppin in 1940-41 before beginning an October–November 1941 engagement at the Bal Tabarin restaurant, San Francisco.

The peak of the trio's success was the wartime years. A few filmed performances—mimed to pre-recordings—survive on soundies filmed in New York in 1942. That year they appeared at the Oriental Theater in Chicago, State Theater in New York, Capitol Theater in Washington, and Chicago's Drake Hotel.

New York performances in 1943 included those at the State Theater, Folies Bergere, and Walton Roof. They also appeared before servicemen and women at the city's Stage Door Canteen three times that year.

The sisters were cast members of the 1944 Broadway revue Take a Bow. Theater and club appearances engagements that year included Washington's Capitol Theater and Chicago's Chez Paree, Chicago Theater, and Latin Quarter.

In 1945, a never-published autobiography of the sisters was announced, to be "ghostwritten by their father" who was continuing to contribute musical and comedy material to their act.

Performances continued in and around New York City in 1945 and 1946. Around the end of 1946, the sisters disbanded the act, leaving Kate (also sometimes billed as "Kate-Ellen Murtah") presenting a solo act of comedy and singing. Onstage, Kate—the tallest of the sisters—was distinguished by her height and physique. She stood 6 feet 1 inch (185 cm) in high heels, with 37 1/2–27 1/2–37-inch (95–70–94 cm) measurements.

She portrayed Melissa Tatum in the 1949 Broadway play Texas, Li'l Darlin. Television appearances, propelled by her appearance in Texas L'il Darlin' included Zeke Manners' show (1950) on WJZ-TV and The Billy Rose Show (1951)

In the 1940s she pursued her painting hobby with seriousness, and in 1955 her one-panel comic "Annie and Fannie" was launched in syndication by New York's United Feature Syndicate.

Murtagh appeared in films including Breakfast at Tiffany's (1961), The Night Strangler (1973), Dirty O'Neil (1974), Switchblade Sisters (1975), Farewell, My Lovely (1975), The Car (1977), Doctor Detroit (1983) and Waxwork II: Lost in Time (1992). On television, she portrayed Iona Dobson in It's a Man's World. She also appeared in other shows, including Daniel Boone, My Three Sons, The Munsters, I Dream of Jeannie, The Twilight Zone and Highway to Heaven.

Murtagh is pictured on the front and back covers of the English rock band Supertramp's 1979 multi-platinum album Breakfast in America. On the front cover she is depicted as a waitress named "Libby", in front of a depiction of New York City, striking a pose similar to that of the Statue of Liberty, but holding a tall glass of orange juice and a menu rather than a torch and tabula ansata.

== Later years ==
Murtagh retired from acting in 1999 and was in her last years a resident at the Motion Picture & Television Country House and Hospital (MPTCHH), in Woodland Hills, California, where she took classes in improvisation. She died at the MPTCHH on September 10, 2017, at the age of 96.
