= DIC Entertainment =

Former film and television production company

DIC Entertainment Corporation
- Logo used from 1987 to 2008

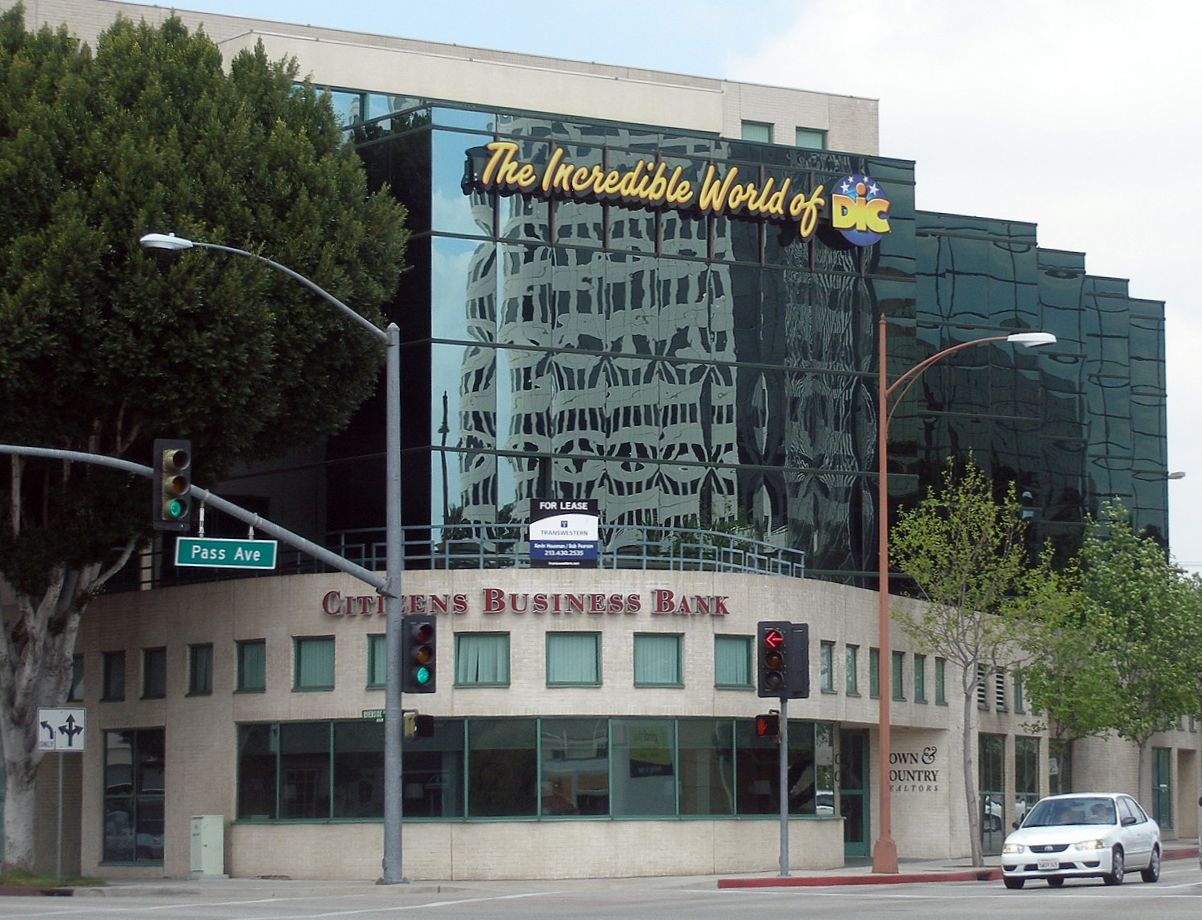
- Former DIC headquarters in Burbank, California
- Formerly: DIC Audiovisuel (1971–1987, French studio); DIC Enterprises, Inc. (1982–1993, U.S. studio); DIC Animation City, Inc. (1985–1993); DIC Entertainment, L.P. (1993–2002); DIC Productions, L.P. (1994–2001)
- Type: Public
- Traded as: LSE: DEKEq.L
- Industry: Animation
- Predecessor: Office de Gestion et d'Action Publicitaire (1968–1971)
- Founded: 1971; 55 years ago
- Founder: Jean Chalopin
- Defunct: July 23, 2008; 18 years ago
- Fate: Acquired by and folded into Cookie Jar Group
- Successor: American unit: Cookie Jar Group; French unit: Créativité et Développement
- Headquarters: 4100 W Alameda Ave, Burbank, CA; Former headquarters: Paris, France
- Key people: Andy Heyward (chairman and CEO)
- Products: Children's television series
- Parent: Compagnie Luxembourgeoise de Télédiffusion (1971–1986); Capital Cities/ABC Video Enterprises, Inc. (1993–1995, limited partnership); The Walt Disney Company (1995–2000, limited partnership)
- Divisions: DIC Consumer Products; DIC Home Entertainment; DIC Tune-Time Audio
- Subsidiaries: Copyright Promotions Licensing Group; DIC Entertainment Europe; DIC Entertainment Holdings, Inc.; DIC Entertainment, L.P.; DIC Productions, L.P.
- Website: dicentertainment.com (archived January 8, 2008)

DIC Entertainment Corporation (/ˈdiːk/; formerly known as DIC Audiovisuel, DIC Enterprises, DIC Animation City, later DIC Entertainment, L.P., and DIC Productions, sometimes stylized as DİC) was a French-American film and television production company and animation studio. As a former division of The Walt Disney Company, DIC produced live-action feature films and licensed numerous anime series.

In 2008, DIC was acquired by Cookie Jar Group in June and was later folded into Cookie Jar in July. As of 2026, most of the DIC library is currently owned by WildBrain (formerly DHX Media) after the company acquired Cookie Jar in October 2012.

== History ==
=== 1971–1982: DIC Audiovisuel ===
Diffusion Information Commercial (DIC) was founded in France in 1971 by Jean Chalopin as part of the Compagnie Luxembourgeoise de Télédiffusion (now RTL Group), a well-established media company as the successor of OGAP (Office de Gestion et d'Action Publicitaire) in 1968 by Chalopin. Initially, DIC focused on producing commercials for television. Chalopin decided to shift his company into the production studio to focused on making animated series.

In 1981, DIC formed a partnership with Tokyo Movie Shinsha, a Japanese animation studio. As part of this collaboration, DIC assisted in animating several TMS programs, including the popular series Ulysses 31. Additionally, DIC created an unaired pilot called Lupin VIII during this period.

This partnership between DIC and TMS continued until 1996, contributing to the production of numerous animated television shows and pilots.

=== 1982–1986: DIC Enterprises ===
DIC Audiovisuel's American division, DIC Enterprises, was established in April 1982 in Burbank, California, by Andy Heyward, a former writer at Hanna-Barbera. This division was created to adapt DIC productions into English for American audiences. DIC Enterprises focused on producing animated television content for both network broadcast and syndication. To reduce costs, DIC outsourced non-creative tasks overseas and employed staff on a per-program basis. Despite its success, some industry insiders referred to DIC as "Do It Cheap".

Under the direction of Bruno Bianchi and Bernard Deyriès, DIC became known for its effective yet cost-conscious approach to animation production. Shortly after its formation, DIC introduced Inspector Gadget, which became one of its most successful productions. DIC also collaborated with toy and greeting card companies to develop character-based product lines that could be adapted into animated series, providing built-in advertisers and financial backers. With hits like Inspector Gadget, The Littles, and Heathcliff, DIC became profitable.

In 1983, DIC established its own animation facility in Japan, known as K.K. DIC Asia, to handle animation production for its shows independently. Despite facing a unionization effort in 1984, DIC remained the only non-union animation firm. Over time, DIC expanded its operations through syndication deals with companies like LBS Communications, Columbia Pictures Television, and Access Syndication. Additionally, DIC secured home video rights for its shows through agreements with Karl-Lorimar Home Video, CBS/Fox Video in the United States, The Video Collection in Great Britain and Access Syndication.

=== 1987–1993: Move to North America ===
Between late 1986 and 1987, Heyward, in collaboration with investors Bear Stearns & Co. and Prudential Insurance Co., acquired Chalopin and the Compagnie Luxembourgeoise de Télédiffusion's 52% stake in DIC, resulting in the transformation of DIC into DIC Animation City, Inc. This acquisition, amounting to $70 million in a leveraged buyout, relocated the company's headquarters to the United States. Following the transaction, key personnel such as Chalopin, Bianchi, Deyriès, and producer Tetsuo Katayama departed DIC, making way for Robby London and Michael Maliani to assume pivotal roles within the organization. Additionally, Chalopin retained control of DIC's original offices in France and its Japanese animation facility, establishing the entity Créativité et Développement (C&D) in 1987 to continue producing animated content. Meanwhile, the Japanese studio was renamed K.K. C&D Asia, operating until 1996.

Subsequent to the buyout, DIC encountered significant financial indebtedness, partly stemming from their competitive strategy of underbidding on projects to outmaneuver rival animation firms, coupled with an overestimation of the market demand for children's television shows. Consequently, DIC's debt escalated, prompting the sale of foreign rights to their library to Saban Productions in 1987, which were later transferred to Chalopin's C&D. This transaction strained the relationship between DIC and Saban, leading to legal disputes culminating in a settlement in 1991. Despite these challenges, DIC expanded its collaborations, partnering with NBC and Coca-Cola Telecommunications to produce and distribute television programs. DIC also ventured into toy manufacturing with the introduction of the Old MacDonald talking toyline.

Amidst legal battles and strategic maneuvers, DIC continued to navigate the evolving landscape of the animation industry. Legal disputes with Family Home Entertainment and LBS/Lorimar Home Video were resolved, paving the way for DIC to forge partnerships with Golden Book Video and pursue distribution agreements with Bohbot Communications. Furthermore, DIC diversified its international collaborations, teaming up with Reteitalia, S.p.A. and Telecinco, among others, to co-produce animated content. By the early 1990s, DIC expanded its operations to include subsidiaries such as Rainforest Entertainment and embarked on educational initiatives.

DIC's growth trajectory was marked by a landmark licensing agreement with Buena Vista Home Video in 1993, facilitating the distribution of over 1,000 half-hours of animated content and the establishment of a dedicated home video label. This deal bolstered DIC's presence in the home entertainment market, heralding a new phase of expansion and consolidation within the animation industry. DIC subsequently signed a deal with Golden Book Video to market titles under the DIC Video brand.

=== 1993–2000: Limited partnerships ===
During the early 1990s, DIC attracted attention within the industry. The company engaged in discussions regarding a potential merger and buyout with PolyGram and Capital Cities/ABC, but no agreements materialized with either entity.

In July 1993, DIC Animation City began the establishment of a limited partnership with Capital Cities/ABC Video Enterprises, Inc., forming a joint venture named DIC Entertainment, L.P. This venture aimed to oversee DIC's production library and supply content for international distribution through CAVE. DIC Animation City held 95% of the shares, while CAVE held the remaining 5%. At the end of the year, the two companies formed another Delaware limited partnership called DIC Productions, L.P., with Capital Cities/ABC holding a 95% majority stake and Heyward retaining the remaining 5%. Both limited partnerships became the successor to the former parent company DIC Animation City, coinciding with the relocation of DIC's headquarters to a larger facility in Burbank, California.

DIC continued its expansion and diversification efforts throughout the early 1990s. In November 1993, it established DIC Interactive, a multimedia unit. Subsequently, the company ventured into live-action television production in 1994. In response to the success of Saban's Mighty Morphin Power Rangers, DIC collaborated with Tsuburaya Productions to adapt the Japanese series Gridman the Hyper Agent into Superhuman Samurai Syber-Squad. DIC also initiated partnerships in China and engaged in syndication agreements with SeaGull Entertainment. In 1995, DIC also produced an English dub of the Japanese anime Sailor Moon.

In July 1995, The Walt Disney Company intended to buy Capital Cities/ABC and all of its assets, including DIC. That October, DIC began planning to establish an animation studio in France in partnership with Hamster Productions. Following the completion of the merger between Capital Cities/ABC and Disney in January 1996, DIC became a subsidiary of The Walt Disney Company. Subsequently, DIC collaborated closely with Disney, launching DIC Films and signing a first-look deal with Walt Disney Pictures in 1996.

In March 1997, DIC's French animation studio commenced operations as Les Studios Tex S.A.R.L. DIC continued its expansion into various markets and mediums, extending its first-look deal with Walt Disney Pictures in March 1998 and commencing the launch of its direct-to-video division the following month. Additionally, DIC secured a programming agreement with Pax TV during this period.

=== 2000–2004: Return to independence ===
In September 2000, Andy Heyward, backed by investment firms Bain Capital and Chase Capital Partners, began to purchase DIC from The Walt Disney Company. Disney agreed to sell back the company and the deal was closed on November 25, officially allowing DIC to produce shows alone again without the limitations of Disney, coinciding with the relaunch of DIC's international sales division at MIPCOM that year.

In 2001, DIC planned to return to the home video market, by forming a new division titled DIC Home Entertainment; they intended to begin releasing products starting that May. This was delayed due to DIC's issues in finding a distribution partner, which eventually happened in July when DIC signed a deal with Lions Gate Home Entertainment for North American distribution of DIC Home Entertainment products. In June, DIC planned a purchase of Golden Books Family Entertainment for $170 million, but they eventually backed out of the deal due to the high costs of the purchase; the company was instead co-purchased by Random House for the book rights and Classic Media for the entertainment rights.

In July 2002, DIC purchased the Mommy & Me preschool label.

In January 2003, DIC announced three syndicated children's programming E/I blocks called DIC Kids Network. In April, DIC sued Speed Racer Enterprises, alleging that SRE had sub-licensed the worldwide exploitation rights for Speed Racer to DIC the previous year and then ended the agreement without DIC knowing. Later in July, DIC signed a television production deal with POW! Entertainment for Stan Lee's Secret Super Six, a series about teens with alien superpowers who are taught about humanity by Lee, but this show never made it to air.

=== 2004–2008: Going public and final years ===
In 2004, Heyward acquired Bain Capital's share in DIC Entertainment and subsequently oversaw the company's public offering on the London Stock Exchange's Alternative Investment Market in 2005, trading under the symbol DEKEq.L. In March 2006, DIC regained international rights to 20 of its shows from The Walt Disney Company and Jetix Europe, previously owned by Disney since their acquisition of Saban Entertainment in 2001. The same month, DIC acquired the Copyright Promotions Licensing Group (CPLG) and welcomed Jeffrey Edell as president and COO.

DIC, AOL's KOL, and CBS Corporation joined forces to introduce a new three-hour programming block for Saturday mornings on CBS called KOL Secret Slumber Party on September 15, 2006. A year later, on the same date, DIC, CBS, and American Greetings launched another programming block named KEWLopolis.

In April 2007, DIC Entertainment, Corus Entertainment's Nelvana, and Sparrowhawk Media announced the establishment of KidsCo, an international children's entertainment network. That October, DIC filed a lawsuit against the Dam company, alleging fraud and negligent misrepresentation regarding Dam's troll doll and DIC's Trollz television series, which was created under a license from Dam. Dam counter-sued DIC, accusing the company of misrepresenting its financial status and harming the troll doll's image and reputation.

=== 2008–2012: Cookie Jar Group merger and DHX Media ===
In June 2008, DIC Entertainment and Canadian media company Cookie Jar Group announced a merger valued at $87.6 million. President Jeffrey Edell played a key role in finalizing the deal, which was completed on July 23 of the same year. Following the merger, DIC became a subsidiary of Cookie Jar, and the company was subsequently folded into Cookie Jar's operations. In August 2009, DIC Entertainment Corporation was rebranded as Cookie Jar Entertainment (USA) Inc. In 2012, Cookie Jar was acquired by DHX Media.

The DIC Kids Network was renamed Cookie Jar Kids Network in 2009 and ceased operations in 2011. Cookie Jar also produced the final season of Sushi Pack, one of DIC's last shows, which aired until 2009. KEWLopolis on CBS was renamed Cookie Jar TV in 2009 and closed down in 2013, replaced by CBS Dream Team. Cookie Jar Toons, a block on This TV featuring shows from Cookie Jar and DIC, ran from 2008 to 2013. In 2014, Cookie Jar ceased operations.

== Programming blocks ==
DIC operated many programming blocks for various television stations across the United States.

Kideo TV was an anthology series that was produced as a joint-venture between DIC Enterprises and their U.S. syndicator LBS Communications, with Mattel handling sponsorships. The block was syndicated to local television stations, with Metromedia stations agreeing to carry the block by January 1986; it launched in April of the same year. Kideo TV aired for 90 minutes and consisted of live-action material with three cartoons from DIC's library used as framing material. Rainbow Brite, Popples and Ulysses 31 first aired on the block, while The Get Along Gang and Lady Lovely Locks were added later on. The "Kideo" brand was also used by LBS as a joint-venture home video line which released various DIC cartoons on VHS.

Weekend Funday was a 90-minute weekend strand produced by DIC that was syndicated through Coca-Cola Telecommunications during the Fall of 1987. Weekend Funday normally ran on Sundays under the name of Funday Sunday, but it would also run on Saturdays as Funtastic Saturday, if it wanted to go head-to-head with the other kidvid blocks. It consisted of various half-hour cartoons from the DIC lineup, including Sylvanian Families and Starcom: The U.S. Space Force.

Funtown was a daily children's programming block on the CBN Family Channel that launched on September 11, 1989. It ran for 26 hours a week, broadcasting from 7:00am–9:00am on weekdays, and 8:00am–11:00am and 4:00pm–6:00pm on weekends. DIC handled the advertising sales of the block, while the CBN Family Channel handled the distribution and marketing. The lineup of shows was a mix of formats, from live-action-animated hybrids to live-action, and programs ranging from original to off-network shows, whether produced by DIC or other companies. In addition, a companion club program was supposed to be developed. DIC also planned to produce four specials each quarter with the launching of Funtown, combined with the others, mostly holiday specials, for the fourth quarter of 1989, but nothing came out of these initial plans.

Dragon Club (Chinese: 小神龙俱乐部 (Little Dragon Club)) was a daily television strand operated and distributed through Capital Cities/ABC through various syndicated television stations in China. It launched on September 19, 1994, and broadcast various DIC and ABC programs in addition to third-party, live-action and local offerings. After the Disney purchase of Capital Cities/ABC, the strand transitioned to airing Disney-produced content and continued to broadcast until the start of 2019. Panda Club (Chinese: 熊猫俱乐部) was the short-lived sister strand of Dragon Club that launched on October 2, 1994, and broadcast on a smaller selection of stations. Its programming was similar to that of Dragon Club, and broadcast until 1999.

Freddy's Firehouse (FFH) was a planned children's educational programming block that would broadcast various programs from DIC Entertainment's library, initially announced in May 1998. In the United States, it was planned to air on Pax TV after DIC signed a deal with the broadcaster to become the exclusive supplier of animated programming on the network. The plan was for the block to run on weekends, running for three hours on Saturday and two hours on Sunday. Buena Vista International Television handled syndication sales, and would also allow for the strand to be sold to other outlets internationally. The block was rejected in favor of Pax producing the children's block in-house, with "Cloud 9" (later renamed "Pax Kids") launching with Pax TV on August 31, 1998, and broadcasting until the end of the contract with DIC in 2000.

National and syndicated broadcast blocks include:

- DiC Kids Network: a set of three syndicated children's programming E/I blocks launched on September 1, 2003.
- KOL Secret Slumber Party: a three-hour long block launched on September 16, 2006, a programming block with partner KOL (AOL's kids online).
- KEWLopolis: launched on September 15, 2007, a programming block with partner American Greetings.

== See also ==
- Cookie Jar TV

== Bibliography ==
- Eluasti, Maroin; Zemrak, Nordine (2012). Les séries de notre enfance (in French). Wambrechies: Pollux. ISBN 978-2-9543363-0-5. Archived from the original on March 5, 2013.
