= Kideo TV =

1986 syndicated anthology package

- Genre: Animation
- Country of origin: United States
- Original language: English

Production
- Running time: 90 minutes
- Production companies: DIC Enterprises; LBS Communications

Original release
- Network: Syndication
- Release: April 1986 – 1987

Kideo TV was a syndicated anthology packaging by DIC Enterprises and LBS Communications, which premiered in April 1986. The show's name is a portmanteau of "kid" and "video".

== Hosts ==
The show was hosted by four youths in auto racing attire with chassis on their shoulders. They included a boy, 4U (Mark Hennessy), and a girl, Euphoria, who were the "good kids" of the show, and they taught lessons to the reckless Fast Lane, a fiery-haired teen with a flame-decorated chassis on his shoulders and the chubby, impressionable Couch Potato. These sketches were under five minutes in length, and their lessons were restated by Bob Keeshan (as Captain Kangaroo), and the youths also did commercial bumpers. While this material was originally credited, no resources have made note of who was involved, and it is omitted from rerun packages.

== Cartoons ==
Each 90-minute show contained three half-hour cartoons from the DIC catalogue:

- The Get Along Gang (September 1986 – 1987) (Note: Replaced Ulysses 31. Jeff Lenburg, in his The Encyclopedia of Animated Cartoons, erroneously claims that The Get-Along Gang was dropped in favor of Rainbow Brite.)
- Lady Lovelylocks and the Pixietails (April 1987 – 1987) (Note: Replaced Rainbow Brite.)
- Popples (April 1986 – 1987)
- Rainbow Brite (April 1986-April 1987)
- Ulysses 31 (April–September 1986)
