= Rainbow Brite (1984 TV series) =

1980s American animated series

- Rainbow Brite title screen
- Genre: Adventure; Fantasy
- Created by: Garry Glissmeyer; Lanny Julian
- Based on: Rainbow Brite by Hallmark Cards
- Written by: Woody Kling; Howard R. Cohen; Felicia Maliani
- Directed by: Bruno Bianchi; Osamu Dezaki; Rich Rudish
- Voices of: Rhonda Aldrich; Bettina Bush; Peter Cullen; Pat Fraley; Jonathan Harris; Robbie Lee; Mona Marshall; David Mendenhall; Marissa Mendenhall; Scott Menville; Andre Stojka
- Composers: Shuki Levy; Haim Saban
- Country of origin: United States
- Original language: English
- No. of seasons: 2
- No. of episodes: 13

Production
- Executive producers: Jean Chalopin; Andy Heyward
- Producer: Tetsuo Katayama
- Running time: 25 minutes
- Production company: DIC Enterprises

Original release
- Network: Kideo TV
- Release: June 27, 1984 – June 28, 1986

Related
- Rainbow Brite and the Star Stealer (1985)

Rainbow Brite is an American animated series based on Hallmark's media franchise of the same name, that ran from 1984 to 1986. Produced by DIC Enterprises with animation provided by TMS Entertainment, the show began as a part of DIC's Kideo TV syndicated anthology package. In this series, Rainbow Brite uses her magical belt to protect the colors of Rainbowland from the bumbling Murky and Lurky.

== Premise ==
=== Series ===
A young girl named Wisp is brought to a dark, desolate land with the mission to bring color to this fictional world by locating the Sphere of Light. Along the way, she befriends a sprite named Twink and a talking horse named Starlite. She also finds a mysterious baby who turns out to be the key to her mission. With the help of her new friends, Wisp locates the legendary Color Belt and rescues the seven Color Kids, whom the King of Shadows had trapped. Using the Color Belt, Wisp defeats the King of Shadows, liberates the sprites, and brings color and beauty to the land, henceforth called Rainbow Land. Wisp is renamed Rainbow Brite by the Sphere of Light in recognition of her leadership role over the Color Kids. Together, Rainbow Brite and the Color Kids are responsible for managing all the colors in the universe.

The Color Kids spread color across the universe from the Color Console inside the Color Castle. Each member of the Color Kids is responsible for a specific color on the visible spectrum. They each have a personal assistant sprite, and are in charge of several sprites that extract Color Crystals from nearby caves. These crystals are processed into Star Sprinkles, which are the essential components to brightening and coloring any object or place. Rainbow Brite and the Color Kids' mission is often complicated by Murky Dismal, his sidekick Lurky, and other villains. Brian, a boy from Earth, sometimes assists Rainbow Brite in her adventures.

=== Film ===
Rainbow Brite and the Color Kids, from the film and series

In Rainbow Brite and the Star Stealer, the setting expands to include the diamond planet, Spectra. All the light in the universe passes through Spectra before coming to Earth, which soon falls into wintry darkness when the diamond-obsessed Dark Princess decides to steal Spectra for her own. Rainbow Brite and her horse Starlite team up with Spectra's boy warrior Krys and his robotic horse On-X. Together, they defeat the powers of darkness and save Spectra, Earth, and the universe.

== Characters ==
=== Main ===
- Rainbow Brite (voiced by Bettina Bush) is the protagonist of the series and film. She is a young girl who uses her magical Color Belt and colors of the Rainbow to bring peace and happiness to all.
- Twink (voiced by Robbie Lee) is Rainbow Brite's loyal friend and personal Sprite.
- Starlite (voiced by Andre Stojka) is Rainbow Brite's faithful friend, a loving but egotistical talking horse.

Color Kids

- Red Butler (voiced by Mona Marshall) is in charge of the color red.
- Lala Orange (voiced by Robbie Lee) is in charge of the color orange.
- Canary Yellow (voiced by M. Marshall) is in charge of the color yellow.
- Patty O'Green (voiced by M. Marshall) is in charge of the color green.
- Buddy Blue (voiced by Pat Fraley) is in charge of the color blue.
- Indigo (voiced by R. Lee) is in charge of the color indigo.
- Shy Violet (voiced by R. Lee) is in charge of the color violet.
- Tickled Pink (voiced by Rhonda Aldrich) is in charge of the color pink, mixing Color Crystals to make other colors such as, pastels, aqua, magenta, and peach.
- Moonglow (voiced by R. Aldrich) is in charge of night colors, making the night sky beautiful and the stars and moon shine bright.

=== Recurring ===
==== Sprites ====
- Romeo is Red Butler's Sprite and he is in charge of the red Sprites that mine red Color Crystals.
- O.J. is Lala Orange's Sprite and he is in charge of the orange Sprites that mine orange Color Crystals.
- Spark is Canary Yellow's Sprite and he is in charge of the yellow Sprites that mine yellow Color Crystals.
- Lucky is Patty O'Green's Sprite and he is in charge of the green Sprites that mine green Color Crystals.
- Champ is Buddy Blue's Sprite and he is in charge of the blue Sprites that mine blue Color Crystals.
- Hammy is Indigo's Sprite and he is in charge of the indigo Sprites that mine indigo Color Crystals.
- I.Q. is Shy Violet's Sprite and he is in charge of the violet Sprites that mine violet Color Crystals.
- Dee Lite is tickled Pink's Sprite and she is in charge of helping mix Color Crystals for new colors.
- Nite Sprite is Moonglow's Sprite and he is in charge of growing and protecting the gold Color Crystals and helps in making the night sky shiny and bright.

==== Humans ====
- Baby Brite is an alternative guise of the Sphere of Light.
- Stormy (voiced by Marissa Mendenhall) is a weather worker and lives in the clouds. She holds power over winter, thunder, rain, lightning and other forms of bad weather.
- Krys (voiced by David Mendenhall) is a young boy warrior and protector of the planet Spectra, and the wearer of the magical Prism wrist device that functions like Rainbow Brite's Color Belt.
- Brian (voiced by Scott Menville) is a boy from Earth and aspiring baseball player who befriended Rainbow Brite when he ended up in Rainbow Land. Though he first appeared in the film, he later appeared in some episodes of the series.

==== Pets ====
- Skydancer is Stormy's mighty horse. A purple horse with a white lightning bolt on his forehead, he is capable of fast flying and running, and can stand on clouds and thin air.
- Sunriser is Tickled Pink's fun loving horse. She is a pink horse with a golden sun across her forehead.
- Shimmer is Moonglow's loyal blue horse with a violet crescent moon across her forehead.
- On-X (voiced by Pat Fraley) is Krys's robotic talking horse. He can sense danger, alert and protect Krys and others. He has rockets on the bottom of his feet that enables him to fly.

==== Spectra Sprites ====
- Orin (voiced by Les Tremayne) is a wise, brave and magical eler Sprite, former owner of the Prism and On-X, who taught, mentored and chose Krys to replace him as protector of the planet Spectra.
- Bombo and Popo are polisher class Sprites, along with other Sprites that help keep Spectra's diamond surface scratch and dust free, as more light could pass through it and into the universe.

==== Villains ====
- Murky Dismal (voiced by Peter Cullen) is one of the main antagonists in the series and film. He is an evil scientist and resides in the last dark area of Rainbow Land known as The Pits.
  - Lurky (voiced by P. Fraley) is Murky Dismal's imposing but dimwitted sidekick. He resembles a giant brown Sprite with a big nose.
- The Dark Princess (voiced by R. Aldrich) is the titular antagonist in the film who later became one of the main antagonists of the series during the final season.
  - Count Blogg (voiced by Jonathan Harris) is The Dark Princess loyal servant and advisor.
  - Sergeant Zombo (voiced by David Workman) is a warden of the Prison Planet and takes orders by the Dark Princess to enslave her betrayers.
    - Glitterbots are a large mechanical robots in charge with keeping the Sprites of Spectra under control by order of Sergeant Zombo.

== Episodes ==
=== Season 1 (1984-85) ===
No.	Title	Directed by	Written by	Original release date
1	"The Beginning of Rainbowland, Part I"	Bernard Deyries	Howard R. Cohen	June 27, 1984
A colorless wasteland is ruled by an Evil Force that took the form of wind and storm. A little girl named Wisp is sent to find the light and color of this desolate land and set it free. Her only hope is to find the magical color belt, but many obstacles stand in her path.
2	"The Beginning of Rainbowland, Part II"	Bernard Deyries	Howard R. Cohen	July 4, 1984
After Wisp has found the magic Color Belt, she and her friends Twink Sprite and Starlite, find the seven Color Kids. Together, they defeat the King of Shadows to set the colors free, but Murky Dismal and Lurky, the evil force's minions are still trying to stop her. When Wisp and her friends succeed at her mission, the land becomes bright, colorful, and is remained Rainbow Land. Wisp is renamed Rainbow Brite and becomes its leader.
3	"Peril in the Pits"	Osamu Dezaki	Woody Kling	December 5, 1984
While attempting to cheer up an 11-year-old boy named Brian, Rainbow Brite accidentally covers him with colors and must take him to Rainbow Land to remove them. While in Rainbow Land, Murky Dismal and his assistant Lurky have plans of their own and cause trouble by kidnapping the Color Kids. Aided by her horse Starlite, favorite Sprite Twink, and new friend Brian, Rainbow Brite must now save the day.
4	"The Mighty Monstromurk Menace, Part I"	Bernard Deyries	Woody Kling	April 22, 1985
Rainbow Land is a mess when one of Murky Dismal's most dangerous creations, called the Monstromurk, escapes his prison with plans of becoming King of Rainbow Land and destroying all the colors.
5	"The Mighty Monstromurk Menace, Part II"	Bernard Deyries	Woody Kling	April 23, 1985
Murky has trapped Rainbow Brite in a magic bottle and it is now up to her friends to rescue her.

=== Season 2 (1986) ===
No.	Title	Directed by	Written by	Original release date
6	"Invasion of Rainbowland"	Rich Rudish	Howard R. Cohen	May 10, 1986
A space alien named Wajah has crash landed on Rainbow Land and needs Rainbow Brite's help to return home. It ends up that the alien himself eats colors and when Murky Dismal finds this out, he plans on keeping Wajah in Rainbow Land with hopes of destroying it.
7	"Mom"	Rich Rudish	Howard R. Cohen	May 17, 1986
Murky Dismal's mom comes for a visit, and Murky goes above and beyond to try to impress his mother by telling her he is in charge of Rainbow Land. This little lie takes on a life of its own as he attempts to take over Rainbow Land and murk it up while Rainbow Brite is away.
8	"Rainbow Night"	Rich Rudish	Howard R. Cohen	May 24, 1986
Murky Dismal attempts to take all the color from the night when he kidnaps Moonglow, the color kid who makes the night shine. Rainbow Brite must rescue her or risk dark nights forever.
9	"Star Sprinkled"	Rich Rudish	Howard R. Cohen	May 31, 1986
When a sneaking intergalactic salesman tricks Twink into signing over the Color Caves, Rainbow Brite and her friends have to convince him that they need them back for more than just profit.
10	"Chasing Rainbows"	Rich Rudish	Howard R. Cohen	June 7, 1986
Murky Dismal tries his greatest trick yet, by creating a "Rainbow Brite Robot" to trick her friends, but can they be tricked.
11	"Murky's Comet"	Rich Rudish	Felicia Maliani	June 14, 1986
When a wizard barters for spaceship repairs with a magic spell to destroy Rainbow Land with a comet, Rainbow Brite has to find a way to stop it before it crashes into the color caves and destroys the Rainbow Land.
12	"A Horse of a Different Color"	Rich Rudish	Howard R. Cohen	June 21, 1986
Murky Dismal kidnaps Starlite and On-X in a horse race with a plan to pollute Rainbow Land, but with the help of Sunriser, a new Rainbow Land horse, his plans soon become undone.
13	"The Queen of the Sprites"	Rich Rudish	Howard R. Cohen	June 28, 1986
The Dark Princess from the Star Stealer film returns for another showdown with Rainbow Brite and her attempt to become Queen of the Sprites and take over Rainbow Land.
