= The Emperor's New Groove (franchise) =

Disney media franchise

- Created by: Roger Allers; Matthew Jacobs; Chris Williams; Mark Dindal; David Reynolds
- Original work: The Emperor's New Groove (2000)
- Owner: The Walt Disney Company
- Years: 2000–present

Films and television
- Films: The Emperor's New Groove (2000); The Sweatbox (2002); Kronk's New Groove (2005)
- Animated series: The Emperor's New School (2006–2008)
- Direct-to-video: Kronk's New Groove (2005)

Games
- Video games: The Emperor's New Groove (2000); Disney's The Emperor's New Groove Groove Center (2001)

Audio
- Soundtrack: The Emperor's New Groove (2000)

The Emperor's New Groove is a Disney media franchise that started in 2000 with the release of the animated feature film of the same name, produced by Walt Disney Feature Animation and released by Walt Disney Pictures.

== Films ==
- The Emperor's New Groove is a 2000 American animated comedy film produced by Walt Disney Animation Studios and released by Walt Disney Pictures on December 15, 2000.
- Kronk's New Groove, also known as The Emperor's New Groove 2: Kronk's New Groove, is a 2005 direct-to-video animated musical comedy film released by The Walt Disney Company on December 13, 2005. The film is the sequel and spin-off to the 2000 animated film The Emperor's New Groove.

== Documentary films ==
The Sweatbox is a documentary designed to show behind the scenes footage of Kingdom of the Sun. In reality, it illustrated the slow and painful transformation from Kingdom of the Sun to The Emperor's New Groove, including the director, Sting (whose wife created the documentary), artists, and voice cast being dismayed by the new direction. Its major theme is creative-executive conflicts.

== Unproduced film ==
- Kingdom of the Sun was the original draft of the film that went through massive changes and eventually became The Emperor's New Groove. It is considered a different film despite being vaguely cosmetically reminiscent of the finished one. It was described as being an epic film on par with The Lion King as opposed to the buddy comedy it became. The plot was more akin to The Prince and the Pauper and focused on llama herder Pacha (voiced by Owen Wilson) and emperor Manco Capac (still voiced by Spade) discovering their visual similarities and switching places with one another. Yzma (still voiced by Kitt) was an evil witch and vizier who would transform Manco into a llama so that she could use him for the annual sacrifice and summon the shadow demon Supai to block out the sun and restore her youth. Much of the animation and even original audio can be seen in The Sweatbox documentary.

== TV series ==
- The Emperor's New School is an American animated television series that aired on Disney Channel. The show is based on the characters from The Emperor's New Groove and its direct-to-video sequel Kronk's New Groove, with several contradictions to both films. It aired from 2006–2008.

== Books ==
A Little Golden Books edition of the movie, written by Frank Berrios and illustrated by Hollie Mengert, came out in September 2025.

== Video games ==
- The Emperor's New Groove is a video game based upon the 2000 film of the same name, developed by Argonaut Games for the PlayStation and Microsoft Windows, and by Sandbox Studios for the Game Boy Color.
- The Emperor's New Groove Groove Center is a part of the Disney's Activity Center series, which allows the player to do activities that tie into the film upon what it is based.

== Music ==
- The Emperor's New Groove is the soundtrack to the film, which included many songs that were originally written for Kingdom of the Sun and then discarded.
- My Funny Friend and Me is a song by English musician Sting. It was written by Sting and David Hartley, and received an Academy Award nomination for Best Original Song at the 73rd Academy Awards in 2001.
- Snuff out the Light was the deleted villain song from Kingdom of the Sun, to be sung by Yzma (played by Eartha Kitt). It demonstrated that she thought light made people age, so if she could force the world into total darkness she could be beautiful and young forever.

== Other media ==
- Kuzco, Pacha, Yzma and the Royal Recordkeeper have guest appearances in the animated television series House of Mouse. Kuzco also appears in the series' direct-to-video film Mickey's Magical Christmas: Snowed in at the House of Mouse.
- In the world builder video game Disney Magic Kingdoms, Kuzco, Pacha, Yzma and Kronk appear as playable characters, as well as attractions based on Mudka's Meat Hut and Yzma's Lair, being unlocked during the progress of the game's main storyline. In the game the characters are involved in new storylines that serve as a continuation of The Emperor's New Groove (ignoring other material in the franchise).
- An alternate version of Kuzco appears as a playable character in the video game Disney Mirrorverse.
- Kuzco, Pacha, Yzma and Kronk appeared in Once Upon a Studio (2023).

== Common elements ==
=== Cast and characters ===
List indicators
- A dark gray cell indicates the character was not featured in that installment.
- A ^{Y} indicates a voice actress portrayed a younger version of their character.

Characters	Films		Television series	
Characters	The Emperor's New Groove	Kronk's New Groove	The Emperor's New School	
Characters	The Emperor's New Groove	Kronk's New Groove	Season 1	Season 2
Emperor Kuzco	David Spade	David Spade	J. P. Manoux	J. P. Manoux
Pacha	John Goodman	John Goodman	Fred Tatasciore	John Goodman
Yzma	Eartha Kitt	Eartha Kitt	Eartha Kitt	Eartha Kitt
Yzma	Mark Dindal (Note: Dindal provided the voice of Yzma in scenes in which the character takes the form of a cat.)	Eartha Kitt	Eartha Kitt	Grey DeLisle^{Y}
Kronk Pepikrankenitz	Patrick Warburton	Patrick Warburton	Patrick Warburton	Patrick Warburton
Chicha	Wendie Malick	Wendie Malick	Wendie Malick	Wendie Malick
Chaca	Kellyann Kelso	Jessie Flower	Jessie Flower	Jessie Flower
Tipo	Eli Russell Linnetz	Eli Russell Linnetz	Shane Baumel	Shane Baumel
Bucky	Bob Bergen	Bob Bergen	Bob Bergen	Bob Bergen
Rudy	John Fiedler	John Fiedler	Travis Oates	Travis Oates
Topo	Andre Stojka	Jeff Bennett	Jeff Bennett	Jeff Bennett
Ipi	Stephen Anderson	Jeff Bennett	Jeff Bennett	Jeff Bennett
Matta	Patti Deutsch	Patti Deutsch		Patti Deutsch
Royal Recordkeeper	Joe Whyte		Rip Taylor	Rip Taylor
Miss Birdwell		Tracey Ullman		
Papi		John Mahoney		Jeff Bennett
Marge		April Winchell		
Tina		April Winchell		
Malina			Jessica DiCicco	Jessica DiCicco
Flaco Moleguaco			Curtis Armstrong	Curtis Armstrong

=== Crew ===
Films	Director(s)	Producer	Writer	Story	Composer
The Emperor's New Groove	Mark Dindal	Randy Fullmer	David Reynolds	Chris Williams and Mark Dindal	John Debney
Kronk's New Groove	Elliot M. Bour & Saul Andrew Blinkoff	John A. Smith	Tom Rogers	Tony Leondis & Michael LaBash and Tom Rogers	Mark Watters

Film	Critical		Public
Film	Rotten Tomatoes	Metacritic	CinemaScore
The Emperor's New Groove	86% (135 reviews)	70% (28 reviews)	A
Kronk's New Groove	0% (7 reviews)	—N/a	—N/a
