= The Emperor's New Groove (disambiguation) =

The Emperor's New Groove is a 2000 animated film from Walt Disney Pictures.

The Emperor's New Groove may also refer to:

- The Emperor's New Groove (franchise)
- The Emperor's New Groove (soundtrack)
- The Emperor's New Groove (video game)
- Kronk's New Groove (also known as The Emperor's New Groove 2: Kronk's New Groove), sequel to The Emperor's New Groove film
