= The Sweatbox =

2002 American documentary film

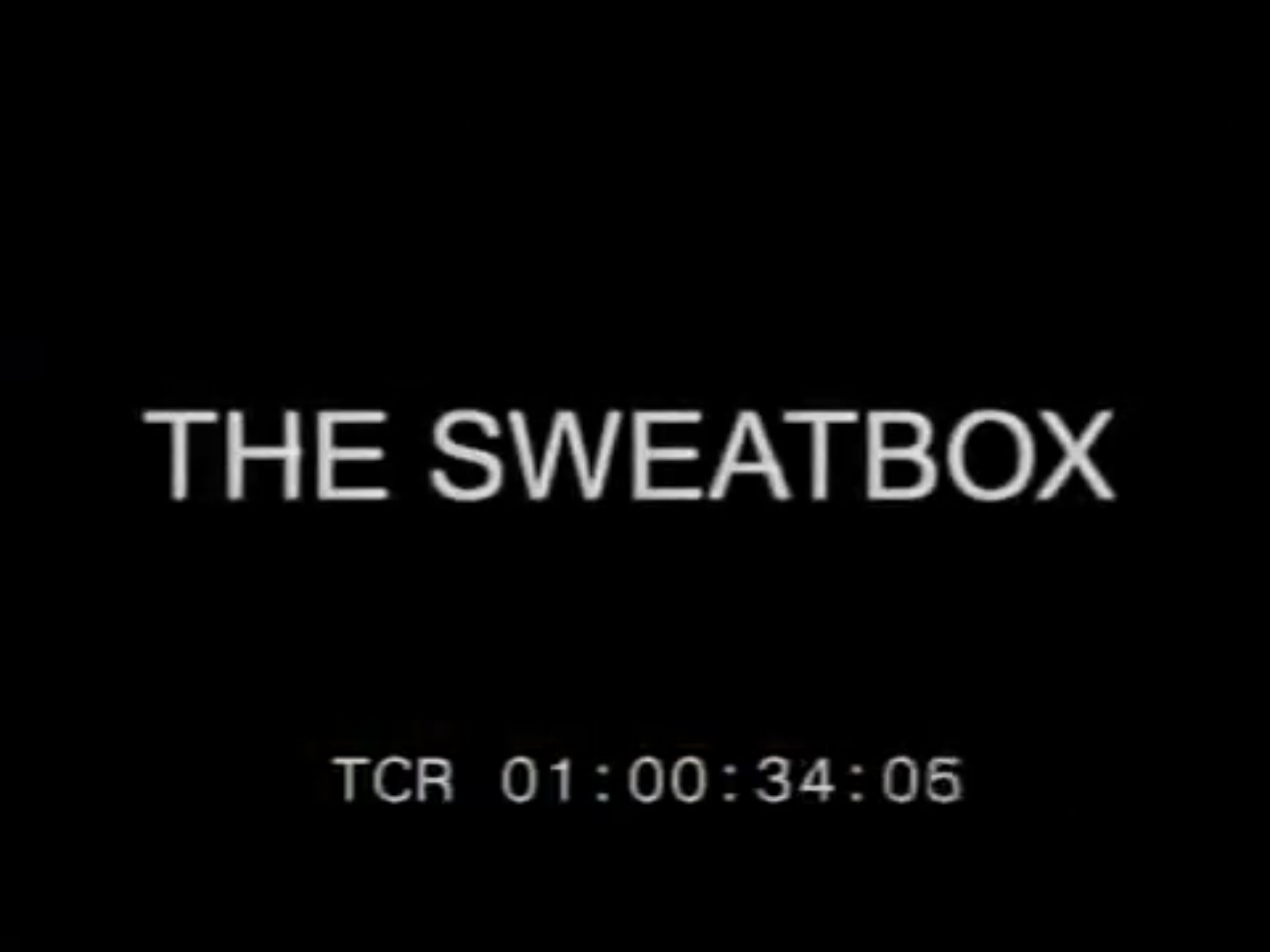
- Titlecard
- Directed by: Trudie Styler; John-Paul Davidson
- Produced by: Trudie Styler; John-Paul Davidson
- Cinematography: Neil Brown
- Edited by: Susanne Rostock
- Music by: David Hartley
- Production companies: Walt Disney Pictures; Xingu Films
- Distributed by: Buena Vista Pictures
- Release date: September 13, 2002 (Toronto International Film Festival)
- Running time: 95 minutes
- Country: United States
- Language: English

The Sweatbox is a 2002 American documentary film produced and directed by Trudie Styler, which documents the production of the Walt Disney Pictures film The Emperor's New Groove. Utilizing behind-the-scenes footage and interviews, it illustrates the slow and painful transformation of the original version of the film (titled Kingdom of the Sun) to the finished product, with a focus on Sting's work on the soundtrack. The documentary's major theme is creative-executive conflicts.

== Background ==
Trudie Styler, a documentarian, had been allowed to film the production of Kingdom of the Sun/The Emperor's New Groove as part of the deal that originally brought her husband Sting to the project. As a result, Styler recorded on film much of the struggle, controversy, and troubles that went into making the picture (including the moment when producer Fullmer called Sting to inform the pop star that his songs were being deleted from the film). Disney owns the rights to the documentary and has not released it on home video or DVD.

The naming is due to the screening room at the Disney studio in Burbank, which when originally set up had "no air conditioning, causing the animators to sweat while their rough work was being critiqued." The "process of reviewing the animation as it developed" became known as the Sweatbox, and as the documentary was about "the process of making an animated film," the term was chosen as the title. This "making of" documentary was co-directed by Styler and John-Paul Davidson.

The 95-minute film, which was originally supposed to be released at the beginning of 2001, was instead altered for bonus featurette on New Groove’s DVD release. A Disney-approved version of the film received a worldwide premiere at the Toronto International Film Festival on September 13, 2002. It also had a short run at the Loews Beverly Center Cineplex of Los Angeles "in an unpublicized one-week run in order to be eligible for an Academy Award nomination". In addition to this, the film was also "shown at The Enzian theater in Orlando as part of the Florida Film Festival".

== Synopsis ==
In 1997, director Roger Allers asks British singer-songwriter Sting to help write the music to a new Disney animated feature titled Kingdom of the Sun, which is intended to be an exploration of the culture of the Incas. Sting is excited about the idea of working on a Disney film, and signs up to the project. The documentary follows the writers, animators and voice actors as they work together to realise Allers' vision, while Sting, in collaboration with David Hartley, creates the music for the soundtrack, with songs including "Walk the Llama Llama", "One Day She'll Love Me" and "Snuff Out the Light" (sung by Eartha Kitt). The crew then present their story reels to executive producers Thomas Schumacher and Peter Schneider. The producers are dissatisfied, finding the story too complex, the pacing too slow, and the tone of the movie too confused. As a result, the entire film will have to be rewritten.

Allers and the crew are taken aback, feeling that all of their hard work has been for nothing. They concoct a new plot, though the animators are concerned about the sudden change of direction, with many worried that their contributions will not make it into the final film. Mark Dindal replaces Allers as director, with the title now slightly changed to Kingdom in the Sun. Actor Owen Wilson is replaced by John Goodman, and the Prince and the Pauper-style storyline is scrapped, with the film reworked into a comical farce. The new proposed plot earns the approval of Schneider and Schumacher.

Sting, though frustrated that the songs he has written for the previous storyline can no longer be used, continues to work on the film, writing a theme song ("Perfect World") and a song for the closing credits ("My Funny Friend and Me"). After seeing the story reels of the new film, he writes a letter of protest to the producers regarding the ending, in which Emperor Kuzco still builds his theme park and waterslide despite his moral transformation. His comments are passed on to the animation team, and the ending is altered to be more in line with the message of the film. As the film nears completion, the title is changed once again to The Emperor's New Groove. A musical score is composed by Marc Shaiman, but the producers are not happy with it, and John Debney is taken on instead to score the film. The documentary ends with Schumacher discussing the lessons he has learned about the production process, producer Don Hahn expressing his satisfaction with how the film turned out, and Sting reflecting that the artistic constraints that were placed upon him have ultimately improved the quality of his music.

== Reception ==
On the review aggregator website Rotten Tomatoes, 100% of 7 critics' reviews are positive, with an average rating of 7.2/10.

According to Wade Sampson, staff writer at MousePlanet who attended a screening, each time Tom Schumacher or Peter Schneider (then-Disney Feature Animation president and Disney Studios chairman respectively) were on the screen, "there were howls from the audience that was partly composed of animators from Disney Feature Animation Florida." He says that "the two executives did come across as nerdy bullies who really didn't seem to know what was going on when it came to animation," and that they "were unnecessarily hurtful and full of politically correct speech." He adds that it is left to the viewer to decide if this impression is due to editing or a "remarkable truthful glimpse." Sampson adds, "Rarely have artists been caught so evocatively in fear of executives, or executives portrayed as so clueless as to how to deal with artists, how to resolve story problems and how to understand what audiences wanted." He says that "supporters of Allers' original vision still feel that if he had been given the time, money and support that the film would have been a masterpiece," but "instead of the more ambitious Kingdom of the Sun, the Disney Studio decides to go with a supposedly more commercial film incorporating some of the same characters and location, Emperor's New Groove."

Although the film in its completed form had been kept under wraps for about a decade, on March 21, 2012, it was leaked online by an eighteen-year-old cartoonist in the UK.

After the documentary was leaked online, Amid Amidi of Cartoon Brew gave the following analysis of the film:

The Sweatbox is at turns infuriating, hilarious and enlightening. You’ll cringe in sympathy with the Disney artists as you see the gross bureaucratic incompetence they had to endure while working at the studio in the 1990s. The film not only captures the tortured morphing of the Kingdom of the Sun into The Emperor’s New Groove, it also serves as an invaluable historical document about Disney’s animation operations in the late-1990s. If any questions remain about why Disney fizzled out creatively and surrendered its feature animation crown to Pixar and DreamWorks, this film will answer them.

== Appearances ==
- Mark Dindal
- Sting
- Roger Allers
- Andreas Deja
- David Spade
- Patrick Warburton
- Eartha Kitt
- John Goodman
- Thomas Schumacher
- Roy E. Disney
- David Hartley
- Randy Fullmer
- David Reynolds
- Peter Schneider
- Don Hahn
- Joe Ranft
- John Musker
- Ron Clements
- Gary Trousdale
- Kirk Wise
- Dale Baer
- Tony Bancroft
- Tom Jones
- Owen Wilson
- Marc Shaiman
- Bruce W. Smith
- John Debney
- Harvey Fierstein
