= The Polar Bears =

- Film poster
- Directed by: John Stevenson; David Scott
- Written by: David Reynolds
- Produced by: Ridley Scott; Tony Scott; Michael Costigan
- Starring: Lin-Manuel Miranda; Armie Hammer; Jonathan Adams; Megyn Price; Lola Augspurger
- Edited by: David Burrows; Jonathan Tappin
- Music by: Edward Shearmur
- Production companies: Scott Free Productions; Animal Logic
- Distributed by: The Coca-Cola Company
- Release date: December 31, 2012
- Running time: 7 minutes
- Countries: United States; Australia
- Language: English

The Polar Bears is a 2012 animated short film presented by The Coca-Cola Company, produced by Ridley Scott, written by David Reynolds, and directed by John Stevenson. The film features the voices of Lin-Manuel Miranda, Armie Hammer, Jonathan Adams, and Megyn Price. The film is based on the Coca-Cola polar bears and was released on the company's website and YouTube channel on December 31, 2012.

== Plot ==
Kaskae is a polar bear that travels with his family across the Arctic Circle to give a speech to his family. Jak, the teenage troublemaker in the family, is given the task of looking after his little sister Kaia along with his older brother Zook. Hearing part of Kaskae's speech about reaching new heights, Jak rushes to the peak of the tundra with Zook trailing him. As soon as both brothers reach the top, Jak shoves Zook before they both slide down and crash their father's speech. The family then discovers an unattended Kaia dancing with a flock of Atlantic puffins. The other polar bears are not amused by the scene, as their kind are not supposed to socialize with the puffins, but Jak jumps in the water to join in the fun. Kaskae then orders everyone to be silent before he and the rest of the family jump in to play in the water.

== Cast ==
- Lin-Manuel Miranda as Jak
- Armie Hammer as Zook
- Jonathan Adams as Kaskae
- Megyn Price as Sakari
- Lola Augspurger as Kaia
- Jenna Lamia as Polar Girl 1
- Anne Gregory as Polar Girl 2

== See also ==
- The Real Bears
