= Broadcast Film Critics Association Awards 2001 =

Broadcast Film Critics Association Awards 2001 may refer to:

- 6th Critics' Choice Awards, the sixth Critics' Choice Awards ceremony that took place in 2001
- 7th Critics' Choice Awards, the seventh Critics' Choice Awards ceremony that took place in 2002 and which honored the best in film for 2001
