= The Emperor's New Groove (soundtrack) =

Soundtrack album by Various artists
- Released: November 14, 2000
- Genres: Soundtrack, film score
- Length: 48:55
- Label: Walt Disney
- Producers: Various artists John Debney

Singles from The Emperor's New Groove
- 1. "My Funny Friend and Me" Released: November 14, 2000

The Emperor's New Groove is the soundtrack to the 2000 Disney film The Emperor's New Groove. It features vocal performances by Shawn Colvin, Tom Jones, Eartha Kitt, Rascal Flatts, and Sting. The album was released in 2000 by Walt Disney Records. The music and lyrics are by Sting and David Hartley, and the score composed, produced and conducted by John Debney. The album included many songs that were written for Kingdom of the Sun, the original incarnation for the project. It also included Spanish and Italian versions of "My Funny Friend and Me".

== Production ==
The Emperor's New Groove was one of the first Disney films after 1999's Tarzan that was not a traditional musical, but only featured a few minor songs. The project was originally intended to be a musical film and many songs cut from the film as the plot changed are included in the soundtrack.

JustPressPlay explains:

The Sweatbox, which has been almost entirely buried and forgotten by Disney...follows the production of the film from phase 1 as part of the deal made with Sting to write the film's soundtrack (a soundtrack which was left almost entirely on the cutting room floor save for the song which cuts awkwardly in at the start of the credits).

== Track listing ==
No.	Title	Writer(s)	Performer	Length
1.	"Perfect World"	David Hartley, Sting	Tom Jones	2:21
2.	"My Funny Friend and Me"	Hartley, Sting	Sting	4:38
3.	"Snuff Out the Light (Yzma's Song)"	Hartley, Sting	Eartha Kitt	3:37
4.	"Walk the Llama Llama"	Hartley, Sting	Rascal Flatts	2:02
5.	"Perfect World (Reprise)"	Hartley, Sting	Tom Jones	2:33
6.	"Run, Llama, Run" (Score)	John Debney	John Debney	2:25
7.	"One Day She'll Love Me"	Hartley, Sting	Sting & Shawn Colvin	4:11
8.	"A New Hope" (Score)	Debney	John Debney	1:46
9.	"Beware the Groove" (Score)	Debney	John Debney	8:15
10.	"The Jungle Rescue" (Score)	Debney	John Debney	3:17
11.	"Pacha's Homecoming/The Blue Plate Special" (Score)	Debney	John Debney	7:32
12.	"The Great Battle/Friends Forever" (Score)	Debney	John Debney	6:18
Total length:				48:55

=== Bonus tracks ===
No.	Title	Writer(s)	Performer	Length
13.	"Un Amigo Como Tú" (Spanish version of "My Funny Friend and Me")	Hartley, Sting	Sting	4:38
14.	"Un Amico Come Te" (Italian version of "My Funny Friend and Me")	Hartley, Sting	Sting	4:38
Total length:				58:11
