= Coca-Cola polar bears =

Polar bears
- Coca-Cola character
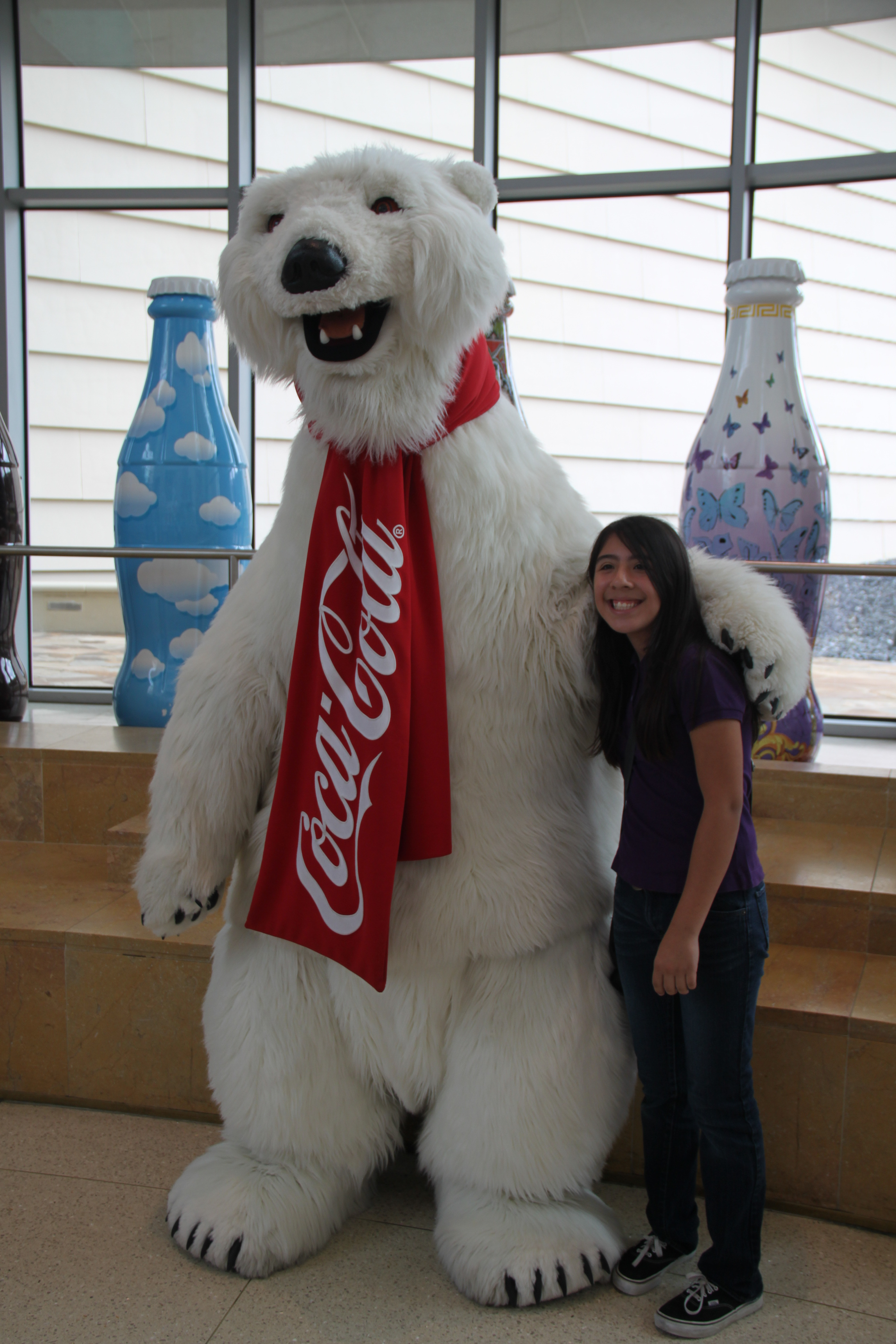
- A polar bear costume at World of Coca-Cola
- First appearance: Northern Lights; 1993; 33 years ago; 1922; 104 years ago (Earliest)
- Created by: Ken Stewart

The Coca-Cola polar bears are polar bear characters used as mascots for the Coca-Cola Company. The animated characters have been a popular element in Coca-Cola advertising since 1993, and the company sells merchandise, such as tumblers and plush versions of the bears.

== History ==
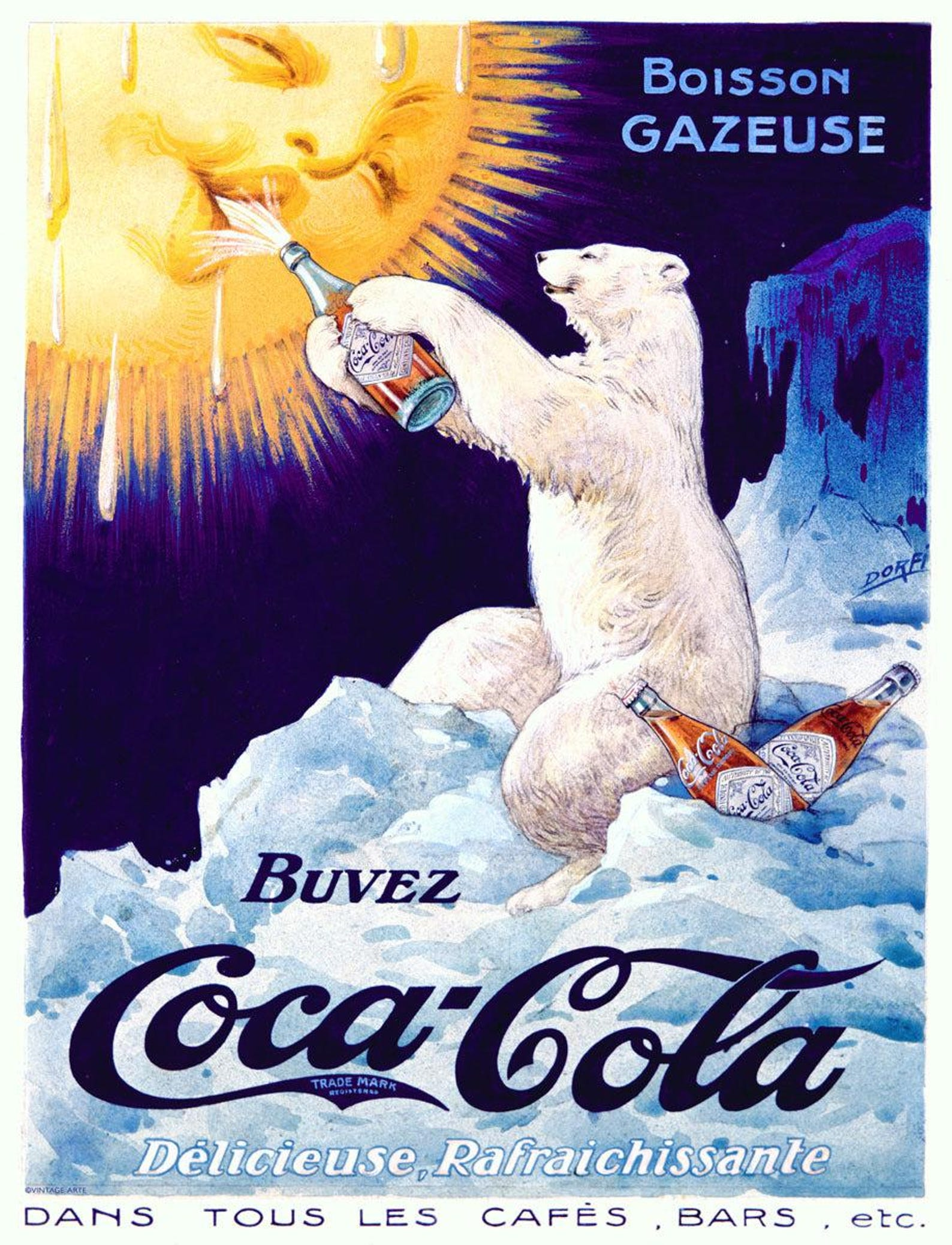
1922 French advertisement depicting a polar bear squirting Coca-Cola into the mouth of a thirsty anthropomorphized sun

The Coca-Cola Company first used a polar bear in a 1922 French advertisement depicting a bear squirting Coca-Cola into the mouth of a thirsty anthropomorphized sun. However, the use of the characters was sporadic until 1993. That year, the Coca-Cola polar bears appeared in an animated film called Northern Lights (which was part of the "Always Coca-Cola" promotion that debuted during the commercial breaks of Game 3 of the 1993 NBA Finals) where they gathered to drink Coca-Cola and watch the Aurora Borealis, which was successful with consumers. The use of polar bears in the 1993 ad campaign was, according to creator Ken Stewart, inspired by his labrador retriever dog which resembled a polar bear. The polar bear has since become "one of the most popular symbols of Coca-Cola." Following the success of Northern Lights, the Coca-Cola Company has produced many more commercials and films with anthropomorphic polar bears, as well as products such as tumblers and plush bears. There's also a walkaround costume of the Coca-Cola polar bear at World of Coca-Cola designed by Jim Henson's Creature Shop.

=== Winning an injunction ===
In 1995, the Coca-Cola Company won an injunction against the Polar Corporation, a family-run soft-drink company, for running an advertisement in which a polar bear threw away a can of Coca-Cola. The court ruled that the Polar Corporation could continue to use the polar bear character, but that it could not show it throwing away Coca-Cola.

=== Super Bowl campaign ===
In 2012, the Coca-Cola Company created a live advertising campaign that had polar bears react to the Super Bowl, which was described as "a brilliant marketing move".

=== Pepsi commercial ===
In January 2026, Pepsi released a commercial ahead of Super Bowl LX directed by Taika Waititi in which the polar bear partakes in the Pepsi Challenge and is shocked to end up choosing Pepsi over Coca-Cola. The commercial used the tagline "You deserve better. You deserve Pepsi." The commercial was seen as both an attempt to restart the cola wars as well as a personal attack on The Coca-Cola Company regarding its own recent Christmas commercials, which became controversial due to them being made entirely using generative AI. The commercial also had the polar bear be caught at a concert holding a Pepsi can with another polar bear, referencing an incident at a Coldplay concert in which a man was caught having an affair on a kiss cam.

== Controversy ==
In 2011, the Coca-Cola Company pledged to donate US$2 million to the World Wildlife Fund to protect polar bears, but has been criticised for giving such a relatively small amount of money compared to their advertising budget and profits.

In 2011, the company changed its drink cans from red to white with images of polar bears for the Holiday season, but consumers protested the change. The Coca-Cola Company reverted the change after one month.

== See also ==
- Cola wars
- The Polar Bears
- The Real Bears
