= Pryzm: Chapter One - The Dark Unicorn =

2002 video game

- Developer: Digital Illusions Canada
- Publisher: TDK Mediactive
- Director: Gary Corriveau
- Producer: Mikael Rudberg
- Designers: Atman Binstock, Gary Corriveau, Tom Galt, Armando Marini
- Writer: David Artuso
- Composers: David Kerr, Clandro Cautillo
- Platform: PlayStation 2
- Release: June 11, 2002

Pryzm: Chapter One - The Dark Unicorn is a third-person action game developed by Digital Illusions Canada and published by TDK Mediactive in 2002 for the PlayStation 2. The game takes place in a fantasy world and follows a wizard named Karrock who rides atop a unicorn named Pryzm, who set off on an adventure to destroy a plague ravaging their otherwise peaceful lands. The game received positive-to-mixed reviews from critics.
