= Matchbox: Emergency Patrol =

2001 video game

- Game Boy Color version cover
- Developers: Sandbox Studios (Windows); Lucky Chicken Games (GBC)
- Publisher: THQ (Note: As the game had finished production after its closure, the Mattel Interactive logo and branding appear in game.)
- Platforms: Windows, Game Boy Color
- Release: Game Boy Color; 5 June 2001; PC; 22 August 2001
- Genre: Racing
- Mode: Single-player

Matchbox: Emergency Patrol is a 2001 racing video game for Microsoft Windows and the Game Boy Color developed by Sandbox Studios and published by THQ. The game is a Mattel-licensed title for the Matchbox series of toy cars, allowing the player to respond to emergencies whilst driving police cars, ambulance trucks and fire engines. Upon release, the game received mixed reviews, with critics finding the game fun but critiquing its gameplay as simplistic and repetitive.

== Gameplay ==
Gameplay screenshot of the Game Boy Color version

Players command emergency services and are required to dispatch police cars, ambulance trucks and fire engines to respond to emergencies or disasters across the city. Players drive freely across city streets, and are given a limited amount of time to receive a mission, and dispatch the relevant vehicle to the site of the emergency. A directional arrow and map guides players towards the mission objective. Missions include firefighting, requiring players to aim a firetruck in the direction of burning buildings whilst shooting water from a firehose, or police pursuit missions, chasing a getaway car and ramming it until it stops. The PC version features 27 separate missions. The Game Boy Color version features a sequence of missions, increasing in difficulty and earning the player ranks from 'rookie' to 'chief' when completed.

== Reception ==
Reception

Review scores
Publication	Score	
Publication	GBC	PC
AllGame	3/5	2.5/5
Game Boy Xtreme	75%	
MANiAC	3/5	
PC Action		12%
Total Game Boy	79%	

Matchbox Emergency Patrol received mixed reviews, with several critics describing the game as fun to play but simplistic. Total Game Boy felt the game's racing mechanics contained "plenty of fun" and was "intricately designed", but considered the game's controls were "frustrating" had an "aimless and repetitive" structure that lacked achievement or extras. Jennifer Beam found the game's animations surprisingly detailed, but felt the missions were repetitive, time consuming and had limited variation, as firefighter and police officer modes had fundamentally the same. John Hagerty of Game Boy Xtreme considered the game fun to play but stated the gameplay was simple and lacking challenge, also finding the roads were difficult to see. PC Action critiqued the game's "bad" graphics, "terrible" controls, and "annoying" sound.
