= Iwao Takamoto =

American animator and director (1925–2007)

- 高本 厳夫
- Takamoto in 2005
- Born: April 29, 1925; Los Angeles, California, U.S.
- Died: January 8, 2007 (aged 81); Los Angeles, California, U.S.
- Resting place: Mount Sinai Memorial Park Cemetery
- Occupations: Animator, television producer, film director, storyboard artist, writer
- Employers: Walt Disney Productions (1945–1961); Hanna-Barbera Cartoons (1961–1996); Warner Bros. Animation (1996–2007)
- Spouses: Jane M. Shattuck (m. 1957; div. 1959) Barbara Farber (m. 1964)
- Children: 1

Iwao Takamoto (Japanese: 高本 厳夫, Hepburn: Takamoto Iwao; April 29, 1925 – January 8, 2007) was an American animator, character designer, television producer, and film director. After his family had been sent to the California internment camps in the early 1940s, Takamoto learned to draw, presented his sketchbook to Walt Disney Productions and was hired on the spot.

Noted for his career as a production and character designer for Disney, on films including Cinderella (1950), Lady and the Tramp (1955), and Sleeping Beauty (1959), Takamoto subsequently moved to Hanna-Barbera Productions, where he designed a great majority of the characters, notably the characters Scooby-Doo and Astro. He eventually became a director and producer.

== Early life and career ==
Takamoto was born in Los Angeles, California. His father emigrated from Hiroshima to the United States for his health, and returned to Japan only once, to marry his wife. At 15 years of age, Takamoto graduated from Thomas Jefferson High School in Los Angeles.

After the bombing of Pearl Harbor and signing of Executive Order 9066, Takamoto's family, like many Japanese-Americans, was forced to move to the Manzanar internment camp in the early 1940s. They spent the rest of World War II there, and it was at the camp that Takamoto received basic illustration training from two co-internees who were former Hollywood art directors.

To get a break from camp life Takamoto became a laborer, picking fruit in Idaho.

Takamoto entered the cartoon world after the end of the war. Without the benefit of a formal portfolio of his work, he created a sketchbook of, by his own admission, "everything I saw." It was based on this sketchbook that he applied to work at the Disney studios.

He was hired as an assistant animator by Walt Disney Productions in 1945. Takamoto eventually became an assistant to Milt Kahl. He worked as an animator and character designer on such titles as Cinderella (1950), Peter Pan (1953), Lady and the Tramp (1955), Sleeping Beauty (1959), and One Hundred and One Dalmatians (1961).

== Hanna-Barbera ==
Takamoto left Disney in 1961 and joined Hanna-Barbera Productions. He worked in several positions there, but is arguably best known as a character designer. He was responsible for the original character design of such characters as Scooby-Doo, The Jetsons' dog Astro, and Penelope Pitstop. He worked as a producer at Hanna-Barbera, supervising shows such as The Addams Family, Hong Kong Phooey, and Jabberjaw. He directed his first and only feature-length animated film with Charlotte's Web (1973). He also was involved in production of Hanna-Barbera's Jetsons: The Movie (1990) as supervising director. The inspiration for Scooby-Doo's creation as a Great Dane came from an employee of the Hanna-Barbera company, who bred this dog.

Takamoto was Vice-President of Creative Design at Hanna-Barbera and was responsible for overseeing Hanna-Barbera's many merchandising lines as well as design work for their Animation Art Dept. In 1996, he received the Winsor McCay Award for lifetime achievement and contributions in the animation field. In 2005, he received the Golden Award from the Animation Guild, to honor his more than 50 years of service in the animation field.

After Time Warner acquired (then owner of Hanna-Barbera Cartoons) Turner Broadcasting System in 1996, Takamoto became Vice President of Special Projects for Warner Bros. Animation.

== Personal life ==
Takamoto married Jane M. Shattuck in 1957. They met at Disney while working on the animated feature Sleeping Beauty (1959). They had one son together, Michael. In 1963, he met Barbara Farber, who was the assistant to the public relations director at Hanna-Barbera, Arnie Carr. Part of her job was studio tours, which was how she and Takamoto met. Takamoto married Barbara in 1964 and remained married to her for 44 years, until his death in 2007. Barbara had a daughter from a former marriage, Leslie.

== Death ==
Takamoto died on January 8, 2007, at Cedars-Sinai Medical Center in Los Angeles from a heart attack at the age of 81. Throughout the week following his death, Adult Swim put up a bumper reading "Iwao Takamoto [1925–2007]". He is buried at Mount Sinai Memorial Park Cemetery in Los Angeles in Gardens of Blessing, Section 3, Lot 1390, Space 3. There was a memorial added to the end of the Scooby-Doo direct-to-video film Chill Out, Scooby-Doo! (2007).

== Awards and legacy ==
Takamoto received the Winsor McCay Award, the lifetime achievement award from the International Animated Film Association (ASIFA) Hollywood. He received an honorary citation from the Japanese American National Museum. In 2005, he was given a golden award from the Animation Guild.

Takamoto's memoirs were published posthumously in 2009 by University Press of Mississippi as Iwao Takamoto: My Life with a Thousand Characters by Iwao Takamoto and Michael Mallory. An intimate memoir, Living With A Legend, was published posthumously in 2012 by TotalRecall Press by his stepdaughter, Leslie E. Stern.

== See also ==
- William Hanna
- Joseph Barbera
