= 6th Critics' Choice Awards =

2001 US film awards

- Date: January 22, 2001
- Official website: www.criticschoice.com

Highlights
- Best Film: Gladiator

The 6th Critics' Choice Awards were presented on January 22, 2001, honoring the finest achievements of 2000 filmmaking.

== Top 11 films ==
(in alphabetical order)

- Almost Famous
- Billy Elliot
- Cast Away
- Crouching Tiger, Hidden Dragon (Wo hu cang long)
- Erin Brockovich
- Gladiator
- Quills
- Thirteen Days
- Traffic
- Wonder Boys
- You Can Count on Me

== Winners ==
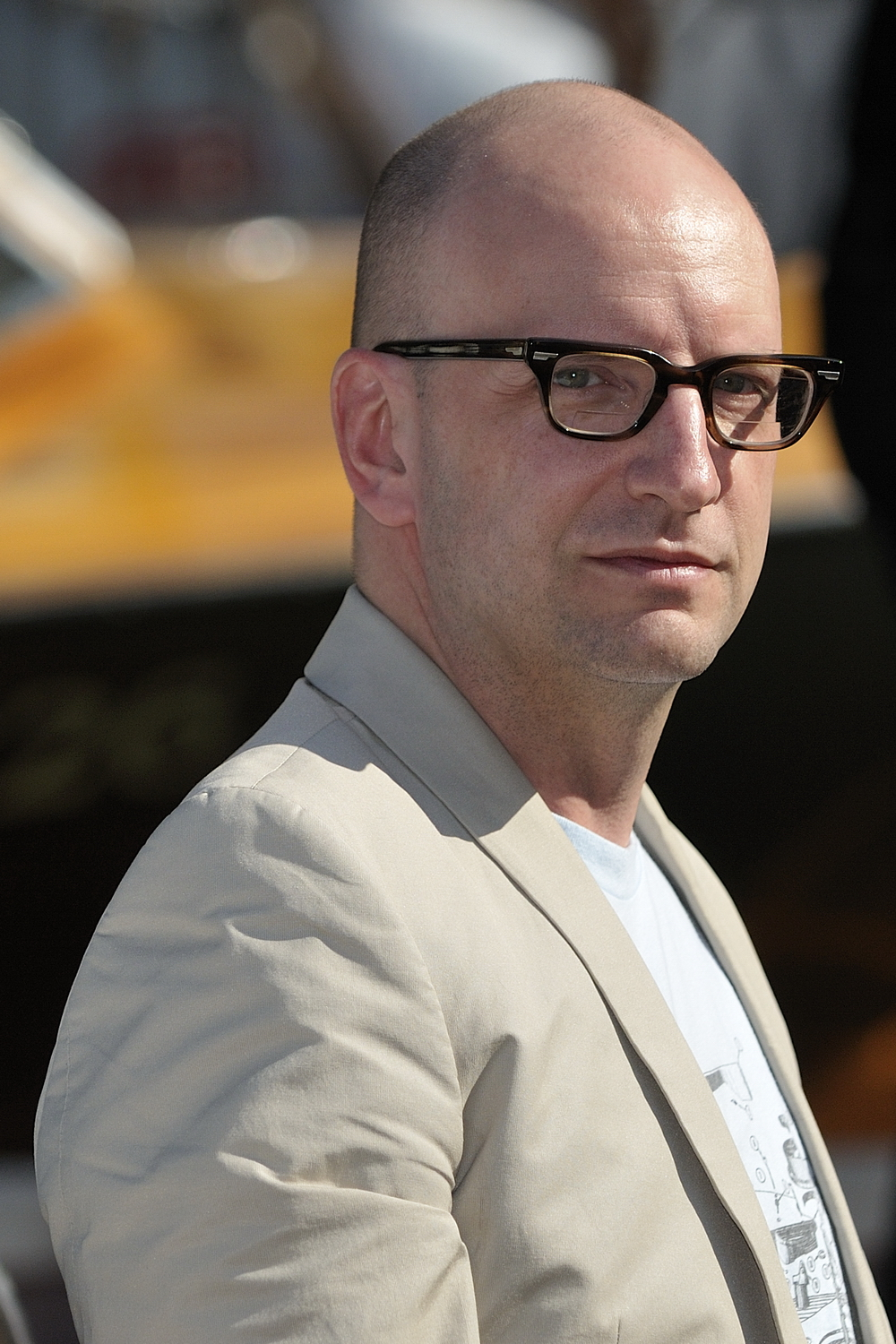
Steven Soderbergh, Best Director winner

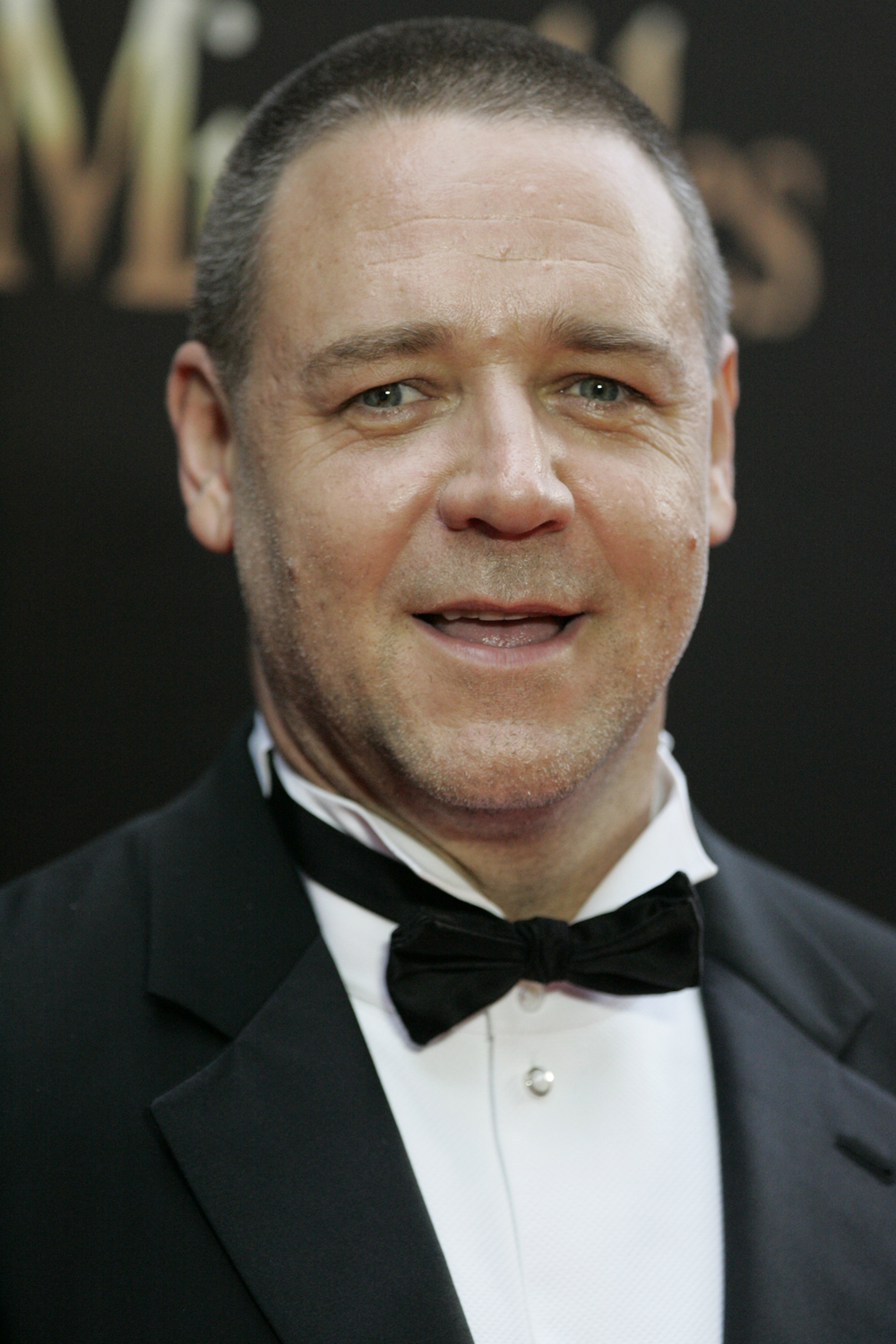
Russell Crowe, Best Actor winner

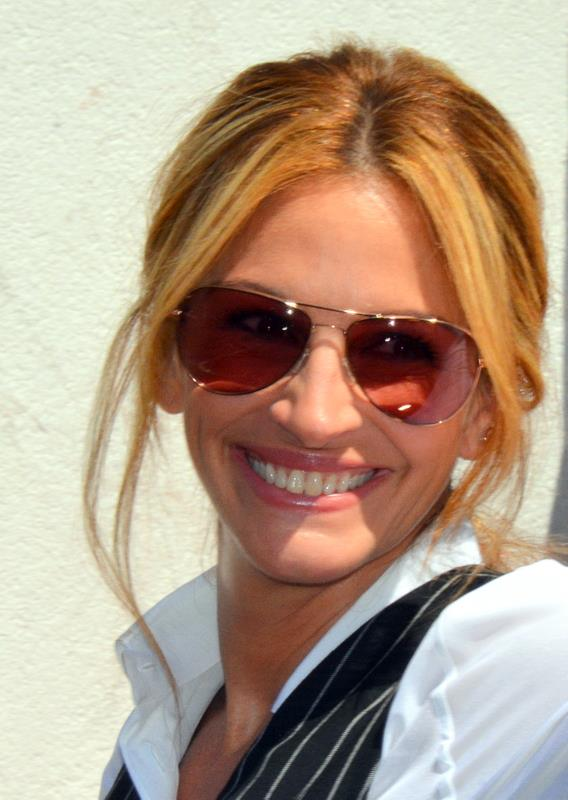
Julia Roberts, Best Actress winner

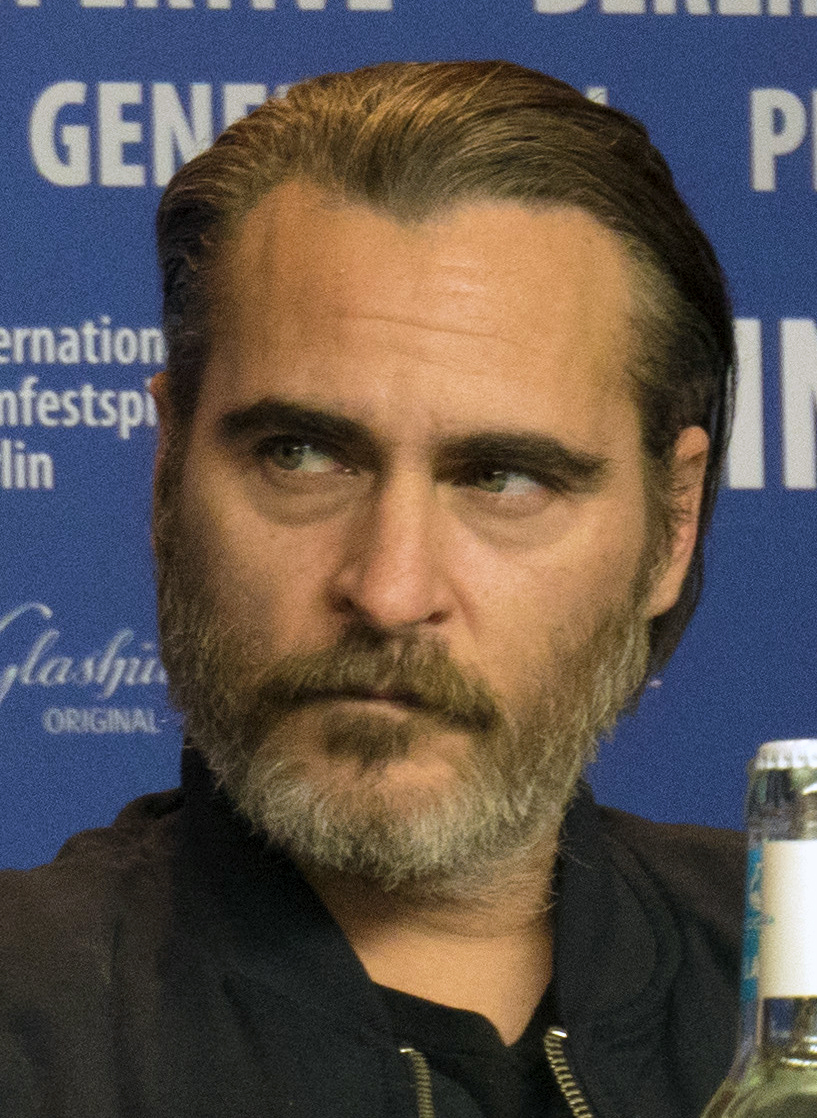
Joaquin Phoenix, Best Supporting Actor winner

Frances McDormand, Best Supporting Actress winner

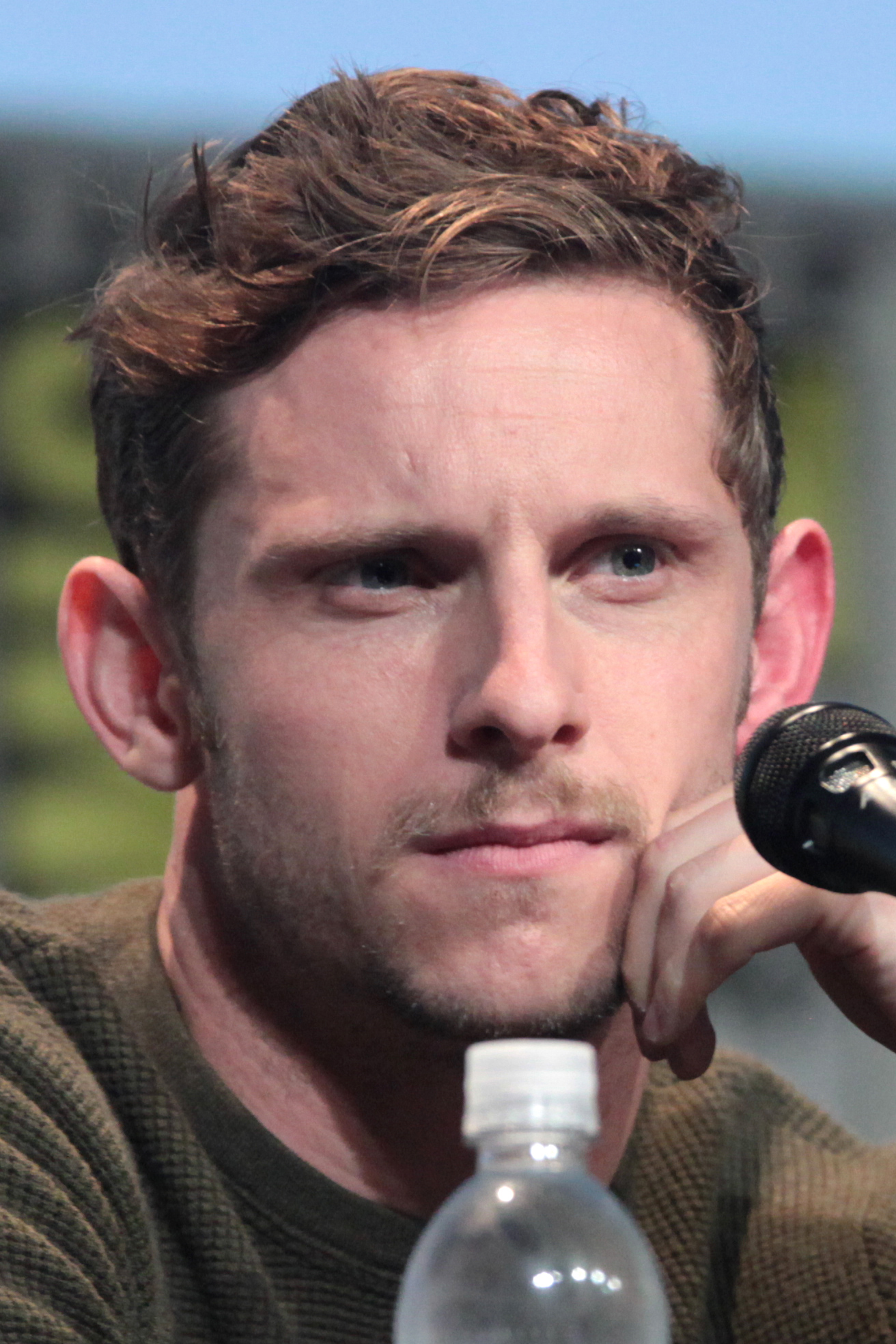
Jamie Bell, Best Child Performance winner

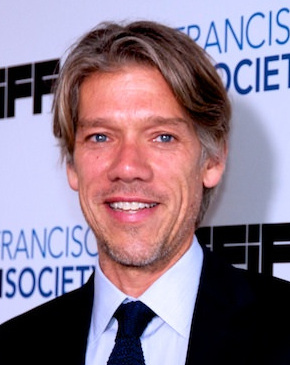
Stephen Gaghan, Best Adapted Screenplay winner

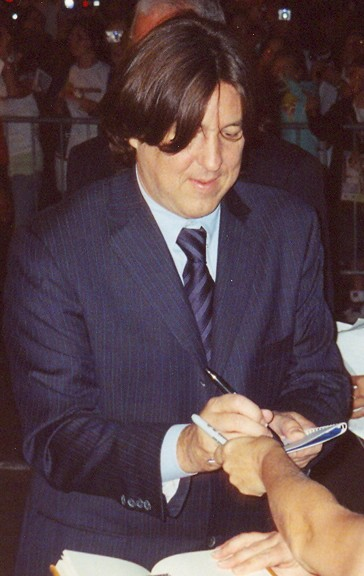
Cameron Crowe, Best Original Screenplay winner

- Best Actor:
  - Russell Crowe – Gladiator
- Best Actress:
  - Julia Roberts – Erin Brockovich
- Best Animated Feature:
  - Chicken Run
- Best Child Performance:
  - Jamie Bell – Billy Elliot
- Best Composer:
  - Hans Zimmer – Gladiator and The Road to El Dorado
- Best Director:
  - Steven Soderbergh – Erin Brockovich and Traffic
- Best Family Film:
  - My Dog Skip
- Best Foreign Language Film:
  - Crouching Tiger, Hidden Dragon (Wo hu cang long) • China / Hong Kong
- Best Picture:
  - Gladiator
- Best Screenplay – Adapted:
  - Traffic – Stephen Gaghan
- Best Screenplay – Original:
  - Almost Famous – Cameron Crowe
- Best Song:
  - "My Funny Friend and Me" performed by Sting – The Emperor's New Groove
- Best Supporting Actor:
  - Joaquin Phoenix – Gladiator and Quills
- Best Supporting Actress:
  - Frances McDormand – Almost Famous and Wonder Boys
- Best Inanimate Object:
  - Wilson the Volleyball – Cast Away
