= Diva Starz =

Series of fashion dolls created and released by Mattel

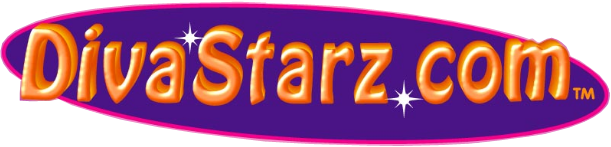
- Type: Doll
- Invented by: Bob Jeffway Jr.
- Company: Mattel
- Country: United States
- Availability: 2000–2004
- Slogan: We know what's up! (2000-2002); We know what's stylin'! (2002-2004)

Diva Starz was a series of talking animatronic fashion dolls created and released by Mattel in October 2000. They are similar in design to MGA's Bratz and Tiger Electronics' Furby. Alexa, Nikki, Summer—later replaced by Miranda—and Tia were offered in the original debut. Originally produced as robotic dolls, Mattel would also release miniature and fashion doll versions in response to their initial success. The line was discontinued in 2004.

== History ==
Invented by toy designer Robert "Bob" Jeffway Jr. and launched by Mattel in October 2000, Diva Starz were released in response to the virtual pet craze, which peaked in the late 1990s thanks to successful interactive toys such as Furby and Tamagotchi. The brand initially featured four characters: Alexa, Nikki, Summer, and Tia, who each had diverse ethnicities and personalities. Each doll stood at approximately 9 inches (23 cm) tall and came with plastic clothes and accessories, which were interactive. The owner could change the doll's outfits by snapping on different pieces of clothing. By using small metal sensors in the clothing and on the body, the doll "knows" which outfit it is wearing and will respond accordingly. Alexa, for example, replies with statements like "You have a great sense of style. I love my pink evening gown. Do you think it makes my eyes look bluer?". This is also the case with the doll's accessories, which usually include items such as a cell phone, CD player, laptop, diary, and pet. These also utilized small metal sensors and were meant to be placed on the doll's hand. Along with this, the dolls also used an infrared (IR) sensor, which was implemented in the dolls' shoes so that they could communicate with each other and carry on conversations. Each doll took 4 AA alkaline batteries.

The dolls would end up becoming a big hit for the company and were popular amongst tween girls, between the ages of 6 and 11, even being named "the product of the year for girls". Despite this, they did generate some criticism, particularly from parents. Some were concerned that the dolls' stylized proportions could inspire future cases of anorexia, while others took issue with the marketing, labeling it "tacky" and "stereotypical". Regardless, the dolls were successful enough to be distributed in other markets, such as Europe, and South America.

After the huge success of the original dolls, Mattel released miniature versions of the dolls called "Mini Diva Starz" in 2001. These dolls stood under 6 inches (15 cm) tall and lacked most interactive features seen in the main dolls. They would talk when a button was pressed on the top of their heads and would say about 4 different pre-recorded phrases. They had non-removable clothes and were poseable. They also came with hair accessories made out of real fabric, such as hats and headbands. Accessories for these dolls would usually include hair clips, sunglasses, and a purse. These dolls took 3 LR44 button-cell alkaline batteries. Mattel would also release the second wave of main Diva Starz dolls in 2001, along with plush versions of the dolls and their pets.

Beginning in 2002, the dolls' popularity would start to decline, largely due to the success of Mattel's rival, MGA Entertainment's Bratz dolls, which were released in May 2001. In response to this, Mattel launched "Fashion Diva Starz" that fall. While generally identical to the original line, these dolls had clothing made of fabric, were taller, standing at about 12 inches (30 cm) tall, and had more accurate proportions. Similar to the Mini Diva Starz, these dolls would talk when a button was pressed on top of their heads. Summer was removed from the lineup and replaced by a new character named Miranda, who made her debut in the second wave of Mini Diva Starz.

The "Fashion Diva Starz" dolls failed to find the same commercial success the original dolls had, and only three waves were ever produced. The line in general would end up being discontinued by Mattel in 2004, due to its decrease in popularity and failure to compete with other fashion dolls on the market at the time. Mattel went on to improve the Barbie line and create My Scene and Flavas dolls as attempts to compete with Bratz.

== Characters ==
Alexa (Alexia in Latin America) is an all-out fashionista and natural leader with fair skin, blonde hair, and blue eyes. She also identified herself as "your personal expert on style". She also kept a diary, where she stored her deepest and darkest secrets. Her representation color was pink, which was also her favorite color. She had a pet cat named Fluffy. Alexa is voiced by Debi Derryberry.

Nikki (Paige or Flo in parts of Europe) is a Latina, with tanned skin, brown hair, and light violet eyes. She's an athletic yet optimistic girl "who'd enjoy skateboarding and many other sports." Besides the skateboard she kept, she also owned other sports gear and merchandise. Her representation color was purple, which was also her favorite color. She had a pet dog named Budster (nicknamed "Buddy"). Nikki is voiced by Joanna Rubiner.

Summer (Rosy in Latin America) is a model citizen with pale skin, red hair, and green eyes who "loved the outdoors so much that she'd bring it inside." She was an animal lover and a compassionate environmentalist. She owned many pets, including a pet rabbit named Sunny. Her representation color was green, which was also her favorite color. She was dropped from the line in 2002 and was eventually replaced by Miranda. Summer is voiced by Amber Hood.

Tia is a "hip-cool chick and a techno whiz" with dark skin, dark brown hair, and brown eyes. She was intelligent and inventive and enjoyed making music. She also loved electronics, such as radios, CD players, and digital planners. Her representation color was blue, which was also her favorite color. She had a pet dog named Hippy (short for "Hipster"). Tia was voiced by MC Lyte (2000-02) and later, by Cree Summer (2003).

Miranda is a properly rich girl with pale skin, platinum blonde hair with pink highlights, and green eyes who "loves all her new friends." She is artistic and humorous, with dreams of becoming a pop star. She had also published a fashion magazine. She was introduced in the 2nd wave of "Mini Diva Starz" in 2002, where she ultimately took Summer's place. Her representation color was undefined, but the website showed a green star with her name on it. She is the only character who does not own a pet. Miranda is voiced by Tara Strong.

== Product list ==
=== Original Dolls ===
2000

- "Wave 1": Alexa, Nikki, Summer and Tia.

2001

- "Wave 2": Alexa, Nikki, Summer and Tia.

=== Mini Diva Starz ===
2001

- "Mini Diva Starz" (1st Edition): Alexa, Nikki, Summer and Tia.

2002

- "Mini Diva Starz" (2nd Edition): Alexa, Nikki, Tia and Miranda (first appearance).
- "Mini Diva Starz" (3rd Edition, Target Exclusive): Alexa, Nikki and Summer (last appearance).

=== Fashion Diva Starz ===
2002

- "Fashion Diva Starz" (1st Edition): Alexa, Nikki, Tia and Miranda.
- "Fashion Glow": Alexa, Nikki, Tia and Miranda.

2003

- "Glitter 2 Glam": Alexa, Nikki, Tia and Miranda.

=== Plush Dolls ===
2001

- "Wave 1": Alexa, Nikki, Summer and Tia.
- "Wave 2": Alexa, Nikki and Summer.

=== Diva Petz ===
2001

- "Diva Petz": Fluffy Starz, Budster Starz, Sunny Starz and Hippy Starz
- "Interactive Diva Petz": Fluffy Starz and Budster Starz.

=== Fashionz ===
2000

- "Fashionz" (1st Edition): Alexa, Nikki, Summer and Tia.

2001

- "Fashionz" (2nd Edition): Alexa, Nikki, Summer and Tia.

2002

- "Fashion Diva Starz Fashionz": 56733, 56734, 56735 and 56736.
- "Fashion Glow Fashionz": B1341, B1342, B1343 and B1344.

2003

- "Glitter 2 Glam Fashionz": B3015 and B3016.

=== Playsets ===
2001

- "Mini Diva Starz (1st Edition)":
  - "Scooter-iffic" (Pink)
  - "Scooter-iffic" (Purple)
  - "Scooter-iffic" (Green)

2002

- "Mini Diva Starz (2nd Edition)":
  - "Diva Cruiser"

=== Keychains ===
2002

- "Keychains": Alexa, Nikki, Summer and Tia.

== Media franchise ==
=== Web series ===
==== "Diva Starz webisodes" (2000-2002) ====
Diva Starz was a Flash animated web series that ran from 2000 to 2002. It was hosted on the official Diva Starz website and remained there until the website's closure in 2005. The webisodes were unique at the time, as each episode contained a mini-game that went along with that episode's plot. Some episodes also contained alternate endings, depending on how well the player performed in the mini-game.

There were 14 episodes published on the official website. The last 3 episodes did not feature Summer, as she was removed from the line in favor of Miranda. Due to the lack of preservation on Mattel's part, some of the episodes have become lost to time as of 2023, but most of them have been archived on websites and projects such as the Internet Archive and Flashpoint Archive. The following is the list of episodes in published order (according to timeline):

No.	Title	Notes
1	"Meet Us at the Mall!"	
2	"Dress 'Em and Do the Walk!"	
3	"Diva Starz Rock The House!"	
4	"Diva Galleria Shopping Spree!"	*Lost*
5	"The Show Must Go On!"	*Lost*
6	"Scoot for the Starz!"	*Lost*
7	"The Big Dance!"	*Lost*
8	"Cats, Dogs and Bunnies!"	*Lost*
9	"The Diva Starz Hit the Slopes!"	
10	"Hollywood, Diva Style!"	
11	"Adventures in Tikki Land!"	Final episode to feature Summer
12	"Pop Star Dreams!"	First episode to feature Miranda
13	"Fashionland Fun!"	
14	"Fashion Emergency!"	

=== Video games ===
2000

- "Diva Starz" (PC)

2001

- "Diva Starz: Mall Mania" (GBC)

=== Website ===
The official Diva Starz website launched in 2000 and was created entirely in Adobe Flash. It featured the main characters' bedrooms and also included games, webisodes, product info, and quizzes. It was included in the line-up of Mattel's EverythingGirl.com portal site. It was shut down in 2005.
