= Diva Starz: Mall Mania =

2001 video game

- Developer: Digital Illusions Canada
- Publisher: Vivendi Universal Interactive Publishing
- Platform: Game Boy Color
- Release: NA: November 1, 2001; EU: 2002
- Genre: Action
- Mode: Single player

Diva Starz: Mall Mania (released as Diva Starz in Europe) is an action video game developed by Digital Illusions Canada and published by Vivendi Universal Interactive Publishing for the Game Boy Color. It was released in North America on November 1, 2001, Europe in 2002, and is based on Mattel's Diva Starz dolls.

The game follows four playable dolls from the Diva Starz line as they play through six different stages. As the player completes each stage with one doll, it subsequently gets harder through subsequent levels. The game received negative reviews from critics.

== Gameplay ==
One of the dolls during the first scooter level

Diva Starz: Mall Mania is an action game, where the player starts by choosing one of four playable dolls from Mattel Inc.'s Diva Starz doll line. After selecting a character, the doll is placed in a scooter level, where they are required to jump and collect items while riding their scooter down a street. Completing the scooter level allows the player to choose from five mall-related levels: the music spot, the pet shop, the fashion spot, the snack spot, and the style spot.

The music level plays similar to the Dance Dance Revolution series, requiring the player to input button pushes at the proper times with the music as prompted by the game. The pet shop level makes the player go through a simple maze to find their puppy at the end of it. The fashion spot requires the player to place colored items into matching colored purses which move on a conveyor belt. The snack spot is a puzzle which lets the player make food by placing pieces in the correct order, and the style spot is a dress up game which makes the player pick outfits which look the best on the characters.

== Reception ==
Diva Starz: Mall Mania received mostly negative reception from critics, who felt that the game was overly easy; it received a 40% from GameRankings. GameZone felt that the game had too little content to warrant a purchase despite its lower price point; the reviewer gave the game to her 11-year-old granddaughter, who beat the entire game in 42 minutes. IGN's Tiffany Timbletank wrote her review in a parody style of the slang language used throughout the game, and stated regarding the length of the game, "The game levels are so short and seem designed with such little effort that I was kind of offended. This just isn't a game."
