= Jane Baer =

American animator (1934–2026)

- Born: Jane Maureen Shattuck; October 30, 1934; Winnipeg, Manitoba, Canada
- Died: February 16, 2026 (aged 91); Van Nuys, California, U.S.
- Occupation: Animator
- Years active: 1950s–1997
- Spouses: Iwao Takamoto (m. 1957; div. 1959); Dale Baer (divorced)

Jane Maureen Shattuck Takamoto Baer (/bɛər/ BAIR; née Shattuck; October 30, 1934 – February 16, 2026) was a Canadian-American animator. She worked on numerous films, including The Fox and the Hound (1981), Mickey's Christmas Carol (1983), The Black Cauldron (1985), Who Framed Roger Rabbit (1988), and Rover Dangerfield (1991). She was a member of the Animation Guild, the Academy of Motion Picture Arts and Sciences, and the Academy of Television Arts & Sciences. She was also a founding member of Women in Animation and was part of its advisory board.

Baer was born in Winnipeg, Manitoba, on October 30, 1934. She died in Van Nuys, California on February 16, 2026, at the age of 91.
