= ESPN National Hockey Night (2001 video game) =

2001 sports video game

- North American PS2 cover art
- Developers: Konami Computer Entertainment Osaka (PS2); Sandbox Studios (GBC)
- Publisher: Konami
- Director: Tsutomu Ogura
- Producer: Tadahiro Kaneko
- Programmer: Kouichi Takagami
- Platforms: PlayStation 2, Game Boy Color
- Release: PlayStation 2: JP: March 8, 2001; NA: March 25, 2001; EU: June 29, 2001; Game Boy Color: NA: March 21, 2001
- Genre: Sports
- Modes: Single-player, multiplayer

ESPN National Hockey Night is a video game developed and published by Konami for PlayStation 2 and Game Boy Color in 2001.

== Reception ==
Reception

Aggregate score
Aggregator	Score
Metacritic	44/100

Review scores
Publication	Score
Consoles +	85%
Electronic Gaming Monthly	2.83/10 (Note: Three critics of Electronic Gaming Monthly gave the game each a score of 3/10, 4/10, and 1.5/10.)
Famitsu	29/40
Game Informer	6.25/10
GameSpot	3.8/10
GameSpy	67%
IGN	3/10
Next Generation	2/5
Official U.S. PlayStation Magazine	1.5/5
PlayStation: The Official Magazine	4/10

The PS2 version received "generally unfavorable reviews" according to the review aggregation website Metacritic. Dan Egger of NextGen said that the game "isn't irredeemable; it's certainly better than FaceOff, but it's just nowhere near as good as EA Sports' NHL Hockey either." In Japan, Famitsu gave it a score of 29 out of 40.
