= Digital Illusions Canada =

Canadian video game developer

CE Digital Illusions Canada Inc.
- Formerly: Sandbox Studios (1999–2001)
- Type: Subsidiary
- Industry: Video games
- Founded: January 1999; 27 years ago
- Founder: Steve Bergenholtz
- Defunct: 5 October 2006; 20 years ago
- Headquarters: Ontario, Canada
- Owner: Digital Illusions CE (2001–2006)
- Number of employees: 25 (2006)

CE Digital Illusions Canada Inc. (trade name Digital Illusions Canada or DICE Canada) was a Canadian game developer and a subsidiary of Digital Illusions CE.

== History ==
The company was formed in January 1999 by Steve Bergenholtz, the co-founder of Utopia Technologies. In November 1999, they opened up a development studio in London, Ontario.

In April 2000, the company opened up a partnership program for independent developers.

In April 2001, Digital Illusions CE announced that they had acquired and merged the assets of Sandbox Studios into a newly formed subsidiary, Digital Illusions North America. The newly-formed division allowed DICE to form its own development, production and sales in the North American market, and added 50 employees to DICE's staff amounting to 150 total employees. Later on, Fredrik Liljegren, who co-founded the original parent company, would join DICE Canada as its studio manager.

Under its new name, DICE Canada continued its focus on the family-friendly market. In May 2001, Digital Illusions signed a publishing deal with Knowledge Adventure and its parent company Vivendi Universal Interactive Publishing to develop games based on popular children's toy properties. A similar deal was made with TDK Mediactive in December 2002 for a game based on The Land Before Time franchise.

By 2005, the studio was restructured to work on expansion packs and spin-offs of existing DICE properties.

In March 2006, Electronic Arts announced that they would acquire all outstanding shares in DICE. After the acquisition was completed, EA announced on 5 October that they would close Digital Illusions Canada with its remaining employees transferring to DICE's main offices in Stockholm, EA Canada or other EA studios. Other employees, including DICE co-founder Fredrik Liljegren, opened up a successor studio named RedJade on 16 October, using the name of a company Liljegren used when he previously left DICE.

== Games developed ==
Year	Title	Platform(s)
1999	Lawyer Hunt	Microsoft Windows
2000	Wham-o Frisbee Golf	Microsoft Windows
2000	Dinosaur	PlayStation
2000	The Emperor's New Groove	Game Boy Color
2000	Hoyle Card Games	Game Boy Color
2001	Blast Lacrosse	PlayStation
2001	Matchbox: Emergency Patrol	Microsoft Windows
2001	ESPN National Hockey Night	Game Boy Color
2001	JumpStart Dino Adventure Field Trip	Game Boy Color
2001	JumpStart Wildlife Safari Field Trip	PlayStation
2001	Diva Starz: Mall Mania	Game Boy Color
2001	Shrek	Xbox
2002	Shrek Extra Large	GameCube
2002	The Land Before Time: Big Water Adventure	PlayStation
2002	Secret Agent Barbie: Royal Jewel Mission	Game Boy Advance
2002	Barbie: Groovy Games	Game Boy Advance
2002	Pryzm: Chapter One - The Dark Unicorn	PlayStation 2
2003	Barbie: Gotta Have Games	PlayStation
2003	Polly Pocket: Super Splash Island	Game Boy Advance
2004	Battlefield Vietnam	Microsoft Windows
2005	Battlefield 2: Special Forces	Microsoft Windows
2006	Battlefield 2: Euro Force	Microsoft Windows
2006	Battlefield 2: Armored Fury	Microsoft Windows
