= David Reynolds (screenwriter) =

American screenwriter

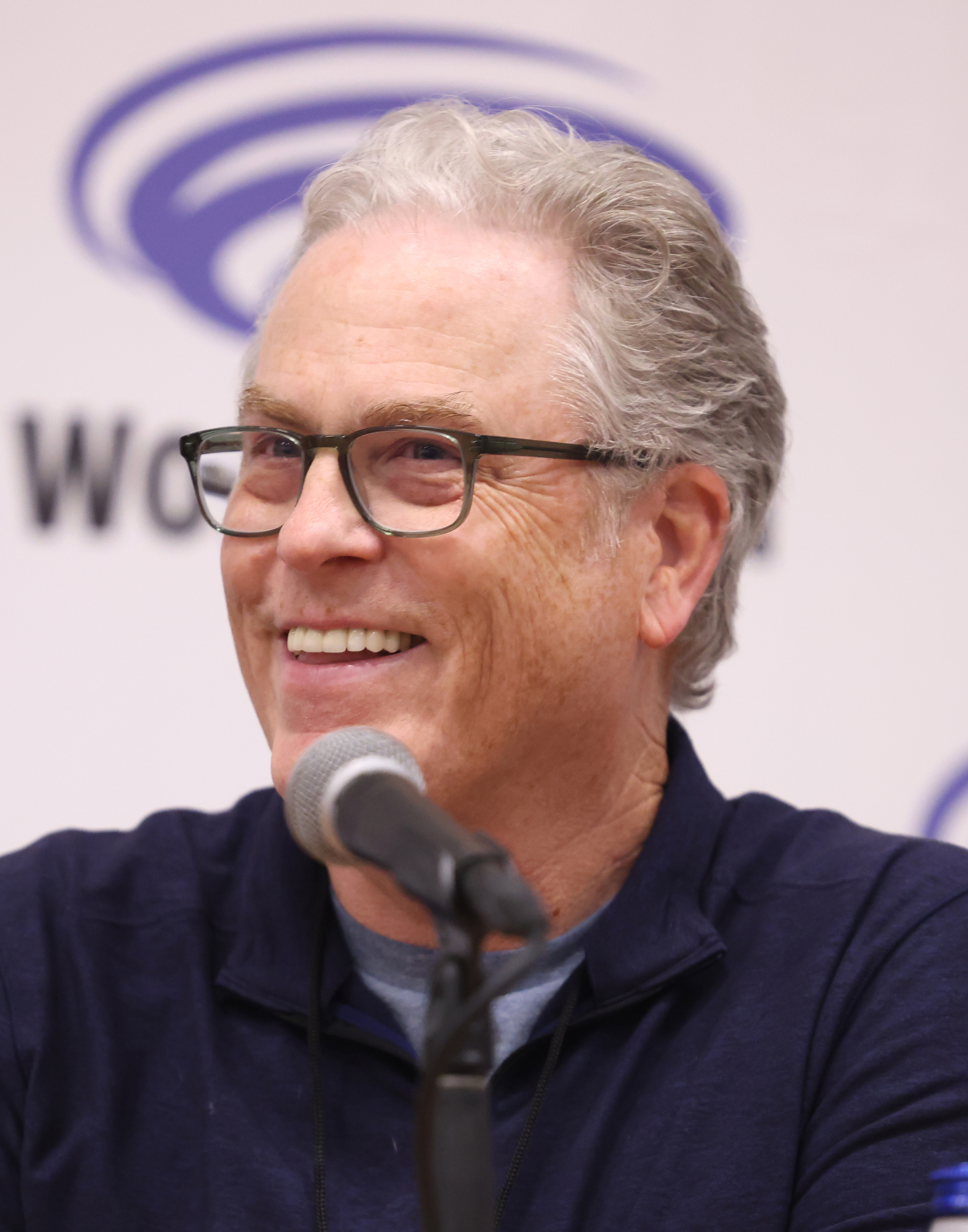
- Reynolds in 2025
- Occupations: Screenwriter; actor; film producer
- Years active: 1986–present
- Agent: The Gersh Agency
- Notable work: The Emperor's New Groove; Finding Nemo; Mulan; Atlantis: The Lost Empire; The Garfield Movie

David Reynolds is an American screenwriter. He is known for having written animated movies such as The Emperor's New Groove (2000), Finding Nemo (2003) and The Garfield Movie (2024).

== Biography ==
In the early 1990s, he became a television writer. He made his writing debut on the late-night television series, Late Night with Conan O'Brien. Afterwards, he started to transition into film with his theatrical debut providing additional story material on Mulan. After the success of Mulan, Disney gave Reynolds a 'six-year contract' deal to work for both Walt Disney Feature Animation and Pixar Animation Studios. Some later works with the "Mouse-House" included additional writing on the story for A Bug's Life, writer of the host segments on Fantasia 2000, and got his official writing debut with The Emperor's New Groove.

He went on to write with other writers on films like on Atlantis: The Lost Empire with Tab Murphy, The Jungle Book 2 with Karl Geurs and Evan Spiliotopoulos, and his most acclaimed work yet, Finding Nemo, with Andrew Stanton and Bob Peterson. He received numerous nominations and awards for Nemo, including an Academy Award nomination for Best Original Screenplay, a BAFTA nomination for Best Original Screenplay, a Hugo Award nomination for Best Dramatic Presentation, Long Form, and a Nebula Award nomination for Best Script, and won an Annie for Writing in a Feature Production. Reynolds was attached to co-write, alongside Ken Kaufman, the 2006 animated film Curious George. His name was featured in the film’s trailer but was left uncredited in the film.

His last movie credit was for working on Chimpanzee where he was a creative consultant and wrote the short film The Polar Bears in 2012. In 2007, Reynolds was slated to write a film adaptation of the book Nightmare Academy. In 2010, it was reported that he was working at Sony Pictures Animation for a feature titled Futuropolis that would've been co-written and directed by Stephan Franck. As of 2018, no updates have emerged for Nightmare Academy and Futuropolis. On June 7, 2015, Reynolds and New Groove director Mark Dindal attended a conversation event for the Austin Film Festival where they shared their knowledge, secrets, and strategies.

In 2021, Reynolds was announced as screenwriter for The Garfield Movie, along with the announcement that Chris Pratt would voice the titular character. Writing alongside Paul A. Kaplan and Mark Torgove, the film reunited Reynolds with New Groove director Mark Dindal. The film was released on May 24, 2024, and while it was met with mixed-to-negative reviews, the film was a box-office hit.

== Filmography ==
Title	Year	Role
One More Saturday Night	1986	Actor: Russ Cadwell
Crime Story	1986	Actor: Driver #2 ("The War")
Soul Man	1986	Actor: Ernie
China Beach	1988	Actor: Pilot #1 ("Somewhere Over the Radio")
Raising Miranda	1988	Unknown ("Black Monday")
Late Night with Conan O'Brien	1993-94	Writer (230 episodes)
Dumb and Dumber: The Animated Series	1996	Writer: Overbites in Paradise segment
Mulan	1998	Additional story material
A Bug's Life	1998	Additional writer: story
Saturday Night Live	1998	Writer: Alec Baldwin/Luciano Pavarotti, Vanessa Williams (Saturday TV Funhouse segment)
Tarzan	1999	Additional screenplay material
Toy Story 2	1999	Additional screenplay material
Fantasia 2000	1999	Writer: Live-Action segments (along with Don Hahn and Irene Mecchi)
TV Funhouse	2000	Writer: Christmas Day (Globetrotters Christmas segment)
The Emperor's New Groove	2000	Screenplay, voice: Checkers Player
Atlantis: The Lost Empire	2001	Additional screenplay material
The Sweatbox	2002	Himself
The Jungle Book 2	2003	Additional written material
Finding Nemo	2003	Screenplay (along with Andrew Stanton and Bob Peterson)
Finding Nemo: Studio Tour of Pixar	2003	Himself
Chicken Little	2005	Additional dialogue
Sita Sings the Blues	2008	Donor
Toy Story 3	2010	Additional dialogue
Chimpanzee	2012	Creative consultant
The Polar Bears	2012	Screenplay
Aldabra: Once Upon an Island	2015	Creative consultant
Sprite Fright	2021	Short; special thanks
The Garfield Movie	2024	Screenplay (along with Paul A. Kaplan and Mark Torgove), executive producer, lyricist for Lactose Farms Jingle (with Mark Dindal)

=== Unrealized projects ===
- Nightmare Academy
- Futuropolis
- Brooklyn Family Robinson
- Where's Charlie?

== Awards and nominations ==
List of awards and nominations
Year	Award	Category	Film(s)	Result	Notes
2001	Annie Award	Individual Achievement in Writing	The Emperor's New Groove	Nominated	
2003	Discover Screenwriting Award		Finding Nemo	Nominated	
2003	Washington DC Area Film Critics Association Awards	Best Original Screenplay	Finding Nemo	Nominated	
2003	Utah Film Critics Association Awards	Best Writing, Screenplay - Original/Adapted	Finding Nemo	Nominated	
2003	Seattle Film Critics Awards	Best Screenplay, Original	Finding Nemo	Nominated	
2004	Nebula Award	Best Script	Finding Nemo	Nominated	
2004	Online Film & Television Association Film Award	Best Writing, Screenplay Written Directly for the Screen	Finding Nemo	Nominated	
2004	Hugo Awards	Feature Film Category	Finding Nemo	Nominated	
2004	31st Annie Awards	Outstanding Writing in an Animated Feature Production	Finding Nemo	Won	
2004	57th British Academy Film Awards	Best Screenplay - Original	Finding Nemo	Nominated	
2004	76th Academy Awards	Best Original Screenplay	Finding Nemo	Nominated	
