= Dale Baer =

American animator (1950–2021)

- Born: Dale L. Baer; June 15, 1950; Denver, Colorado, US
- Died: January 15, 2021 (aged 70); Irvine, California, US
- Occupation: Animator
- Years active: 1970–2021
- Spouse: Jane Shattuck (divorced)
- Awards: Winsor McCay Award, 2016; Annie Award, 2001

Dale L. Baer (/bɛər/ BAIR; June 15, 1950 – January 15, 2021) was an American character animator for Walt Disney Animation Studios and The Baer Animation Company. He was supervising animator of many characters.

== Biography ==
Baer had over 40 years of experience in the animation industry. He also had 27 years in the commercial field. Baer's studio specialized in traditional and digital animation which is used in feature animation and commercials. Baer collaborated with top industries to produce high quality animated productions. He joined The Walt Disney Company in 1970 as the second member of the new training program; Ted Kierscey, who later became an effects animator, got there ahead of him. Mr. Baer earned the respect of animators from the Nine Old Men: Eric Larson, John Lounsbery, Milt Kahl, Wolfgang Reitherman, Frank Thomas and Ollie Johnston.

Baer taught as part of the Character Animation program faculty of CalArts School of Film/Video.

His last-known animation work was for The Bob's Burgers Movie.

Baer died of complications from amyotrophic lateral sclerosis at Irvine Medical Center in Irvine, California.

== Awards ==
Below is a list of awards Baer has won.

- 2001 - Annie Award for Individual Character Animation for the character of Yzma in The Emperor's New Groove.
- 2016 - Winsor McCay Award – in recognition of career contributions to the art of animation.

== Filmography ==
Year	Title	Credits	Characters
1972	Journey Back to Oz	Layout Artist	
1973	Robin Hood	Character Animator	
1974	Winnie the Pooh and Tigger Too (Short)	Animator	
1977	The Many Adventures of Winnie the Pooh	Animator	
1977	The Rescuers	Character Animator	Bernard and Miss Bianca
1978	The Lord of the Rings	Layout Artist / Key Animator	
1980	Bon Voyage, Charlie Brown (and Don't Come Back!!)	Animator	
1983	Mickey's Christmas Carol	Animator	
1985	The Black Cauldron	Animator	
1986	The Great Mouse Detective	Character Animator (Uncredited)	
1988	Who Framed Roger Rabbit	Chief Executive And Supervising Animator: Additional Animation	
1989	Tummy Trouble	Animator	
1990	The Prince and the Pauper	Animation Director/Second Unit Director	
1991	Rover Dangerfield	Supervisor: The Baer Animation Company	
1992	Tom and Jerry: The Movie	Animation Director: The Baer Animation Company	
1993	Last Action Hero	Animation Designer/Animator (uncredited)	
1994	The Lion King	Animator	Adult Simba
1998	Quest for Camelot	Animator	
1999	Tarzan	Additional Animator	
1999	The King and I	Storyboard Artist	
2000	The Emperor's New Groove	Supervising Animator	Yzma
2002	Treasure Planet	Animator	Doctor Doppler
2004	Home on the Range	Supervising Animator	Alameda Slim, Junior
2005	Chicken Little	Animator	
2007	Meet the Robinsons	Supervising Animator	Wilbur Robinson
2009	The Princess and the Frog	Animator	Ray, Frog Hunters
2011	Winnie the Pooh	Supervising Animator	Owl
2011	The Ballad of Nessie	Supervising Animator	
2012	Wreck-It Ralph	Additional Visual Development	
2013	Frozen	Additional Visual Development	
2013	Get a Horse!	Animator	
2016	Zootopia	Additional Visual Development	
2016	Moana	Additional Visual Development	
2017	Tom and Jerry: Willy Wonka and the Chocolate Factory	Character Layout And Animation	
2022	The Bob's Burgers Movie	Animator (Posthumous Release)	
