= My Funny Friend and Me =

2000 single by Sting

Single by Sting

from the album The Emperor's New Groove soundtrack
- Released: 14 November 2000
- Recorded: Summer 2000
- Studio: Westlake (California); Flyte Tyme (Edina, Minnesota)
- Genre: Pop; R&B; blue-eyed soul; gospel
- Length: 4:38 (album version); 4:27 (radio edit)
- Label: Walt Disney; A&M
- Composers: Sting; David Hartley
- Lyricist: Sting
- Producers: Jimmy Jam and Terry Lewis; James "Big Jim" Wright (co-producer)

Sting singles chronology
"After the Rain Has Fallen" (2000)	"My Funny Friend and Me" (2000)	"Fragile (2001)" (2001)

"My Funny Friend and Me" is a song by English musician Sting. It was written by Sting and David Hartley for the Walt Disney Pictures animated film The Emperor's New Groove. When the film began development in 1994 under the title Kingdom of the Sun, Sting was hired to write the film's songs. Released in November 2000, the track reached No. 24 on the American Billboard Adult Contemporary Singles chart, and was nominated for the Academy Award for Best Original Song at the 73rd Academy Awards in 2001.

== Personnel ==
- Produced and arranged by Jimmy Jam and Terry Lewis
- Co-produced by "Big Jim" Wright
- Vocals recorded by Dave Rideau (assisted by Pablo Munguia) at Westlake Audio
- Track and background vocals recorded and mixed by Steve Hodge (assisted by Brad Yost and Xavier Smith) at Flyte Tyme Studios, Edina, MN
- Background vocals: Terry Lewis, Big Jim, Tony Tolbert and James Grear
- Guitar: Dave Barry
- Drum programming: Alex Richbourg
- Additional instruments: Jimmy Jam and Terry Lewis

== Charts ==
Chart (2001)	Peak position
Switzerland (Schweizer Hitparade)	91
US Adult Contemporary (Billboard)	24
