= The Emperor's New Groove (video game) =

2000 video game

- North American PlayStation box art
- Developers: Argonaut Games (PS/PC); Sandbox Studios (GBC)
- Publishers: Sony Computer Entertainment (PS); Disney Interactive (PC); Ubi Soft (GBC)
- Producers: Mark Bevan (PS/PC); Jamie Walker (PS/PC)
- Designer: Stephen Jarrett (PS/PC)
- Programmers: Harrison Bernardez (PS); Jani Peltonen (PC)
- Artists: Stuart Scott (PS/PC); Wayne Billingham (PS/PC)
- Composer: Justin Scharvona (PS/PC)
- Platforms: PlayStation, Microsoft Windows, Game Boy Color
- Release: PlayStation, Windows: NA: November 16, 2000 (PS); NA: November 20, 2000 (PC); EU: February 16, 2001; Game Boy Color: NA: December 14, 2000; EU: March 16, 2001
- Genre: Platform
- Mode: Single-player

The Emperor's New Groove is a 2000 platform game developed by Argonaut Games for the PlayStation and Microsoft Windows. It is based on the 2000 animated film of the same name. An abridged version was developed by Sandbox Studios for the Game Boy Color.

== Gameplay ==
The Emperor's New Groove is a platformer in which the player controls Kuzco from a third-person perspective, progressing through a linear succession of levels based on locations from the movie. The primary goal of the game is to get to the end of each level without losing all health.

Throughout the levels are placed several coins. Collecting all coins in a level rewards the player with a large gold coin and is necessary for 100% completion. To achieve this, the player is usually required to defeat enemies and uncover secrets within each level.

Some levels involve Kuzco drinking magic elixirs, turning him into a frog, a turtle, or a rabbit, each with specific abilities needed to complete the level.

== Plot ==
The PlayStation and PC versions of The Emperor's New Groove loosely follow the plot of the movie, from which they also include several cutscenes at the start or end of certain levels. Emperor Kuzco has been transformed into a llama by his evil advisor Yzma, who has subsequently taken over his throne. Kuzco befriends the peasant Pacha and together they seek to confront Yzma and her henchman Kronk to obtain an elixir that will return Kuzco to his human form. There are some characters that do not appear in the movie, such as an unnamed boy riding a llama-shaped bike who throughout the game challenges Kuzco to a race.

== Development ==
Argonaut Games founder Jez San noted that the game's development team tried to keep the game's plot and setting close to that of the movie while also "exaggerating some elements of the movie that would make great game scenarios", specifically pointing to the scene in the movie with the roller coaster leading to Yzma's laboratory, which played a minor role in the movie but was made into a much larger aspect of the game.

The PlayStation and PC versions of The Emperor's New Groove were developed using the same game engine as Croc 2, following Argonaut's common strategy of reusing game engines and development tools from their previously created games. Argonaut developed The Emperor's New Groove at the same time as Disney's Aladdin in Nasira's Revenge, another 3D platformer also built from the Croc 2 engine. The Emperor's New Groove shares many graphical and gameplay similarities to Nasira's Revenge as a result of this.

Before its release on the PlayStation, Argonaut believed that The Emperor's New Groove had potential to be updated and re-released on upcoming next-generation consoles, but an updated game was never attempted. The PlayStation version's voice acting and subtitles were localized into nine languages for the PAL region. (Note: PlayStation localizations include Danish, Dutch, Finnish, French, German, Italian, Norwegian, Spanish, and Swedish. A Portuguese localization also exists for the PC version.)

== Release ==
Demo versions of The Emperor's New Groove on PlayStation were exhibited at the European Computer Trade Show in September 2000, alongside other upcoming games from Disney Interactive.

A DVD-Rom demo of The Emperor's New Groove was included on the DVD release of the game's respective movie counterpart, accessible by inserting the DVD into a PC.

In 2010, the game was ported to the PlayStation 3 and the PlayStation Portable as a PS one Classic digital download on the PlayStation Store. In 2012, the game was also made downloadable for the PlayStation Vita.

== Reception ==
Reception

Aggregate score
Aggregator	Score		
Aggregator	GBC	PC	PS
Metacritic	N/A	N/A	66/100

Review scores
Publication	Score		
Publication	GBC	PC	PS
AllGame	N/A	N/A	3/5
CNET Gamecenter	N/A	N/A	8/10
Computer Games Strategy Plus	N/A	3.5/5	N/A
Electronic Gaming Monthly	5/10	N/A	7.5/10
Game Informer	N/A	N/A	8.25/10
Gamekult	N/A	5/10	6/10
GameRevolution	N/A	N/A	B−
GameSpot	N/A	N/A	7.5/10
IGN	N/A	N/A	6.5/10
Jeuxvideo.com	12/20	N/A	13/20
Next Generation	N/A	N/A	3/5
Official U.S. PlayStation Magazine	N/A	N/A	3.5/5

The PlayStation version received "average" reviews according to the review aggregation website Metacritic.

Writing for video game news website IGN, Jeremy Conrad compared the gameplay of the game to the games in the Spyro the Dragon trilogy of games, noting the similarities in controls and gameplay style. Conrad stated that the game "doesn't offer anything that we haven't seen before" and criticizing the game's difficulty and short length, while praising the gameplay for its variety and "spot-on" controls and also praising its graphics and music and highlighting the game's self-aware dialogue as an enjoyable aspect.

Reviewer Jon Thompson of AllGame spoke positively of the game, praising it for its graphics, music, and controls while also criticizing the game for its short length. Sam Kennedy of Electronic Gaming Monthly praised the game's presentation, noting that it had "wit and sarcasm" similar to the film it was based on, but was more critical of its gameplay, calling it "a mixed bag" and praising the level variety but criticizing the repetition of certain gameplay elements. Star Dingo of GamePro's website-only review commended the game's self-aware sense of humor and level variety, though they also noted the game's similarities to other 3D platformer games, concluding that "the Emperor may have found himself a brand new groove, but the gameplay sits squarely in the niche formed by a thousand other 3D games...". (Note: GamePro gave the PlayStation version three 3.5/5 scores for graphics, control, and fun factor, and 4/5 for sound.) Frank Provo of GameSpot was critical of the game's sound quality and low difficulty, and particularly criticized the camera as being "jittery and out of control" at times, but ultimately lauded the game's variety and presentation, noting the game's graphics to be "underwhelming from a visual standpoint" at the beginning of the game but becoming more interesting as the game progressed, concluding that the game "does more right than it does wrong" and calling the game "pretty, funny, and pretty funny – the way a Disney game should be". David Chen of NextGen said that it was "neither challenging nor captivating, but a solid game nonetheless".

=== Sales ===
By August 2001, the PlayStation and PC versions of The Emperor's New Groove had together sold 400,000 units, which Argonaut Games deemed as disappointing. As a result, the game did not generate any royalty income for Argonaut during the year following its release.
