= The Real Bears =

The Real Bears is an anti-soft-drink advertising campaign by the Center for Science in the Public Interest, which debuted in October 2012. It is a parody of the Coca-Cola Company's ad campaigns depicting polar bears, in particular the "Open Happiness" ads, and was produced with the help of Alex Bogusky. Michael Jacobson said that the ad was "...our attempt to reposition soft drinks from a source of happiness to a major cause of disease." CSPI chose Bogusky to direct the ad because, they said, they had long admired his work in creating anti-tobacco ads through his agency, Crispin Porter + Bogusky. The song playing throughout the CSPI ad is by Jason Mraz and is entitled "Sugar." The ad depicts polar bears suffering from a wide variety of health problems as a result of soda consumption, such as type II diabetes and erectile dysfunction. In response to the ad, Coca-Cola spokeswoman Susan Stribling stated that the ad was "irresponsible and the usual grandstanding from CSPI,” and Karen Hanretty, a spokeswoman for the American Beverage Association, noted that soda consumption has decreased over the last decade or so, whereas obesity rates have still risen over the same time period, saying, "CSPI is better at producing videos than they are doing math." The video has over 2 million views on YouTube.
