= The Emperor's New Groove =

2000 animated Disney film by Mark Dindal

- Theatrical release poster by John Alvin
- Directed by: Mark Dindal
- Screenplay by: David Reynolds
- Story by: Chris Williams; Mark Dindal; Roger Allers; Matthew Jacobs
- Produced by: Randy Fullmer
- Starring: David Spade; John Goodman; Eartha Kitt; Patrick Warburton; Wendie Malick
- Edited by: Pamela Ziegenhagen-Shefland
- Music by: John Debney
- Production company: Walt Disney Feature Animation
- Distributed by: Buena Vista Pictures Distribution (Note: Distributed under the Walt Disney Pictures banner.)
- Release dates: December 10, 2000 (El Capitan Theatre); December 15, 2000 (United States)
- Running time: 78 minutes
- Country: United States
- Language: English
- Budget: $100 million
- Box office: $169.7 million

The Emperor's New Groove is a 2000 American animated comedy film produced by Walt Disney Feature Animation. It was directed by Mark Dindal and written by David Reynolds, based on a story conceived by Dindal and Chris Williams. The film stars David Spade, John Goodman, Eartha Kitt, Patrick Warburton, and Wendie Malick. Inspired by ancient Peruvian culture and set in an Incan empire, The Emperor's New Groove follows Emperor Kuzco (Spade), who is accidentally transformed into a llama by his treacherous ex-advisor, Yzma (Kitt), and her dimwitted henchman Kronk (Warburton) in a botched attempt to kill him by poisoning his drink. For the emperor to change back into a human, he entrusts a village leader, Pacha (Goodman), to escort him back to the palace before Yzma can track them down and finish him off.

Development of The Emperor's New Groove began in 1994 when the film was conceived as a musical epic titled Kingdom of the Sun. Following his directorial debut with The Lion King (1994), Roger Allers recruited English musician Sting to compose several songs for the film. Because of the underwhelming box-office performances of Pocahontas (1995) and The Hunchback of Notre Dame (1996), Dindal was brought in as co-director to make the film more comedic. Because of poor test screenings, creative differences with Dindal, and production falling behind schedule, Allers departed, and the film became a lighthearted comedy in the vein of a Chuck Jones cartoon instead of a dramatic musical. A documentary, The Sweatbox (2002), details the production troubles that The Emperor's New Groove endured during its six years of development.

The Emperor's New Groove premiered at the El Capitan Theatre in Los Angeles on December 10, 2000, and was released in theaters by Buena Vista Pictures Distribution under the Walt Disney Pictures banner on December 15, 2000. The film received generally positive reviews from critics, but it underperformed at the box office compared to Disney films released in the 1990s, grossing $169.5 million on a $100 million budget. However, the film found larger success when it was released for home media, and became the best-selling home video release by Disney of 2001 in the United States. In the years since its release, The Emperor's New Groove has garnered a cult following among fans. It was nominated for an Academy Award for Best Original Song for the song "My Funny Friend and Me", performed by Sting; that award went to "Things Have Changed" by Bob Dylan from Wonder Boys. It was re-released in theaters in 2021 and grossed an additional $334,000. A direct-to-video spin-off sequel, Kronk's New Groove, was released on December 13, 2005, and an animated television series, The Emperor's New School, aired on the Disney Channel from 2006 to 2008.

== Plot ==
In South America, Incan emperor Kuzco has been spoiled his entire life and has become incredibly conceited. On the day before his 18th birthday, Kuzco announces his plan to demolish a nearby village and have a lavish summer home constructed in its place; village leader Pacha objects but is dismissed. Kuzco also discovers his elderly advisor and alchemist Yzma is usurping his duties, and informs her that she is fired. Yzma and her bumbling sidekick Kronk plot to poison Kuzco's wine and take over the empire before the news of Yzma's termination becomes public. However, Kronk takes the wrong chemical vial from Yzma's secret laboratory, accidentally turning Kuzco into a llama instead of killing him. Yzma orders Kronk to knock Kuzco out, take him outside the city, and kill him. An attack of conscience and a series of mishaps causes Kronk to drop the sack containing the unconscious Kuzco; the sack lands on the back of Pacha's cart, and Pacha leaves the city before Kronk can catch up to him.

Kuzco awakens in Pacha's backyard, having lost some of his memory. Believing Pacha transformed and kidnapped him, Kuzco orders Pacha to take him home. Pacha refuses to help unless Kuzco changes his mind and builds his summer home elsewhere. Kuzco arrogantly rejects Pacha's demand and ventures into the jungle alone, despite Pacha warning him it is unsafe. After Pacha follows him and rescues him from jaguars, Kuzco begrudgingly agrees to relocate the construction site of his summer house if Pacha takes him home. On the way to the palace, Kuzco tries to renege on his promise; he and Pacha fight on a collapsing bridge, before being forced to work together to escape some crocodiles and a crumbling cliff face. Meanwhile, Yzma learns Kronk lost Kuzco and the duo set out to find him.

At a roadside diner, Pacha and Kuzco arrive at the same time as Yzma and Kronk, but neither party initially notices the other. Kronk nearly recognizes Pacha, who overhears Yzma's plans to murder Kuzco. Pacha sneaks Kuzco out of the diner, but Kuzco does not believe Pacha's warnings. Kuzco and Pacha argue and part ways. Kuzco almost approaches Yzma and Kronk, until he overhears them discussing their plot to kill him, and the fact that no one in the kingdom seems to care that he is gone. Realizing he is alone and unwanted, and finally seeing Yzma's true colors, Kuzco flees into the jungle to apologize to Pacha, but cannot find him. As a result, he breaks down into depression over how selfish he had been in the past.

The next morning, a devastated Kuzco resigns himself to living in a herd of llamas; however, Pacha has been waiting there for him, having actually kept his distance, and the two reconcile. Meanwhile, Kronk remembers where he saw Pacha before, and tells Yzma. Kuzco and Pacha return to Pacha's village, only to discover that Yzma and Kronk are in Pacha's house, posing as distant relatives. Pacha's family distracts Yzma to give Pacha and Kuzco a head start; however, Yzma and Kronk still manage to confront the duo in Yzma's lab. Kronk is ordered to kill them, but he has another attack of conscience and hesitates. Yzma harshly insults him, and he attempts to kill her instead, but she drops him through a trapdoor in response.

As Pacha and Kuzco flee from Yzma and her guards, Kuzco tries several different potions, without success. After figuring out which vial is the "human" potion, Kuzco, Pacha, and Yzma fight over it. Yzma is turned into a cat by one of the other potions, and Pacha nearly falls off the side of the palace; this forces Kuzco to rescue Pacha, allowing Yzma to take the vial. With some teamwork and inadvertent assistance from Kronk (who found his way out of the trapdoor), the duo defeat Yzma and recover the vial. After finally becoming human again, Kuzco makes amends with the people he hurt and builds a more modest summer home on the uninhabited hill next to Pacha's. Meanwhile, Kronk goes on to become the leader of a scout troop, with Yzma, still as a cat, being a reluctant member of it.

== Voice cast ==
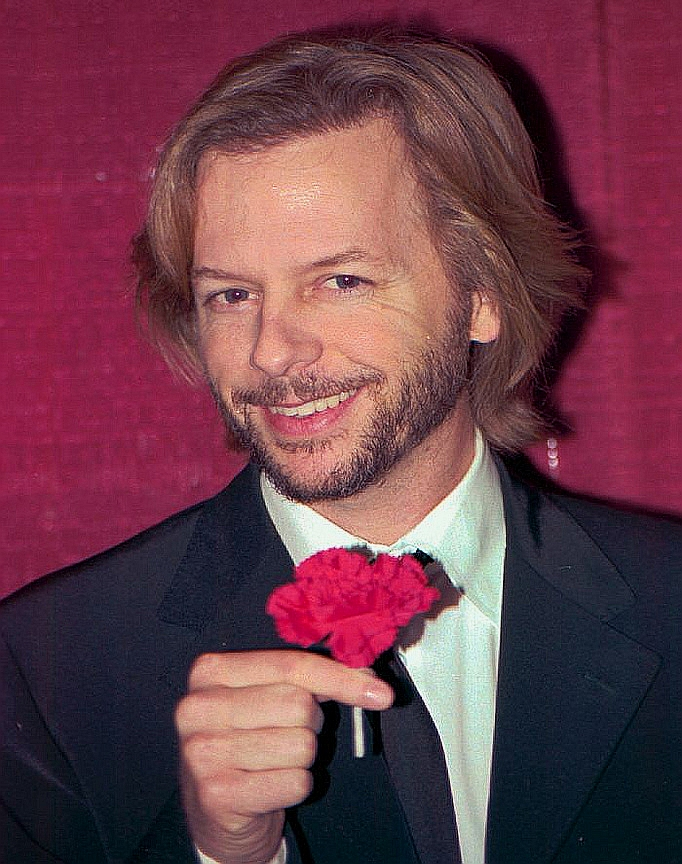
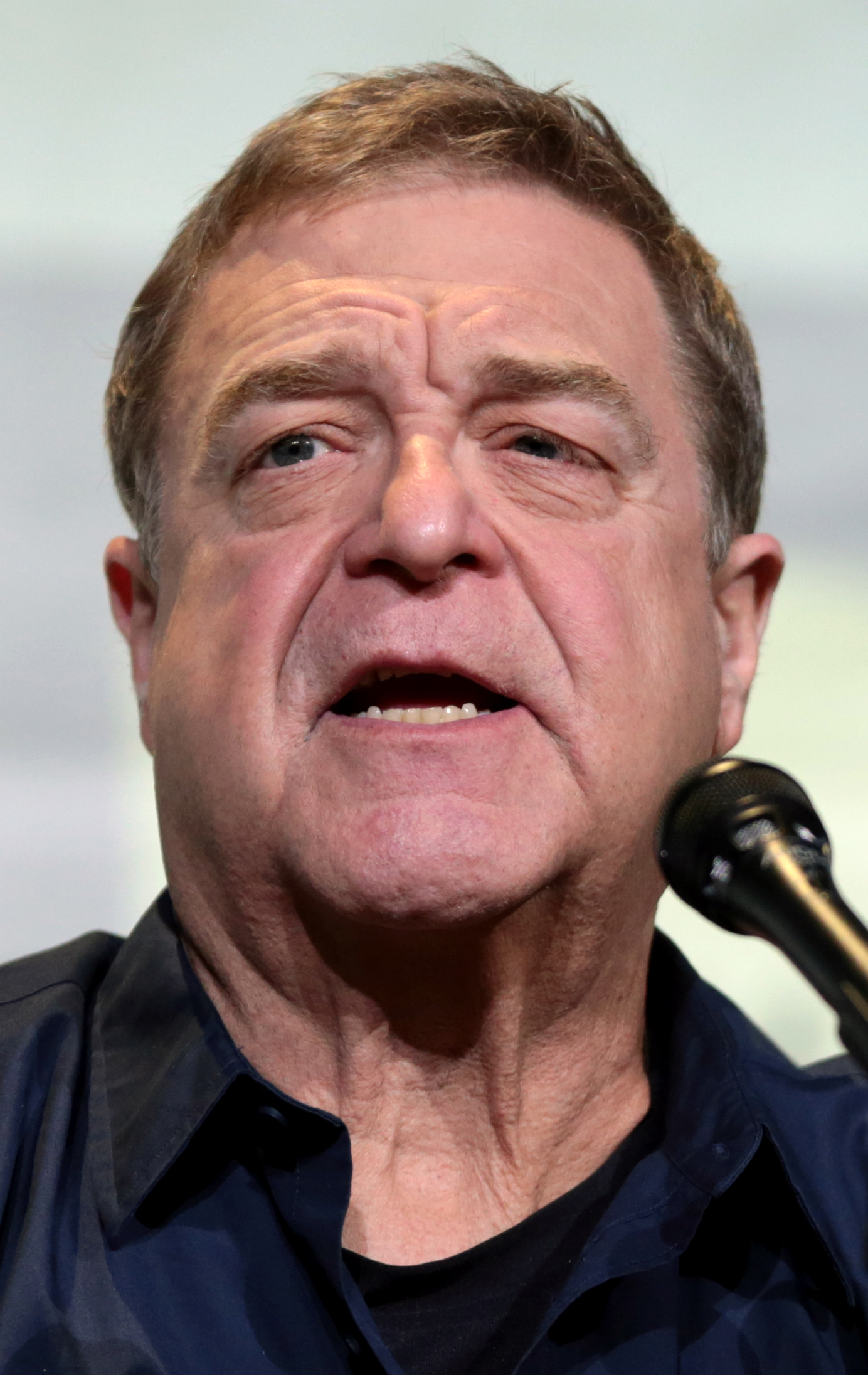
From left to right: David Spade (pictured in 2004) and John Goodman (2016), respectively the voices of Emperor Kuzco and Pacha

To accommodate the new direction taken by The Emperor's New Groove, the choice of voice actors fell on actors associated with comic theatre. The part of Kuzco was given to David Spade, who got his start on Saturday Night Live. The role of Yzma went to Eartha Kitt, a part that earned her an Annie Award. John Goodman was announced to voice the gentle farmer Pacha. After this first collaboration with Disney, Goodman took on other voice acting roles for the Burbank company, including Sulley from Monsters, Inc. Finally, the role of Kronk went to Patrick Warburton.

- David Spade as Emperor Kuzco, the entitled, pampered, and arrogant 18-year-old emperor of the Inca Empire who has no patience for the needs of others and has a lack of compassion
- John Goodman as Pacha, a brave, kind, and humble village leader
- Eartha Kitt as Yzma, Kuzco's evil, elderly advisor who seeks to usurp him
- Patrick Warburton as Kronk, Yzma's hapless and unintelligent muscular sidekick
- Wendie Malick as Chicha, Pacha's supportive, pregnant wife
- Kellyann Kelso and Eli Russell Linnetz as Chaca and Tipo respectively, Pacha and Chicha's two young, mischievous children
- Bob Bergen as Bucky the Squirrel—Kronk's companion who hates Yzma and has an unpleasant encounter with Kuzco—and as a fly stuck in a web
- Tom Jones as the Theme Song Guy, Kuzco's personal theme song conductor
- Patti Deutsch as Mata, a waitress at Mudka's Meat Hut
- John Fiedler as Rudy, a well-meaning old man who is first thrown out a window by Kuzco's guards, then later befriends him
- Joe Whyte as the Royal Recordkeeper (also known as Official)
- Jack Angel, Danny Mann, Rodger Bumpass, Paul Eiding, and Patrick Pinney as male villagers and additional voices
- Sherry Lynn, Jennifer Darling, and Mickie McGowan as female villagers and additional voices
- Jess Harnell as the Guard who throws Rudy out the window and additional voices
- Rodger Bumpass as one of the Guards who got turned into a cow
- Robert Clotworthy as the Guard pointing Pacha's way and additional voices
- Steve Susskind as an Irate Chef, a former chef at Mudka's Meat Hut who quits due to Kuzco and Kronk
- Miriam Flynn as the Piñata Lady
- Kath Soucie as Birthday Singers
- Andre Stojka and Stephen Anderson as Topo and Ipi, two of Pacha's villagers

== Production ==
=== Kingdom of the Sun ===
"Kingdom of the Sun was such a heart-breaking experience for me. I put four years of my heart and energy into that one ... I was creating an 'epic' picture mixing elements of adventure, comedy, romance and mysticism. The head of Disney Features at the time was afraid that we were doing, in his opinion, too many films in the same vein. He was also uncomfortable with the spiritual and cultural (Inca) aspects of it. Hence, he decided to make it a simple slapstick comedy ... Would it have worked out if we had had more time? I would hope so, but one can never know these things."

— Roger Allers, reflecting on the troubled history of Kingdom of the Sun

Following the theatrical release of The Lion King (1994), Roger Allers was called into Thomas Schumacher's office to discuss his next project. Inside his office, Schumacher explained that Disney Feature Animation was interested in exploring ancient cultures for prospective film projects. He held three pictures representative of the Inca, Aztec, and Mayan cultures. Allers chose the Inca culture as he became intrigued with the visual possibilities of the Inca creation myth. Allers would base his story on Anthony Hope's adventure novel The Prisoner of Zenda.

Alongside co-writer Matthew Jacobs, Allers formulated the idea for Kingdom of the Sun, in which development on the project began in 1994. Upon pitching the project to then-Disney CEO and chairman Michael Eisner, Allers recalled Eisner saying, "It has all of the elements of a classic Disney film", and because of his directorial success on The Lion King that same year, Eisner allowed Allers to have free rein with both the casting and the storyline. In January 1995, Variety reported that Allers was working on "an Inca-themed original story". In 1996, the production crew traveled to Machu Picchu in Peru, to study Inca artifacts and architecture, and the landscape this empire was created in.

Kingdom of the Sun was to have been a tale of a greedy, selfish emperor (voiced by David Spade) who finds a peasant (voiced by Owen Wilson) who looks just like him; the emperor swaps places with the peasant to escape his boring life and have fun, much as in author Mark Twain's archetypal novel The Prince and the Pauper. The villainous witch Yzma (voiced by Eartha Kitt) has plans to summon Supay (the evil god of death), and destroy the sun so that she may become young and beautiful forever (the sun gives her wrinkles, so she surmises that living in a world of darkness would prevent her from aging). Discovering the switch between the prince and the peasant, Yzma turns the real emperor into a llama and threatens to reveal the peasant's identity unless he obeys her. During his time as the emperor and doing Yzma's orders, the peasant falls in love with the emperor's soon-to-be fiancée Nina, who thinks he is the emperor who has changed his ways. Meanwhile, the emperor-llama learns humility in his new form and even comes to love a female llama-herder named Mata (voiced by Laura Prepon). Together, the girl and the llama set out to undo the witch's plans. Film critic James Berardinelli wrote that the film would have been a "romantic comedy musical in the 'traditional' Disney style".

After both Pocahontas and The Hunchback of Notre Dame performed below expectations at the box office, studio executives felt that the project was growing too ambitious and serious for audiences following test screenings, and needed more comedy. In early 1997, producer Randy Fullmer contacted and offered Mark Dindal, who had just wrapped up work on Warner Bros.' Cats Don't Dance, to be co-director on Kingdom of the Sun. Meanwhile, Allers personally called Sting, in the wake of Elton John's success with The Lion King: Original Motion Picture Soundtrack, to compose several songs for the film. He agreed, but on the condition that his filmmaker wife Trudie Styler could "document the process of the production". This film, which was eventually entitled The Sweatbox, was made by Xingu Films (their production company). Along with collaborator David Hartley, Sting composed eight songs inextricably linked with the original plot and characters.

In the summer of 1997, it was announced that Allers and Dindal would serve as the film's directors and Randy Fullmer as producer. Spade and Kitt had been confirmed to voice the emperor Manco and the villainess, while Carla Gugino was in talks for the role of Nina. Harvey Fierstein was also cast as Huaca, a 10,000-year-old rock who kept a sharp eye on the emperors who ruled before Manco. In the summer of 1998, it became apparent that Kingdom of the Sun was not far along enough in production to be released in the summer of 2000 as planned. At this time, one of the Disney executives reportedly walked into Fullmer's office and, placing his thumb and index finger a quarter-inch apart, angrily stated "Your film is this close to being shut down." Fullmer approached Allers and informed him of the need to finish the film on time for its summer 2000 release as crucial promotional deals with McDonald's, Coca-Cola, and other companies were already established and depended upon meeting that release date. From screenings, Allers' vision of the film was recognized as having far too many elements. Schumacher and Peter Schneider spoke to Allers and Dindal to try to work out a pared-down film, but the two had different ideas for which direction to take the film. Schumacher and Schneider broke the staff into two small teams under Allers and Dindal and effectively had them run a "bake-off" to decide which version to go. While Allers altered some of the details of the original pitch, Dindal proposed a complete tonal shift into a comedy that Schumacher and Schneider responded favorably to. Allers allowed Dindal's version of the film to go forward and opted to step down from co-director. With this change in direction, on September 23, 1998, the project became dormant with production costs amounting to $25–30 million, and only twenty-five percent of the film animated.

=== Production overhaul and changes ===
Upset that Allers left the project, Eisner gave Fullmer two weeks to salvage the project or production would be completely shut down. In December 1998, Fullmer and Dindal halted production for six months to retool the project, renaming it from Kingdom of the Sun to Kingdom in the Sun, thus making it the first Disney animated feature to have an extensive overhaul since Pinocchio. Meanwhile, following Eric Goldberg's pitch for the Rhapsody in Blue segment for Fantasia 2000, the animators were reassigned to work on the segment.

Story work on the revised film started when they knew what to retain from the original version, namely Spade as Manco and Kitt as Yzma, with the remaining elements to be written around those characters. Chris Williams, who was a storyboard artist during Kingdom of the Sun, came up with the idea of making Pacha an older character as opposed to the teenager that he was in the original version, as to be the opposite of Manco. Following up on the new idea, former late-night comedy writer David Reynolds stated, "I pitched a simple comedy that's basically a buddy road picture with two guys being chased in the style of a Chuck Jones 'toon, but faster paced. Disney said, 'Give it a shot.'" One of the new additions to the revised story was the scene-stealing character of Yzma's sidekick Kronk. Kronk was inspired by actor Rick Rossovich, according to Williams, and as they wrote for him, Reynolds immediately thought of casting Patrick Warburton for the role based on his character Puddy from Seinfeld. Meanwhile, the name Manco was changed to Kuzco following Fullmer's discovery of the Japanese slang term manko, which translates to cunt. Due to in part to the production shutdown, Sting began to develop schedule conflicts with his songwriting duties interfering with his work on Brand New Day, his new album that he was planning to record in Italy. Sting admitted, "I write the music, and then they're supposed to animate it, but there are constantly changes being made. It's constantly in turnaround", but added, "I'm enjoying it." Because of the shutdown, the animated film Dinosaur assumed the summer 2000 release date originally scheduled for Kingdom.

Andreas Deja declined to return to the film after observing his more serious version of Yzma was incompatible with the new comedic tone of the film, and moved to Orlando, Florida to work on Lilo & Stitch. Animator Dale Baer would replace Deja as the supervising animator for Yzma. Fullmer would inform Sting by telephone that his songs, related to specific scenes and characters that were now gone, had to be dropped. Bitter about the removal of his songs, the pop musician commented: "At first, I was angry and perturbed. Then I wanted some vengeance." Disney eventually agreed to allow three of the six deleted songs as bonus tracks on the soundtrack album, such as Yzma's villain song "Snuff Out the Light", the love song "One Day She'll Love Me" and the dance number "Walk the Llama, Llama". The plot elements, such as the romance between the llama herder Pacha and Manco's betrothed Nina, the sun-capturing villain scheme, similarities to The Prince and the Pauper story, and Inca mythology were dropped. The character of Huaca was also dropped, although he would make a cameo appearance as the candle holder during the dinner scene in the finished film. Kuzco—who was a supporting character in the original story—became the protagonist.

In the summer of 1999, cast members Owen Wilson, Harvey Fierstein, and Trudie Styler were dropped from the film. Kitt and Spade remained in the cast, Dindal commented, "[a]nd then John Goodman and Patrick Warburton came aboard." After Sting's songs for Kingdom of the Sun were dropped from the new storyline, Sting remained on the project, although he was told by the studio that "[a]ll we want is a beginning and an end song." The song, "Perfect World", was approached "to open the movie with a big, fun number that established the power of Kuzco and showed how he controlled the world", according to then-Feature Animation president Thomas Schumacher. The filmmakers had asked Sting to perform the song for the film, although Sting declined by telling them that he was too old to sing it and that they should find someone younger and hipper. They instead went with Tom Jones, who is eleven years older than Sting.

In February 2000, the new film was announced as The Emperor's New Groove with its new story centering on a spoiled Inca Emperor—voiced by Spade—who through various twists and falls ends up learning the true meaning of friendship and happiness from a poor peasant voiced by Goodman. The release date was shifted to December 2000. Despite the phrasing of the title, the film is not related to Hans Christian Andersen's classic Danish fairy tale "The Emperor's New Clothes", although both stories involve an emperor being tricked. According to Mark V. Moorhead of the Houston Press, the film's plot bears some resemblance to that of The Golden Ass by Apuleius, wherein a man is turned into a donkey.

Eisner cited concerns regarding tonal similarity to Hercules (1997), aiming to avoid repeating the commercial underperformance of that film. Dindal and Fullmer assured him that The Emperor's New Groove, as the film was now called, would have a much smaller cast, making it easier to attract audiences. Towards the end of production, the film's ending originally had Kuzco building his Kuzcotopia amusement park on another hill by destroying a rainforest near Pacha's home and inviting the former and his family to visit. Horrified at the ending as an environmentalist, Sting commented: "I wrote them a letter and said, 'You do this, I'm resigning because this is exactly the opposite of what I stand for. I've spent 20 years trying to defend the rights of indigenous people and you're just marching over them to build a theme park. I will not be party to this.'" As a result, the ending was rewritten, and saw Kuzco taking the decision to construct a shack similar to Pacha's to spend his vacation among the villagers.

=== Design and animation ===
During the production of Kingdom of the Sun, Deja was the initial supervising animator of Yzma and incorporated supermodel poses published in magazines to capture Yzma's sultry and seductive persona. Nik Ranieri was originally slated as the supervising animator for Yzma's rocky sidekick, Huaca. During the research trip to Peru in 1996, Ranieri acknowledged that he was "researching for a character that looked like a rock so I was stuck drawing rocks for the whole trip. Then when we got back they piled it into this story about ancient Incas." Mark Pudleiner was to be the supervising animator of Kuzco's proposed maiden, Nina. In early 1997, David Pruiksma came on board to animate the llama, Snowball. According to Pruiksma, Snowball was "a silly, vain and egotistical character, rather the dumb blond of the llama set. I really enjoyed developing the character and doing some early test animation on her as well. Before I left the film (and it was ultimately shelved), I created model sheets for not only Snowball, but for the rest of the herd of seven other llamas and for Kuzco as a Llama." When the film was placed on production shutdown, Pruiksma transferred to work on Atlantis: The Lost Empire being developed concurrently and ultimately the llama characters were dropped from the storyline.

Following the production overhaul and the studio's attempts for more cost-efficient animated features, Dindal urged for "a simpler approach that emphasized the characters rather than overwhelming special effects or cinematic techniques". Because of the subsequent departure of Deja, animator Dale L. Baer inherited the character of Yzma. Using Kitt's gestures during recording sessions, Baer commented: "She has a natural voice for animation and really got into the role. She would gesture wildly and it was fun just to watch her. She would come into each session almost serious and very professional and suddenly she would go wild and break up laughing." Ranieri was later asked to serve as the supervising animator of Kuzco (as a human and a llama), although he would admit being reluctant at first until he discovered that Kuzco "had a side to him, there was a lot of comedy potential and as a character he went through an arc". Pudleiner was also reassigned to work as an animator of the human version of Kuzco. In addition to drawing inspiration from Spade during recording sessions, the Kuzco animation team studied llamas at the zoo, visited a llama farm, watched nature documentaries, and even observed the animals up close when they came for a visit to the studio. For the rewritten version of Pacha, animator Bruce W. Smith observed that "Pacha is probably the most human of all the characters", and further added that he "has more human mannerisms and realistic traits, which serve as a contrast to the cartoony llama he hangs out with. He is the earthy guy who brings everything back into focus. Being a big fellow about six-foot-five and weighing about 250 pounds we had to work hard to give him a sense of weight and believability in his movement."

Actual animation began in May 1999, involving 400 artists, 300 technicians, and production personnel. Outside of the Walt Disney Feature Animation studio building in Burbank, California, animators located at Walt Disney Feature Animation Florida and Walt Disney Feature Animation Paris assisted in the production of The Emperor's New Groove. During the last eighteen months of production, a 120-crew of clean-up artists would take the character animators' drawings and place a new piece of paper over the existing drawing to draw a cleaner, more refined image. The motion reference material for the film was extensive, and included live-action footage of the actors, respectively including Gustavo Rodríguez (born in 1981), Delia Reátegui (born 1963), Alonso Cano (born 1989), and Gabriela Villalobos (born 1988) as Kuzco, Chicha, and Chicha's slim children Tipo and Chaca, performing the scenes. Clean-up supervisor Vera Pacheco, whose crew worked on more than 200,000 drawings for the film, said: "We're basically the final designers."

=== Iconography ===
The Emperor's New Groove incorporates various visual and cultural elements inspired by the Andean world, particularly the Inca Empire, although its representation is heavily filtered through a Western comedic lens. The film's setting—a mountainous landscape with shifting terrains—resembles the highlands of Peru and draws visual parallels to well-known archaeological sites such as Machu Picchu. Reportedly inspired by a photo of Machu Picchu hanging in Schumacher's office, Allers proposed an epic Disney musical film set in Peru during the Inca Empire. While the location in the film is fictional, architectural motifs, agricultural terraces, and stepped structures resemble Andean features. Costume and textile designs in the film further reflect Andean aesthetics. Characters are depicted wearing ponchos, tunics, and headdresses that mirror traditional Andean garments. These garments feature geometric patterns and earth-toned colors—such as reds, yellows, and greens—that are historically significant in Andean textile traditions. Yzma is costumed in black and purple, diverging from traditional Andean palettes to signify her role as the antagonist.

Animals play a significant role in the film's iconography. Llamas, native to the Andes and essential to transportation and agriculture, are central to the plot—most notably in the transformation of Emperor Kuzco into a llama. This metamorphosis loosely echoes Andean spiritual motifs of transformation, although it is recontextualized for comedic effect rather than to convey religious or cosmological meaning. Other animals with Andean symbolic associations, such as jaguars and condors, appear in background elements and wilderness scenes. Despite these visual nods to Andean culture, scholars argue that the film lacks depth in its cultural representation. The omission of Andean religious elements—particularly the absence of deities and cosmological beliefs central to the Incan worldview—limits the authenticity of the narrative. Originally conceived as Kingdom of the Sun, the film was intended to explore Incan mythology more explicitly; the project was restructured into a slapstick comedy following creative challenges and unfavorable test screenings.

In the mid-2010s, the film sparked a discussion among leftists around cultural appropriation versus representation. While it visually references Andean culture, it simplifies or omits core aspects such as governance, spiritual practices, and astronomical knowledge. Critics observed that this reflects broader trends in Western media that prioritize entertainment value over cultural accuracy when depicting non-Western civilizations. For example, although it is recognizable to archaeologists, The Emperor's New Groove does not explicitly say that it is set in Inca Peru; this was contrasted with Brother Bear and its portrayal of the traditions and culture of Alaska Natives. Nevertheless, The Emperor's New Groove remains notable for its use of recognizable Andean imagery. Through stylized depictions of architecture, textiles, and symbolic animals, the film offers a visual homage to Andean culture, although one that prompts critical discourse regarding the balance between cultural inspiration and narrative integrity.

=== Music ===
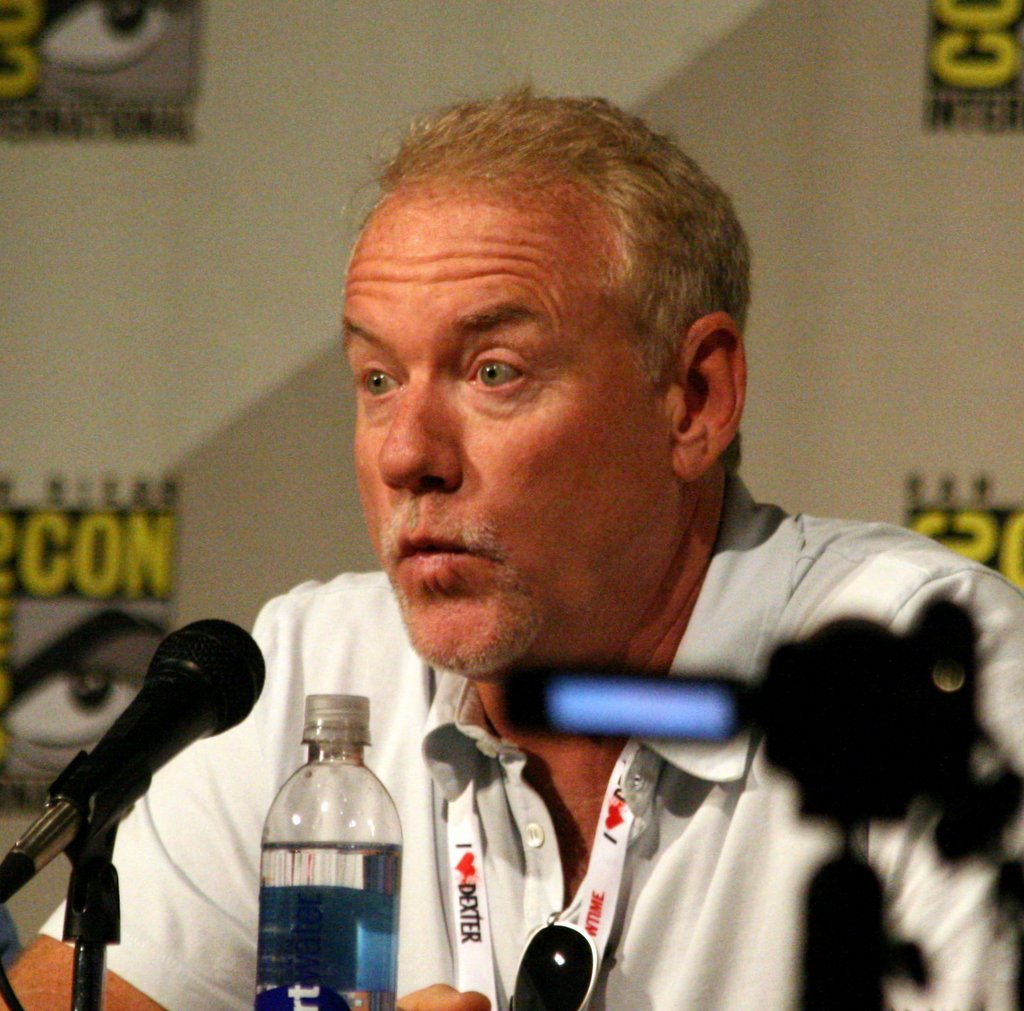
John Debney composed the film's score.

The soundtrack of The Emperor's New Groove features vocal performances by Shawn Colvin, Tom Jones, Eartha Kitt, Rascal Flatts, and Sting. Released in 2000 by Walt Disney Records, the music and lyrics is by Sting and David Hartley, and the score is by John Debney. The album included Spanish and Italian versions of "My Funny Friend and Me", and also many songs that were written for the original incarnation of the project known as the Kingdom of the Sun.

== Release ==
=== Similarities with The Road to El Dorado and marketing campaign ===
After the release date had shifted to December 15, 2000, similarities were noted between the film and The Road to El Dorado, which was produced by DreamWorks Animation. Jeffrey Katzenberg had been at Disney while production began on Kingdom of the Sun but then left and started DreamWorks in 1994. There was some speculation that The Road to El Dorado was based on what Katzenberg had seen while at Disney. Marc Lument, a visual development artist for El Dorado, stated, "It really was a race, and Katzenberg wanted ours out before theirs", and also added, "We didn't know exactly what they were doing, but we had the impression it was going to be very similar. Whoever came out second would face the impression that they copied the other."

Fullmer and Dindal denied the similarities, with the latter commenting, "This version [The Emperor's New Groove] was well in the works when that movie came out." Dindal further added, "Early on, when our movie got to be very comic, all of us felt that you can't be making this farce about a specific group of people unless we are going to poke fun at ourselves. This didn't seem to be a proper choice about Incas or any group of people. It was more of a fable."

The marketing campaign for The Emperor's New Groove was relatively restrained as Disney opted to heavily promote the release of 102 Dalmatians, which was released during Thanksgiving. Nevertheless, the film was accompanied by six launcher toys of Kuzco, Kuzco as a llama, Pacha, Yzma, Yzma as a cat, and Kronk, accompanied by Happy Meals at McDonald's in North America. McDonald's also released toys for the film in Europe and Asia. The film premiered at the El Capitan Theatre on December 10, 2000, with Sting in attendance.

=== Home media ===
The film was released on VHS and DVD on May 1, 2001, and September 30, 2003, as well as a "2-Disc Collector's Edition" that included bonus features such as Sting's music video of "My Funny Friend and Me", a Rascal Flatts music video of "Walk the Llama, Llama" from the soundtrack, audio commentary with the filmmakers, a multi-skill-level set-top game with the voice cast, and deleted scenes among other features. This THX-certified DVD release also contained a DTS 5.1 audio track and DVD-ROM.

For its first week of release, the film ranked second on both the DVD sales chart and the VHS sales chart, behind Miss Congeniality and 102 Dalmatians respectively. The film performed better on home video than on theatrical release, becoming Billboard's top-selling home video release of 2001 in the United States. In September 2001, it was reported that six million VHS units were sold amounting to $89 million in revenue. On DVD, it was also reported it had sold twice as many sales. The overall revenue averaged toward $125 million according to Adams Media Research. It was re-released on VHS on February 26, 2003. Disney re-released a single-disc special edition called "The New Groove Edition" on October 19, 2005. Disney then digitally remastered and released The Emperor's New Groove on Blu-ray on June 12, 2013, bundled in a two-movie collection combo pack with its sequel Kronk's New Groove. On its first weekend, it sold 14,000 Blu-ray units grossing $282,000. A 4K Ultra HD Blu-ray was released on December 9, 2025, to coincide with the film's 25th anniversary, following a run at the El Capitan Theatre from November 21–23, 2025.

== Reception ==
=== Box office ===
The Emperor's New Groove grossed $169.5 million on a $100-million budget. Despite making back its budget, it was considered a box office disappointment, grossing considerably less than any of Disney's animated films from the 1990s. The film grossed roughly $10 million on its opening weekend, opening in fourth place behind What Women Want, Dude, Where's My Car?, and How the Grinch Stole Christmas. It also competed with Disney's own 102 Dalmatians, which had been released just three weeks prior. The film ultimately made $89.3 million in the United States and an additional $80 million worldwide for a total of $169.6 million, the lowest box office earnings for an animated Disney feature since the 1980s. In January 2021, the movie was re-released in theaters and earned an additional $334,000.

Because of its pre-Columbian setting and Latin American flavor, Disney spent $250,000 in its marketing campaign towards the Latino market releasing dual English- and Spanish-language theatrical prints in 16 multiplexes across heavily populated Latino areas in Los Angeles, California, in contrast to only releasing dubbed or subtitled theatrical prints of their previous animated features in foreign markets. By January 2001, 19 days into its theatrical general release, the Spanish-dubbed prints were pulled from multiplexes as Hispanic Americans opted to watch the English-language prints with its grossing averaging $571,000 in comparison to $96,000 for the former.

=== Critical response ===
The film received generally positive reviews from critics. On the review aggregator website Rotten Tomatoes, 86% of 135 critics' reviews are positive, with an average rating of 7.5/10. The website's consensus reads: "The Emperor's New Groove isn't the most ambitious animated film, but its brisk pace, fresh characters, and big laughs make for a great time for the whole family." Metacritic, which uses a weighted average, assigned the film a score of 70 out of 100, based on 28 critics, indicating "generally favorable reviews". Audiences polled by CinemaScore gave the film an average grade of "A" on an A+ to F scale.

Writing for Variety, Robert Koehler commented the film "may not match the groovy business of many of the studio's other kidpix, but it will be remembered as the film that established a new attitude in the halls of Disney's animation unit." Roger Ebert, writing his review for Chicago Sun-Times, awarded the film 3 (out of 4) stars distinguishing the film as "a goofy slapstick cartoon, with the attention span of Donald Duck that is separate from what's known as animated features". Ebert would later add that "it doesn't have the technical polish of a film like Tarzan, but is a reminder that the classic cartoon look is a beloved style of its own." Emma Cochrane of Empire gave the film a three out of five stars, writing, "An attractive, generally enjoyable concoction, but never really hits its comedic or emotional targets full on. Fun but quickly forgettable." Lisa Schwarzbaum of Entertainment Weekly graded the film a B+, describing it as a "hip, funny, mostly nonmusical, decidedly non-epic family picture, which turns out to be less of a hero's journey than a meeting of sitcom minds."

In contrast to the positive reviews, Marc Savlov of The Austin Chronicle gave the film 2 stars out of 5, noting that the film "suffers from a persistent case of narrative backsliding that only serves to make older members of the audience long for the days of the dwarves, beauties, and poisoned apples of Disney-yore, and younger ones squirm in their seats." Savlov also unfavorably compared the film's animation to that of Tarzan, writing it "is also a minor letdown, with none of the ecstatic visual tour de force." Bob Strauss, in his review for the Los Angeles Daily News, acknowledged that the film is "funny, frantic and colorful enough to keep the small fry diverted for its short but strained 78 minutes". He added that except for "some nice voice work, a few impressive scale gags, and interesting, Inca-inspired design elements", there was "very little here for the rest of the family to latch onto". Strauss blamed the film's story overhaul during production as the main problem.

=== Accolades ===
In 2018, The Emperor's New Groove was named the 16th-best Disney animated film by IGN, and the 27th by Rotten Tomatoes in November 2022. In 2022, it did not appear in lists of the best Disney movies, between the 50 selected by Time Out and the 35 chosen by Harper's Bazaar.

List of awards and nominations
Award	Category	Nominee(s)	Result	Ref.
Academy Awards	Best Original Song	"My Funny Friend and Me"; Music by Sting and David Hartley; Lyrics by Sting	Nominated	
Annie Awards	Best Animated Feature		Nominated	
Annie Awards	Outstanding Individual Achievement for Character Animation	Dale Baer	Won	
Annie Awards	Outstanding Individual Achievement for Directing in an Animated Feature Production	Mark Dindal	Nominated	
Annie Awards	Outstanding Individual Achievement for Music Score in an Animated Feature Production	John Debney	Nominated	
Annie Awards	Outstanding Individual Achievement for a Song in an Animated Production	Sting and David Hartley	Won	
Annie Awards	Outstanding Individual Achievement for Production Design in an Animated Feature; Production	Colin Stimpson	Nominated	
Annie Awards	Outstanding Individual Achievement for Storyboarding in an Animated Feature Production	Stephen J. Anderson and Don Hall	Nominated	
Annie Awards	Outstanding Individual Achievement for Voice Acting by a Male Performer in an Animated Feature Production	Patrick Warburton	Nominated	
Annie Awards	Outstanding Individual Achievement for Voice Acting by a Female Performer in an Animated Feature Production	Eartha Kitt	Won	
Annie Awards	Outstanding Individual Achievement for Writing in an Animated Feature Production	Screenplay by David Reynolds; Story by Chris Williams and Mark Dindal	Nominated	
Artios Awards	Animated Voice-Over Feature Casting	Ruth Lambert	Won	
Black Reel Awards	Best Supporting Actress	Eartha Kitt	Nominated	
Blockbuster Entertainment Awards	Favorite Family Film		Nominated	
Bogey Awards			Nominated	
Critics' Choice Movie Awards	Best Animated Feature		Nominated	
Critics' Choice Movie Awards	Best Song	"My Funny Friend and Me"; Music by Sting and David Hartley; Lyrics by Sting	Won	
Golden Globe Awards	Best Original Song	"My Funny Friend and Me"; Music by Sting and David Hartley; Lyrics by Sting	Nominated	
Golden Reel Awards	Best Sound Editing – Animated Feature	Tim Chau, Thomas Whiting, Albert Gasser, Nils C. Jensen, David Kern, and Donald Sylvester	Nominated	
Golden Reel Awards	Best Sound Editing – Music – Animated Feature	Paul Silver	Nominated	
Golden Trailer Awards	Best Animation/Family		Nominated	
Grammy Awards	Best Song Written for a Motion Picture, Television or Other Visual Media	"My Funny Friend and Me" – Sting and David Hartley	Nominated	
Las Vegas Film Critics Society Awards	Best Family Film		Nominated	
Las Vegas Film Critics Society Awards	Best Original Song	"My Funny Friend and Me" – Sting and David Hartley	Nominated	
Nickelodeon Kids' Choice Awards	Favorite Voice From an Animated Movie	David Spade	Nominated	
Online Film & Television Association Awards	Best Animated Picture	Randy Fullmer	Nominated	
Online Film & Television Association Awards	Best Original Song	"My Funny Friend and Me"; Music by Sting and David Hartley; Lyrics by Sting	Nominated	
Phoenix Film Critics Society Awards	Best Animated Film		Nominated	
Phoenix Film Critics Society Awards	Best Family Film		Nominated	
Phoenix Film Critics Society Awards	Best Original Song	"My Funny Friend and Me"; Music by Sting and David Hartley; Lyrics by Sting	Nominated	
Satellite Awards	Best Animated or Mixed Media Feature		Nominated	
Satellite Awards	Best Original Song	"My Funny Friend and Me"; Music by Sting and David Hartley; Lyrics by Sting	Nominated	
Young Artist Awards	Best Family Feature Film – Animated		Nominated	

== The Sweatbox ==
The Sweatbox is a documentary that chronicled the tumultuous collaboration of Sting and David Hartley with the Disney studios to compose six songs for Kingdom of the Sun (the film's working title). The documentary featured interviews from directors Roger Allers and Mark Dindal, producer Randy Fullmer, Sting (whose wife Trudie Styler created the documentary), Disney story artists, and the voice cast being dismayed by the new direction. Disney was not believed to be opposed to Styler's documentary, with Disney animation executive Thomas Schumacher, who had seen footage, commenting: "I think it's going to be great!"

The film premiered at the 2002 Toronto International Film Festival but went virtually unseen by the public ever since. Some scenes from the documentary could be seen from the home media release, including the behind-the-scenes and the making of "My Funny Friend and Me". Although Disney owns the rights, it never officially released it. In March 2012, a workprint of the documentary was leaked online and was uploaded onto YouTube by a United Kingdom cartoonist before it was ultimately pulled.

== Legacy ==
The Emperor's New Groove was not as well received as Disney's other animated features at the time, which were more focused on Broadway-style musicals like Beauty and the Beast or heroic characters with comedy situations like Hercules, and arrived just before films like Shrek and Ice Age that would launch a wave of animated comedy films. Reception towards the film improved over time, with Polygon's Petrana Radulovic theorizing that the film's irreverent style of comedy had simply been released at the wrong time by debuting too soon after the tonal shift away from the musical animated films that had defined the 1990s, and too early for the humor that would become trademarks of films such as Shrek and Ice Age.

In subsequent years and decades, The Emperor's New Groove and The Road to El Dorado gained appreciation as standalone works from that period as well-written comedies in part due to the arrival of Internet culture, and became something of a cult favorite among Disney fans at the time. As a result of its comedic timing and slapstick comedy comparable to classic Looney Tunes, numerous Internet memes based on screenshots from The Emperor's New Groove emerged, such as Pacha's "just right" gesture as an image macro representing perfection, or a meme during the COVID-19 pandemic featuring Kronk documenting "Apocalypse Bingo", a group of memes about the bad things of 2020. For 2025, the film's 25-year anniversary, The Emperor's New Groove was part of "the Biggest Disney Fan Event of the year", Destination D23, at the Walt Disney World Resort. In November 2025, many crew members, including the film's director Mark Dindal, writer David Reynolds, story supervisor Stephen Anderson, and cast member Bob Bergen who voiced Bucky the Squirrel, reunited to celebrate the film's 25-year anniversary by participating in a two-hour livestream on YouTube on The Tammy Tuckey Show.

Over the years, The Emperor's New Groove attracted a cult following in several countries, particularly Italy. The Italian version is considered to be an adaptation rather than an accurate translation. Although the Italian adaptation did not impact the story, it changed the tempo of the action, significantly altering the characterizations, and became part of Italian common parlance and meme culture.

== Franchise ==
DisneyToon Studios produced a direct-to-video sequel titled Kronk's New Groove, which was released on December 13, 2005, to mostly negative reviews. This was followed to mixed reviews by an animated television series on Disney Channel titled The Emperor's New School, where Kuzco must complete high school in order to retain his claim on the throne. A majority of the film's voice cast returned for the series. Patrick Warburton, Eartha Kitt, and Wendie Malick reprised their roles for the sequel and series while J. P. Manoux replaced David Spade for the series, and Fred Tatasciore voiced Pacha in season 1. John Goodman subsequently reprised his role for the second and final season of the series. Kuzco appears as a recurring guest in the animated television series House of Mouse, and also its direct-to-video film Mickey's Magical Christmas: Snowed in at the House of Mouse, with Pacha, Yzma, and the Royal Recordkeeper having minor guest appearances in the show. Like every other Walt Disney Animation Studios character, Kuzco, Pacha, Yzma, and Kronk make appearances in the short film Once Upon a Studio.

A video game, The Emperor's New Groove, was developed and released concurrently with the film. It was developed by Argonaut Games and published by Sony Computer Entertainment of America for the Sony PlayStation while Sandbox and Ubisoft respectively developed and published it for the Nintendo Game Boy Color. Both versions were released in PAL territories the following year. A DVD-Rom game demo was included on the DVD release of its movie counterpart, accessible by inserting the DVD into a PC; unlike the movie, the role of Kuzco in the game was portrayed by Manoux, who had debuted as Kuzco in a DVD bonus feature for The Emperor's New Groove. The PlayStation version was re-released on PlayStation 3 and the PlayStation Portable as a PS one Classic for the North American PlayStation Network on July 27, 2010, and was also made downloadable for the PlayStation Vita in 2012. Additionally, Kuzco, Pacha, Yzma, and Kronk appear as playable characters in the world-builder video game Disney Magic Kingdoms, which also includes attractions based on Mudka's Meat Hut and Yzma's Lair. The Tokyo DisneySea rollercoaster attraction Raging Spirits took visual inspiration for its Inca ruins theme from the buildings in the film with a structure based on Kuzco's palace similarly crowning the ruins site.

== See also ==
- List of Disney theatrical animated features
