= David Hartley (musician) =

US musician who collaborated with Sting

David Hartley or Dave Hartley is a musician especially notable for several collaborations with Sting. Their cooperations include writing songs for the Walt Disney Animation Studios' The Emperor's New Groove, arranging for the song "You Will Be My Ain True Love" from Cold Mountain, and performing on the Sting albums Brand New Day and Sacred Love as a string arranger and conductor as well as playing piano and Hammond organ.

Together with Sting he has received an Annie Award and a BFCA Award for songs of The Emperor's New Groove, as well as nominations for an Oscar, Golden Globe, Grammy, BAFTA TV and Golden Satellite Award.
