= Beagle (disambiguation) =

A beagle is a breed of dog.

Beagle may also refer to:

== Places ==
- Beagle Channel, a strait separating islands of the Tierra del Fuego archipelago, in extreme southern South America
- Beagle Islands, the Picton, Lennox and Nueva islands, south of the Beagle Channel
- Beagle Gulf, Northern Territory, Australia
- Beagle Island, Tasmania, Australia
- Beagle Island (Antarctica)
- Beagle, Kansas, an unincorporated community, United States
- Beagle, Kentucky, an unincorporated community, United States
- Beagle, Oregon, an unincorporated community, United States
- Beagle (crater), a crater on Mars
- 656 Beagle, a minor planet

== People ==
- Jay Beagle (born 1985), Canadian ice hockey player
- Peter S. Beagle (born 1939), American fantasy writer

== Other uses ==
- List of ships named HMS Beagle
  - HMS Beagle, the ship that took Darwin on his voyage
- Beagle: In Darwin's wake (Beagle: In het kielzog van Darwin), a Dutch popular science television series
- Beagle (beer), a brand of beer used by Cervecería Fueguina
- BeagleBoard, a computer produced by Texas Instruments
- Beagle Aircraft, a former British aircraft manufacturer
- Ilyushin Il-28 bomber's NATO reporting name
- Bagle (computer worm), a computer worm also known as Beagle
- Bedford Beagle, an estate car conversion of the Bedford HA 8cwt van

== See also ==
- Beagle 2, a spacecraft
- Beagle Bay (disambiguation)
- Baggle
- Bagle (disambiguation)
