= Mark Dindal =

American effects animator and filmmaker

- Born: Columbus, Ohio, U.S.
- Education: CalArts
- Occupations: Film director; screenwriter; effects animator; character designer; storyboard artist; voice actor
- Years active: 1979–present
- Employer: Walt Disney Feature Animation (1980–1992, 1997–2006)
- Children: 2

Mark Dindal is an American filmmaker, effects animator and voice actor. Best known for his work at Disney, he directed the company's 2000 animated film The Emperor's New Groove (2000), as well as their 2005 film Chicken Little. Prior, he was credited with animation work on the Disney Renaissance films The Little Mermaid (1989) and Aladdin (1992), as well as Tom and Jerry: The Movie (1992). In 1997, he briefly moved to Warner Bros. Animation and made his directorial debut with the film Cats Don't Dance, which won an Annie Award for Best Animated Film. Dindal directed the 2024 animated film The Garfield Movie for Sony Pictures and Alcon Entertainment, which was met with commercial success despite mixed-to-negative reviews.

== Early life ==
Dindal was born in Columbus, Ohio.

Growing up, Dindal was influenced by Disney films and Warner Bros. Cartoons. One of his earliest influences was Disney's The Sword in the Stone, which he remembers his grandmother taking him to see when he was three years old. It also helped that his father took art as a hobby and taught Dindal to draw while growing up in Syracuse, New York.

During his teen years, Dindal attended Jamesville-DeWitt High School, where he attended most of the art classes that the school had to offer, along with making comic strips and short films. Dindal learned animation at CalArts. He began working at Disney in 1980.

== Career ==
=== Effects animator at Disney (1980–1988) ===
His early work included The Fox and the Hound (1981), The Black Cauldron (1985), Mickey's Christmas Carol (1983), The Great Mouse Detective (1986), and Oliver & Company (1988), each following a very similar animation style in all the films. This style consisted of similar backgrounds with delicate animation and complex character effects, which was well received.

=== Leaving and returning to Disney (1986–1992) ===
After these projects, Dindal briefly left Disney to work on several projects for varying studios, including BraveStarr and The Brave Little Toaster. He returned to the studio in 1987 and got his first head role as a visual effects supervisor for The Little Mermaid (1989). He later worked as head animator for the film The Rescuers Down Under (1990) and worked as an effects animator on the animated film Aladdin (1992).

=== Dindal as director (1991–2000) ===
Dindal’s first time in the director’s chair was for a short, 1940s style wartime propaganda segment for the 1991 superhero film, The Rocketeer. Working with a crew of 3 other animators, Dindal took inspiration from Disney wartime cartoons like Victory Through Air Power and Frank Capra’s Why We Fight series.

Dindal's feature-length debut was Cats Don't Dance, which was released in 1997, three years before The Emperor's New Groove was released in 2000. In Cats Don't Dance Dindal voiced Max. The film won the Annie Award for Best Animated Film and Dindal was nominated for directing. The Emperor's New Groove was initially expected to be a Disney musical feature called Kingdom of the Sun. However, the idea did not work out, so Dindal, along with Chris Williams and David Reynolds changed the script to a comedy. During the six-year production, he started to work on Cats Don't Dance, a Turner Broadcasting (since merged into Warner Bros.) animated musical production.

=== Chicken Little (2005) ===
Dindal worked on Chicken Little (2005), another Disney production, which needed a large animation team. Dindal voiced Morkubine Porcupine and Coach in the film. The film was nominated for several Annies, though Dindal was not nominated as a director. During the film's production, DisneyToon Studios produced Kronk's New Groove as a direct-to-video feature. As Dindal was working on Chicken Little at the time, he did not have a position on the staff. Later, Dindal created the TV series The Emperor's New School (2006–2008).

=== Post-Disney (2006–present) ===
In March 2006, a day after the DVD release of Chicken Little, Dindal and producer Randy Fullmer left the company because they were reportedly tired of dealing with then-WDFA head David Stainton. Over the span of three years, Dindal was attached to direct several live-action films, including Sherlock's Secretary and Housebroken, both for Walden Media, and a film adaptation of the children's book Kringle for Paramount Pictures.

In December 2010, Dindal was directing at DreamWorks Animation the animated film Me and My Shadow, based on his own pitch that would've combined both computer and traditional animation. In January 2012, he was no longer directing the film and was replaced by story artist Alessandro Carloni as director, and the film has been in development limbo since 2013.

In July 2014, he provided illustrations for the documentary film Restrung, centering on colleague Randy Fullmer on his career at Wyn Guitars from 2006. On November 12, 2018, it was announced that Dindal will direct an animated Garfield feature for Alcon Entertainment, with pre-production beginning the following month in Los Angeles. In March 2019, Dindal was involved as a story artist and helped design the characters Gus and Cooper for the 2019 Nickelodeon film Wonder Park. That same year, it was announced that Dindal, along with Pixar veteran Teddy Newton, would develop a film based on the Funko toys for Warner Bros. Pictures Animation, with the former serving as director.

In November 2021, it was announced that The Garfield Movie was picked up by Sony Pictures Releasing for a worldwide release (excluding China), and would star Chris Pratt as the titular role. The film also reunited Dindal with New Groove screenwriter David Reynolds, who wrote the script. In September 2022, the film was scheduled to be released on May 24, 2024. The film received mixed-to-negative reviews from critics but was a commercial success. In July 2025, a sequel was announced with Dindal possibly returning as director.

=== Unrealized projects ===
- Kingdom of the Sun - an epic retelling of The Prince and the Pauper in the vein of The Lion King. Dindal served as co-director and reworked the project into The Emperor's New Groove (for Walt Disney Feature Animation; 1994).
- Sherlock's Secretary - a live-action film about a man who resides at the infamous home of Sherlock Holmes, who receives a letter requesting the help of Holmes. The man's life changes when he decides to take on a case himself (for Walden Media; 2006).
- Kringle - a film adaptation of the book under the same name that tells the untold story of Santa Claus (for Paramount Pictures; 2007).
- Housebroken - a live-action comedy film about a newlywed couple's talking pets, who must adjust to living together under one roof. Along with directing, Dindal would also polish the script, originally written by Made of Honor screenwriter Adam Sztykiel. The last update was in 2011 when the film would be rewritten by George Lopez writers Paul Kaplan and Mark Torgove (for Walden Media and 20th Century Fox; 2009).
- Me and My Shadow - (for DreamWorks Animation; 2010)
- Unannounced film - according to editor Mark Keefer, Dindal was helming an animated feature at Disneytoon Studios before the studio’s closure on June 28, 2018 (2018).

== Personal life ==
Dindal is the father of two daughters, who were the inspiration for his original Chicken Little pitch.

== Filmography ==
Year	Title	Director	Story	Animation Department	Storyboard artist	Other	Note
1981	The Fox and the Hound	No	No	Yes	No	No	Effects inbetween artist (uncredited)
1982	Fun with Mr. Future	No	No	Yes	No	No	
1983	Mickey's Christmas Carol	No	No	Yes	No	No	Effects animator
1985	The Black Cauldron	No	No	Yes	No	No	Effects animator
1986	The Great Mouse Detective	No	No	Yes	No	No	Effects animator
1987	Sport Goofy in Soccermania	No	No	Yes	No	No	Effects animator
1987	The Brave Little Toaster	No	No	No	No	Yes	Effects animation consultant
1987	Pinocchio and the Emperor of the Night	No	No	Yes	No	No	Special effects animator
1988	BraveStarr	No	No	Yes	No	No	Special effects animator
1988	BraveStarr: The Legend	No	No	Yes	No	No	Effects animator
1988	Oliver & Company	No	No	Yes	No	No	Effects animator
1989	The Little Mermaid	No	No	Yes	No	No	Visual effects supervisor
1990	The Prince and the Pauper	No	No	No	Yes	No	
1990	The Rescuers Down Under	No	No	Yes	No	No	Head effects animator
1991	The Rocketeer	No	No	Yes	No	No	Director: Nazi Invasion segment
1992	Frozen Assets	No	No	No	No	Yes	Animation sequence producer
1992	Tom and Jerry: The Movie	No	No	Yes	No	No	Effects animator
1992	Aladdin	No	No	Yes	No	No	Effects animator
1992	The Little Mermaid	No	No	Yes	Yes (1 episode)	Yes	Effects consultant (1 episode), effects animator (2 episodes)
1993	Happily Ever After	No	No	Yes	No	No	Special effects animator, voice of Goons (uncredited)
1997	Cats Don't Dance	Yes	Yes	Yes	Yes	Yes	Character designer, storyboard supervisor, voice of Max
2000	The Emperor's New Groove	Yes	Yes	No	No	No	
2002	The Sweatbox	No	No	No	No	Yes	Himself, documentary
2005	Chicken Little	Yes	Yes	Yes	No	Yes	Character designer, voice of Morkubine Porcupine & Coach
2005	Kronk's New Groove	No	No	No	No	Yes	Based on characters (uncredited)
2006–2008	The Emperor's New School	No	No	No	No	No	Creator
2014	Restrung	No	No	No	No	Yes	Illustrator, documentary
2019	Wonder Park	No	No	No	Yes	No	
2024	The Garfield Movie	Yes	No	Yes	Yes	Yes	Character designer, voice of Sleep App, lyricist for Lactose Farm Jingle
TBA	Funko	Yes	No	No	No	No	

=== Internet ===
Year	Title	Role
2011	TAG Blog	Himself
2015	Lights, Camera, Austin	Himself
2020	Happily Ever After Hours	Himself
2021	Disney Movie Insider Presents	Himself
2022	The Mouse Watch (book trailer)	Effects animator

== Reception ==
Critical, public and commercial reception to films Dindal has directed as of March 27, 2025.

Film	Rotten Tomatoes	Metacritic	CinemaScore	Budget	Box office
Cats Don't Dance	71% (24 reviews)	62 (21 reviews)	B	$32 million	$3.5 million
The Emperor's New Groove	86% (135 reviews)	70 (28 reviews)	A	$100 million	$169.7 million
Chicken Little	37% (161 reviews)	48 (32 reviews)	A−	$150 million	$314.4 million
The Garfield Movie	36% (137 reviews)	31 (29 reviews)	B+	$60 million	$257.2 million

== Awards and nominations ==
=== Nominations ===
- Best Individual Achievement: Directing in a Feature Production for Cats Don't Dance (Annie) (1997)
- Outstanding Individual Achievement for Writing in an Animated Feature Production for The Emperor's New Groove (Annie) (2001)
- Outstanding Individual Achievement for Directing in an Animated Feature Production for The Emperor's New Groove (Annie) (2001)
- Best Animated Feature for The Emperor's New Groove & Chicken Little (Annie) (2001; 2006)
- Best Animated or Mixed Media Feature for The Emperor's New Groove & Chicken Little (Satellite Award) (2000; 2005)
- Best Animated Feature for Chicken Little (Critics' Choice Movie Awards) (2005)

=== Won ===
- Best Animated Feature for Cats Don't Dance (Annie) (1997)
