= Earle Island =

Island of Antarctica

- Location within Antarctica

Geography
- Location: Antarctica
- Coordinates: 63°29′S 54°47′W
- Archipelago: Danger Islands
- Area: 20 ha (49 acres)
- Length: 0.5 km (0.31 mi)

Administration
- Administered under the Antarctic Treaty System

Demographics
- Population: Uninhabited

Earle Island is a small ice-free island 6 kilometres (3 nmi) south-west of Darwin Island which marks the south-western end of the Danger Islands. Following hydrographic work in the area from HMS Endurance in 1977–78, it was named, in association with Beagle Island and other names in the group, after Augustus Earle, an artist on board HMS Beagle.

== Important Bird Area ==
The 20 ha island has been designated an Important Bird Area (IBA) by BirdLife International because it supports several species of breeding seabirds, especially Pygoscelid penguins, as well as Cape petrels, snowy sheathbills, kelp gulls, brown skuas, Wilson's storm petrels and Antarctic terns.

== See also ==
- List of Antarctic and sub-Antarctic islands
