= VHX =

Digital distribution platform

VHX Corp.
- Website type: Subsidiary of Vimeo
- Founded: 2011
- Headquarters: New York City, New York State, {{{location_country}}}
- Founders: Jamie Wilkinson; Casey Pugh
- Industry: digital distribution, film distribution, OVP, SVOD
- Employees: 25 (as of July 2015)
- Website: vhx.tv

VHX was a digital distribution platform targeting independent filmmakers. The platform allows artists to sell content directly from their own website, providing design, social media integration, search engine optimization, and analytics tools. In May 2016, VHX was acquired by Vimeo.

== History ==
VHX was founded in 2011, in New York City, by internet researcher Jamie Wilkinson and Casey Pugh as a video sharing community called VHX.tv to discover and watch videos from around the web. It was originally bootstrap funded by the founders for its first year of operation, and in August 2013, it announced a $3.2 million Series A round of financing. It raised a $5 million round led by Comcast Ventures. Investors, who had previously put $3 million into the company, include Union Square Ventures, Lerer Hippeau Ventures and Reddit Chairman Alexis Ohanian. During its beta, it collected over 300 indie films to distribute, which included Sleepwalk with Me, The Act of Killing, and Upstream Color.

After helping Aziz Ansari release his standup special Dangerously Delicious in 2012, VHX shifted its focus to empowering filmmakers to sell their work online.

In June 2013, VHX was named to "The 2013 IndieWire Influencers List". In 2014, it appeared at South by Southwest.

In 2015, VHX had profited $15,000,000, and by that year, had 30,000 subscribers and 10,000 films. In 2016, it was acquired by Vimeo.

== Content ==
VHX provided streaming and DRM-free downloads of premium video content for many different artists and distributors. Some titles that have used VHX for online distribution included:

=== Notable films ===
- March 2012: Dangerously Delicious, Aziz Ansari’s 2011 standup show.
- June 2012: Indie Game: The Movie, a 2012 documentary film about independent game developers by James Swirsky and Lisanne Pajot.
- November 2012: "The Invisible Made Visible", a live episode of This American Life.
- November 2012: Miami Connection, a 1987 martial arts film restored by Drafthouse Films.
- February 2013: Sound City, a 2013 documentary film by Dave Grohl.
- April 2013: Upstream Color, a science fiction film by Shane Carruth.
- January 2014: Life Itself, a 2014 documentary film by Steve James. VHX powered the streaming of the film from Sundance to fans who had supported the Indiegogo campaign.
- February 2014: Camp Takota, a 2014 feature film starring YouTube stars Grace Helbig, Hannah Hart and Mamrie Hart.
- February 2014: Mistaken for Strangers, a 2014 documentary about the indie rock band The National.
- April 2014: Stripped, a 2014 documentary about comic strips artists.
- May 2014: Kevin Spacey's "NOW: In the Wings on a World Stage," a 2014 documentary about theater and William Shakespeare's Richard III.
- June 2014: This American Life: Live at BAM, the second live-acted release by Ira Glass and This American Life.
- July 2014: Restrung, a 2014 documentary about animator Randy Fullmer leaving Disney to go make guitars.
- July 2014: Wish I Was Here, a 2014 feature by Zach Braff funded via Kickstarter used VHX for crowdfunding reward fulfillment worldwide.
- August 2014: Cowspiracy: The Sustainability Secret, a 2014 documentary funded via Kickstarter.
- November 2014: Harmontown, a 2014 documentary about Dan Harmon and his podcast Harmontown after being fired from the TV series he created, Community.
- December 2014: Expelled, a 2014 feature produced by Awesomeness TV starring Vine star Cameron Dallas.
- March 2016: The Watcher Self, a 2016 British psychological thriller film written, produced and directed by Matt Cruse.
- March 2016: Winners Tape All: The Henderson Brothers Story, a mockumentary that pays homage to 1980s regional direct-to-VHS horror filmmakers and the influx of horror VHS collectors, directed by Justin Channell.
- April 2016: Amityville: Vanishing Point, the continuation of the Amityville horror mythos featuring Catie Corcoran and Lloyd Kaufman.

=== Notable series ===
- October 2014: Foo Fighters: Sonic Highways, a TV documentary series created for HBO by Dave Grohl and distributed internationally via VHX during its HBO broadcast window in the United States.
- 2014: Black&Sexy TV, a YouTube channel with multiple web series.
- 2014 MeatEater, a non-fiction TV series with Steven Rinella which broadcasts on the Sportsman Channel and uses VHX to facilitate worldwide online sales.

=== Notable distributors ===
- Comedy Central
- Drafthouse Films
- Dropout
- Devolver Digital
- Kino Lorber
- Oscilloscope Laboratories
- Noize TV
- Telly2Go
- Toku
- Team Locon
- WOW Presents Plus
