= List of ships named HMS Beagle =

Eight vessels of the Royal Navy have been named HMS Beagle, after a dog breed. The most notable of these ships is the second HMS Beagle, 1820–1870, which transported Charles Darwin around the world in the voyage of Beagle.

- HMS Beagle (1804), a Cruizer-class brig-sloop in service from 1804 to 1814.
- HMS Beagle, a 10-gun Cherokee-class brig-sloop, launched in 1820 and converted to a survey ship in 1825. After her famous voyage with Charles Darwin, she became a customs watch vessel in 1846, and was sold in 1870.
- HMS Beagle (1854), an Arrow-class wooden-hulled screw gunvessel launched in 1854 and sold in 1863, eventually becoming the Japanese vessel Kanko
- HMS Beagle (1872), a 1-gun schooner serving in Sydney from 1872 to 1883.
- HMS Beagle (1889), a Beagle-class steel screw sloop, the lead ship of a class of two, in service from 1889 to 1905.
- HMS Beagle (1909), a Beagle-class destroyer, the lead ship of her class, launched in 1909 and sold in 1921.
- HMS Beagle (H30), a B-class destroyer launched in 1930 and broken up in 1946.
- HMS Beagle (A319), a Bulldog-class hydrographic survey ship launched in 1967 and sold in 2002.

Also, in 1766, the Bombay Marine, which was the British East India Company's navy, had a gallivat named Beagle that was armed with eight 3-pounder guns.

== Battle honours ==
Ships named Beagle have earned the following battle honours:

- Basque Roads, 1809
- San Sebastian, 1813
- Crimea, 1854−55
- China, 1856−60
- Dardanelles, 1915−16
- Norway, 1940
- Atlantic, 1940−43, 1945
- North Africa, 1942
- Arctic, 1942−44
- English Channel, 1943
- Normandy, 1944

== See also ==
- Beagle 2, a failed British Mars lander that arrived at Mars in 2003
- Beagle 3, a proposed Mars lander mission to search for life on Mars
