= Bagle =

Bagle may refer to:

- Bagle (computer worm)
- The Bagles

== See also ==
- Bagel (disambiguation)
- Baggle
- Beagle (disambiguation)
