= The Copernicus Legacy =

Book series by Tony Abbott

- Author: Tony Abbott
- Country: United States
- Language: English
- Genre: Adventure, science fiction
- No. of books: 4
- Followed by: 'Copernicus Archives'

The Copernicus Legacy is a book series written by Tony Abbott. It is about the adventures of Wade Kaplan, Darrell Kaplan, Lily, Becca Moore, Roald Kaplan, and Sara Kaplan, as they try to destroy a time machine made by Ptolemy but discovered and used by Nicolaus Copernicus, from the dangerous Teutonic Order of Ancient Prussia. It currently has four books in the main series, but two are in a series diverted from The Copernicus Legacy called Copernicus Archives. While a work of fiction, it does incorporate some facts about Copernicus's history.

== Books ==
- The Forbidden Stone (2014)
- Copernicus Archives: Wade and the Scorpion's Claw (2014)
- The Serpent's Curse (2014)
- Copernicus Archives: Becca and the Prisoner's Cross (2015)
- The Golden Vendetta (2015)
- The Crown of Fire (2016)
