= Tony Abbott (author) =

American author of children's books

- Born: October 26, 1952 (age 73); Cleveland, Ohio, U.S.
- Education: University of Connecticut
- Writing career
- Genre: children's
- Notable work: The Secrets of Droon

Signature
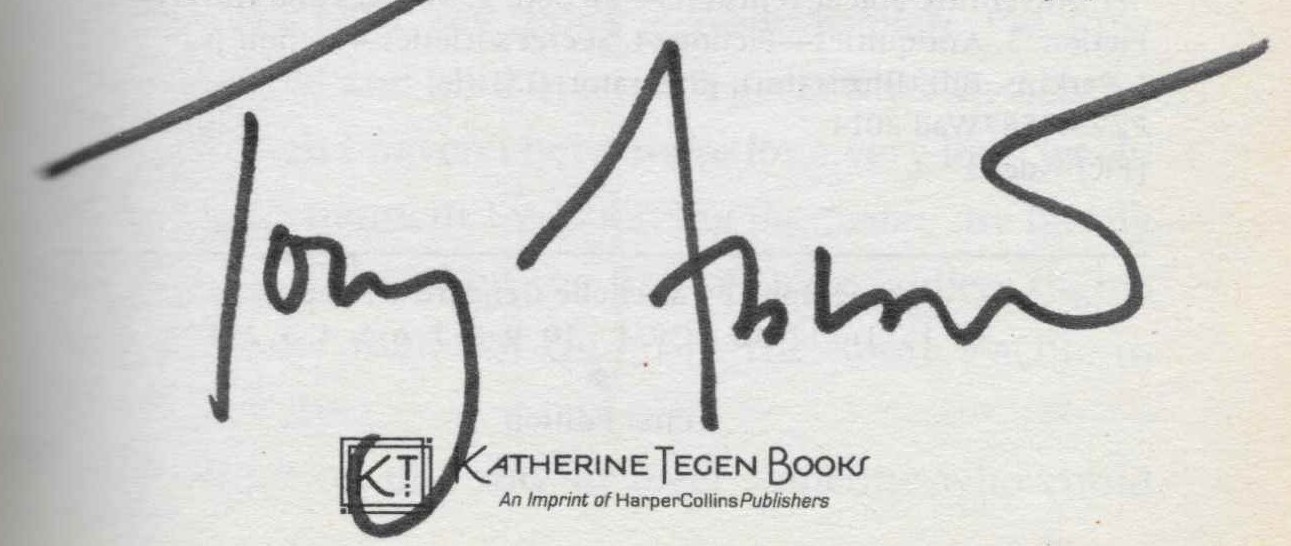

Tony Abbott (born October 26, 1952) is an American author of children's books. His most popular work is the book series The Secrets of Droon, which includes over 40 books. He has sold over 12 million copies of his books and they have been translated into several other languages, including Italian, Spanish, Korean, French, Japanese, Polish, Turkish, and Russian. He has also written Firegirl and The Copernicus Legacy.

== Early life ==
Tony Abbott was born in Cleveland, Ohio, in 1952. His father was a university professor and had an extensive library of books which became one of Abbott's first sources of literature. Abbott had one brother and two sisters. When he was eight years old, Abbott's family moved to Connecticut where he went through elementary school and high school. Abbott attended the University of Connecticut, and after studying both music and psychology, decided to study English. He graduated from the University of Connecticut with a bachelor's degree in English literature and majors in Music and Psychology. After college, he travelled to Europe, returned home, and found work at several bookstores and a publishing company. He attended the workshops of Patricia Reilly Giff to further develop his writing.

== Career ==
While taking writing class from Patricia Reilly Giff and producing several failures, Abbott finally published his book Danger Guys. He is well known for the book series The Secrets of Droon, which includes over 40 books. He has also written the bestseller Firegirl and The Copernicus Legacy series.

== Personal life ==
Abbott currently lives in Trumbull, Connecticut, with his wife and dog. He is a member of the Society of Children's Book Writers and Illustrators, the Yale Center for British Art, and other esteemed arts organizations.

== Bibliography ==
Mr. Abbott has written over ninety-five books including:

=== Danger Guys series ===
- Danger Guys (1994)
- Danger Guys Blast Off (1994)
- Danger Guys: Hollywood Halloween
- Danger Guys Hit the Beach (1995)
- Danger Guys On Ice (1995)
- Danger Guys and the Golden Lizard (1996)

=== The Weird Zone series ===
- Zombie Surf Commandos from Mars! (1996)
- Incredible Shrinking Kids! (1996)
- The Beast From Beneath the Cafeteria! (1996)
- Attack of the Alien Mole Invaders! (1996)
- The Brain that Wouldn't Obey! (1997)
- Gigantopus from Planet X! (1997)
- Cosmic Boy Versus Mezmo Head! (1997)
- Revenge of the Tiki Men! (1997)

=== The Haunting of Derek Stone series ===
- City of the Dead (Scholastic/January 2009)
- Bayou Dogs (Scholastic/March 2009)
- The Red House (Scholastic/June 2009)
- The Ghost Road (Scholastic/September 2009)

=== Secrets of Droon series ===
- The Hidden Stairs and the Magic Carpet (Scholastic/June 1999)
- Journey to the Volcano Palace (Scholastic/June 1999)
- The Mysterious Island (Scholastic/August 1999)
- City of the Clouds (Scholastic/October 1999)
- The Great Ice Battle (Scholastic/December 1999)
- The Sleeping Giant of Goll (Scholastic/February 2000)
- Into the Land of the Lost(Scholastic/April 2000)
- The Golden Wasp (Scholastic/June 2000)
- The Tower of the Elf King (Scholastic/August 2000)
- Quest For the Queen (Scholastic/November 2000)
- The Hawk Bandits of Tarkoom (Scholastic/February 2001)
- Under the Serpent Sea (Scholastic/May 2001)
- The Mask of Maliban (Scholastic/October 2001)
- Voyage of the Jaffa Wind (Scholastic/February 2002)
- The Moon Scroll (Scholastic/May 2002)
- The Knights of Silversnow (Scholastic/August 2002)
- Dream Thief (Scholastic/February 2003)
- Search for the Dragon Ship (Scholastic/May 2003)
- The Coiled Viper (Scholastic/July 2003)
- In the Ice Caves of Krog (Scholastic/October 2003)
- Flight of the Genie (Scholastic/January 2004)
- The Isle of Mists (Scholastic/July 2004)
- The Fortress of the Treasure Queen (Scholastic/October 2004)
- The Race to Doobesh (Scholastic/January 2005)
- The Riddle of Zorfendorf Castle (Scholastic/April 2005)
- The Moon Dragon (Scholastic/January 2006)
- The Chariot of Queen Zara (Scholastic/April 2006)
- In The Shadow of Goll (Scholastic/July 2006)
- Pirates of the Purple Dawn (Scholastic/February 2007)
- Escape from Jabar-Loo (Scholastic/June 2007)
- Queen of Shadowthorne (Scholastic/October 2007)
- The Treasure of the Orkins (Scholastic/June 2008)
- Flight of the Blue Serpent (Scholastic/October 2008)
- In the City of Dreams (Scholastic/February 2009)
- The Lost Empire of Koomba (Scholastic/October 2009)
- Knights of the Ruby Wand (Scholastic/February 2010)

==== Special editions ====
- The Magic Escapes (Scholastic/November 2002)
- Wizard or Witch (Scholastic/March 2004)
- Voyagers of the Silver Sand (Scholastic/July 2005)
- Sorcerer (Scholastic/September 2006)
- Moon Magic (Scholastic/February 2008)
- Crown of Wizards (Scholastic/May 2009)
- The Genie King (Scholastic/June 2010)
- The Final Quest (Scholastic/October 2010)

=== Non-series works ===
- Kringle (2005)
- Firegirl (2008)
- The Postcard (2009)
- Lunch-box Dream (2011)
- The Summer of Owen Todd (2017)
- Denis Ever After (2018)
- The Great Jeff (2019)
- Junk Boy (2020)

=== UnderWorlds Series ===
- The Battle Begins (Scholastic 2011/Amazon 2012)
- When Monsters Escape (Scholastic 2012/Amazon 2012)
- Revenge of the Scorpion King (Scholastic/August 2012)
- The Ice Dragon (Scholastic/December 2012)

=== The Copernicus Legacy ===
- The Forbidden Stone
- Copernicus Archives: Wade and the Scorpion's Claw
- The Serpent's Curse
- Becca and the Prisoner's Cross
- The Golden Vendetta
- The Crown of Fire

He also has written the Cracked Classics series, a set of books that narrate classics in a modern way

== Awards ==
- Golden Kite Award for Fiction presented by the Society of Children's Book Writers and Illustrators for his book Firegirl.
- Mystery Writers of America's Edgar Allan Poe Award for best mystery in the juvenile category for his book The Postcard (in 2009)
