= Kringle (novel) =

2005 book by Tony Abbott

- Author: Tony Abbott
- Illustrator: Greg Call
- Country: United States
- Language: English
- Genre: Children's novel; Christmas stories; Fantasy novel
- Publisher: Scholastic (US)
- Published: October 23, 2005
- Media type: Print (hardcover and paperback)

Kringle is an American children's novel by author Tony Abbott. The story chronicles the origins of Kris Kringle, also known as Santa Claus. The book was released in 2005.

== Summary ==
Unlike the traditional Santa Claus myth, Kringle is a coming-of-age story about an orphan who becomes a force for good in a dark and violent time. It is a tale of fantasy, of goblins, elves, and flying reindeer — and of a boy from the humblest beginnings who fulfills his destiny. Our tale begins in 500 A.D., when goblins kidnapped human children and set them to work in underground mines. Kringle is one such child.... until he discovers his mission — to free children from enslavement. His legend lives on today, as he travels the earth every Christmas Eve to quell the goblins once more.

== Reception ==
Kringle has been called "deft writing" and "a credible blend of Anglo-Saxon legend and Christian myth". Booklist wrote "On first glance, this story of how Kris Kringle came to live at the North Pole, surrounded by toy-making elves, sounds like the premise for a lighthearted cartoon. It is anything but. ... Told in a come-nearer voice, this epic could have used some tightening, but the enticing premise, appealing young hero, and nonstop action will appeal to many fantasy lovers."

== Film adaptation ==
In 2007, Paramount Pictures optioned the film rights. The idea was pitched by film director Mark Dindal based on a script written by Dindal and Jason Richman, with Lorenzo di Bonaventura producing and Dindal directing. As of September 2017, no new updates have been announced regarding the status of the production.
