= Danger Guys Series =

Children's book series by Tony Abbott

Danger Guys is a series of children's books written by Tony Abbott and illustrated by Joanne Scribner. The series is about two children, Noodle and Zeek, who always seem to find themselves in danger.

== Series ==
There are six books in the series.

- Danger Guys (1994)
- Danger Guys Blast Off
- Danger Guys: Hollywood Halloween (illustrated by Suwin Chan)
- Danger Guys Hit the Beach
- Danger Guys On Ice
- Danger Guys and the Golden Lizard

== Plot summaries of the books ==
=== Danger Guys ===
Noodle and Zeek are excited about an adventure store opening in the local mall.

Once at the mall, they come face to face with two big guys who are unloading things from the back of a truck. Noodle and Zeek get in the truck to look at the stuff the guys are unloading, but the door closes behind them and the truck drives away. Later, the truck slows down, its doors fly open and Zeek is thrown out. Noodle jumps out to find him and once together they realise they are underground.

They walk a little while and come to a huge opening. They see a temple which the two big guys are looting and have also kidnapped two explorers. Noodle and Zeek manage to outsmart the baddies and free the couple (but not before getting chased by a huge stone a la Indiana Jones).
