= Chicken Little (2005 film) =

Disney animated film

- Theatrical release poster
- Directed by: Mark Dindal
- Screenplay by: Steve Bencich; Ron J. Friedman; Ron Anderson
- Story by: Mark Dindal; Mark Kennedy
- Based on: "Henny Penny"
- Produced by: Randy Fullmer
- Starring: Zach Braff; Joan Cusack; Dan Molina; Steve Zahn; Garry Marshall; Amy Sedaris; Mark Walton; Don Knotts
- Edited by: Dan Molina
- Music by: John Debney
- Production company: Walt Disney Feature Animation
- Distributed by: Buena Vista Pictures Distribution (Note: Distributed under the Walt Disney Pictures banner.)
- Release dates: October 30, 2005 (El Capitan Theatre); November 4, 2005 (United States)
- Running time: 81 minutes
- Country: United States
- Language: English
- Budget: $150 million
- Box office: $314.4 million

Chicken Little is a 2005 American animated science fiction comedy film produced by Walt Disney Feature Animation. It is loosely inspired by the European folk tale "Henny Penny", known in the United States as "Chicken Little". Disney had previously adapted the tale in a 1943 short film. The film follows Chicken Little who, after claiming the sky was "falling" and subsequently being ridiculed by his town, attempts to fix his reputation, only to discover an otherworldly revelation.

The film was directed by Mark Dindal and written by Steve Bencich, Ron J. Friedman, and Ron Anderson, and features Zach Braff as Chicken Little, with Joan Cusack, Dan Molina, Steve Zahn, Garry Marshall, Amy Sedaris, Mark Walton, and Don Knotts in supporting roles.

Chicken Little was animated in-house at Walt Disney Feature Animation's main headquarters in Burbank, California. It was Disney Animation's first fully computer-animated feature film.

Chicken Little premiered at the El Capitan Theatre in Hollywood on October 30, 2005, and was released in the United States on November 4, by Walt Disney Pictures. It was the first mainstream theatrical release in Digital 3-D, with around 100 theaters worldwide fitted with new 3-D projectors to screen the film. The film received mixed reviews from critics and grossed $314 million, becoming the second-highest-grossing animated film of 2005.

== Plot ==
In the town of Oakey Oaks, "Chicken Little" Cluck rings the school bell and warns everyone to run for their lives. This sends the town into a panic. Eventually, the Head of the Fire Department calms him down enough to ask him what is going on. He explains that the sky is falling because a piece of it had fallen on his head when he was sitting under the big oak tree in the town square; however, he cannot find the piece. His widowed father, Buck "Ace" Cluck, who was once a high school baseball star, assumes that it was just an acorn that had fallen off the tree and had hit him on the head, making Chicken Little the laughingstock of the town.

A year later, Chicken Little has become infamous in the town for being prone to ruin everything accidentally. His only friends are other outcasts: Abby Mallard (nicknamed "The Ugly Duckling"), Runt (an enormous, but cowardly pig), and Fish Out of Water (who wears a helmet full of tap water to breathe). Chicken Little joins his school's baseball team to recover his reputation and his father's pride but is made last until the ninth inning of the last game. He hits the ball and makes it past first, second, and third bases but is met at home plate by the outfielders. He tries sliding onto the home plate but is touched by the ball. While it is presumed he lost the game, the umpire brushes away the dust to reveal Chicken Little's foot is touching home plate, thus declaring him safe and the game won; Chicken Little is hailed as a hero for winning the pennant.

Later that night back at home, Chicken Little is hit on the head yet again by the same "piece of the sky" — only to find out that it is actually a mysterious panel that blends into the background (which would thereby explain why he could not find it the first time). He calls his friends over to help figure out what it is.

When Fish pushes a button on the back of the hexagon, it flies into the sky, taking him with it. It turns out to be part of the camouflage of an invisible UFO piloted by two armored aliens. Chicken Little, Abby and Runt rescue Fish, and discover that the aliens are heading to Earth. The aliens soon attack the group, chasing them through a cornfield. They rush back to the school, where Chicken Little rings the bell to warn everyone, but the aliens escape, leaving an orange alien child behind. No one believes the story of the alien invasion and Chicken Little's reputation is ruined again. The next morning, he and his friends discover the orange alien named Kirby, and minutes later, a fleet of alien ships descend on the town and start what appears to be an invasion. The invasion, however, is actually a misunderstanding, as the two aliens are looking for their lost child and attack only out of concern. As the aliens rampage throughout Oakey Oaks, supposedly vaporizing everything in their path, Chicken Little realizes he must return Kirby to his parents to save the planet.

In the invasion, Buck, having regained his pride and trust in his son, defends him from the aliens until they get "vaporized." The aliens, however, are not actually vaporizing people but teleporting them aboard the UFO. It turns out the aliens were touring Earth and came across the town for its acorns. Their ship has a broken camo panel that fell and hit Chicken Little on the head twice before. After everything is explained, the apologetic aliens return everything to normal before departing to space with Kirby, and everyone is grateful for Chicken Little's efforts to save the town.

Another year later, Chicken Little, Buck, his friends and the citizens of Oakey Oaks watch an in-universe movie depicting a fanciful retelling of the events that transpired, portraying Chicken Little as an action hero also named "Ace".

== Voice cast ==
- Zach Braff as "Chicken Little" Cluck, a young and diminutive rooster, who suffers from a reputation for being called crazy after causing a panic when he thought that the sky was falling.
- Joan Cusack as Abigail "Abby" Mallard (also known as the Ugly Duckling), a female duck (implied swan) with buck teeth. She is Chicken Little's best friend, and by the end, his girlfriend.
- Dan Molina as Fish Out of Water, a goldfish who wears a scuba helmet filled with water and lives on the surface.
- Steve Zahn as Runt of the Litter, a large pig who is much larger than the other children but is far smaller than the other members of his family.
- Garry Marshall as Buck "Ace" Cluck, Chicken Little's widower father and a former high school baseball star.
  - Mark Mitchell would later voice the character in the Australian release.
- Amy Sedaris as Foxy Loxy, a mean fox who is a baseball star and the "hometown hero". She is also a tomboy and one of the "popular kids" at school. In the original fable, as well as the 1943 short film, Foxy is a male fox.
- Mark Walton as Goosey Loosey, a dimwitted goose and Foxy Loxy's best friend and henchwoman.
- Don Knotts as Turkey Lurkey, a turkey and the mayor of Oakey Oaks, who is friendly and sensible but not very bright.
- Sean Elmore, Matthew Josten, and Evan Dunn as Kirby
- Fred Willard as Melvin
- Catherine O'Hara as Tina
- Mark Dindal as Morkubine Porcupine and the Coach
- Patrick Stewart as Mr. Woolensworth
- Wallace Shawn as Principal Fetchit
- Patrick Warburton as Alien Cop
- Adam West as Ace - Hollywood Chicken Little
- Harry Shearer as Don Bowowser

== Production ==
=== Writing ===
In September 2001, after the release of The Emperor's New Groove, director Mark Dindal and producer Randy Fullmer began to work on their next project for Disney, and came up with the idea for Chicken Little, with its title character envisioned as a paranoid female chicken with the voice of Holly Hunter that went to summer camp to reduce her anxiety, as well as repair her relationship with her father. At the summer camp, she would uncover a nefarious plot that her camp counselor, who was to be voiced by Penn Jillette, was planning against her hometown. "I have two daughters, so I immediately went to a father/daughter story," Dindal said. Dindal would later pitch his idea to former Disney Chairman and CEO Michael Eisner who demanded that Chicken Little be changed into a male because as Dindal recalled, "if you're a boy and you're short, you get picked on." However, Dindal later clarified that the decision was made, in part, due to market research stating, "I remember being told, 'Girls will go see a movie with a boy protagonist but boys won't see a movie with a girl protagonist, [...] That was the wisdom at the time, until Frozen comes out and makes $1 billion."

Despite initial reluctance, the team eventually agreed and made the gender swap. “After we switched it to a boy he seemed much happier with that choice and that direction,” Dindal said.

In January 2003, Thomas Schumacher resigned as president of Walt Disney Feature Animation and was replaced by David Stainton. However, Stainton’s first day at the studio also coincided with a test screening for Eisner.

Following the aforementioned test screening, Stainton was unimpressed with the original story and decided it needed a different approach.

Stainton said: "I was sitting there at the screening room watching it and I thought: 'Oh my God! What am I going to do?"' "This is the movie that's working? I honestly almost started to cry."

He told Dindal the script had to be revised, and during the next three months, it was rewritten into a tale of a boy trying to save his town from space aliens. Dindal also went back to a very early version of the story, which focused on Chicken Little and a group of misfit animals who lived on a farm in the middle of the country. On the weekend of the country fair, the prize animals went off to win their ribbons while the reject animals stayed behind. “Aliens touched down in that remote area to begin their conquest of earth and she and the other animals thwart that. And there was no evidence. Since it happened in a remote location, the world would never know.”

He combined the science fiction concept from this early idea with some of the characters from the summer camp story, into a new concept.

During the rewriting process, Dindal, along with three credited writers and nine others, threw out twenty-five scenes to improve the character development and add more emotional resonance with the parent-child relationship. Dindal stated that "It took us about 2½ years to pretty much get back to where we started... But in the course of that, the story got stronger, more emotional, and Amazing, too."

=== Casting ===
When originally envisioned as a female character, Holly Hunter provided the voice for the title character for eight months, until it was decided for Chicken Little to be a male. Michael J. Fox, Dave Foley, D.B. Sweeney, Ben Stiller, Matt Damon, Leonardo DiCaprio, Shia LaBeouf, Steve Martin, Jon Heder, Matthew Broderick, Jason Lee, Jack Black, Paul Walker, Robin Williams, James Marsden, Nathan Lane, Drake Bell, Josh Peck, Keanu Reeves and David Spade were all originally considered for the role. Against forty actors competing for the title role, Zach Braff auditioned. Dindal noted he "pitched his voice slightly to sound like a junior high kid. Right there, that was really unique — and then he had such great energy."

In April 2002, Variety reported that Sean Hayes was to voice a character named the Ugly Duckling, but the character was rewritten into a female. Now conceived as Abby Mallard, Jamie Donnelly, Jamie Lee Curtis, Sarah Jessica Parker, Jodie Foster, Laura Dern, Helen Hunt, Geena Davis, and Madonna were considered, but Joan Cusack (who had previously worked with Disney in Toy Story 2) won the role for her natural comedy. In December 2003, it was announced Braff and Cusack were cast, along with other cast members including Steve Zahn as Runt of the Litter, Dan Molina as Fish Out of Water, Amy Sedaris as Foxy Loxy, Don Knotts as Turkey Lurkey, Katie Finneran as Goosey Loosey, and Garry Marshall as Buck Cluck.

Halfway through production, however, Finneran ultimately left the project and was replaced by Disney storyboard artist Mark Walton.

Marshall was asked to provide a voice for Kingdom of the Sun, which was re-conceived into The Emperor's New Groove and directed by Dindal, but was removed from the project for being "too New York". When he was approached to provide the voice for Buck Cluck, Marshall claimed "I said I don't do voices. You want a chicken that talks like me, fine. So they hired me and they didn't fire me, and it was like a closure on animation.". Before Marshall was cast, James Earl Jones, Bill Murray, Stephen Colbert, Christian Slater, Martin Sheen, Peter Falk, Dennis Hopper, James Woods, Dan Aykroyd, Mick Jagger, and Willem Dafoe were previously considered for the role of Buck Cluck.

Australian comedian Mark Mitchell was hired to dub the voice of Buck Cluck for the Australian release of the film, as a decision by Disney to get a national celebrity to publicize the film.

Similarly, before Steve Zahn was cast as Runt of the Litter, Danny Cooksey, Jim Carrey, Jeff Bennett, Nicolas Cage, Brendan Fraser, Brad Garrett, and John Goodman were previously considered for the role.

This also marked the final film appearance of Knotts during his lifetime.

=== Animation ===
To visualize this story, Disney selected 50 percent of its 2D animation staff to put them in a CGI animation team, and placed them through a rigorous eighteen-month training program with George Lucas' Industrial Light and Magic, which included an introductory to Alias's Maya that would serve as the main 3D animation software used on the project. This was due to Disney CEO Michael Eisner announcing that the studio would move to computer animation in response to a downturn caused by rising competition from Pixar and DreamWorks Animation computer animated features, as well as the unsatisfactory box office performances of The Emperor's New Groove, Atlantis: The Lost Empire, Treasure Planet (2002), and Home on the Range (2004). As some of the animators had worked on Dinosaur (2000), which used live-action backgrounds, the animation team took inspiration for its staging, coloring, and theatrical lighting from Mary Blair's background designs featured in Alice in Wonderland (1951) and Peter Pan (1953).

For the aesthetics in the background designs, the background layout artists sparingly use digital matte paintings to render out the naturalistic elements, including the trees and the baseball diamond, but they were retouched using Adobe Photoshop as background cards featured in the film. The lighting department would utilize the "Lumiere" software to enhance virtual lighting for the shading form and depth and geometric rendering for the characters' shadows, as well as use real lighting to create cucoloris.

For the characters' designs and animation style, Dindal sought to capture the "roundness" as seen in the Disney animated works from the 1940s to 1950s, by which the characters' fluidity of motion was inspired from the Goofy cartoon How to Play Baseball (1942). Under visual effects supervisor Steve Goldberg who spearheaded the department, the Maya software included the software program "Shelf Control" that provided an outline of characters that can be viewed on-screen and provided a direct link to the controls for specific autonomy, as well as new electronic tablet screens were produced that allowed for the artists to draw digital sketches of the characters to rough out their movements, which was then transferred to the 3D characters.

All of the characters were constructed using geometric polygons. For the title character, there were approximately fourteen to fifteen character designs before settling the design composed of an ovular egghead shape with oversized glasses. The final character was constructed of 5,600 polygons, 700 muscles, and more than 76,000 individual feathers, of which 55,000 are placed on his head.

Following the casting of Braff, supervising animator Jason Ryan adapted Braff's facial features during recording sessions to better combine the dorkiness and adorability the filmmakers desired. "He's got this really appealing face and eye expressions," Ryan said, adding that he was amazed by Braff's natural vocal abilities. Next, the animators would utilize the software program "Chicken Wire", where digital wire deformers were provided for the animators to manipulate the basic geometric shapes to get their desired facial features. Lastly, a software development team constructed XGen, a computer software program for grooming fur, feathers, and generating leaves.

== Release ==
The film was originally scheduled for release on July 1, 2005, but on December 7, 2004, its release date was pushed back to November 4, 2005, the release date that was originally slated for Disney/Pixar's Cars. The release date change was also the day before DreamWorks Animation changed the release date of Shrek the Third, from November 2006 to May 2007. Cars was later released on June 9, 2006.

At the time of the release of Chicken Little, the co-production deal between Disney and Pixar was set to expire with the release of Cars in 2006. The result of the contentious negotiations between Disney and Pixar was viewed to depend heavily on how Chicken Little performed at the box office. If successful, the film would have given Disney leverage in its negotiations for a new contract to distribute Pixar's films. A failure would have allowed Pixar to argue that Disney could not produce CGI films.

On October 30, 2005, the film premiered at the El Capitan Theatre, with the cast and filmmakers as attendees, which was followed with a ballroom bash at the Hollywood and Highland Center. Along with its standard theatrical release, the film was the first Disney in-house release to be rendered in Disney Digital 3D, that was produced by Industrial Light & Magic, and exhibited via Dolby Digital Cinema servers at approximately 100 selected theaters in twenty five top markets. To describe the process, Dindal remembers that it was a last minute decision, as it was suggested just 11 months before its release. For the 3D conversion, Dindal had a specific way he wanted the film to look: he wanted it to feel like a moving View-Master. As he puts it,

"When I was a kid, and I was really taken with something, my first thought was, Oh, I want to step into that… They felt like a window that you could step in. I remember showing those and saying, 'Can you make it look like this? What is it about this that feels more 3D than most 3D films film like that?'"

The film was dedicated to Disney artist and writer Joe Grant, who died before the film's release.

=== Marketing ===
The first trailer was released online in early 2004. It was also attached to the DVD release of Brother Bear. Accompanied with the theatrical release, Disney Consumer Products released a series of plush items, toys, activity sets, keepsakes, and apparel.

=== Home media ===
Chicken Little was first released on DVD on March 21, 2006, in a single disc edition. The DVD contained the film accompanied with deleted scenes, three alternate openings, a 6 part making-of featurette, an interactive game, a karaoke sing along, two music videos, and animation test footage of the female Chicken Little. The DVD sold over 2.7 million DVD units during its first week accumulating $48 million in consumer spending. Overall, consumer spending on its initial home video release grossed $142.6 million. The film was released for the first time on Blu-ray on March 20, 2007, and contained new features not included on the DVD. A 3D Blu-ray version was released on November 8, 2011.

A VHS version was also released as a Disney Movie Club exclusive, presented in a rare fullscreen aspect ratio.

== Reception ==
=== Box office ===
In its opening weekend, Chicken Little grossed $40 million and beat out Jarhead and Saw II to rank #1, being the first Disney animated film to do so since Dinosaur. It also managed to earn $31.7 million and claim #1 again in its second week of release, beating Sony's sci-fi family film, Zathura, as well as Derailed and Get Rich or Die Tryin'. The film grossed $135.4 million in North America, and $179 million in other countries, for a worldwide total of $314.4 million.

This reversed the slump that the company had been facing since 2000, during which time it released several films that underperformed, most notably Fantasia 2000 (1999), Atlantis: The Lost Empire (2001), Treasure Planet (2002), and Home on the Range (2004).

=== Critical response ===
Rotten Tomatoes, reports that 37% of 164 surveyed critics gave positive reviews; the average score is 5.4/10. The critical consensus states: "Disney expends more effort in the technical presentation than in crafting an original storyline." Metacritic, gave the film an average score of 48 based on 32 critics, indicating "mixed or average" reviews. Audiences polled by CinemaScore gave the film an average grade of "A−" on an A+ to F scale.

James Berardinelli, writing his review for ReelViews, gave the film two-and-a-half stars out of four stating that "It is bogged down by many of the problems that have plagued Disney's recent traditional animated features: anonymous voice work, poor plot structure, and the mistaken belief that the Disney brand will elevate anything to a 'must-see' level for viewers starved for family-friendly fare." On the syndicated television program Ebert & Roeper, critics Richard Roeper and Roger Ebert gave the film "Two Thumbs Down" with the former saying "I don't care whether the film is 2-D, 3-D, CGI, or hand-drawn, it all goes back to the story."

In his print review featured in the Chicago Sun-Times, Roger Ebert stated the problem was the story and wrote, "As a general rule, if a movie is not about baseball or space aliens, and you have to use them, anyway, you should have started with a better premise." Ebert concluded his review with, "The movie did make me smile. It didn't make me laugh, and it didn't involve my emotions, or the higher regions of my intellect, for that matter. It's a perfectly acceptable feature cartoon for kids up to a certain age, but it doesn't have the universal appeal of some of the best recent animation."

Writing in The New York Times, film critic A.O. Scott stated the film is "a hectic, uninspired pastiche of catchphrases and clichés, with very little wit, inspiration or originality to bring its frantically moving images to genuine life." Entertainment Weekly film reviewer Lisa Schwarzbaum, who graded the film a C, wrote that the "banality of the acorns dropped in this particular endeavor, another in a new breed of mass-market comedy that substitutes self-reference for original wit and pop songs for emotional content."

However, Ty Burr of The Boston Globe gave the film a positive review saying the film was "shiny and peppy, with some solid laughs and dandy vocal performances". Olly Richards of Empire gave the film a three out of five stars, saying, "Beyond a cheeky, twisty bit of genre-tinkering, there's more here for the under-tens than over-, but it's still charming, amusing and energetic enough to win you over."

Angel Cohn of TV Guide gave the film three stars alluding the film that would "delight younger children with its bright colors and constant chaos, while adults are likely to be charmed by the witty banter, subtle one-liners, and a sweet father-son relationship." Peter Rainer, writing in The Christian Science Monitor, graded the film with an A− applauding that the "visuals are irrepressibly witty and so is the script, which morphs from the classic fable into a spoof on War of the Worlds. I prefer this version to Spielberg's."

Plugged In wrote, "A postscript for parents: A single "mistake" defines Chicken Little, and he spends "the rest of his life" trying to live it down. As he puts it, "One moment destroyed my life." Later, another single moment—his home run—redefines him as a hero to his friends and his dad, who says, "I guess that puts the whole 'sky is falling' incident behind us once and for all." Insecure (and observant) young viewers may latch on to this kind of oversimplification and use it as license to magnify the significance of their own bumblings, whatever they might be." Common Sense Media gave the film a three out of five stars, writing, "Cute, sometimes-frantic movie has peril, potential scares."

In 2020, Dindal expressed regret over the final version of the film:

I think, Oh that [early] version ...Then I'm reconnected with what I'm thinking at the time. And you're thinking how that version would have turned out. If we had stuck with that instead of this. If we had pushed Eisner and said, It has to be a girl,' it could have been killed... With this, I wish I could see an alternate reality, what that would have been like.

=== Accolades ===
At the 2005 Stinkers Bad Movie Awards, this film won the award for Worst Animated Film. At the 33rd Annie Awards, it received four nominations for Best Animated Feature, Best Animated Effects, Best Character Design, and Best Production Design, losing all to Wallace & Gromit: The Curse of the Were-Rabbit. At the 2006 Kids' Choice Awards, it was nominated for Favorite Animated Movie, but lost to Madagascar.

| Award | Date of Ceremony | Category | Recipients | Results | Ref. |
|---|---|---|---|---|---|
| Critics' Choice Awards | January 9, 2006 | Best Animated Feature | Mark Dindal | Nominated | |
| Producers Guild of America Awards | January 22, 2006 | Producer of the Year Award in Animated Theatrical Motion Pictures | Randy Fullmer | Nominated | |
| Annie Awards | February 4, 2006 | Best Animated Feature | Randy Fullmer | Nominated | |
| Annie Awards | February 4, 2006 | Best Animated Effects - Feature | Dale Mayeda | Nominated | |
| Annie Awards | February 4, 2006 | Best Character Design - Feature | Joe Moshier | Nominated | |
| Annie Awards | February 4, 2006 | Best Production Design - Feature | Ian Gooding, Dan Cooper, David Womersley, Mac George | Nominated | |
| Stinkers Bad Movie Awards | March 3, 2006 | Worst Animated Film | Chicken Little (Disney) | Won | |
| Kids' Choice Awards | April 1, 2006 | Favorite Animated Movie | Chicken Little (Disney) | Nominated | |

== Soundtrack ==
Chicken Little

Soundtrack album by Various artists
- Released: November 1, 2005
- Recorded: 2004–2005
- Genres: Pop; pop rock; R&B; film score; soft rock
- Length: 39:05
- Label: Walt Disney
- Producer: John Debney

The soundtrack album contains an original score composed and produced by John Debney, who had previously worked with Dindal on The Emperor's New Groove (2000), with music by a wide range of artists, some musical veterans, such as Patti LaBelle and Diana Ross, as well as others. Uniquely for a Disney animated film, several of the songs are covers of classic popular songs, such as Elton John's "Don't Go Breaking My Heart", Carole King's "It's Too Late", and the Spice Girls' signature hit "Wannabe". However, the film does include one original song, "One Little Slip" by Barenaked Ladies. The soundtrack was released on November 1, 2005, by Walt Disney Records.

Track listing
| No. | Title | Artist | Length |
|---|---|---|---|
| 1. | "Stir It Up" | Joss Stone and Patti LaBelle | 3:42 |
| 2. | "One Little Slip" | Barenaked Ladies | 2:53 |
| 3. | "Shake a Tail Feather" | The Cheetah Girls | 3:05 |
| 4. | "All I Know" | Five for Fighting | 3:25 |
| 5. | "Ain't No Mountain High Enough" | Diana Ross | 3:28 |
| 6. | "It's the End of the World as We Know It (And I Feel Fine)" | R.E.M. | 4:04 |
| 7. | "We Are the Champions" | Zach Braff | 0:38 |
| 8. | "Wannabe" | Joan Cusack and Steve Zahn | 0:50 |
| 9. | "Don't Go Breaking My Heart" | The Chicken Little Cast | 1:53 |
| 10. | "The Sky is Falling" (score) | John Debney | 2:49 |
| 11. | "The Big Game" (score) | John Debney | 4:04 |
| 12. | "Dad Apologizes" (score) | John Debney | 3:14 |
| 13. | "Chase to Cornfield" (score) | John Debney | 2:00 |
| 14. | "Dodgeball" (score) | John Debney | 1:15 |
| 15. | "Driving with Dad" (score) | John Debney | 1:45 |
| Total length: | | | 39:05 |

== Video games ==
Chicken Little spawned two video games. The first, Chicken Little, is an action-adventure game released for Xbox on October 18, 2005, by Buena Vista Games. Two days later it was released for PlayStation 2, GameCube and Game Boy Advance (October 20, 2005), and later Microsoft Windows (November 2, 2005). Chicken Little for Game Boy Advance was developed by A2M, while BVG's recently acquired development studio, Avalanche Software, developed the game for the consoles.

The second video game, Disney's Chicken Little: Ace in Action, is a multi-platform video game, for the Wii, Nintendo DS, Microsoft Windows, and PlayStation 2 inspired by the "superhero movie within the movie" finale of the film. It features Ace, the superhero alter ego of Chicken Little, and the Hollywood versions of his misfit band of friends: Runt, Abby, and Fish-Out-of-Water.

Chicken Little appears as a summon in the video game Kingdom Hearts II. Kingdom Hearts II debuted before the film's release in Japan, with the character's inclusion serving as a promotion for the then-upcoming movie.

== Cancelled franchise ==
Disneytoon Studios originally planned to make a direct-to-video sequel to Chicken Little, tentatively titled Chicken Little 2: The Ugly Duckling Story. Directed by Klay Hall, the story would have involved Chicken Little getting into a love triangle between Abby Mallard and a beautiful newcomer, Raffaela, a French sheep. Being at a great disadvantage, Abby would go to great lengths to give herself a makeover. According to Tod Carter, a story artist on the film, early screenings of the story reel were very well-received, prompting Disney to consider increasing the production budget to match the quality of the story. Soon after 2006, when John Lasseter became Walt Disney Animation Studios' new chief creative officer, he cancelled all sequels that were in development at Disneytoon, including Chicken Little 2, Meet the Robinsons 2: First Date and a sequel to The Aristocats, and ordered the studio to shift its focus towards spin-off films and original productions. According to Carter, this was a reaction to the sales figures for current projects and the overall market, adding: "The executives didn't feel that the original film had a wide enough market to draw upon to support the sequel."

Walt Disney Television Animation was also developing an animated series based on the film for Disney Channel. The project was passed in favor of Phineas and Ferb according to Dan Povenmire. An animation test for the series was found in 2024.

== See also ==
- List of films featuring fictional films
