= Beagle (crater) =

Crater on Mars

Martian crater Beagle
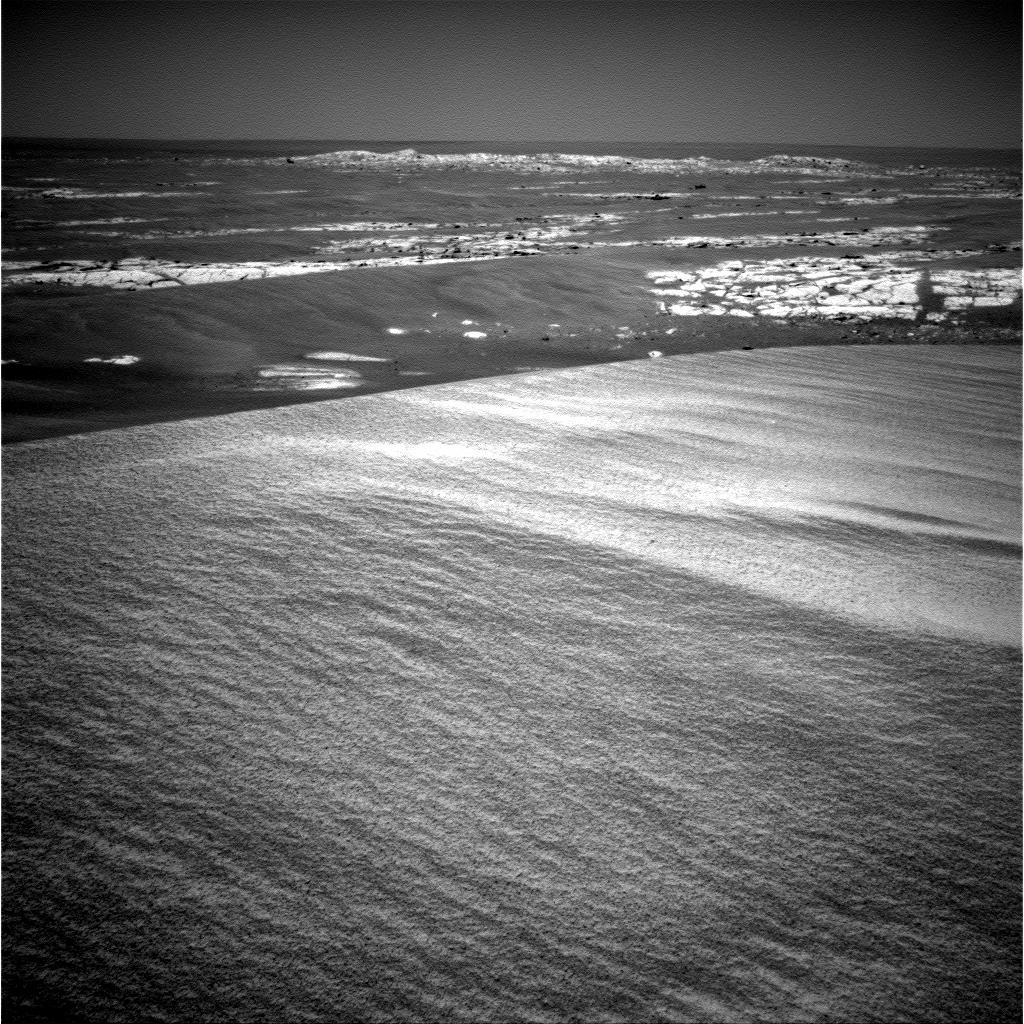
- Planet: Mars
- Region: Meridiani Planum
- Coordinates: 2.1°S 5.5°W
- Quadrangle: Margaritifer Sinus
- Diameter: 35 m
- Depth: Approx. 1-2 meters
- Discoverer: Opportunity rover
- Eponym: HMA Beagle and Beagle 2

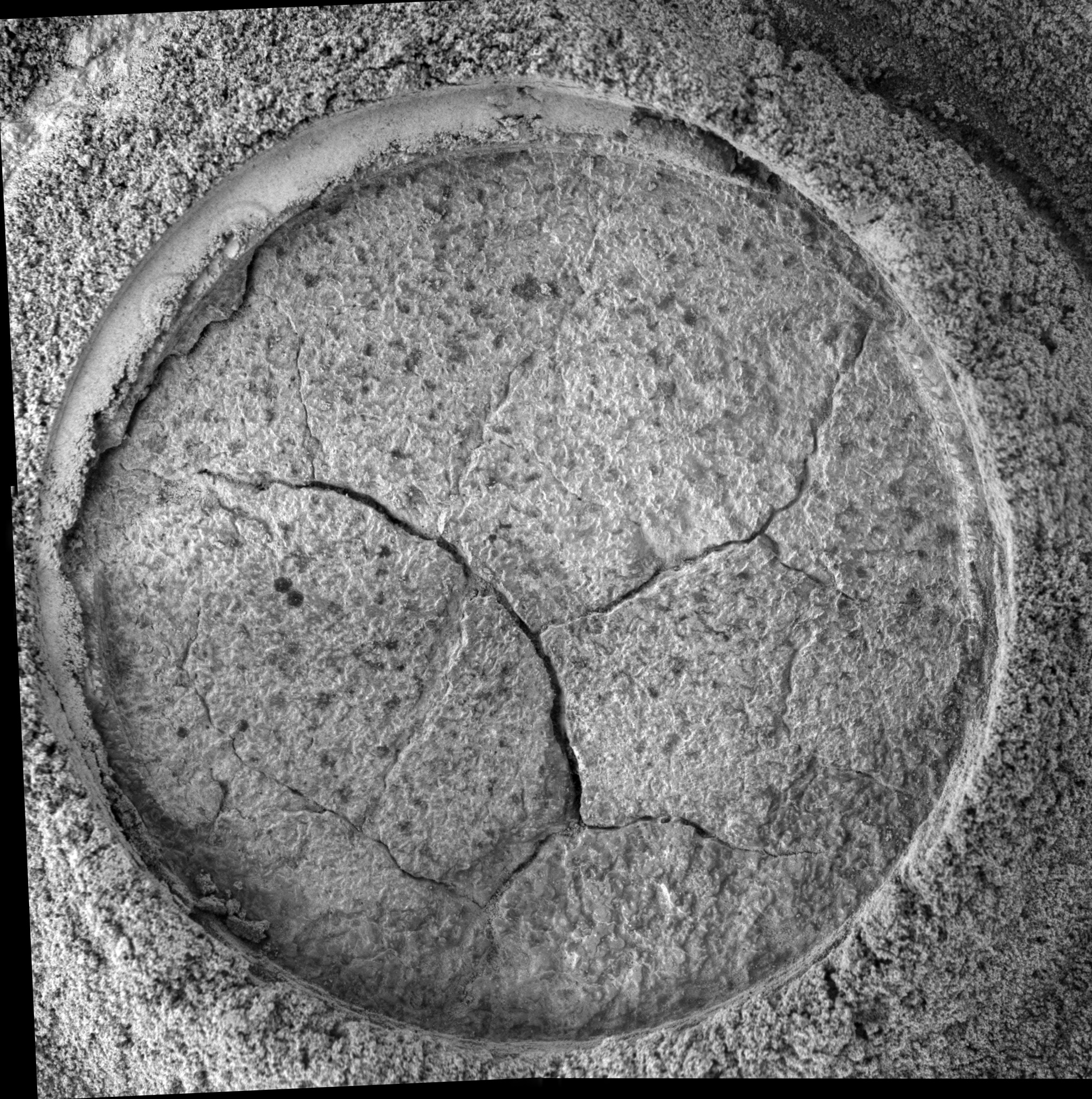
Rock target Baltra from Beagle crater examined by MER-B. (The rock has been ground down by the rover's tool)

Beagle is a crater lying within the Margaritifer Sinus quadrangle (MC-19) portion of the planet Mars, the crater is one of multiple topographical depressions within the Meridiani Planum extraterrestrial plain, which was explored by the Opportunity rover. It was located by the rover in images taken on sol 855 (June 20, 2006), 310 metres (1,107 ft) away. It is on the edge of the much larger ejecta blanket surrounding the crater Victoria, named the Victoria Annulus. This impact crater was named in honor of HMS Beagle of the Royal Navy, ordered in February 1817, whose second voyage carried Charles Darwin round the world.

== Missions ==
Opportunity spent seven sols (Martian days) looking at the Beagle crater and the surrounding areas.

Sol 872 (July 7, 2006): Opportunity used its panoramic camera for some targeted investigations this sol, then had a communication session with the 2001 Mars Odyssey orbiter. The rover also completed a miniature Thermal Emission Spectrometer sky and ground observation.

Sol 873: An attempt to cross a ripple to the southeast (in order to head towards Beagle Crater) was prematurely halted because the rover appropriately determined that it was making too little progress over the ripple. The rover also did some dust monitoring with its panoramic camera mast assembly (the rover's "head" and "neck"), and conducted some morning atmospheric science, including a sky and ground observation with the miniature thermal emission spectrometer. Opportunity also did a calibration of that instrument on this sol.

Sol 874: Opportunity used its panoramic camera to survey the ground, then took a picture with its navigation camera to determine where to point the miniature thermal emission spectrometer. The miniature thermal emission spectrometer was also used to observe the sky and ground. The panoramic camera took thumbnail images of the sky.

Sol 875: The rover successfully backed away from the ripple that saw 80 percent slip on sol 873. Opportunity used its panoramic camera and miniature thermal emission spectrometer on a distant potential meteorite; those instruments also completed an observation of the sky and ground.

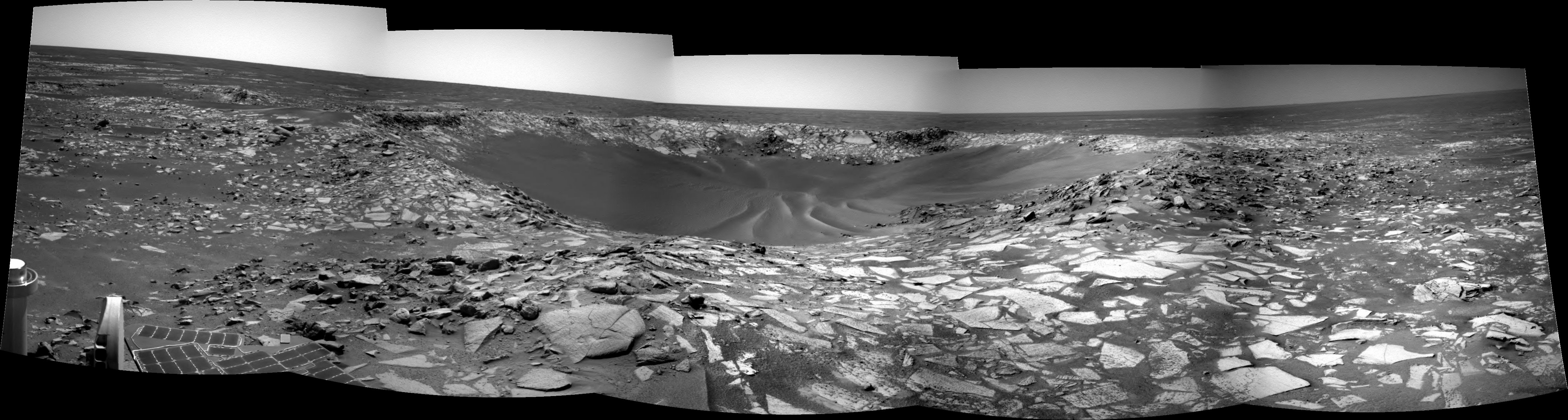
A navcam mosaic looking inside the crater Beagle on Mars. Taken on sol 898.

Sol 876: The rover drove southwesterly towards the edge of a ripple about 15 meters (49 feet) away to evaluate whether the outcrop adjacent to the ripple is reachable, and whether there is a path from the outcrop towards Beagle Crater. The rover also searched for clouds with its navigation camera and observed the sky and ground with its miniature thermal emission spectrometer.

Sol 877: Opportunity drove about 25 meters (82 feet) on an outcrop path towards Beagle Crater. The rover did a "quick find attitude" at the end of the drive, which updates its physical position. The rover supported a Mars Express overflight, and did remote sensing with its panoramic camera and miniature thermal emission spectrometer.

Sol 878: The rover drove about 25 meters (82 feet) towards Beagle Crater. Opportunity performed elevation sky and ground surveys during the Mars Odyssey pass and miniature thermal emission spectrometer sky and ground stares in the morning. A panoramic camera survey in front of the rover will be conducted to help pick a soil target for this weekend's robotic arm activity.

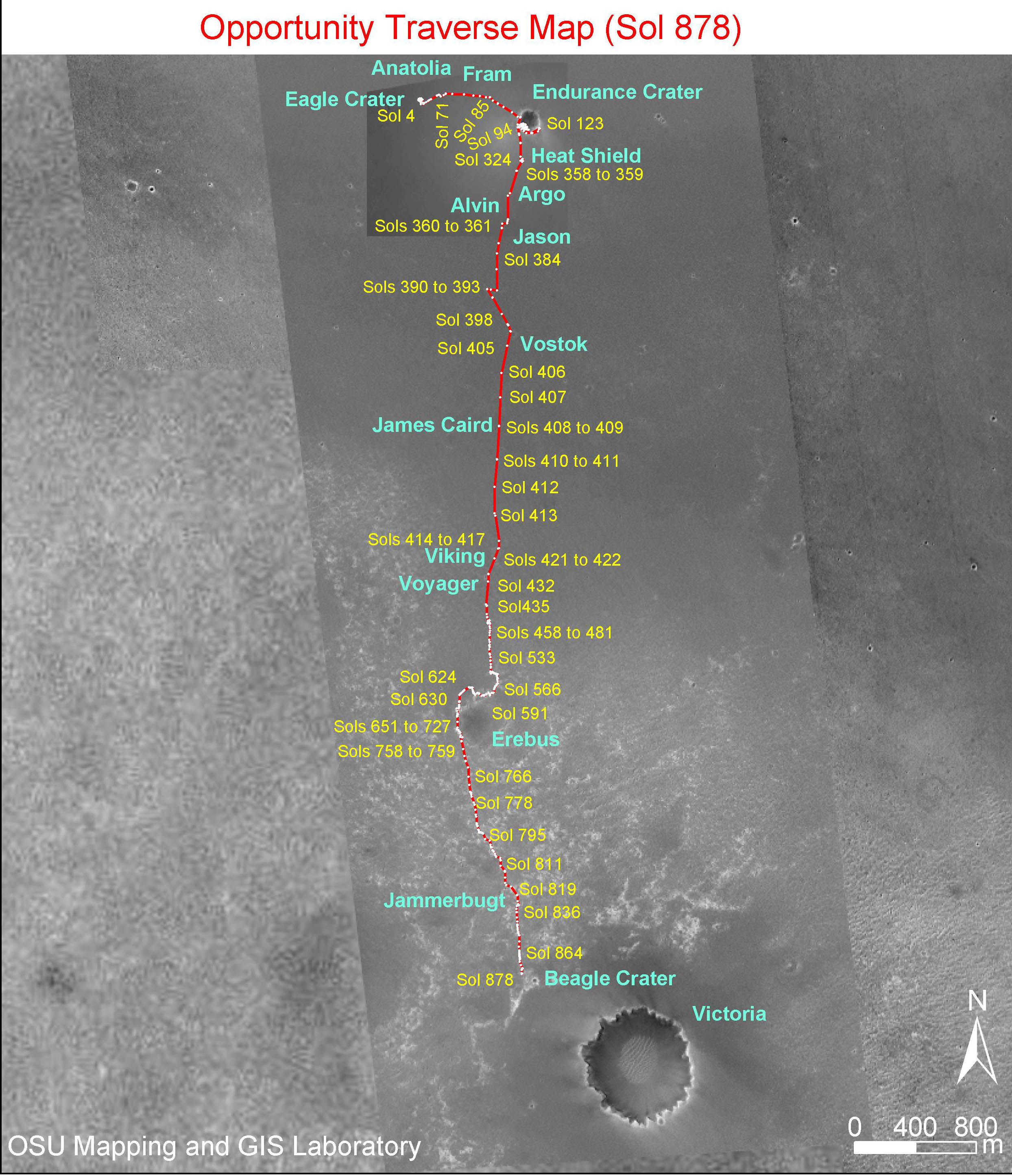
The rover's journey up to Sol 878 (July 2006) on the way to Victoria crater, showing location of Beagle crater

== See also ==
- Geography of Mars
- List of craters on Mars
