= Beagle, Kentucky =

Unincorporated community in Kentucky, United States

- Unincorporated community
- Location within Kentucky
- Coordinates: 38°54′03″N 84°15′17″W
- Country: United States
- State: Kentucky
- County: Campbell
- Elevation: 489 ft (149 m)
- Time zone: UTC-5 (Eastern (EST))
  - Summer (DST): UTC-4 (EDT)
- Area code: 859
- GNIS feature ID: 509445

Beagle is an unincorporated community in Campbell County, Kentucky, United States.
