= Beagle 3 =

Cancelled Mars lander mission

Diagram of the proposed Beagle 3

Beagle 3 (also called Beagle 2: Evolution) was a proposed Mars lander mission to search for life on Mars, past or present. Beagle 3 was the proposed successor to the failed British Beagle 2 Mars lander, with which communication was lost. Beagle 3 was promoted by Professor Colin Pillinger, lead scientist on the Beagle 2. EADS Astrium also played a part in funding and early development of the project. Pillinger dreamed of launching up to two landing craft from an orbiter in 2009 as part of the European Space Agency's Aurora Programme. The putative Beagle 3 would be named after the ship HMS Beagle that took Charles Darwin around the world.

After the Beagle 3 project was rejected by ESA in 2004, Pillinger proposed to the NASA to hitch a ride on the Mars Science Laboratory Mars lander, but the proposal was not accepted.

One of the goals of Beagle 3 was to support the ESA Aurora programme if chosen.

== Proposed payload ==
- Advanced solar cell technology, meaning two disc-shaped solar arrays (as opposed to the previous four)
- A gas analysis package (Gap) to test soil and rock for biosignatures and biomolecules
- Powerful X-band (8.0 to 12.0 GHz) antenna for direct vehicle-to-Earth radio link on the vehicle's main shell, to provide real-time descent data.
- New lithium-ion battery technology—to be able to operate at lower temperatures, meaning less power wasted on heating—a possible 60% capacity boost to that of Beagle 2.
- Deadbeat airbags, which inflate just before touch-down, and gently deflate during landing, so that the probe could come to a stop where it lands, and not bounce to a stop.
- Life-chips, which detect the presence of amino acids.

== Impact of Beagle 2 discovery ==
Beagle 2 was found in 2015, which overturned a previous theory that it hit thin air and collided with Mars at high speed, however it was not known for sure because it did not transmit any data during descent. When the Beagle 2 leader tried to raise money for Beagle 3, the EDL system used on Beagle 2 was an unknown. However, after its discovery there was realization that the EDL must have worked as it was found on the surface with several panels deployed, even though it did not transmit.

One of the goals of Beagle 3 was to use lessons learned from Beagle 2 to improve the spacecraft, and also take advantage of newer technology. However, since it was not clear what happened to Beagle 2, it was not obvious what should be changed.

== See also ==
- Beagle 2
- ExoMars
  - ExoMars Schiaparelli EDM lander
- Life on Mars
- Mars Reconnaissance Orbiter
- Mars Science Laboratory rover
- British space programme
