= Randy Fullmer =

American film producer (1950–2023)

Randall Fullmer
- Born: Randall Wyn Fullmer; April 27, 1950; Richland, Washington, U.S.
- Died: July 10, 2023 (aged 73); Woodland Hills, California, U.S.
- Education: Washington State University; California Institute of the Arts
- Occupations: Film Producer; animator; guitarist
- Years active: 1972–2006 (animation career); 2006–2023 (Wyn Guitars)

Randall Wyn Fullmer (April 27, 1950 – July 10, 2023) was an American film producer and animator at the Walt Disney Company. After a career at Walt Disney Feature Animation, Fullmer launched Wyn Guitars, a guitar retail service.

== Early life and education ==
Fullmer was born in Richland, Washington, on April 27, 1950. His father was a nuclear physicist and his mother was a physical therapist.

Fullmer studied architecture for two years at Washington State University (WSU), from 1968 to 1970. During his second year at WSU, he took a film class and became hopelessly hooked on animation, which motivated him to apply to California Institute of the Arts (Cal Arts). Fullmer was accepted into the animation program at Cal Arts and graduated in 1974 with a degree as a Bachelor of Fine Arts.

== Animator ==
After graduation from Cal Arts, Fullmer spent roughly seven years running his own animation business producing works such as: medical, scientific and other educational films; segments for Sesame Street; television commercials; and Saturday morning television programs.

In 1983 and 1984, Fullmer worked for Don Bluth Studios, creating special effects for Dragon's Lair and Space Ace, the first video games to be produced on Laserdisc. Fullmer also worked at Apogee, John Dykstra's live action special effects house, and he then moved on to Filmation, where he animated on both television and theatrical features from 1985 to 1987. He worked on projects such as Happily Ever After, BraveStarr, She-Ra: Princess of Power and Ghostbusters.

In 1987, Fullmer was hired by Walt Disney Feature Animation (now known as Walt Disney Animation Studios) for a three-month contract to animate on the “Toon Town” section of Who Framed Roger Rabbit, a job that turned into an 18-year career at The Walt Disney Studios. Fullmer's animation film credits include: effects animator on Oliver & Company; effects animator on The Little Mermaid; effects supervisor on The Rescuers Down Under; visual effects supervisor on Beauty and the Beast; artistic coordinator on The Lion King; artistic coordinator on The Hunchback of Notre Dame; producer on The Emperor's New Groove; and producer on Chicken Little.

Fullmer and director Mark Dindal worked on many special effects projects both in Filmation and at Disney.

== Musician ==
Fullmer started taking trombone lessons at the age of six.

At the age of twelve, Fullmer asked his parents if he could buy a 12-string guitar to complement his 6-string electric guitar. When they refused because he already had a guitar, Fullmer asked if he could purchase the wood to build his own 12-string instead. Over the next six years, Fullmer proceeded to build approximately 30 guitars, craftsmanship that was both self-taught and mentored by an old country western fiddle maker named Tom. (Fullmer continued to build guitars throughout his life, but this task was relegated to hobby status while his animation career took precedence.)

Fullmer formed several rock bands with friends throughout his youth, including the rock group "The Isle of Phyve" which toured the Pacific Northwest on weekends, summers and holidays while Fullmer was in high school.

== Wyn Guitars ==
Wyn Guitars was established in 2006. Fullmer was both the founder and sole luthier for the company and crafted guitars for musical talents including Jimmy Haslip, Abraham Laboriel, James LoMenzo, Ben Jones, Stewart McKinsey, Robin Zielhorst, Maurice Fitzgerald, Adam Johnson, and Ethan Farmer.

== Restrung ==
A documentary, called Restrung, was made in 2014 about Fullmer's career making guitars from 2006 to now. The film was made by Mike Enns, after being fascinated with Fullmer's guitar making. It also talks about his time as a kid making guitars as a hobby and his time at the Disney Company. The film also marks a return to film director Mark Dindal. As of 2023, the film can be viewed on YouTube.

== Death ==
Fullmer died following a battle with cancer in Woodland Hills, Los Angeles on July 10, 2023, at the age of 73.

== Filmography ==
Year	Film	Position
1985	Lifeforce	Special Visual Effects Crew
1987	The Brave Little Toaster	Special Effects Animator
1987	Pinocchio and the Emperor of the Night	Special Effects Animator
1988	BraveStarr: The Legend	Special Effects Animator
1988	Who Framed Roger Rabbit	Effects Animator: Additional Animator
1988	Oliver & Company	Effects Animator
1989	The Little Mermaid	Effects Animator
1990	The Rescuers Down Under	Effects Supervisor
1991	Beauty and the Beast	Visual Effects Supervisor
1992	Aladdin	Special Effects Animator
1993	Happily Ever After	Special Effects Animator
1994	The Lion King	Artistic Coordinator
1996	The Hunchback of Notre Dame	Artistic Coordinator
2000	The Emperor's New Groove	Producer
2002	The Sweatbox	Himself
2005	Chicken Little	Producer
2014	Restrung	Himself, producer, composer

== Nominations ==
- Best Visual Effects for Beauty and the Beast (BAFTA Award) (1993)
- Best Animated Feature for The Emperor's New Groove (Online Film and Television Association Award) (2001)
- Outstanding Producer of Animated Feature Motion Picture for Chicken Little (PGA Award) (2006)

== See also ==
- Mark Dindal, a frequent collaborator with Fullmer
- Restrung
