= David Stainton =

American studio executive

President of Walt Disney Feature Animation
- In office January 2003 – January 2006
- Preceded by: Thomas Schumacher
- Succeeded by: Edwin Catmull

Personal details
- Born: David Stainton; November 16, 1961 (age 64) Pittsburgh, Pennsylvania, USA
- Occupation: Studio executive

David Stainton is an American film and television executive. He was the president of Walt Disney Feature Animation from 2003 to 2006, a period during which the studio converted from a traditional animation studio to a computer animation production company. The films Chicken Little (2005) and Meet the Robinsons (2007) were produced during Stainton's tenure at the studio.

== Career ==
Stainton was hired in 1989 by Walt Disney Pictures and Television as a manager of special projects. He transferred to Walt Disney Feature Animation in 1991 as a creative executive. In 1993 he was promoted vice president of creative affairs, during which he was responsible for adapting Victor Hugo's "The Hunchback of Notre Dame" as an animated feature which was released in 1996. In 1997, he was promoted to senior vice president of creative affairs and supervised Walt Disney Feature Animation France, S.A. from December 1997 until December 1999 where he helped produced a significant portion of Disney's animated production of "Tarzan" released in 1999.

Returning to Burbank in January 2000, he became the executive vice president of both Walt Disney Television Animation and DisneyToon Studio, later becoming president of both divisions in February 2002.

In January 2003, he moved back to Walt Disney Feature Animation as president taking DisneyToon Studios with him. Stainton ordered the closing of the Walt Disney Feature Animation Florida in January 2004.

In January 2006 the Walt Disney Company acquired Pixar and Stainton was replaced by Pixar co-founder Edwin Catmull and Pixar's chief creative officer, John Lasseter, who headed up of both studios. Unusual for the entertainment business, however, Stainton's creative slate survived the regime change, with "Tangled" the last movie he both put into production.

After leaving Disney, he founded Henry's World Media, a family entertainment production company in 2007. Stainton was hired by Paramount as president of Paramount Animation in October 2011, developed the division's business plan, hired the organization's creative and production staff. He left Paramount in 2012, eventually moving to London to become the Executive Producer for Elysian Films. In addition to executive producing the documentary Good Hope about the changing scene in South African politics, Stainton helped to produce Mrs Harris Goes to Paris, released by Focus Features and Universal Pictures worldwide, in the summer of 2022.
