= Beagle Bay =

Beagle Bay can refer to:

== Places ==
- Beagle Bay, New South Wales, a coastal location at South Durras, New South Wales
- Beagle Bay Community, Western Australia (formerly Beagle Bay Mission)
- Beagle Bay (Western Australia), a bay in Western Australia on the south-western coast of the Dampier Peninsula

== Sport ==
- Beagle Bay (Peninsular) Bombers, an Australian rules football club
