= Beagle Island (Antarctica) =

- Locatiin of Beagle Island within the Danger Islands

- Location in Antarctica

Geography
- Location: Antarctica
- Coordinates: 63°25′S 54°40′W

Administration
- Administered under the Antarctic Treaty System

Demographics
- Population: Uninhabited

Beagle Island is an island lying northeast of Darwin Island in the Danger Islands off the east end of Joinville Island. It was named by the UK Antarctic Place-Names Committee in 1963 after HMS Beagle (Captain Robert FitzRoy), due to its proximity to Darwin Island.

== Wildlife ==
Beagle Island has hundreds of thousands of Adélie penguins nesting during each summer. There are dozens of sheathbills, skuas, and pintados seen on every shoreline. There are leopard seals often seen in the water.

== Geology ==
Beagle Island consists of Mesozoic diorite related to the subduction complex ranging from Antarctica to Alaska during the Cretaceous Period (80-120 million years ago).

== See also ==
- List of Antarctic and sub-Antarctic islands
