= Restrung =

- Film poster
- Directed by: Mike Enns
- Produced by: Randy Fullmer; Mike Enns
- Starring: Randy Fullmer; Abraham Laboriel; James Lomenzo; Pikfull
- Narrated by: Randy Fullmer
- Cinematography: Mike Enns; Mark Kalassen
- Edited by: Mike Enns
- Music by: Randy Fullmer; Mark Lalama; Drew Williams
- Production company: Enns Visuals
- Distributed by: VHX.TV
- Release dates: June 19, 2014 (Niagara Integrated Film Festival); July 1, 2014
- Running time: 55 minutes
- Countries: United States; Canada
- Language: English
- Budget: $100,000 (Canadian dollars) $75,377.83 (adjusted)

Restrung is an independent documentary film directed, shot, and edited by Mike Enns and produced by Enns and Randy Fullmer. The film made its world premiere on July 1, 2014.

== Synopsis ==
The film chronicles Fullmer's life and career from making guitars at a young age, to work on Disney animated films such as The Emperor's New Groove, Who Framed Roger Rabbit, and The Lion King, to ultimately resigning from the company and establishing a guitar-making business.

== Cast ==
- Randy Fullmer
- Abraham Laboriel
- James Lomenzo
- Pikfull
- Pennal Johnson
- Fernando Vallin

== Award ==
- RGB Emerging Artists Award - Niagaria Integrated Film Festival
