= Danger Islands =

Islands of Antarctica

- Location within Antarctica

Geography
- Location: Antarctica
- Coordinates: 63°25′S 54°40′W

Administration
- Administered under the Antarctic Treaty System

Demographics
- Population: Uninhabited

The Danger Islands (63°25′S 54°40′W) are a group of islands lying 13 nautical miles (24 km; 15 mi) east-south-east of Joinville Island near the tip of the Antarctic Peninsula.

== Location ==
Trinity Peninsula on Antarctic Peninsula. Joinville Island group to the north

The Danger Islands are in the Joinville Island group, which lies in Graham Land to the east of the tip of Trinity Peninsula, which is itself the tip of the Antarctic Peninsula. The Danger Islands are to the east-southeast of Joinville Island.

== Discovery and name ==
The Danger Islands were discovered on 28 December 1842 by a British expedition under James Clark Ross, who so named them because, appearing among heavy fragments of ice, they were almost completely concealed until the ship was nearly upon them.

== Use by birds ==
The Danger Islands have been identified as an Important Bird Area by BirdLife International because it supports Adélie penguin colonies and seabirds. 751,527 pairs of Adélie penguins (1.5 million individuals) have been recorded in at least five distinct colonies as of March 2018. The survey used drones adapted to the cold.

== Islands ==
=== Beagle Island ===
63°25′S 54°40′W. An island lying northeast of Darwin Island in the Danger Islands. Named by the UK Antarctic Place-Names Committee (UK-APC) in 1963 after HMS Beagle (Captain Fitzroy), due to its proximity to Darwin Island.

=== Darwin Island ===
63°26′S 54°46′W. The largest of the Danger Islands lying 11 nautical miles (20 km; 13 mi) east-southeast of the east tip of Joinville Island, off the northeast end of Antarctic Peninsula. Discovered in 1842 by a British expedition under James Clark Ross, and named by him for Charles Darwin, noted naturalist.

=== Dixey Rock ===
63°28′S 54°40′W. A rock rising 25 metres (82 ft) high above sea level, 1.5 nautical miles (2.8 km; 1.7 mi) southeast of Darwin Island in the Danger Islands. Mapped by FIDS in 1953-54 and 1956–58, and photographed from the air by FIDASE, 1956-57. Named by UK-APC in 1980 after David J. Dixey, Head, Nautical Branch 5, Hydrographic Department.

=== Earle Island ===
63°29′S 54°47′W. A small island 3 nautical miles (5.6 km; 3.5 mi) southwest of Darwin Island and marking the southwest end of Danger Islands. Following work in the area from HMS Endurance, 1977–78, it was named after Augustus Earle (born about 1790), artist in HMS Beagle, in association with Beagle Island and other names in the group.

=== Heroína Island ===
63°24′S 54°36′W. A small island marking the northeast end of Danger Islands. Named by the Argentine Antarctic Expedition, 1948–49, after the expedition ship Heroína Island. Approved by the United States Advisory Committee on Antarctic Names (US-ACAN) in 1993.

=== Peine Island ===
63°24′S 54°42′W. A small island west of Beagle Island in the Danger Islands. The descriptive name "Islote Peine" (comb island) was given by Ministerio de Defensa, Argentina, 1978. The US-ACAN approved the name in 1993 with the generic term Island.

=== Platter Island ===
63°26′S 54°40′W. A small island lying 1 nautical mile (1.9 km; 1.2 mi) east of Darwin Island in the Danger Islands. The descriptive name "Islote Plato" (plate island) was given by Ministerio de Defensa, Argentina, 1977. The term island is appropriate and replaces "islote" (islet) in the name approved by the US-ACAN in 1993. The UK Antarctic Placenames Committee records the island as "Platter Island".

== Sources ==
- Alberts, Fred G., ed. (1995), Geographic Names of the Antarctic (PDF) (2 ed.), United States Board on Geographic Names This article incorporates public domain material from websites or documents of the United States Board on Geographic Names.
- Borowicz, Alex; McDowall, Philip; Youngflesh, Casey; Sayre-McCord, Thomas; Clucas, Gemma; Herman, Rachael; Forrest, Steven; Rider, Melissa; Schwaller, Mathew (2 March 2018). "Multi-modal survey of Adélie penguin mega-colonies reveals the Danger Islands as a seabird hotspot". Scientific Reports. 8 (1): 3926. Bibcode:2018NatSR...8.3926B. doi:10.1038/s41598-018-22313-w. ISSN 2045-2322. PMC 5834637. PMID 29500389.
- "Danger Islands", BirdLife International
- Graham Land and South Shetland Islands, BAS: British Antarctic Survey, 2005
- Le Page, Michael (10 March 2018), "Secret penguins revealed by drones", New Scientist
- May, Ashley (2 March 2018), "NASA satellite images of poop lead researchers to penguin 'supercolony'", USA Today

This article incorporates public domain material from websites or documents of the United States Geological Survey.
