= The Secrets of Droon =

Book by Tony Abbott

- Author: Tony Abbott
- Illustrator: Tim Jessel, David Merrell, Gil Adams, Royce Fitzgerald
- Cover artist: Tim Jessell
- Country: United States
- Language: English
- Genre: Fantasy
- Publisher: Scholastic Inc.
- Published: June 1, 1999 – February 1, 2010
- Media type: Print (hardback and paperback), Audiobook
- No. of books: 44

The Secrets of Droon is a fantasy book series by Tony Abbott aimed at elementary school-age children. The first book, The Hidden Stairs and the Magic Carpet, was published on June 1, 1999. On October 1, 2010, the final book of the series, The Final Quest, was released, concluding its eleven-year run. The series was named by the American Booksellers Association among the top ten books for Harry Potter fans.

An audio version of the series is available from Listening Library, an imprint of the Random House Audio Publishing Group. The series was designed by Dawn Adelman.

The publisher, Scholastic Inc., took huge efforts to popularize the series. In the official website of the series (created by Scholastic), various innovative factors were introduced, such as online games and quizzes based on the series, as well as a timeline and map.

The story is about Eric, Julie, and Neal, three kids who discover an enchanted stairway in Eric's basement that is a portal to the magical and troubled world of Droon. It is a wondrous place where adventure is always close at hand.

== Plot overview ==
Eric Hinkle, Neal Kroger, and Julie Rubin are three friends who accidentally discover a magical world called Droon which is accessed via a rainbow staircase in Eric's basement closet. There they meet Keeah, the princess of Droon who is a wizard, and Galen Longbeard, the first wizard of Droon. Keeah and Galen are trying to defend Droon against Lord Sparr, an evil sorcerer who constantly tries to defeat the protagonists and take control of Droon. Time in Droon is different than time on Earth, and passes much slower. In Droon, a whole year is not even a second on Earth. This factor helps the kids very much and makes their travelling easier.

The first twelve books see Keeah, Eric, Neal, and Julie trying to find and free Keeah's mother, Queen Relna, from a curse placed on her by Witch Demither that transforms her into various animals. The fourteenth, fifteenth, and sixteenth books and the first special edition introduce the plot involving Zara, the Queen of Light, and her three sons: Urik, Galen, and Sparr. Zara was kidnapped along with Sparr by Ko, the emperor of the long-lost evil Empire of Goll, who brought them to Droon.

After Special Edition #1, The Magic Escapes, the series begins to explore the history of Droon as well as its connection to the Upper World. The characters develop with Eric gaining wizard magic and Julie gaining flight and shapeshifting powers from a wingwolf. In the book The Chariot of Queen Zara, Salamandra, Queen of Shadowthorn, arrives in Droon and becomes another central antagonist. Later, her intentions seem mostly good, though her alliance is always in question. In Book 22, 'The Isle of Mists', Sparr awakens Ko; however, in the process Sparr and his pet, the two-headed dog Kem, are de-aged to children and become allies with Keeah and the Upper World children. In Book 28, In the Shadow of Goll, Sparr is turned back into his adult self, though he remains the children's ally. He disappears through a hole in the earth to Droon's Underworld, but reappears in Special Edition #5, Moon Magic. Sparr returns to the present day to give the children and Galen his piece of the Moon Medallion, a magical artifact made of four pieces created by Zara and her sons, before going off on his own journey.

Gethwing, the moon dragon who serves as Ko's lieutenant, becomes the more prevalent villain, especially after Ko is thrown into a bottomless chasm. In Book 33, 'Flight of the Blue Serpent', Eric is wounded by a poisoned ice dagger intended for Galen, and is eventually manipulated by Gethwing into becoming Prince Ungast. Ungast, along with Princess Neffu (Keeah's evil opposite) and Sparr, returned to his younger evil self, form Gethwing's "Crown of Wizards"; it is not until Special Edition #7, The Genie King, that Eric becomes himself again. Eric, pretending to be Ungast, goes undercover to defeat Gethwing.

The series concluded with The Final Quest.

== Books ==
The series consists of 44 books: 36 main series books and 8 Special Editions. They are:

1. The Hidden Stairs and the Magic Carpet (1999)
2. Journey to the Volcano Palace (1999)
3. The Mysterious Island (1999)
4. City in the Clouds (1999)
5. The Great Ice Battle (1999)
6. The Sleeping Giant of Goll (2000)
7. Into the Land of the Lost (2000)
8. The Golden Wasp (2000)
9. The Tower of the Elf King (2000)
10. Quest for the Queen (2000)
11. The Hawk Bandits of Tarkoom (2001)
12. Under the Serpent Sea (2001)
13. The Mask of Maliban (2001)
14. Voyage of the Jaffa Wind (2002)
15. The Moon Scroll (2002)
16. The Knights of Silversnow (2002)
  - Special Edition 1: The Magic Escapes (2001)
17. Dream Thief (2003)
18. Search for the Dragon Ship (2003)
19. The Coiled Viper (2003)
20. In the Ice Caves of Krog (2003)
21. Flight of the Genie (2003)
  - Special Edition 2: Wizard or Witch? (2004)
22. The Isle of Mists (2004)
23. The Fortress of the Treasure Queen (2004)
24. The Race to Doobesh (2004)
25. The Riddle of Zorfendorf Castle (2005)
  - Special Edition 3: Voyagers of the Silver Sand (2005)
26. The Moon Dragon (2006)
27. The Chariot of Queen Zara (2006)
28. In the Shadow of Goll (2006)
  - Special Edition 4: Sorcerer (2006)
29. Pirates of the Purple Dawn (2007)
30. Escape from Jabar-Loo (2007)
31. Queen of Shadowthorn (2007)
  - Special Edition 5: Moon Magic (2008)
32. Treasure of the Orkins (2008)
33. Flight of the Blue Serpent (2008)
34. In the City of Dreams (2009)
  - Special Edition 6: Crown of Wizards (2009)
35. The Lost Empire of Koomba (2009)
36. Knights of the Ruby Wand (2010)
  - Special Edition 7: The Genie King (2010)
  - Special Edition 8: The Final Quest (2010; formerly titled The Endless Voyage)

== Characters ==
=== Protagonists ===
The lead characters of the series are:

- Eric Hinkle - Thoughtful, honest, and the leader of the trio of best friends. The Rainbow Stairs were discovered in his basement. Although he does not see himself as any kind of hero, when something needs to be done, he does not stop to think about it — he just does it. Eric knows from reading the writing in the Tower of Memory that he and his friends have an important part to play in the future of Droon. He dreams of the place often, is plagued by nightmares about Lord Sparr, and goes out on a limb to protect his friends. Eric develops magical powers in Book 12, which begins his long road to becoming a wizard. In the last book, it is revealed Urik is his distant ancestor.
- Neal Kroger - Neal was initially unsure of Droon, but later came to enjoy the place. Neal likes the easy life and is on a perpetual quest for food, which sometimes clouds his judgment. He is often the awkward butt of botched spells, as when he became a bug in Book 3, The Mysterious Island. Many of the small, cuddly creatures of Droon seem to have accepted Neal as one of their own, which he does not seem to mind. He also later gains genie-like powers.
- Julie Rubin - Julie discovered Droon in the first book, as she was the one who first felt the staircase and convinced them to once again go back into the closet and turn off the lights, revealing the rainbow staircase. She first met Neal and Eric in kindergarten, and now they are inseparable friends. Julie is intelligent and loyal, but she prefers to look before she leaps. Later in the series, Julie gains the powers of flight and shapeshifting after being scratched by a wingwolf.
- Princess Keeah - Keeah is the daughter of Queen Relna (a powerful wizard in her own right) and King Zello (a regular man), Keeah is awkwardly learning to assume her destiny as a wizard and the successor of Galen, while still trying to be a kid. She instantly embraces Eric, Julie, and Neal as close friends. Keeah loves Droon, and her responsibility to uphold the good weighs heavily on her at times. Often it is Keeah's spiritual and physical journeys that shape the kids' adventures in Droon. In Special Edition 2, Wizard or Witch?, she battles her witchy alter-ego Princess Neffu for dominance and wins.
- Galen Longbeard - The centuries-old First Wizard of Droon and a person of awesome power, if sometimes absentminded and forgetful. Ages prior, Galen created and sealed the magical staircase that linked the Upper World to Droon. At the beginning of the stories, it was Galen's duty to protect Droon from Sparr, whose mission was to take over of all of Droon. To counter Sparr and other evildoers, Galen trains Keeah in her wizardly powers, knowing that one day she will be more powerful than all of them. In Book 11, it is revealed that Galen was not always a wizard and was once a dashing swashbuckler with a rainbow cutlass and ponytail.
- Urik - Oldest son of Queen Zara, brother to Galen and Sparr. Urik is lost for most of the Droon saga in the looping passages of time. He first appears rescuing Eric from goblins.
- Zara - The Queen of Light, mother of Galen, Sparr, and Urik, and one of the most powerful beings in either world. The mysteries surrounding Zara continue from the earliest books through to the final pages of the Droon saga.
- Max - Max is Galen's assistant and loyal friend, who resembles a large spider with the head of a troll. He has unkempt orange hair and often speaks with a high-pitched twitter. Max does not have magical powers, but his ability to spin webs of spider silk has come in handy, often saving the children from destruction. He takes care of Galen as much as the wizard takes care of him.

=== Antagonists ===
The villains of the series are:

- Lord Sparr - An evil sorcerer who seeks to conquer all of Droon, and has a colossal army of Ninns at his command. Later in the series, it is revealed that Sparr and his mother were previously kidnapped by Emperor Ko. This revelation marks the beginning of a change in Lord Sparr, one that will last until the end of the series.
- Salamandra - The princess, later queen, of the Shadowthorn empire. She has a magic staff as well as a portal called the Portal of Ages which allows her to travel through time. Her allegiance is brought into question often, but she seems to be mostly good intended.
- Gethwing - A dragon from the moon who helped Ko raise Lord Sparr after the death of Sparr's mother, Queen Zara. He is described as being pure black with four wings, a thick tail, and powerful legs.
- Ko - Emperor of the beasts, ruler of ancient Goll, who was defeated by Galen and sealed away in the ancient past, but later awakened by Sparr to resume his aggression. He is eight-feet tall, with gray skin, red eyes, and a bull-like head with curved horns.
- Ungast - Eric Hinkle's evil self, completely the opposite of his normal good self. Ungast is called out of Eric's dream state by Gethwing in Book 34, In the City of Dreams, and becomes a major character.
- Neffu - Keeah's opposite, being the evil side of the good princess. Neffu quickly aligns herself with the villains and grows in power all the way through the Droon stories. She later becomes one of the prized "jewels" in Gethwing's Crown of Wizards.

=== Family members ===
These characters are parents of Eric, Neal and Julie:

- Mr. and Mrs. Hinkle, Eric's parents - Eric's parents are often part of the adventure, in one way or another, usually without knowing it. Mrs. Hinkle later is seen to have been in possession of a magical object of great power. Both Hinkle parents go to Droon at several points in the saga.
- Mrs. Kroger, Neal's mother and head librarian at the public library.
- Mr. and Mrs. Rubin, Julie's parents. In Book 15, The Moon Scroll, the Rubins plan to move away, but Eric's new-found power alters this situation in the subsequent book The Knights of Silversnow.
- Izzy Jackson, Julie's distant cousin. He is mentioned briefly in Book 29, Pirates of the Purple Dawn.

== Translations ==
The series is sold internationally in English and other languages, including Polish, French, Spanish, Russian, Turkish, Malaysian, Korean, Dutch, Czech, Chinese, Slovenian, Bengali, and Persian.
