= Patrick Warburton =

American actor and comedian (born 1964)

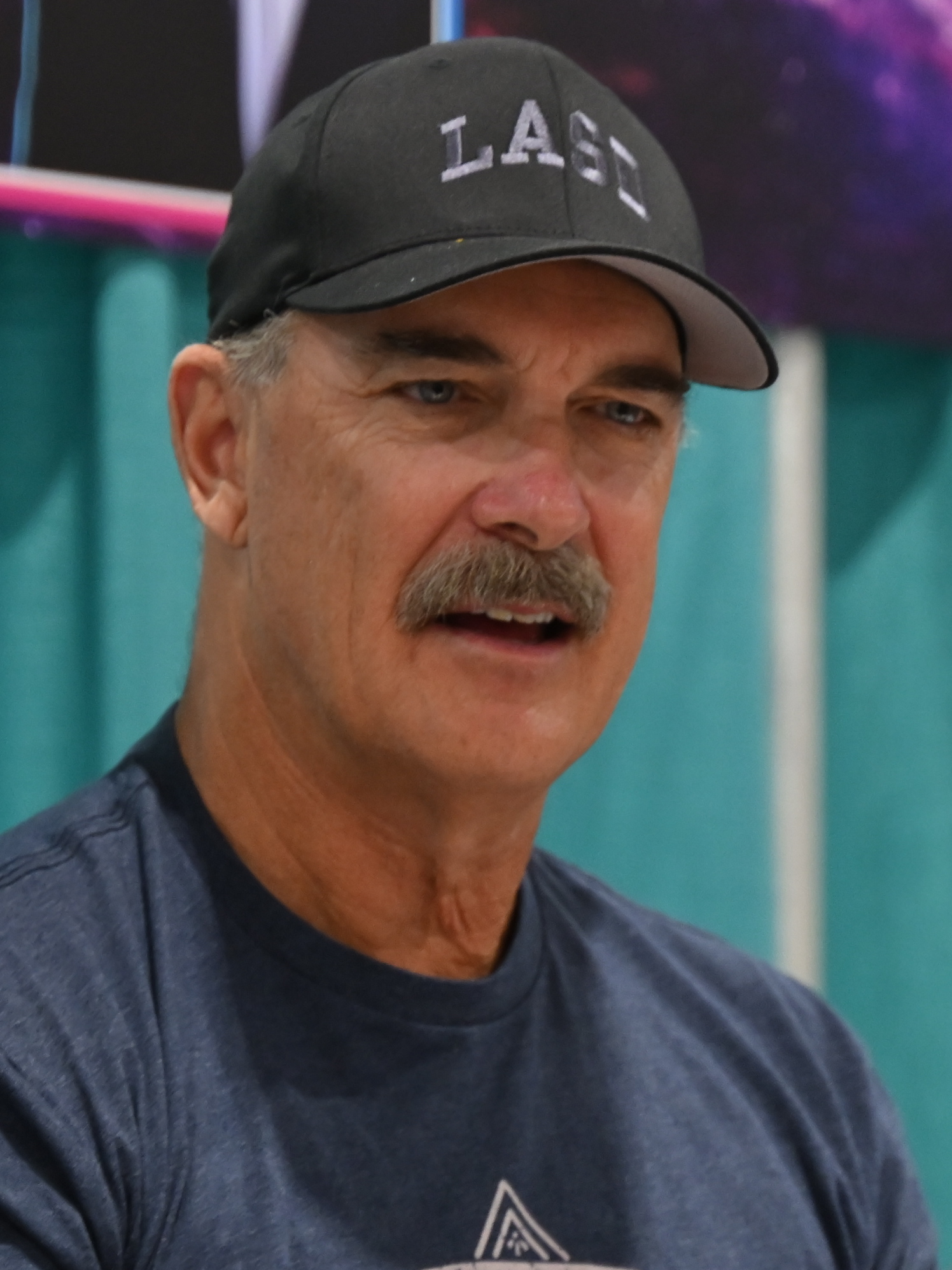
- Warburton at GalaxyCon Richmond in 2024
- Born: November 14, 1964 (age 62); Paterson, New Jersey, U.S.
- Occupations: Actor; comedian
- Years active: 1986–present
- Spouse: Cathy Jennings (m. 1991)
- Children: 4, including Talon Warburton

Patrick Warburton (born November 14, 1964) is an American actor and comedian. He first gained wide recognition for portraying the recurring role of David Puddy on Seinfeld (1995–1998). Other starring roles on television include title character on The Tick (2001–2002), Jeb Denton on Less than Perfect (2003–2006), Jeff Bingham on Rules of Engagement (2007–2013), and Lemony Snicket on A Series of Unfortunate Events (2017–2019). His prominent film credits include The Woman Chaser (1999), Scream 3 (2000), The Dish (2000), Men in Black II (2002), and Ted (2012).

Warburton also voiced roles such as Joe Swanson in Family Guy (1999–present), Kronk in Disney's The Emperor's New Groove (2000), Buzz Lightyear in Buzz Lightyear of Star Command (2000–2001), Mr. Steve Barkin in Kim Possible (2002–2007), Brock Samson in The Venture Bros. (2003–2023), Ken in Bee Movie (2007), Sheriff Bronson Stone in Scooby-Doo! Mystery Incorporated (2010–2013), Flynn in the Skylanders video game series (2011–2016), and Mayor Brian Winddancer in Zootopia 2 (2025). He has also voiced the father of the main character Carl in the audiobooks for the adventure-fantasy books Dungeon Crawler Carl, and within advertising, he plays a "control enthusiast" in commercials for National Car Rental.

In 2025, Warburton also started touring as a stand-up comic.

== Early life ==
Warburton was born in Paterson, New Jersey, on November 14, 1964. He is the son of orthopedic surgeon John Charles Warburton, Jr., and Barbara Jeanne Gratz (an actress credited as Barbara Lord). Warburton and his three sisters, Mary, Lara, and Megan, were raised in a "very religious" and "conservative" Catholic family in Huntington Beach, California, where he attended Saints Simon and Jude Catholic School. Warburton later attended Servite High School (in Anaheim, California), then transferred to Newport Harbor High School (in Newport Beach, California). He studied marine biology at Orange Coast College in Costa Mesa, California, but dropped out to pursue modeling and acting at 19.

== Career ==
In the 1990s, Warburton was known for his recurring role in Seinfeld as David Puddy, an unflappable auto mechanic who was the on-again, off-again boyfriend of Elaine Benes (Julia Louis-Dreyfus). He played Eric in the sitcom Dave's World, and had a small role in the 2002 film Men in Black II as J's new partner, T.

Warburton played the title role in Fox's short-lived series The Tick. He has repeatedly criticized FOX's mismanagement of the series after its cancellation, stating that the network "apparently didn't have a clue". In 2016, he was a producer for the Amazon streaming version of the series.

He played Nick Sharp in 8 Simple Rules and in 2003, joined the cast of Less than Perfect as anchorman Jeb Denton. He also played Jeff Bingham in Rules of Engagement and Rip Riley in the FX series Archer.

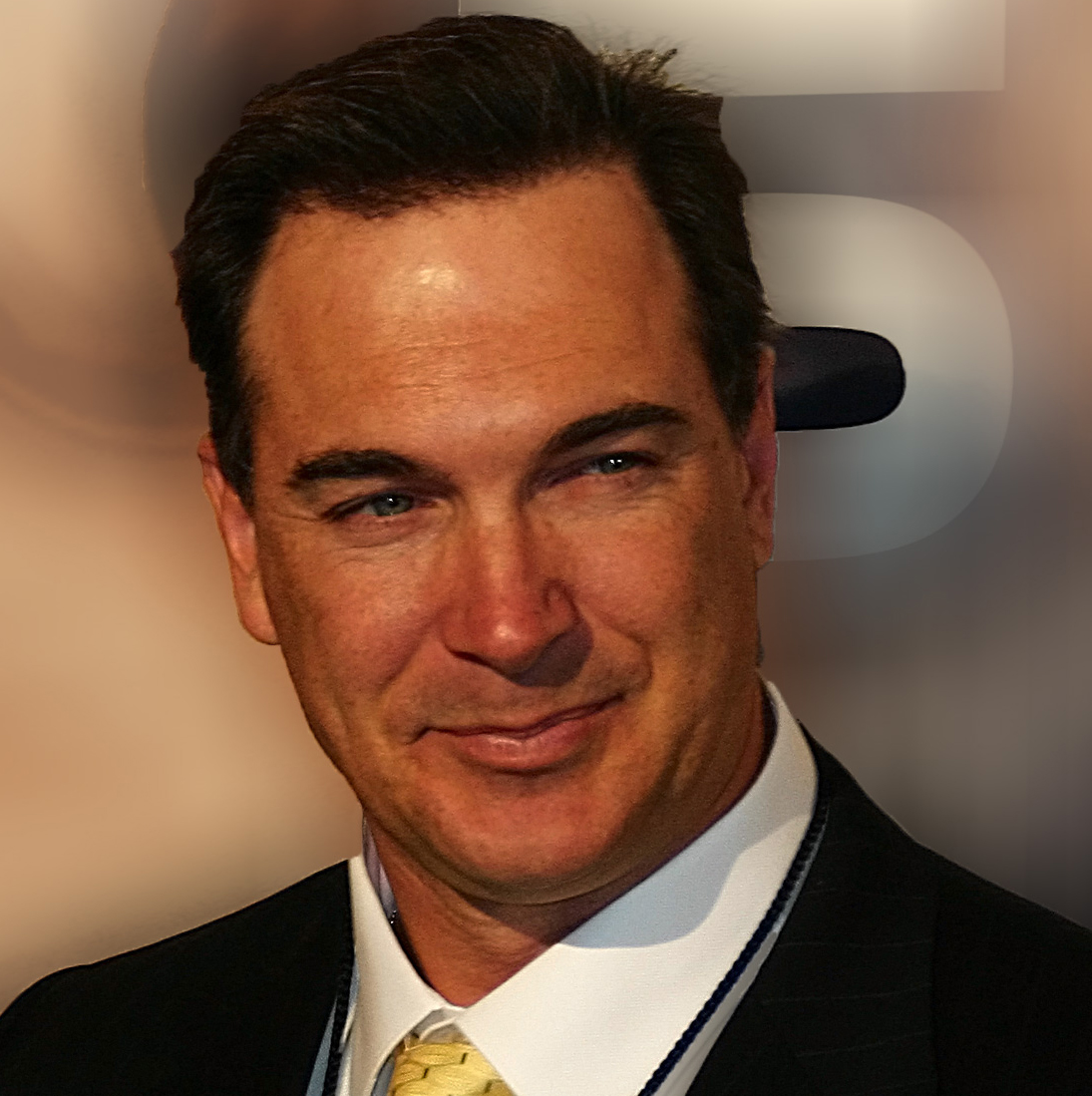
Warburton in 2007

Warburton has provided voices for various animated films and TV programs, including a lead character in Game Over, Buzz Lightyear and the Little Green Men in Buzz Lightyear of Star Command, and Kronk in The Emperor's New Groove, with David Spade, Eartha Kitt, and John Goodman. Spade and Warburton reunited for the CBS sitcom Rules of Engagement, which aired from 2007 to 2013, and Joe Dirt 2: Beautiful Loser in 2015. Warburton reprised his role as Kronk for the direct-to-video sequel Kronk's New Groove and the subsequent TV series The Emperor's New School. He voiced Steve Barkin in the Disney Channel show Kim Possible.

Warburton was also cast in The Venture Bros., where he voices Brock Samson and voices Joe Swanson on Fox's Family Guy and Detective Cash in The Batman. He recorded voices for the animated feature films Hoodwinked!, Chicken Little, Open Season, as well as the DreamWorks animated films Bee Movie and Mr. Peabody & Sherman. In video games, he voiced Lok in the Tak and the Power of Juju video game series and has also reprised the role again in the television series of the same name, as well as Flynn in the Skylanders series. He was also the voice of Commander Blaine H. Tate on the Comedy Central animated series Moonbeam City in October 2015.

Warburton appeared on GSN's Poker Royale Celebrities vs. the Pros tournament in 2005, winning the tournament and the $50,000 grand prize. On November 8, 2009, he appeared as Wild West character Cal Johnson on Seth & Alex's (Almost Live) Comedy Show, hosted by Seth MacFarlane and Alex Borstein on Fox. He was also cast as Sheriff Bronson Stone in the Cartoon Network series Scooby-Doo! Mystery Incorporated, and appeared as Bowser in a video by CollegeHumor, "The Roast of Mario".

He appeared on the American version of Top Gear on February 21, 2012, where he set the "Big Star, Small Car" lap record, beating previous record holder Arlene Tur.

On February 1, 2014, Warburton hosted the 41st Annie Awards.

Warburton starred in the 2016 NBC sitcom Crowded, where Carrie Preston and he played parents who were about to enjoy their empty-nest years, only to find their daughters and his parents moving back in with them. It ran for one season of 13 episodes.

He is featured as a flight attendant in the "preboarding" video shown to guests at Soarin' Around the World in Disney California Adventure in Anaheim, California, and Epcot at the Walt Disney World Resort in Orlando, Florida, where he explains the ride's requirements, reprising his role from the preboarding video of the predecessor ride, Soarin' Over California. He lent his voice to the droid G2-4T in the queue of Star Tours: The Adventures Continue at Disney's Hollywood Studios in Orlando and Disneyland in Anaheim.

He starred as Lemony Snicket in the Netflix comedy drama series A Series of Unfortunate Events.

In 2019, he appeared as Lt. Tharl in The Orville. He also played Rick Stoner in Agents of S.H.I.E.L.D.

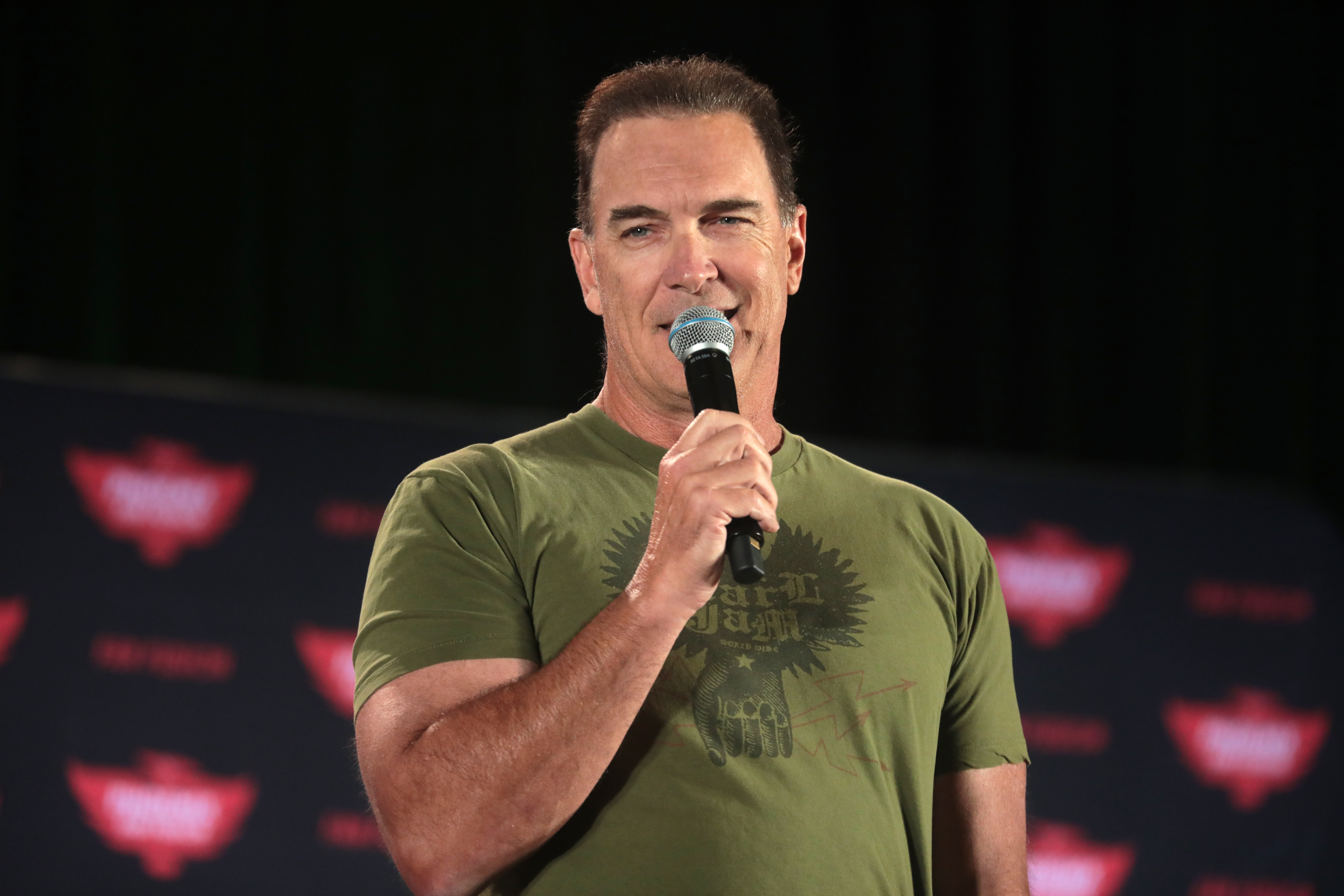
Warburton speaking at Phoenix Fan Fusion in 2022

Despite being a lifelong fan of the Los Angeles Kings hockey team, Warburton has appeared at multiple New Jersey Devils games with his face (and chest) painted similar to that of his Devils-crazed role in an episode of Seinfeld, exhorting the crowd in a manner like that of his David Puddy character. His real-life relationship with the Devils began when the team invited him to drop the ceremonial first puck of the 1995 season, and he showed up with his face painted. After dropping the puck, he slipped and fell, but rescued the moment by regaining his balance and ripping off his shirt to reveal his chest was painted with the letter "D", which came to be regarded as an iconic moment in Devils history. The Devils gave out a Puddy bobblehead doll to fans at a 2019 game.

In the commercial and advertising world, Warburton is the voice in the Carrier Corporation commercials for their air-conditioning and HVAC units, and was the voice of Superman in The Adventures of Seinfeld and Superman for American Express. He is the voice of Lewis in the "Clark and Lewis Expedition" radio commercials for Horizon Air. In August 2009, he played a high-end computer in a "Get a Mac" advertisement for Apple Inc. He became the spokesman for Japanese automaker Honda's "Good Reasons" advertising campaign in September 2011. He is the voice in NAPA's "Can of Know How" commercial. In 2015, he appeared in National Car Rental's "Be the Boss of You" commercials. He is the voice of the current "Discover Fresh" radio ad campaign by Souplantation, a California-based buffet-style restaurant chain (known as Sweet Tomatoes in other markets).

Warburton is also the voice of Ranger, a forest ranger, in a series of radio spots for the national Smokey Bear campaign sponsored by the United States Forest Service and the Ad Council. In 2003, he appeared in the M&M's commercial "You Don't Eat Your Own Kind". More recently, Warburton has begun a career in stand-up comedy, and has actively toured the U.S. In December of 2025, he released his first comedy special, Still Catholic.

== Personal life ==
In 1991, Warburton married Cathy Jennings, whom he met in college. The couple have three sons named Talon, Gabriel, and Shane, and one daughter named Alexandra. They live in Santa Rosa Valley, California. In his free time, Warburton enjoys birdwatching and playing golf.

Warburton is a Catholic and has said that he is willing to turn off Family Guy "when it takes its religious humor too far", perceiving such moments "as diminished returns". His mother, Barbara Warburton, is a member of the Parents Television Council, which is severely critical of Family Guy, on which he voices Joe Swanson. Politically, Warburton has described himself as a "lifelong conservative" with "very liberal views" on some issues. He said that he was rooting for Donald Trump in the 2016 presidential election but also said that he didn't vote for Trump or Hillary Clinton, saying that "there wasn't a candidate that represented me."

Warburton has been involved in charitable acts. His wife and he have visited patients at St. Jude Children's Research Hospital. He also hosts an annual celebrity golf tournament, The Warburton, in Palm Desert to raise money for the hospital. The event combines golf, music, and the local community; in total, he has raised over $30 million since the event's inception in 2005.

On March 8, 2026, Warburton served as the grand marshal for the 2026 Straight Talk Wireless 500.

== Filmography ==
=== Film ===
Year	Title	Role	Notes
1987	Dragonard	Richard Abdee	
1991	Scorchers	Balford	
1994	Dickwad	Charlie's Brother	Short film
1996	American Strays	Rookie Cop	
1999	The Woman Chaser	Richard Hudson	
2000	Scream 3	Steven Stone	
2000	The Dish	Al Burnett	
2000	Buzz Lightyear of Star Command	Little Green Men / Buzz Lightyear (TV version)	Voice, direct-to-video
2000	The Emperor's New Groove	Kronk	Voice
2001	Camouflage	Horace Tutt, Jr.	
2001	Dirt	Vincent	
2001	Joe Somebody	Mark McKinney	
2002	Run Ronnie Run	Head of Gay Conspiracy	Cameo
2002	Big Trouble	Officer Walter Kramitz	
2002	Men in Black II	Agent T	
2004	Bob Steel	Rudy Buckmaster	
2004	Home on the Range	Patrick	Voice cameo
2005	Chicken Little	Alien Cop	Voice cameo
2005	Stewie Griffin: The Untold Story	Joe Swanson	Voice, direct-to-video
2005	Kronk's New Groove	Kronk	Voice, direct-to-video
2005	Hoodwinked!	Wolf W. Wolf	Voice
2005	Sky High	Royal Pain	Voice
2005	The Civilization of Maxwell Bright	Max Bright	
2005	Rebound	Larry Burgess	
2006	The Wild	Blag	Voice
2006	Open Season	Ian	Voice
2006	Happily N'Ever After	Prince	Voice
2007	I'll Believe You	Dr. Seth Douglass	
2007	Underdog	Cad	
2007	Bee Movie	Ken	Voice
2008	Space Chimps	Titan	Voice
2008	Get Smart	Hymie	
2008	Get Smart's Bruce and Lloyd: Out of Control	Hymie	Direct-to-video
2009	Made for Each Other	Mack Mackenzie	
2009	Rock Slyde	Rock Slyde	Also executive producer
2009	The Action Hero's Guide to Saving Lives	Ace Mulligan	
2010	Space Chimps 2: Zartog Strikes Back	Titan	Voice, direct-to-video
2010	Flicka 2	Hank	Direct-to-video
2011	Hoodwinked Too! Hood vs. Evil	Wolf W. Wolf	Voice
2011	The Little Engine That Could	Caboose	Voice
2011	Still Screaming: The Ultimate Scary Movie Retrospective	Himself	Documentary film
2012	Sophomore	Mr. McKee	
2012	Ted	Guy	
2013	Movie 43	Steve	
2013	Bad Milo	Phil	
2014	School Dance	Prairie Puff Man	
2014	The Extendables	Himself	Cameo
2014	Beyond Beyond	The Feather King	Voice
2014	Mr. Peabody & Sherman	King Agamemnon	Voice
2014	Planes: Fire & Rescue	Pulaski (voice)	Cameo
2015	Hoovey	Jeff Elliot	
2015	Divine Access	Bob	
2015	Larry Gaye: Renegade Male Flight Attendant	Captain Bryce	
2015	Ted 2	Guy	
2015	Joe Dirt 2: Beautiful Loser	Foggle / Guardian Angel	
2016	Better Watch Out	Robert	
2016	Elephant Kingdom	Human King	Voice, direct-to-video
2017	Austin Found	Chief Williams	
2017	Animal Crackers	Brock	Voice
2019	The Wedding Year	Michael	
2019	Red Shoes and the Seven Dwarfs	Magic Mirror	Voice
2020	Inheritance	Archer Monroe	
2021	Seal Team	Geraldo	Voice
2022	MEAD	Timmy the Wunderbot	Voice
2023	The Venture Bros.: Radiant Is the Blood of the Baboon Heart	Brock Samson	Voice
2023	Baby Shark's Big Movie!	Grandpa Shark / Mailwaill	Voice
2024	Unfrosted	Tom Terranova	
2025	Zootopia 2	Mayor Winddancer	Voice
2025	Fly Me to the Earth	Conrad Shepard	
2027	Romy and Michele 2	TBA	Filming

=== Television ===
Year	Title	Role	Notes
1986	The Paper Chase	Pool Boy	Episode: "Honor"
1990	Quantum Leap	Blaster	Episode: "The Leap Home: Part 2 (Vietnam) – April 7, 1970"
1991	Anything but Love	Zak Saturday (Adult)	Episode: "The Torrid Zone"
1992	Grapevine	Billy	Episode: "The Lisa and Billy Story"
1992	Northern Exposure	Glenn	Episode: "Northwest Passages"
1992	Murphy Brown	Bo	Episode: "A Year to Remember"
1993	Mad About You	Sam	Episode: "Love Among the Tiles"
1993	Nurses	Chuck	Episode: "What Are Friends For?"
1993	Designing Women	Craig	3 episodes
1993	Love & War	Duane	Episode: "It Don't Mean a Thing If It Ain't Got That Swing"
1994	Rise and Walk: The Dennis Byrd Story	Scott Mersereau	Television film
1995	Grace Under Fire	Meter Man	Episode: "A Night at the Opera"
1995	Ellen	Jack/Brent the Massaeur (The Spa)	3 episodes
1995–1997	Dave's World	Eric	34 episodes
1995–1998	Seinfeld	David Puddy	10 episodes
1998	House Rules	Dan	Episode: "Sex and Violence"
1998	Maggie Winters	Sonny	Episode: "Likable Maggie"
1998–1999	NewsRadio	Johnny Johnson	5 episodes
1998–1999	Hercules	Lastrigon / Agamemnon	Voice, 2 episodes
1999	The Apartment Complex	Morgan	Television film
1999–present	Family Guy	Joe Swanson	Voice, main role
2000	Angels in the Infield	Eddie "Steady" Everett	Television film
2000	Teacher's Pet	Security Guard	Voice, episode: "Movin' on Pup/Escaping Dog Trick"
2000–2001	Buzz Lightyear of Star Command	Buzz Lightyear, Little Green Men, Evil Buzz, Zzub	Voice, main role
2001–2002	The Tick	The Tick	9 episodes
2002	Malcolm in the Middle	Burt Landon	Episode: "Company Picnic"
2002	The Twilight Zone	Azoth the Avenger	Episode: "Azoth the Avenger is a Friend of Mine"
2002–2003	8 Simple Rules	Nick Sharpe	3 episodes
2002–2007	Kim Possible	Steve Barkin	Voice, 35 episodes
2003	Happy Family	Bill Harris	Episode: "Bill's Back"
2003–2006	Less than Perfect	Jeb Denton	49 episodes
2003–2018	The Venture Bros.	Brock Samson	Voice, 71 episodes
2004	Game Over	Rip Smashenburn	Voice
2005–2006	The Batman	Cash Tankenson	Voice, 2 episodes
2005–2006	The X's	Mr. X	Voice, 20 episodes
2006–2008	The Emperor's New School	Kronk	Voice, 52 episodes
2007–2013	Rules of Engagement	Jeff Bingham	100 episodes
2007	Biker Mice from Mars	A-Bomb	Voice, episode: "Here Comes the Judge"
2007	Robot Chicken	Big Jim / The Riddler / Seuss Dad	Voice, episode: "Endless Breadsticks"
2007–2009	Tak and the Power of Juju	Lok	Voice, 15 episodes
2008	Sesame Street	Himself	Episode: "Elmo steps in for Super Grover"
2009	The Fairly OddParents	Agent #1 / Agent #2	Voice, episode: "Wishology"
2009–2010	The Cleveland Show	Joe Swanson	Voice, 2 episodes
2010–2013	Scooby-Doo! Mystery Incorporated	Sheriff Bronson Stone	Voice, 34 episodes
2011–2023	Archer	Rip Riley	Voice, 4 episodes
2012	The Penguins of Madagascar	Elmer	Voice, episode: "Street Smarts/Nighty Night Ninja"
2013	Fish Hooks	Man-Voiced Albert	Voice, episode: "Bye Bye Bea Bea/ Glass Man Standing"
2014	The Soup	Actor	Episode: "Clips of Love and Passion"
2014	Sequestered	Governor Bennett	12 episodes
2014	Lego Star Wars	Member of the 501st Legion	Voice, The Yoda Chronicles; episode: Escape from the Jedi Temple
2015	Randy Cunningham: 9th Grade Ninja	Ninja 2005	Voice, episode: "When Howie Met Randy"
2015	Moonbeam City	Commander Blade H. Tate	Voice, episode: "Quest for Aquatica"
2015	TripTank	Cop / Steve's Dad	Voice, 6 episodes
2016	Crowded	Mike Moore	13 episodes; also producer
2016–2019	The Tick	—N/a	Producer
2017–2022	Puppy Dog Pals	Captain Dog / Worker #1 / Giggle-Me-Sweetheart	Voice, 12 episodes
2017–2019	A Series of Unfortunate Events	Lemony Snicket	25 episodes
2018	Skylanders Academy	Flynn	Voice, 5 episodes
2018–2020	Agents of S.H.I.E.L.D.	General Rick Stoner	4 episodes
2019	The Orville	Lt. Tharl	2 episodes
2020	Space Force	General Dabney Stramm	3 episodes
2020	Elena of Avalor	Grand Macaw	Voice, episode: "Coronation Day"
2020–2025	Baby Shark's Big Show!	Grandpa Shark	Voice, English dub
2022	Madagascar: A Little Wild	Ranger Hay	Voice, episode: "Race to the Rangers"
2022	Teen Titans Go!	Aquaman	Voice, 2 episodes
2022	The Bachelorette	Himself	1 episode
2024	Mr. Birchum	Burly Man	Voice
2025	Duster	Sunglasses	Episode: "Suspicious Minds"
2025	Haunted Hotel	World War One Pilot	Voice, episode: "Ghost Hunters"
2025	Still Catholic	Himself	Television Special
2026	Robot Chicken Adult Swim Special	Brock Samson, Captain Murphy	Voice, Television Special

=== Video games ===
Year	Title	Voice role	Notes
2000	Spider-Man	Hostage	"What If?" mode
2001	The Emperor's New Groove	Kronk	
2003	Tak and the Power of Juju	Lok	
2003	Metal Arms: Glitch in the System	Mozer	
2004	Tak 2: The Staff of Dreams	Lok	
2005	Tak: The Great Juju Challenge	Lok	
2006	Family Guy Video Game!	Joe Swanson	
2006	Open Season	Ian	
2007	Bee Movie Game	Ken	
2007	Call of Duty 4: Modern Warfare	Additional Voices	
2008	Tak and the Guardians of Gross	Lok	
2009	Leisure Suit Larry: Box Office Bust	Damone	
2010	Call of Duty: Black Ops	S.O.G. Operative	
2011	Skylanders: Spyro's Adventure	Flynn	
2012	Skylanders: Giants	Flynn	
2012	Family Guy: Back to the Multiverse	Joe Swanson	
2013	Poker Night 2	Brock Samson	
2013	Skylanders: Swap Force	Flynn	
2014	Family Guy: The Quest for Stuff	Joe Swanson	
2014	Skylanders: Trap Team	Flynn	
2014–2015	Tales from the Borderlands	Hugo Vasquez	
2015	Nords: Heroes of the North	King Björn	
2015	Skylanders: SuperChargers	Flynn	(Note: Skylanders roles are reprising for later releases.)
2016	Skylanders: Imaginators	Flynn	
2018	Lego The Incredibles	Thunderhead	
2020	Call of Duty: Modern Warfare Remastered	American Soldier	

=== Theme parks ===
Year	Title	Role	Notes
2001	Soarin'	Chief Flight Attendant	
2011	Star Tours – The Adventures Continue	G2-4T	Voice

=== Web series ===
Year	Title	Role	Notes
2010	The Roast of Mario	Bowser	

== Awards and nominations ==
Year	Award	Category	Work	Result
2001	Online Film and Television Association Award	Best Voice-Over Performance	The Emperor's New Groove	Nominated
2001	Annie Award	Voice Acting in a Feature Production	The Emperor's New Groove	Nominated
2005	New York VisionFest Outstanding Achievement Award	Acting – Male	The Civilization of Maxwell Bright	Won
2006	Boulder International Film Festival Award	Best Actor	The Civilization of Maxwell Bright	Won
2006	Beverly Hills Film Festival Award	Best Male Performance	The Civilization of Maxwell Bright	Won
2007	Annie Award	Voice Acting in an Animated Television Production	The Emperor's New School	Nominated
2008	Annie Award	Annie Award for Voice Acting in a Feature Production	Bee Movie	Nominated
2019	Annie Award	Outstanding Achievement for Voice Acting in an Animated Television / Broadcast Production	Skylanders Academy	Nominated
2021	Daytime Emmy Award	Outstanding Performer in a Preschool Animated Program	Elena of Avalor: Coronation Day	Nominated
