= Jason Marsden =

American actor (born 1975)

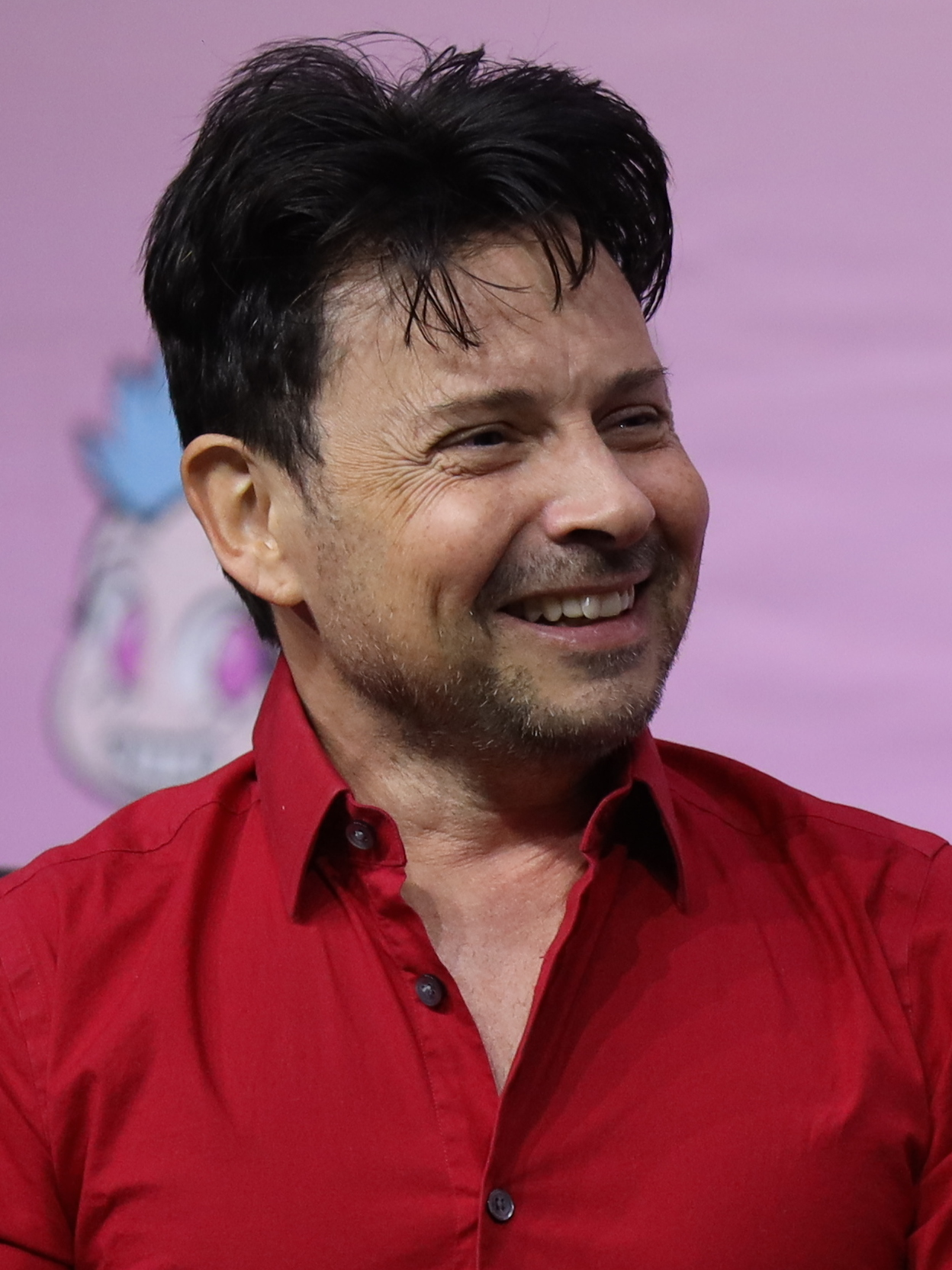
- Marsden at Animate! Des Moines in 2023
- Born: Jason Christopher Marsden; January 3, 1975 (age 51); Providence, Rhode Island, U.S.
- Occupation: Actor
- Years active: 1986–present
- Spouse(s): Christy Hicks (m. 2004; div. 2020) Remy Dee (m. 2026)
- Children: 1
- Website: www.jasonmarsden.com

Jason Christopher Marsden (born January 3, 1975) is an American actor, who has done numerous voice roles in animated films, as well as various television series and video games. He is best known for his voice roles as the voice of the Disney character Max Goof, since 1995, Kovu in The Lion King II: Simba's Pride, Haku in the English dub of Spirited Away, Chester McBadbat in The Fairly OddParents, Matt Olsen/Shagon in W.I.T.C.H., Chase Young in Xiaolin Showdown, Richie Foley / Gear in Static Shock, Tino Tonitini in The Weekenders, Nermal in The Garfield Show and the title character in the Tak and the Power of Juju video game trilogy (Tak and the Power of Juju, Tak 2: The Staff of Dreams and Tak: The Great Juju Challenge) from 2003 to 2005. He is also known for voicing Thackery Binx in the film Hocus Pocus (1993).

== Early life ==
Jason Christopher Marsden was born in Providence, Rhode Island, on January 3, 1975, to Linda (née Williams), and Myles Marsden (1936–2019). Linda was a former fashion model and Myles was a former premier danseur of the Yugoslav National Ballet. Marsden has three older half-siblings from his father's first marriage to Croatian dancer Ivanka Herci Munitic: Ana Fox (née Marsden), ballet dancer Richard Anton "Rick" Marsden, and Mark Marsden.

== Career ==
In 1986, Marsden got his first professional acting job as the character A. J. Quartermaine in the television series General Hospital. In 1987, at the age of 12, Marsden booked his first major film role in the science fiction film Robot Jox, which was released two years after filming because of the studio's financial problems. This was followed soon afterwards by the role of Eddie Munster in the TV series remake of The Munsters titled The Munsters Today. At the same time, Marsden voiced Cavin in Adventures of the Gummi Bears and became the announcer of The Mickey Mouse Club. Marsden continued his career with many guest star appearances on prime time sitcoms. In 1990, he was the voice of Peter Pan in Peter Pan and the Pirates, which ran for two seasons and in 1992, he landed the role of Dash X in Eerie, Indiana. He provided the voice of Thackery Binx's cat and human form in Hocus Pocus (1993), and reprised the role in the Hocus Pocus Villain Spelltacular. His next roles included voicing Goofy's son Max Goof in Disney's A Goofy Movie (1995), as well as in the sequel An Extremely Goofy Movie (2000) and also had a supporting role in White Squall (1996). Marsden also did the voice of Garrett Miller on Extreme Ghostbusters and the younger versions of Shere Khan and King Louie on Jungle Cubs, which was a prequel to Disney's hit film Jungle Book and also continued his role as Max Goof on Disney's House of Mouse.

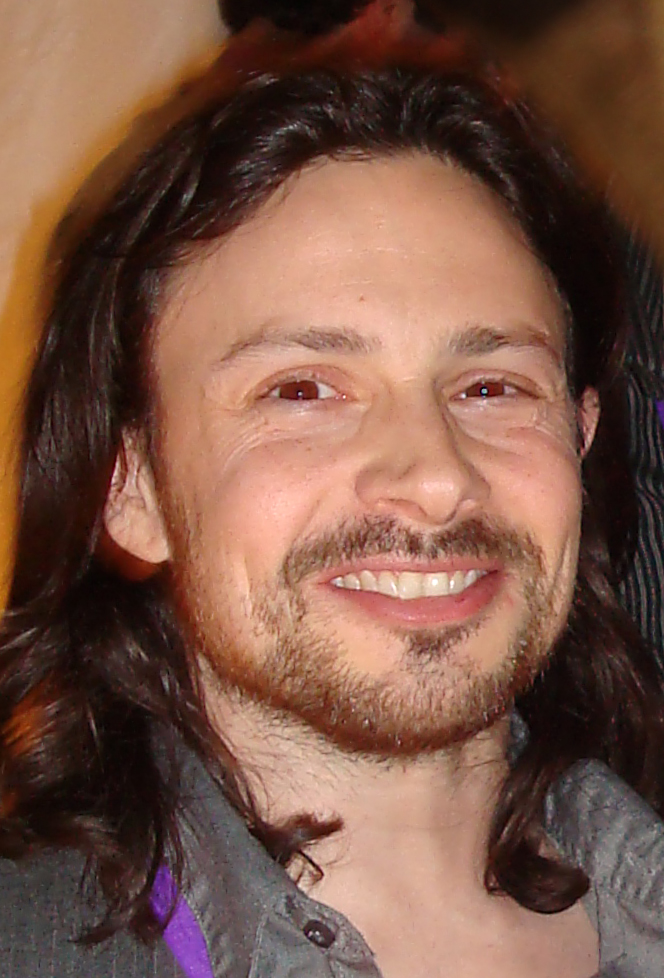
Marsden in 2008

Some other on-camera roles were that of Rich Halke (J.T's best friend) in Step by Step, which was from 1995 until the show's cancellation in 1998; and Nelson Burkhard (D.J.'s rich boyfriend) in Full House, though after making a commitment with Dragon Con, Marsden did not reprise his role as Nelson in the sequel Fuller House, with Hal Sparks taking on the role. On Boy Meets World, Marsden played a character named after himself. The role was created for Marsden by series creator/producer Michael Jacobs, whom Marsden had worked with previously on Almost Home. Marsden left Boy Meets World after finishing the second season, with his character being replaced with Jack Hunter (Matthew Lawrence) in Seasons 5–7. He played the young Burt Ward/Robin in the 2003 television movie Return to the Batcave: The Misadventures of Adam and Burt. In 1999, he was featured in Walt Disney Animation Studios' Tarzan as a member of the gorilla family, a role given by the film's director, Kevin Lima, who also helmed A Goofy Movie. Since Step by Step, Marsden has provided voices for numerous animated television shows and computer games. He did the voice of Kovu in The Lion King II: Simba's Pride (1998) and narrated many of the special features on the Lion King Special edition DVD. He was the voice of Haku in the American dub of Spirited Away (2001). He has also provided the voice of Richie Foley/Gear in the television series Static Shock. In Baldur's Gate II: Shadows of Amn, he voiced several characters, most notably Lilarcor the talking sword, and the druid Cernd. His first foray into directing was an episode of the Nickelodeon series The Journey of Allen Strange (1997). He also directed, wrote, produced and edited The Greatest Short Film Ever!!! and multiple indie music videos.

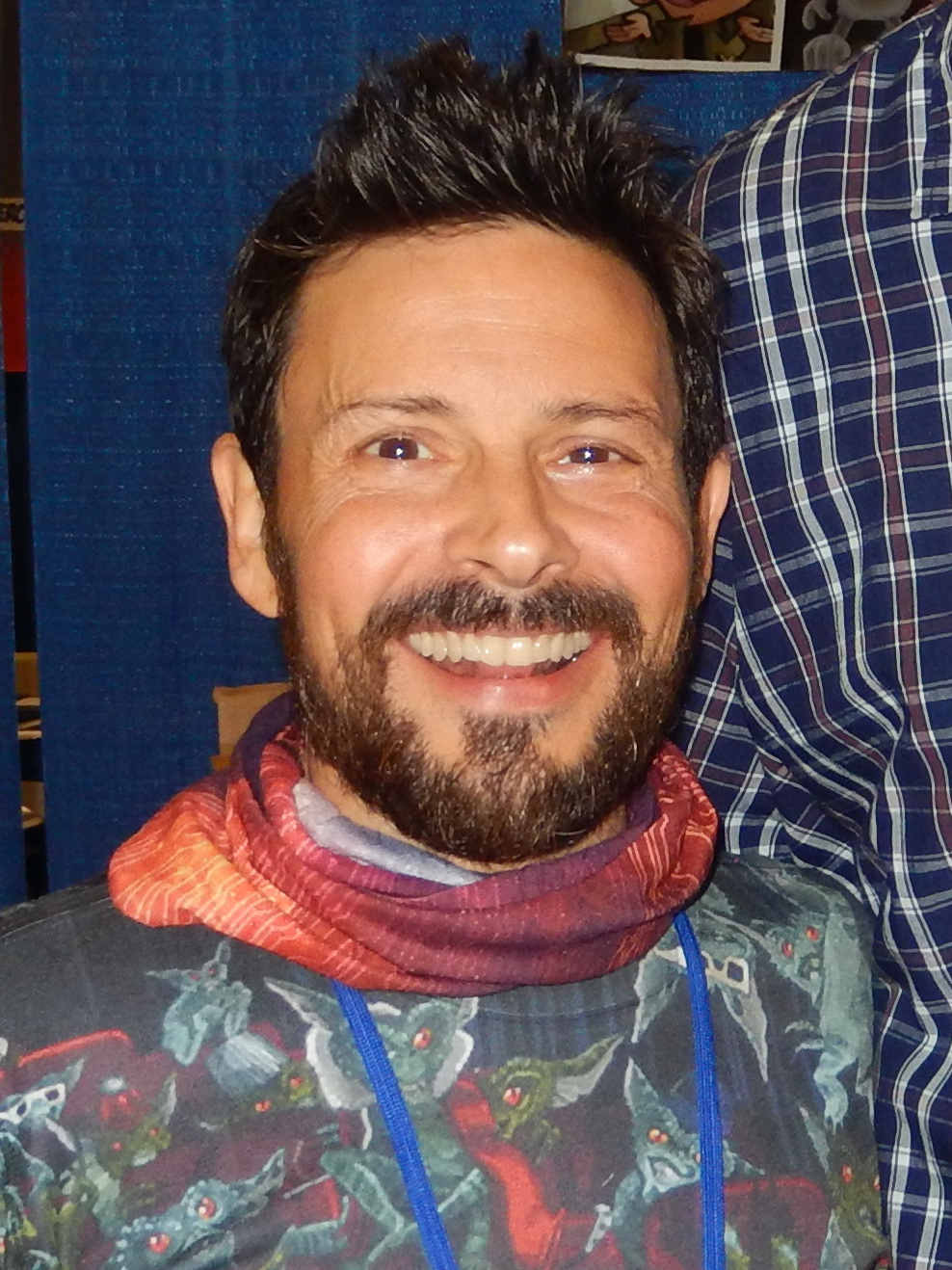
Marsden in 2018

He has done voice-over work on multiple DC Comics-inspired animated series; as Clark Kent as a teenager in Superman: The Animated Series, as Snapper Carr in Justice League, as Billy Numerous in Teen Titans, as Donny Grasso on an episode of Batman Beyond, as Danger Duck in Loonatics Unleashed and as the villain Firefly in The Batman and as Paco in Batman: The Brave and the Bold. Marsden also voiced Chase Young in Xiaolin Showdown from 2003 to 2006, and from 2003 to 2004, voiced Todd Sweeney in the Christmas episode of My Life as a Teenage Robot. He also voiced for Tak in the game Tak and the Power of Juju along with Tak 2: The Staff of Dreams and Tak: The Great Juju Challenge. He voiced two recruitable companion characters in the Fallout game series, Myron in Fallout 2 (1998) and Boone in Fallout: New Vegas (2010). From late summer 2004 to early spring 2007, Marsden was the head announcer for Toon Disney (excluding Jetix), but he also served as a part-time announcer for Disney Channel. He had a cameo in the film Fun with Dick and Jane as the cashier at the gas station, and voiced Tasslehoff Burrfoot in Dragonlance: Dragons of Autumn Twilight. In 2012, Marsden did the voice of Final Fantasy XIII-2 character Noel Kreiss, Kade Burns and Fingers on The Hub series Transformers: Rescue Bots and Kaijudo. In Young Justice, Marsden voiced Bart Allen, Barry Allen's future grandson. Following the cancellation of Young Justice, Marsden returned in 2019 to voice Bart in the series' third season, Young Justice: Outsiders. In 2013, he did the voice of Aye-Aye in The Legend of Korra.

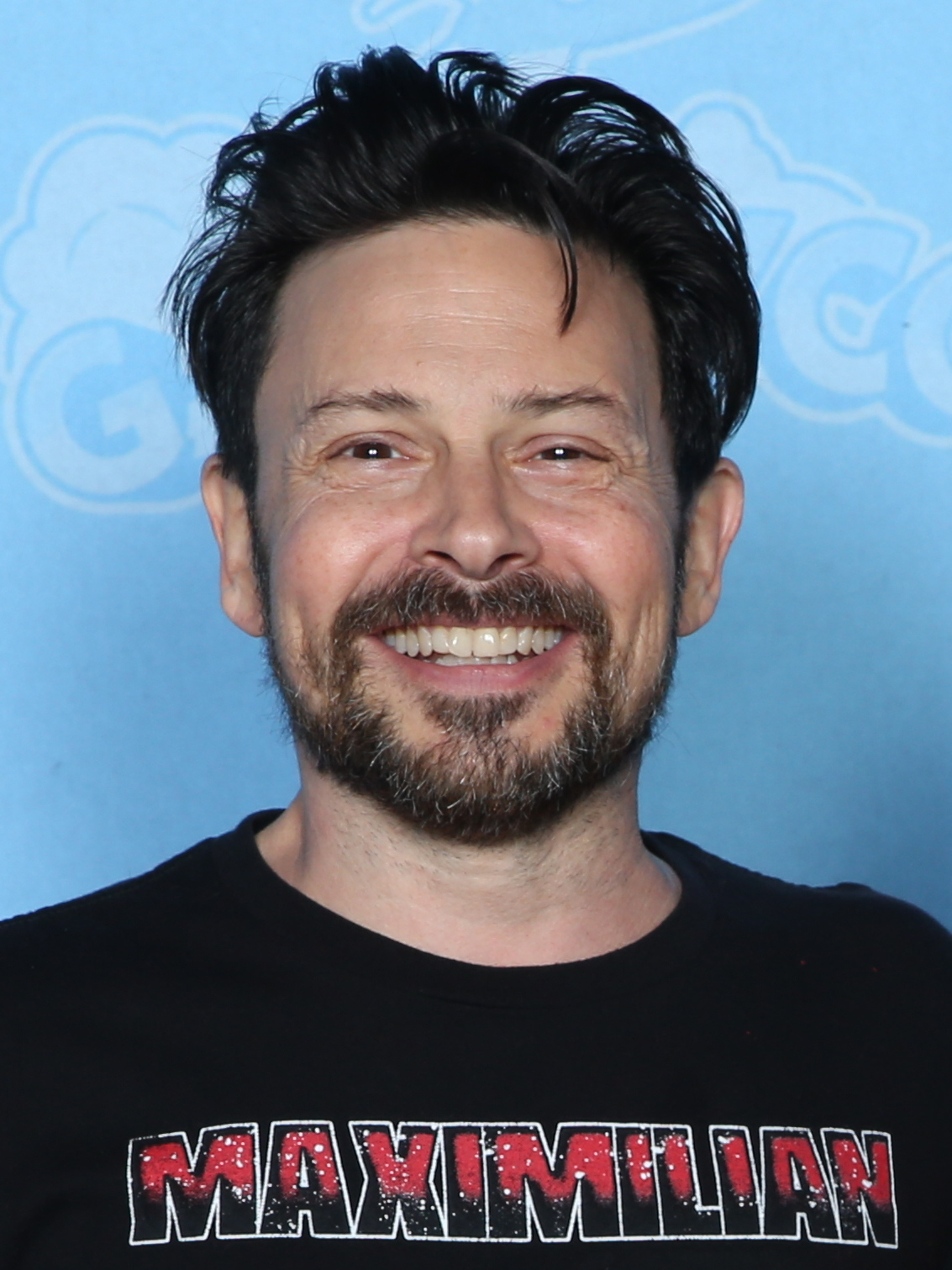
Marsden at GalaxyCon Richmond in 2022

In 2014, he voiced Sumo and Belson in the pilot episode of the Cartoon Network animated series Clarence. After this episode, the voices of Sumo and Belson were handed to Tom Kenny and Roger Craig Smith, respectively. In 2020, Marsden began producing an online web series for YouTube called The Mars Variety Show. Following the style of The Dean Martin Show, it features Indie musicians, comedians, and alternative performers.

== Personal life ==
Marsden married Christy Hicks in October 2004. In 2020, they divorced after 16 years of marriage. Their son was born on February 17, 2010. Marsden lives in Nashville, Tennessee.

In 2005, Marsden and Hicks opened up a Yoga studio in Burbank, California, called Yoga Blend which relocated to a bigger location in 2007. In March 2020, Yoga Blend was shut down due to the COVID-19 pandemic. It closed permanently on December 30, 2020, due to financial issues.

In 2020, Marsden revealed he has a girlfriend during an interview for a YouTube series.

In April 2026, Marsden married his girlfriend, burlesque performer, influencer, and cosplayer Remy Dee.

== Filmography ==
=== Live-action ===
==== Film ====
Year	Title	Role	Notes	Ref.
1990	Robot Jox	Tommy		
1990	Almost an Angel	Boy #2		
1992	Mr. Saturday Night	Buddy, age 15		
1993	Hocus Pocus	Thackery Binx (as a cat)	Voice (voice for the cat)	
1996	White Squall	Shay Jennings, First Albatross Mate		
1997	Trojan War	Josh		
2001	How to Make a Monster	Bug		
2004	The Greatest Short Film Ever!!!	N/A	Short film; director and producer	
2005	Nice Guys	Wendell		
2005	Fun with Dick and Jane	Convenience Store Clerk		
2007	Misty & Sara	N/A	Short film; director and executive producer	
2008	Animated American	N/A	Short film; executive producer	
2009	Locker 13	Edgar	Also director	
2011	Pizza Man	Professor Baldini		
2012	Blue Like Jazz	Kenny		
2013	I Know That Voice	Himself	Documentary	
2023	The Shift	Cyrus		
2024	Not Just a Goof	Himself	Documentary	

==== Television ====
Year	Title	Role	Notes	Ref.
1986–1988	General Hospital	A.J. Quartermaine		
1987	Webster	David	Episode: "Games People Play"	
1988–1991	The Munsters Today	Edward Wolfgang "Eddie" Munster		
1989	Nightingales	Unknown role	1 episode	
1989	Murphy Brown	Young Miles Silverberg	Episode: "The Summer of '77"	
1991	Tales from the Crypt	Jess	Episode: "Undertaking Palor"	
1991	Star Trek: The Next Generation	Raymond Marr	Voice, uncredited	
1992	Eerie, Indiana	Dash X	6 episodes	
1992	Baywatch	Pier Pressure	Episode: "Pier Pressure"	
1992	Blossom	Eddie Warwick	Episode: "The Making of the President"	
1993	Almost Home	Gregory Morgan	13 episodes	
1993	The Adventures of Brisco County, Jr.	Jason Barkley	Episode: "Senior Spirit"	
1993–1998	Step by Step	Rich Halke	53 episodes	
1994	Tom	Mike Graham	12 episodes	
1994	The Secret World of Alex Mack	Carlton Hendy	Episode: "Science Fair"	
1994–1995	Full House	Nelson Burkhard	4 episodes	
1994–1995	Boy Meets World	Jason	9 episodes	
1995	Family Reunion: A Relative Nightmare	Billy Dooley	Television film	
1996	Star Trek: Deep Space Nine	Grimp	Episode: "Bar Association"	
1997–1999	The Journey of Allen Strange	N/A	Director (9 episodes)	
2002	Will & Grace	Kim	Episode: "It's the Gay Pumpkin, Charlie Brown"	
2002	Even Stevens	Norman Squirelli	Episode: "Your Toast"	
2003	Return to the Batcave: The Misadventures of Adam and Burt	Young Robin	Television film	
2003	Just Shoot Me!	Tony Zitelli	Episode: "The Talented Mr. Finch"	
2012	Space Guys in Space	Cal	Also executive producer	
2025	A Week Away: The Series	Bog	7 episodes	

=== Voice roles ===
==== Film ====
Year	Title	Role	Notes	Ref.
1995	A Goofy Movie	Max Goof		
1999	Tarzan	Mungo		
2001	Spirited Away	Haku		
2006	Brother Bear 2	Kenai	Original trailer; replaced by Patrick Dempsey in the final film	
2013	Monsters University	Monster Student #1		
2016	The Secret Life of Pets	Additional Voices		

==== Direct-to-video ====
Year	Title	Role	Notes	Ref.
1990	Cartoon All-Stars to the Rescue	Michael	Television special	
1998	The Lion King II: Simba's Pride	Young Adult Kovu		
2000	An Extremely Goofy Movie	Max Goof		
2002	The Boy Who Cried Alien	Principal		
2004	Tales of a Fly on the Wall	Kip		
2004	Felix the Cat Saves Christmas	Professor		
2004	Mickey's Twice Upon a Christmas	Max Goof		
2004–2006	The Jimmy Timmy Power Hour	Chester McBadbat		
2007	Garfield Gets Real	Nermal		
2008	Dragonlance: Dragons of Autumn Twilight	Tasslehoff Burrfoot, Goblin #2, Goblin Servant		
2008	Batman: Gotham Knight	Thomas Wayne		
2008	Garfield's Fun Fest	Nermal, Ramone		
2009	Garfield's Pet Force	Nermal, Abnermal		
2010	DC Showcase: Jonah Hex	Young Man, Bartender	Short film; direct-to-video	
2014	We Wish You a Merry Walrus	Sydmull	Television special	
2023	Batman: The Doom That Came to Gotham	Dick Grayson, young Bruce Wayne		

==== Television ====
Year	Title	Role	Notes	Ref.
1988–1990	Adventures of the Gummi Bears	Cavin	7 episodes	
1990	Peter Pan & the Pirates	Peter Pan		
1993	Sonic the Hedgehog	Dirk	Episode: "Warp Sonic"	
1993	Mighty Max	Young Norman	Episode: "Norman's Conquest"	
1993	Marsupilami	Shnookums		
1994	Batman: The Animated Series	Spunky Spencer	Episode: "Baby-Doll"	
1995	The Shnookums & Meat Funny Cartoon Show	Shnookums		
1995	The Mask	Skillit	2 episodes	
1996	Superman: The Animated Series	Teenage Clark Kent, Owen		
1996	Project G.e.e.K.e.R.	Cappery Employee, Kid Dinosaur	Episode: "Geekasaurus"	
1996–1997	Jungle Cubs	Shere Khan, Prince Johar, Louie	Season 1	
1997	Extreme Ghostbusters	Garrett Miller		
1998–1999	Histeria!	William Ramsey, Bucky	2 episodes	
1999	Xyber 9: New Dawn	Jack		
1999	Recess	James Stone	Episode: "The Spy Who Came in from the Playground"	
1999	Batman Beyond	Donny Grasso	Episode: "Hooked Up"	
1999	Pinky, Elmyra & the Brain	Taylor Tyler Hoovie	Episode: "That's Edutainment"	
2000	Roughnecks: Starship Troopers Chronicles	Private Max Brutto	Episode: "Spirits of the Departed"	
2000	Buzz Lightyear of Star Command	Flash Flemming	Episode: "Inside Job"	
2000–2004	The Weekenders	Tino Tonitini, additional voices		
2000–2004	Static Shock	Richie Foley/Gear, Carmen Dillo	Main role	
2001–2003	House of Mouse	Max Goof	8 episodes	
2001–2003	The Legend of Tarzan	Mungo		
2001–2002	Invader Zim	Various voices	3 episodes	
2001–2004	Justice League	Snapper Carr		
2002	Even Stevens	Norman Squirelli	Episode: "Your Toast"	
2002	Teamo Supremo	Ollie Jimson		
2002	Rugrats	Smedley	Episode: "The Perfect Twins"	
2002	Oh Yeah! Cartoons	Principal	Episode: "The Boy Who Cried Alien"	
2002–2005	¡Mucha Lucha!	Rikochet	Season 3 only	
2003–2004	My Life as a Teenage Robot	Todd Sweeney, Lon, Lieutenant, various voices	3 episodes	
2003	Lilo & Stitch: The Series	Waiter, young Jumba Jookiba	2 episodes	
2003	Totally Spies!	Ian	Episode: "I Want My Mummy"	
2003–2011	The Fairly OddParents	Chester McBadbat, Imaginary Gary, Dash Baxter, Jeff (Live action), Various voices		
2004–2007	Kim Possible	Felix Renton		
2004	The Batman	Firefly, Boy #1, Boy #2		
2004	Dave the Barbarian	Galder	Episode: "Rite of Pillage"	
2004–2006	Xiaolin Showdown	Chase Young	17 episodes	
2004–2006	A.T.O.M.	Master Guan		
2004–2006	W.I.T.C.H.	Matt Olsen, Shagon		
2005–2007	Loonatics Unleashed	Danger Duck, Pilot #2, Robo-Amigo, Rupes Oberon	Main role	
2005	Codename: Kids Next Door	Windsor, Jerry Rassic		
2005	Danger Rangers	Alex, Lucky, Kevin, Jack, Rusty		
2006	Teen Titans	Red Star, Billy Numerous		
2007	Afro Samurai	Sasuke		
2008	The Replacements	Dustin Dreamlake		
2008–2011	Batman: The Brave and the Bold	Paco, Speedy, Scooby-Doo Robin		
2008–2015	The Garfield Show	Nermal, various characters		
2010	Generator Rex	Skwydd, Lieutenant, Hipster, Scientist #1	6 episodes	
2010	G.I. Joe: Renegades	Duke, Cobra Trooper #2, Intel Agent, Mitchell, Guard #1	25 episodes	
2010–2013	MAD	Ty Pennington, Freddie Benson, Edward Cullen, Zeke, Jacob Black, Sqaush, Hiccup Horrendous Haddock III, Joe Lamb, Phil Coulson, Kid Flash, Lolcat, various characters		
2011	The Super Hero Squad Show	Nova	2 episodes	
2011	Ben 10: Ultimate Alien	Young Max Tennyson, Antonio	2 episodes	
2011–2016	Transformers: Rescue Bots	Kade Burns, Various characters		
2012–2013, 2019–2022	Young Justice	Bart Allen/Impulse/Kid Flash, Ray Palmer/Atom, Danny Chase, Lok-Ron, Thomas Tompkins, Reach Commercial Singer		
2012	Kaijudo: Rise of the Duel Masters	Joseph "Fingers", Minion 33		
2012	ThunderCats	Leo	Episode: "Birth of the Blades"	
2012	Scooby-Doo! Mystery Incorporated	Horbert Feist	Episode: "Web of the Dreamweaver!"	
2012	Kick Buttowski: Suburban Daredevil	Various characters		
2013	Doc McStuffins	Teddy B.		
2013	Ultimate Spider-Man	Oliver Osnick/Steel Spider, Weird Kid, News Guy	2 episodes	
2013	Doctor Lollipop	Nurse Crackers		
2013–2014	The Legend of Korra	Aye-Aye, Huan, Settler, Suyin Beifong's Friend		
2014	Clarence	Sumo, Belson, Brian	Episode: "Pilot"	
2014	Beware the Batman	Young Bruce Wayne	Episode: "Fall"	
2015	Hulk and the Agents of S.M.A.S.H.	Thad	Episode: "Days of Future Smash, Part 5: The Tomorrow Smashers"	
2016	Looped	Hector the Collector	3 episodes	
2016, 2019	The Lion Guard	Kovu	2 episodes	
2017	DuckTales	Hack Smashnikov, Funso, Manager, Host	2 episodes	
2022–2024	Transformers: EarthSpark	Agent Conway, GHOST Agent #1, Holographic Boy		
2024	Batman: Caped Crusader	Gorman, Reporter	2 episodes	

==== Video games ====
Year	Title	Role	Notes	Ref.
1998	Fallout 2	Myron		
1998	Baldur's Gate	Ajantis Ilvastarr, Tranzig, Varci, Lothander		
2000	Alundra 2: A New Legend Begins	Pirate B, Kings Messenger A		
2001	The Lion King: Simba's Mighty Adventure	Kovu		
2001	Fallout Tactics: Brotherhood of Steel	Horus		
2001	Baldur's Gate II: Throne of Bhaal	Cernd, Valas		
2001	Floigan Bros.	Hoigle Floigan		
2001	Disney's Extremely Goofy Skateboarding	Max Goof		
2002	Disney Golf	Max Goof		
2002	Disney Sports Skateboarding	Max Goof		
2002	Disney Sports Football	Max Goof		
2002	Disney Sports Basketball	Max Goof		
2003	Star Wars Jedi Knight: Jedi Academy	Rosh Penin		
2003	Star Wars: Knights of the Old Republic	Dustil Onasi / Brejik / Igear		
2003	Gladius	Ludo		
2003	The Fairly OddParents: Breakin' Da Rules	Chester McBadbat / Male Shopper		
2003	Tak and the Power of Juju	Tak		
2004	Tak 2: The Staff of Dreams	Tak		
2005	Tak: The Great Juju Challenge	Tak		
2006	Syphon Filter: Dark Mirror	Private Janzen		
2006	Xiaolin Showdown	Chase Young		
2010	StarCraft II: Wings of Liberty	Milo Kachinsky		
2010	Resonance of Fate	Pater		
2010	Fallout: New Vegas	Craig Boone		
2010	Marvel Super Hero Squad: The Infinity Gauntlet	Nova		
2011	Killzone 3	ISA Soldiers		
2011	X-Men: Destiny	Iceman		
2011	The Elder Scrolls V: Skyrim	Aerin, Sven, Gwilin, Eltrys, Onmund, Erik & Mikael		
2011	Jurassic Park: The Game	Billy Yoder		
2012	Final Fantasy XIII-2	Noel Kreiss		
2012	Epic Mickey 2: The Power of Two	Ghost Ian		
2013	DuckTales: Remastered	Worker		
2014	Lightning Returns: Final Fantasy XIII	Noel Kreiss		
2018	Lego DC Super-Villains	Atom, Owlman		
2025	The Elder Scrolls IV: Oblivion Remastered	Wood Elf Male, Wood Elf Beggar Male		

=== Albums ===
Year	Title	Role	Notes	Ref.
2025	Flummox – Southern Progress	Preacher on “Coyote Gospel”		

=== Theme parks ===
List of voice performances in theme parks
Year	Title	Role	Notes	Ref.
2018	Max Live: Gettin' Goofy with It	Max Goof	Disneyland Paris live show	
