= Chicken Little (video game) =

2005 video game

- North America cover art for Windows version
- Developers: Avalanche Software; (PS2/PC/GC/Xbox) Artificial Mind and Movement (GBA)
- Publisher: Buena Vista Games
- Composer: Billy Martin
- Platforms: GameCube; Microsoft Windows; PlayStation 2; Xbox; Game Boy Advance
- Release: NA: October 18, 2005; FR: November 17, 2005; EU: February 10, 2006
- Genre: Action-adventure
- Modes: Single-player, multiplayer

Chicken Little is a 2005 action-adventure game developed by Avalanche Software for GameCube, Microsoft Windows, PlayStation 2 and Xbox and by Artificial Mind and Movement for the Game Boy Advance; both were published by Buena Vista Games. Based on the 2005 film of the same name, they were released in October 2005.

== Plot ==
The game follows the same plot as the film Chicken Little. The game also features the original actors reprising their roles in the game, except for Joan Cusack (Abby) and Don Knotts (Mayor Turkey Lurkey) (who are replaced by Pamela Adlon and Jeff Bennett respectively).

== Gameplay ==
Chicken Little is an action-adventure game. The player takes control of Chicken Little; occasionally the player is able to play as Abby, Runt, and Fish Out of Water in six different levels and Mayor Turkey Lurkey in one level. The player's goal (mostly) is to get into the end of the stage, but player also can collect five baseball cards throughout each level of the game, the cards unlock special bonus mini-games in multiplayer mode.

== Development ==
The game was showcased at E3 2005.

== Release ==
Alongside The Chronicles of Narnia: The Lion, the Witch and the Wardrobe, Chicken Little was the first console title self-published by Buena Vista Games' European division. The game was first released in France in November 2005 and then in other territories the following year.

The game was officially shown off at E3 2005.

In Japan, the game would be published and distributed through D3 Publisher.

== Reception ==
Reception

Aggregate score
Aggregator	Score
Metacritic	(PC) 71/100 (GBA) 71/100 (Xbox) 68/100 (GCN) 67/100 (PS2) 60/100

Review score
Publication	Score
IGN	(NGC) 7.0/10 (GBA) 7.8/10

Chicken Little received "mixed or average reviews" on all platforms according to video game review aggregator Metacritic. Despite the mixed reception, the Academy of Interactive Arts & Sciences nominated Chicken Little for "Children's Game of the Year" during the 9th Annual Interactive Achievement Awards.

== Sequel ==
A sequel to the game, titled Chicken Little: Ace in Action, was released for the PlayStation 2, Nintendo DS, Wii, and Microsoft Windows in 2006.
