= Tak and the Power of Juju =

2003 video game

- North American PS2 box art
- Developers: Avalanche Software (GCN, PS2); Helixe (GBA)
- Publisher: THQ
- Producer: John Blackburn
- Artist: Jeff Bunker
- Writer: Randolph Heard
- Series: Tak
- Platforms: GameCube; PlayStation 2; Game Boy Advance
- Release: NA: October 15, 2003; EU: March 12, 2004
- Genres: Platform, action-adventure
- Mode: Single-player

Tak and the Power of Juju is a 2003 platform video game developed by Avalanche Software and published by THQ for the GameCube, PlayStation 2 and Game Boy Advance. The first game in the Tak series, it was released in North America on October 15, 2003 and in Europe on March 12, 2004.

== Gameplay ==
Tak and the Power of Juju is a platformer in which the player controls Tak, who can jump, attack, and interact with animals to overcome obstacles. The player's health is represented by the feather on Tak's head and, along with mana, can be restored by collecting feathers found throughout the environment. After obtaining the Spirit Rattle, he gains access to "Juju Powers", which are acquired by collecting tokens scattered around the environment.

== Plot ==
According to an ancient prophecy, the Moon Juju, the guardian of the Pupanunu people, will be weakened by the evil Tlaloc, an embittered Pupanunu shaman who seeks to transform the Pupanunu into sheep as revenge for not being made high shaman in favor of another shaman, Jibolba. However, a warrior trained by the high shaman will restore the Moon Juju, defeat Tlaloc, and bring peace to the Pupanunu.

In the present, Tlaloc steals the Moon Stones, which the Moon Juju uses to protect the Pupanunu from evil, and uses them to change the people into sheep. Jibolba escapes Tlaloc's spell and believes his apprentice Lok to be the warrior of the prophecy. However, as he prepares to send him off, he discovers that he has seemingly been transformed into a sheep. Jibolba sends his younger apprentice, Tak (voiced by Jason Marsden), to find magical plants and change him back, though it turns out not to be Lok, but his squire Tobar. Jibolba tells Tak to obtain the Spirit Rattle, which allows its wielder to communicate with Juju spirits, while he finds Lok.

Upon returning with the Rattle, Tak discovers that Lok has been trampled to death by a herd of sheep. Jibolba has Tak collect one hundred magic Yorbels and Lok's spirit from the spirit world, allowing him to resurrect Lok. However, since Lok suffers from diarrhea (or the "Resurrection's Revenge" as Jibolba calls it) as a side effect of the resurrection, Tak obtains the Moon Stones while he recovers, restoring the Moon Juju's power. The Moon Juju reveals that the warrior of the prophecy is not Lok, but Tak. Using his Juju spells, Tak defeats Tlaloc and transforms him into a sheep, fulfilling the prophecy.

== Development and release ==
The concept for Tak and the Power of Juju originated at Avalanche Software as early as 1995, inspired by a team member's dream of playing a video game with a witch doctor protagonist. Initial concept art and pitches were developed by 1998. Avalanche pitched the game to THQ, who in turn proposed the concept to Nickelodeon. After nine months of further refinements, the concept was sold to Nickelodeon. Its development marked an innovative approach in creating an intellectual property for video games before expanding to television.

Avalanche CEO John Blackburn listed Jak and Daxter: The Precursor Legacy, Ratchet & Clank, and Sly Cooper and the Thievius Raccoonus as influences on the game, and looked to Super Mario 64, Yoshi's Island, and The Lost Vikings as examples for its design. The game's focus on humor was inspired by Looney Tunes, and was done to make the characters more easily likable and to broaden the game's appeal to all ages. Nickelodeon contributed story, character development, voice talent, and scripting by Randolph Heard, while Avalanche retained primary creative control due to Nickelodeon's lack of hands-on experience in game development. Maryland-based band Wakefield recorded a cover of Iggy Pop's "Real Wild Child (Wild One)" for the soundtrack after playing a beta in-studio.

The game had a marketing budget of $8.7 million.

== Reception ==
Reception

Aggregate score
Aggregator	Score		
Aggregator	GBA	GameCube	PS2
Metacritic	60/100	71/100	68/100

Review scores
Publication	Score		
Publication	GBA	GameCube	PS2
Game Informer	5/10	N/A	6.75/10
GamePro	N/A	N/A	3.5/5
GameRevolution	N/A	N/A	C
GameSpot	N/A	6.8/10	6.8/10
GameSpy	N/A	2/5	2/5
GameZone	7/10	8.4/10	7.8/10
IGN	5/10	8.2/10	7.9/10
Nintendo Power	3.6/5	3.8/5	N/A
Official U.S. PlayStation Magazine	N/A	N/A	3.5/5
X-Play	N/A	N/A	3/5
The Cincinnati Enquirer	4/5	N/A	N/A
Pocket Games	6/10	N/A	N/A

The game received "mixed or average reviews" on all platforms according to the review aggregation website Metacritic. GameSpot gave both the GameCube and PlayStation 2 versions a 6.8 out of 10, writing, "Tak and the Power of Juju can serve as a decent platformer, but if you're in the market for one, it shouldn't be your first choice." The game sold more than one million units.

During the 7th Annual Interactive Achievement Awards, Tak and the Power of Juju was nominated by the Academy of Interactive Arts & Sciences for "Console Children's Game of the Year", but lost to Mario Party 5.

== Sequels and spin-offs ==
The game spawned two direct sequels, Tak 2: The Staff of Dreams and Tak: The Great Juju Challenge, as well as two spinoffs based on the Tak television series, Tak and the Guardians of Gross and Tak: Mojo Mistake.

== TV series ==
Tak and the Power of Juju is an animated television series that debuted on Nickelodeon on August 31, 2007. Directed by Mark Risley and Jim Schumann, it was the first CGI series to be directly produced in-house by Nickelodeon.
