= A Goofy Movie =

1995 film by Kevin Lima

- Theatrical release poster
- Directed by: Kevin Lima
- Screenplay by: Jymn Magon; Chris Matheson; Brian Pimental
- Story by: Jymn Magon
- Based on: Goof Troop by: Robert Taylor; Michael Peraza Jr.; Goofy by: Art Babbitt; Frank Webb
- Produced by: Dan Rounds
- Starring: Bill Farmer; Jason Marsden; Jim Cummings; Kellie Martin; Rob Paulsen; Wallace Shawn
- Edited by: Gregory Perler
- Music by: Carter Burwell
- Production companies: Walt Disney Television Animation; Disney MovieToons; Walt Disney Feature Animation (Note: Animation services handled by Disney MovieToons, Walt Disney Animation France, and Walt Disney Animation Australia.)
- Distributed by: Buena Vista Pictures Distribution (Note: Released by Buena Vista Pictures Distribution under the Walt Disney Pictures banner.)
- Release date: April 7, 1995
- Running time: 78 minutes
- Country: United States
- Language: English
- Budget: $18 million
- Box office: $37.6 million

A Goofy Movie is a 1995 American animated musical comedy film directed by Kevin Lima (in his directorial debut) and written by Jymn Magon, Chris Matheson, and Brian Pimental. Produced by Walt Disney Television Animation, it is based on The Disney Afternoon television series Goof Troop (1992) created by Robert Taylor and Michael Peraza, and serves as a standalone spin-off to the show. Taking place three years after the events of Goof Troop, it follows Goofy and his now teenage son, Max, as they embark on a misguided father-son fishing trip across the United States.

Former Walt Disney Company chairman Jeffrey Katzenberg suggested a storyline inspired by a planned car trip with his daughter to Goof Troop's story supervisor Jymn Magon. Expanding Goofy as a character that would resonate with audiences, the film features the voices of Bill Farmer, Jim Cummings, and Rob Paulsen reprising their roles from the series as Goofy, Pete and P.J., respectively, while Jason Marsden replaces Dana Hill as Max, alongside Kellie Martin, Wallace Shawn and Pauly Shore as new characters. The rhythm and blues singer Tevin Campbell provides the vocals for Powerline, a fictional pop star who prominently appears in the film, performing the songs "Stand Out" and "I 2 I". Production lasted for two and a half years.

A Goofy Movie was released theatrically in the United States and Canada on April 7, 1995, by Buena Vista Pictures Distribution through the Walt Disney Pictures banner. Because it had been greenlit by Katzenberg, its release was deemed by Disney to be a contractual obligation. It initially received mixed reviews from critics and was a modest commercial success, grossing $37.6 million against an $18 million production cost worldwide. However, with its home media release, it garnered a cult following and has become a more prominent property within Disney. A direct-to-video sequel, An Extremely Goofy Movie, was released on February 29, 2000. A documentary about the making of A Goofy Movie, Not Just a Goof, premiered in 2024 and was released on Disney+ in 2025 to coincide with the 30th anniversary of the film's original release.

== Plot ==
Max Goof is an average teenager who pines after his classmate Roxanne, idolizes pop star Powerline and has a tense relationship with his clumsy and old-fashioned father Goofy, whom he fears he may end up taking after when he grows up, having already inherited his laugh. On the last day of school before summer vacation, Max, with help from his friends P.J. and Bobby Zimuruski, hijacks a school assembly and dances while lip syncing to one of Powerline's songs. The performance succeeds in making Max popular and he invites Roxanne with him to a viewing party of a live broadcast of Powerline's upcoming concert in Los Angeles.

Goofy, after school principal Mazur exaggeratingly warns him about Max's potential "juvenile delinquency", immediately plans a fishing trip to Lake Destiny, Idaho, to curb his son's behavior. Max attempts to cancel his date with Roxanne, but then panics and tells her that not only are he and Goofy traveling to Los Angeles to attend the concert, but that Powerline has invited them onstage.

The Goofs hit the road, visiting a run-down opossum-themed amusement park where Goofy inadvertently embarrasses Max. The next day, they run into P.J. and his father, Pete, while camping. Goofy takes his son fishing and shows him a special fishing technique, accidentally luring Bigfoot to their camp and forcing the Goofs to spend the night in the car with Bigfoot outside. While Goofy sleeps, Max alters the map's route to Los Angeles.

The next morning, Goofy makes Max the navigator of the trip and the duo enjoy several stops together. That night, while staying at the same motel, Pete overhears a conversation between Max and P.J. and informs Goofy about his son's deception. Goofy still believes Max will do the right thing, but when Max chooses the route to California the next morning, a furious Goofy stops the car at the Grand Canyon. With the brake loose, the car rolls away on its own; the Goofs chase after it and end up riding the car down the Colorado River. After a brief but heated argument, Goofy acknowledges that Max will always be his son in spite of his maturation and they finally reconcile. After Goofy learns about his son's promise to Roxanne and they evade a waterfall, Goofy decides to take him to the concert.

In Los Angeles, the Goofs arrive at the concert, sneak onstage and became part of the performance, delighting many friends watching from home, including Roxanne. Max and Goofy return home in their barely functioning car and Max tells Roxanne the truth; she admits she always liked him and they make plans to go out. The car explodes, ejecting Goofy into the porch roof of Roxanne's house, and Max proudly introduces his father to his new girlfriend.

== Voice cast ==
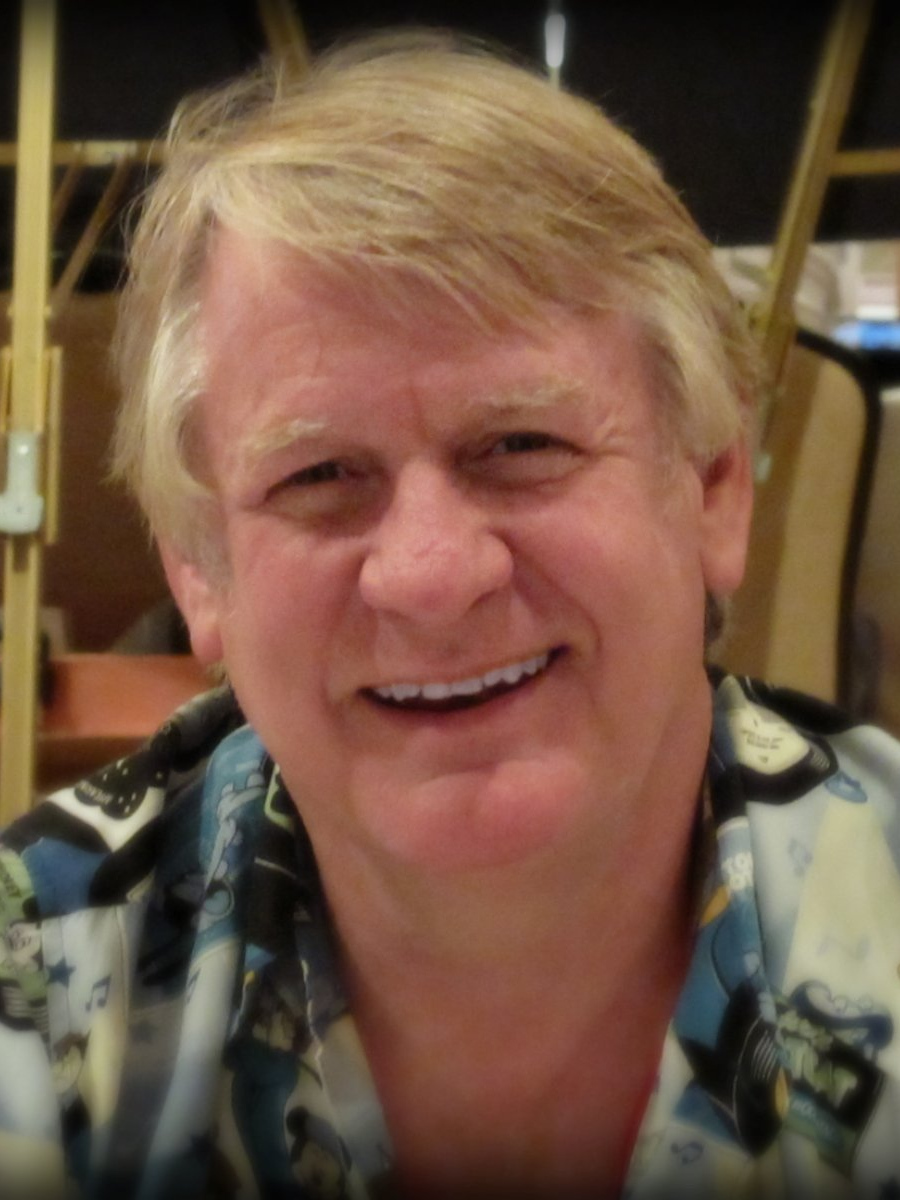
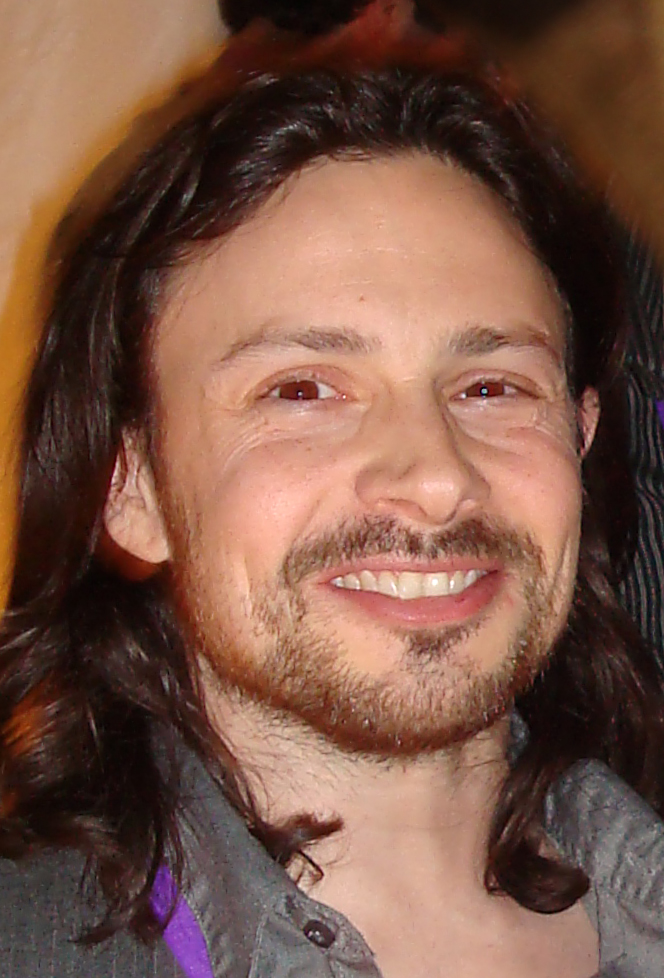
Bill Farmer (pictured in 2010) and Jason Marsden (pictured in 2008) voiced the lead characters Goofy and Max Goof.
- Bill Farmer as Goofy, a hard-working, but clumsy single father who is a photographer at a photo studio in a mall department store.
- Jason Marsden as Max Goof, Goofy's troubled fourteen-year-old son
- Jim Cummings as Pete, Goofy's misanthropic neighbor and co-worker whom he and Max later encounter during their road trip
- Kellie Martin as Roxanne, Max's kind-hearted high school crush
- Rob Paulsen as P.J., Pete's timid son and Max's best friend
- Wallace Shawn as Principal Mazur, the strict principal of Max's school

Tevin Campbell, Rosie Gaines, and Pauly Shore made uncredited performances as the pop star Powerline, Powerline’s backup vocalist, and Max's other friend Bobby Zimuruski, respectively. Jenna von Oÿ portrayed Roxanne's best friend Stacey and Frank Welker provided the vocal effects of Bigfoot. Director Kevin Lima portrayed a walk-around character at Lester's Possum Park and provided the vocal effects of Roxanne's unnamed father.

Florence Stanley portrayed a waitress, Jo Anne Worley portrayed Principal Mazur's upbeat secretary Miss Maples and Julie Brown and Joey Lawrence portrayed the popular students Lisa and Chad. The character actor Pat Buttram appeared in his final role as the master of ceremonies at Lester's Possum Park, while Wayne Allwine made a cameo appearance as Mickey Mouse, alongside a silent Donald Duck.

== Production ==
=== Development ===
In the early 1990s, former Disney chairman Jeffrey Katzenberg commissioned the project, suggesting the storyline inspired by a planned car trip with his daughter to Goof Troop's story supervisor Jymn Magon. Suggesting to make a movie about "contemporary teenagers" as opposed to "talking animal movies and fairytales", Magon thought it would be an interesting idea for the story of Goofy and Max. Accepting Katzenberg's suggestion, Magon attempted to write the first script for the film. The movie was the feature film directorial debut for Disney story artist and animator Kevin Lima, who went on to direct the Disney films Tarzan (1999), 102 Dalmatians (2000) and Enchanted (2007). Instead of being "one-dimensional", Goofy was given an emotional side to show depth to the "emotional arc of the story", hoping the audience would "see his feelings".

While the work was a Disney production, it was considered far less essential than the studio's mainstream works at the time such as The Lion King, and was given a far smaller budget compared to these films. Thus, A Goofy Movie was jointly produced by Walt Disney Feature Animation, Walt Disney Television Animation, and Disney MovieToons and with outsourcing to Walt Disney Animation France and Walt Disney Animation Australia, along with additional Disney animation studios in Spain and Canada.

=== Cast and recording ===
Several of the main voice cast from Goof Troop reprise their roles in A Goofy Movie, including Bill Farmer as Goofy, Jim Cummings as Pete, and Rob Paulsen as P.J.. Max, whose voice was provided by Dana Hill in Goof Troop, is voiced in the film by Jason Marsden when speaking and Aaron Lohr when singing. Some recording sessions were done with only one actor. The film is dedicated to Pat Buttram, who voiced the emcee at the possum park, as he died after finishing his voice work.

Farmer recorded his lines for more than 25 studio sessions. After Farmer recorded nearly all of Goofy's lines, Katzenberg wanted to replace Farmer with Steve Martin, using his normal voice. Thinking it was a bad idea, Farmer was asked to voice Goofy using his regular speaking voice as opposed to the character's signature, cartoonish voice. This confused Farmer, who insisted that audiences wanted to hear the Goofy they were all familiar with. After many weeks of recording lines with his regular speaking voice, Farmer re-recorded his lines to speak in Goofy's regular voice.

=== Animation ===
The animation work was done at Walt Disney Animation France in Paris supervised by Paul and Gaëtan Brizzi, with additional scenes animated at Disney's studio in Sydney, Australia, under the direction of Steve Moore, and clean-up work done at the main Burbank studio. Additional clean-up/animation was done by Phoenix Animation Studios in Canada, and digitally inked-and-painted by the Pixibox studio in France. During one of the screenings, a single dead pixel was noticed in the footage from a monitor they were using, forcing them to recapture three-quarters of the film with a non-defective monitor. As a result, the planned release date was moved from November 1994 to April 1995. Though this created extra work to re-shoot the animation and verify it was clean of defects, Lima said the delay time gave them time to polish up the movie.

=== Music ===
A Goofy Movie: Songs and Music from the Original Motion Picture Soundtrack

Film score by Carter Burwell
- Released: 1995
- Studios: Todd-AO Scoring; Sony Pictures Studio; Conway Recording Studios; The Bakery Studios; Ocean Way Studios; O'Henry Sound Studios; Paisley Park; Signet Sound Studio; Sunset Sound
- Genre: Film score
- Label: Walt Disney
- Producer: David Z

R&B singer Tevin Campbell provided the singing voice of Powerline. While looking for an artist, producers shaped Powerline's image inspired by Prince. Campbell was chosen because he worked with Prince prior to production of the film, being known at the time as "Prince's protégé". Providing Campbell with a song, producers approached David Z to produce songs for the film. His tracks were recorded at Paisley Park. "After Today", "On the Open Road", and "Nobody Else But You" were performed by Bill Farmer and Aaron Lohr. The score for A Goofy Movie was provided by Carter Burwell.

==== Track listing ====
All scores are composed by Carter Burwell and Don Davis.

No.	Title	Lyrics	Music	Performer(s)	Length
1.	"I 2 I"	Patrick DeRemer & Roy Freeland	DeRemer & Freeland	Tevin Campbell & Rosie Gaines	4:01
2.	"After Today"	Jack Feldman	Tom Snow	Aaron Lohr & Chorus	2:21
3.	"Stand Out"	DeRemer & Freeland	DeRemer & Freeland	Campbell	3:00
4.	"On the Open Road"	Feldman	Snow	Bill Farmer, Lohr & Chorus	3:00
5.	"Lester's Possum Park"	Kevin Quinn & Randy Petersen	Quinn & Petersen	Chorus	1:24
6.	"Nobody Else But You"	Feldman	Snow	Farmer & Lohr	2:34
7.	"Opening Fanfare/Max's Dream"				1:49
8.	"Deep Sludge"				2:03
9.	"Bigfoot"				2:13
10.	"Hi Dad Soup"				1:31
11.	"Runaway Car"				2:16
12.	"Junction"				0:45
13.	"The Waterfall!/The Truth"				3:10

== Release ==
=== Theatrical ===
Within Disney, prior to A Goofy Movie's release, the film was frequently associated with Katzenberg. By April 1995, Katzenberg left the company due to facing tensions with former CEO Michael Eisner. The company saw the release of A Goofy Movie as fulfilling contractual obligations. A Goofy Movie was originally scheduled to be released in theaters on November 18, 1994. Due to production setbacks, the release date was moved to April 1995. The Lion King was reissued to fill in for the film's absence.

Not allowed to premiere in California, the film's world premiere was held on April 5, 1995, at the AMC Pleasure Island at Walt Disney World Resort in Lake Buena Vista, and was attended by director Kevin Lima and voice stars Bill Farmer and Jenna von Oÿ; two days later, it was released nationwide. In the United Kingdom, it was released in theaters on October 18, 1996, which included the Mickey Mouse short Runaway Brain.

=== Home media ===
The film was first released on VHS and LaserDisc by Walt Disney Home Video in the United States on September 6, 1995. It was reissued on June 20, 2000, as part of the Walt Disney Gold Classic Collection series on VHS and for the first time on DVD. The movie was released on Blu-ray as a Disney Movie Club exclusive alongside An Extremely Goofy Movie on April 23, 2019, with several contents edited to make it more fitting for the intended audiences. A Goofy Movie was re-released on Blu-ray on November 14, 2023, as part of the Disney Legacy Animated Film Collection, which consists of 100 titles from both Walt Disney Animation Studios and Pixar as part of the 100th anniversary celebration of the Disney company.

== Reception ==
=== Box office ===
A Goofy Movie opened in 2,159 theaters at second place on its opening weekend with $6.1 million—held from the number one spot because of the Will Smith blockbuster Bad Boys that opened the same weekend, with $15.5 million in box office returns. It ultimately ended its run at the US box office grossing $35.3 million. Internationally, it grossed $2.3 million, partially due to the fact the film was not released theatrically in most overseas territories, for a worldwide total of $37.6 million.

=== Critical response ===
On the review aggregator website Rotten Tomatoes, A Goofy Movie holds an approval rating of 64% based on 55 reviews, with an average rating of 6.2/10. The website's critical consensus reads, "A Goofy Movie offers enough of its titular ingredient to satisfy younger viewers, even if most parents will agree that this beloved character deserves better." On Metacritic, the movie has a weighted average score of 53 out of 100 based on 17 critics, indicating "mixed or average" reviews.

==== Initial ====
Upon release, the film received polarized responses from critics. Most film critics did not comprehend that Goofy could have an emotional side. Roger Ebert gave the film three stars out of four, noting that he only got to see a portion of the film in his initial viewing before a technical problem in the projection booth ended the screening early (somewhere between 35 and 40 minutes into the film, based on information given in his review — much less than the approximate hour he believed he had seen). He later clarified the film was worthy of three after viewing the entire film stating, "Three stars is about right." In his one-star review from The Austin Chronicle, Louis Black said "The movie appears to have forgotten that [...] it is an adolescent angst drama about his son Max's ambivalent feelings about having Goofy as a dad. This is a story about a boy and a dad [...] it is bland, a barely television-length cartoon stretched out to fill a feature, and not much fun." Writing for the San Francisco Chronicle, Peter Stack summarized it as "brutal", and said that "there's no denying that A Goofy Movie can't be a proud moment for Walt Disney Pictures." While the Los Angeles Times questioned the overall tone of the film, Empire's Bob McCabe gave the movie three stars out of five and the following verdict: "Harmless enough day in the sun for Goofy; pity there's an overwhelming feeling throughout that he deserves better."

From The New York Times, Stephen Holden called the film's story "too rambling and emotionally diffuse for the title character to come fully alive." Writing for Variety, Todd McCarthy criticized the film's score, and felt that the personality of Goofy's character, while agreeable enough in support, proved a bit over the top for a headliner, and that "by any reasonable reckoning, he's distinctly overbearing and selfish, and responds with a bland dismissal to any opinion offered up by his son".

==== Retrospective ====
Since its release, A Goofy Movie has undergone critical reevaluation and is now appreciated as a "true cult classic". In a 2020 editorial for Rotten Tomatoes, Rafael Matomayor wrote: "Featuring a small-scale story that kids can see themselves in, an excellent portrayal of teenage life and father-son relationships, and, crucially, a soundtrack filled with earworms to rival the work of Rice and Menken, the movie has something for everyone." Nell Minow of Common Sense Media praised the low-key tone and humor of the film.

=== Accolades ===
Award	Date of ceremony	Category	Nominee(s)	Result	Ref.
Annie Awards	November 11, 1995	Best Animated Feature	A Goofy Movie	Nominated	
Annie Awards	November 11, 1995	Best Achievement in Production Design	Fred Warter (production designer)	Nominated	
Annie Awards	November 11, 1995	Best Achievement in Storyboarding	Brian Pimental	Nominated	
Annie Awards	November 11, 1995	Best Achievement in Music	Patrick DeRemier and Roy Freeland for "I 2 I" and "Stand Out"	Nominated	
Annie Awards	November 11, 1995	Best Achievement in Animation	Dominique Monféry (animation supervisor)	Nominated	

== Legacy ==
=== Cultural impact ===
A Goofy Movie is one of the most beloved films by Disney fans. After its meager box office performance during its theatrical release, A Goofy Movie nearly fell into obscurity, but it started to gain success in 1995 due to home media sales, becoming a sleeper hit. The interest in the film is attributed to a combination of the film's catchy soundtrack and slapstick humor as well as its story of cross-generational connections between parents and children. The newfound interest led to waves of new merchandise based on the film to be sold at major retailers, including Target and Hot Topic. Many black viewers embraced the film as a "cultural cornerstone", interpreting that Goofy and Max are a "black father and son".

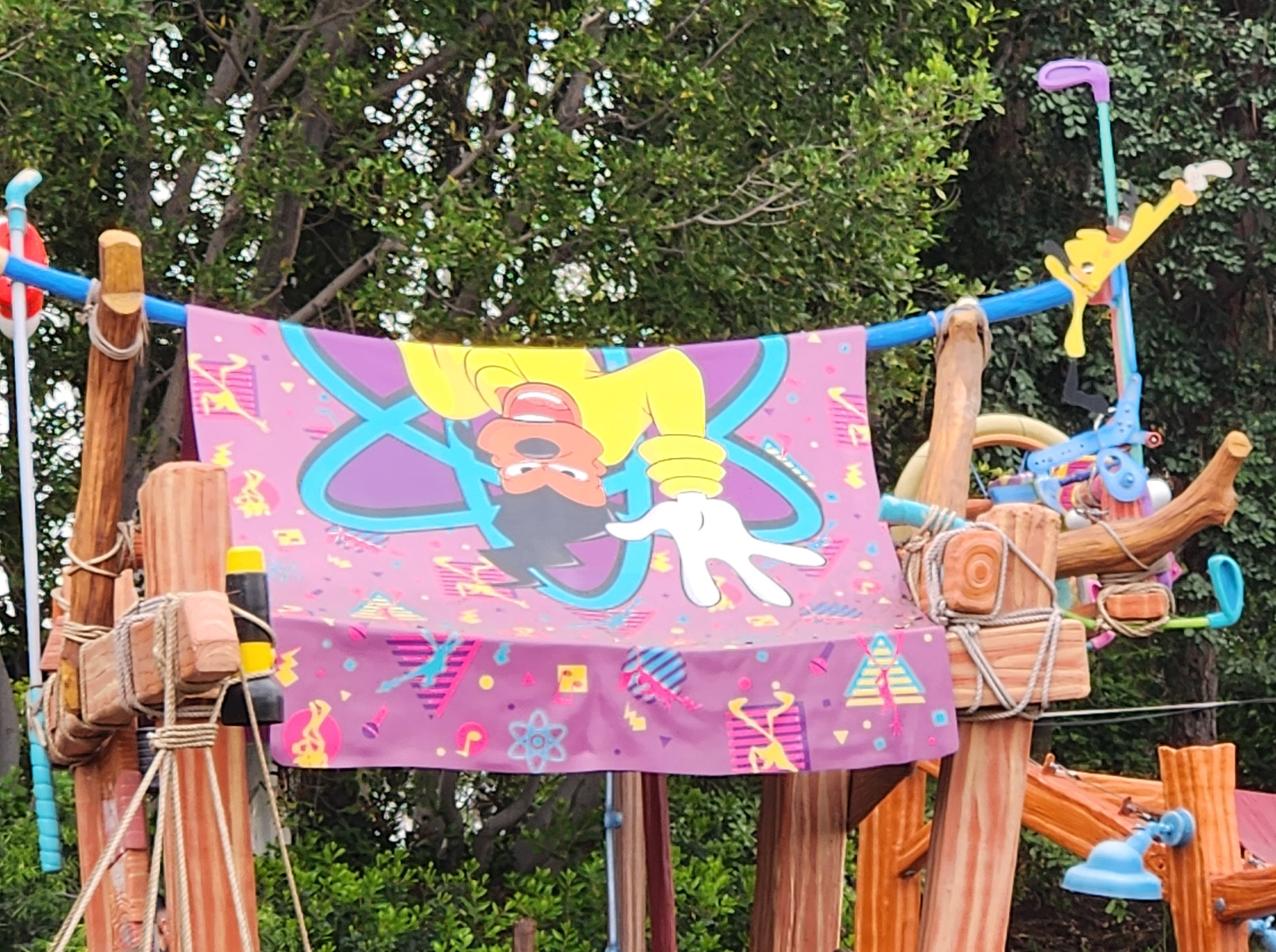
References to Powerline can be found at Goofy's How-To-Play Yard in Mickey's Toontown at Disneyland.

In 2009, a YouTube video that re-created the musical number "After Today" in live action was uploaded, gaining popularity and amassed 5.7 million views as of April 2020. In 2015, a 20th-anniversary reunion for the film was held at the D23 Expo at Anaheim Convention Center in Anaheim, California. The reunion became one of the largest panels at D23, with 500 people in attendance, forcing the expo to turn away some due to lack of seating. The 2017 reboot of the DuckTales series featured an episode in which Goofy appears and shows off a picture of Max and Roxanne on a date.

In 2019, Disneyland held a 1990s-themed throwback night that included a line to meet Max dressed up as Powerline, becoming the longest line of the night. In 2020, a TikTok dance craze inspired by Powerline's "I 2 I" musical number became a popular trend on the platform. The same year, D23 Expo hosted a virtual Disney+ viewing party to celebrate its 25th anniversary, featuring Farmer, Lima, and Magon. The eighth episode of Atlanta's fourth season in 2022, titled "The Goof Who Sat By the Door", was a mockumentary about the making of the film. Since March 19, 2023, Mickey's Toontown section of Disneyland includes a newly orchestrated instrumental version of "I 2 I" and features several references to the film. In 2025, A Goofy Movie was shown with several screenings at Fork 'n Film, serving audiences food from the film. All of the screenings for the film were sold out.

=== Documentary ===
In 2020, director Christopher Ninness told producer Scott Seibold that he wanted to make a documentary about the making of one of his favorite films A Goofy Movie. A year later, they interviewed several filmmakers, including Lima, to discover behind-the-scenes footage. After testing, Disney became involved, and Don Hahn became the executive producer of the film. Entitled Not Just a Goof, the film detailed its production and eventual cult status. It also included interviews with animators and voice actors. Directed by Christopher Ninness and Lima's nephew Eric Kimelton, the film premiered in May 2024 at the DocLands Film Festival. It was released to Disney+ on April 7, 2025, to coincide with the film's 30th anniversary.

=== Sequel ===
A direct-to-video sequel An Extremely Goofy Movie was released on DVD and VHS on February 29, 2000.
