= Avalanche Software =

American video game developer

- Type: Subsidiary
- Industry: Video games
- Founded: October 1995; 31 years ago
- Founder: John Blackburn
- Headquarters: Salt Lake City, Utah, US
- Key people: John Blackburn (CEO)
- Products: Tak and the Power of Juju; Toy Story 3; Disney Infinity; Hogwarts Legacy
- Parent: Disney Interactive Studios (2005–2016); Warner Bros. Games (2017–present)
- Website: avalanchesoftware.com

Avalanche Software is an American video game developer and subsidiary of Warner Bros. Games based in Salt Lake City, Utah. It was founded in October 1995 by four programmers formerly of Sculptured Software, including John Blackburn, who is chief executive officer. The studio was acquired by the games arm of the Walt Disney Company in May 2005, and spent the next ten years developing Disney-related titles, including the video game adaptation of Toy Story 3 (2010), and the toys-to-life game Disney Infinity (2013). In May 2016, due to a declining toys-to-life games market, Disney decided to close the games arm, including Avalanche. Warner Bros. Games acquired the studio and re-opened it in January 2017.

== History ==
Avalanche Software was founded by four programmers formerly of Sculptured Software, including John Blackburn. After Sculptured Software had been acquired by Acclaim Entertainment, the four had been in contact with another former Sculptured Software staffer who left the year prior for Saffire. The four were interested in joining Saffire, which was seeking programmers for an upcoming project, but did not want to commute to the company's offices in Pleasant Grove. Instead, Saffire's owner convinced them to start their own company. Subsequently, Blackburn and his acquaintances established Avalanche in October 1995, with Blackburn becoming the company's president.

On April 19, 2005, Buena Vista Games (later renamed Disney Interactive Studios), the video game publishing arm of the Walt Disney Company, announced that it had acquired Avalanche for an undisclosed price. Buena Vista Games established a sister studio to Avalanche, Fall Line Studio, in November 2006. The studio was merged into Avalanche in January 2009. In January 2013, Avalanche unveiled the toys-to-life cross-platform game Disney Infinity. On May 10, 2016, due to a lack of growth in the toys-to-life market and increasing development costs, Disney discontinued Disney Infinity and closed down Disney Interactive Studios, including Avalanche. Many former Avalanche workers were hired by castAR to create a new studio in Salt Lake City.

On January 24, 2017, Warner Bros. Interactive Entertainment (now Warner Bros. Games) announced that it had acquired and re-opened the studio, with Blackburn returning as its chief executive officer. The studio's first title under the new ownership was Cars 3: Driven to Win.

In February 2021, game director Troy Leavitt received backlash for his social media posts that supported cultural appropriation and Gamergate. This led to his resignation from Avalanche Software and the Hogwarts Legacy project. He claimed that his exit was not a result of the criticism, and Warner Bros. chose not to address the situation.

Hogwarts Legacy was released in 2023 as Avalanche's first non-Disney game since it was acquired by Warner Bros. Games. The open-world action role-playing game was published by the publisher Portkey Games, which is also owned by Warner Bros. Games. The game was officially announced as part of the PlayStation 5 Showcase on September 16, 2020 and was subsequently named "Star of the Evening" by the daily newspaper Die Welt. It has been released for PlayStation 5, Xbox Series X/S, Windows, PlayStation 4, Xbox One, Nintendo Switch, and Nintendo Switch 2.

== Games developed ==
Year	Title	Platform(s)
1996	Ultimate Mortal Kombat 3	Sega Genesis, Super Nintendo Entertainment System
1996	Mortal Kombat Trilogy	PlayStation
1996	2 on 2 Open Ice Challenge	PlayStation
1997	Mortal Kombat Mythologies: Sub-Zero	Nintendo 64
1998	Off Road Challenge	Nintendo 64
1999	Rampage 2: Universal Tour	PlayStation, Nintendo 64
1999	NFL Blitz 2000	Dreamcast
1999	NBA Showtime: NBA on NBC	Dreamcast
2000	Rampage Through Time	PlayStation
2000	Rugrats in Paris: The Movie	PlayStation, Nintendo 64
2000	NFL Blitz 2001	Dreamcast
2000	Prince of Persia: Arabian Nights	Dreamcast
2001	NCAA College Football 2K2: Road to the Rose Bowl	Dreamcast
2002	NCAA College Football 2K3	GameCube, PlayStation 2, Xbox
2002	Rugrats: Royal Ransom	GameCube, PlayStation 2
2003	Tak and the Power of Juju	GameCube, PlayStation 2
2004	Tak 2: The Staff of Dreams	GameCube, PlayStation 2, Xbox
2005	Tak: The Great Juju Challenge	GameCube, PlayStation 2, Xbox
2005	Dragon Ball Z: Sagas	GameCube, PlayStation 2, Xbox
2005	Chicken Little	GameCube, PlayStation 2, Xbox, Microsoft Windows
2006	25 to Life	PlayStation 2, Xbox, Microsoft Windows
2006	Disney's Chicken Little: Ace in Action	PlayStation 2, Wii, Microsoft Windows
2007	Meet the Robinsons	GameCube, PlayStation 2, Xbox 360, Wii, Microsoft Windows
2007	Hannah Montana: Spotlight World Tour	PlayStation 2, Wii
2008	Bolt	PlayStation 2, PlayStation 3, Xbox 360, Wii, Microsoft Windows
2010	Toy Story 3	PlayStation 3, PlayStation 4, PlayStation 5, Xbox 360, Xbox One, Xbox Series X/S, Wii, Nintendo Switch, Nintendo Switch 2, Microsoft Windows
2011	Cars 2	PlayStation 3, Xbox 360, Wii, Microsoft Windows
2013	Disney Infinity	PlayStation 3, Xbox 360, Wii, Wii U, Microsoft Windows
2014	Disney Infinity 2.0	PlayStation 3, PlayStation 4, Xbox 360, Xbox One, Wii U, PlayStation Vita, Microsoft Windows
2015	Disney Infinity 3.0	PlayStation 3, PlayStation 4, Xbox 360, Xbox One, Wii U, Microsoft Windows, Apple TV
2017	Cars 3: Driven to Win	PlayStation 3, PlayStation 4, Xbox 360, Xbox One, Wii U, Nintendo Switch
2023	Hogwarts Legacy	PlayStation 4, PlayStation 5, Xbox One, Xbox Series X/S, Nintendo Switch, Nintendo Switch 2, Microsoft Windows
