= Not Just a Goof =

2025 documentary film

- Film poster
- Directed by: Eric Kimelton; Christopher Ninness
- Written by: Eric Kimelton; Christopher Ninness; Mason Trueblood
- Produced by: Eric Kimelton; Christopher Ninness; Scott Seibold
- Narrated by: Christopher Ninness
- Cinematography: Eric Kimelton; Christopher Ninness
- Edited by: Eric Kimelton; Christopher Ninness
- Music by: Cameron Chambers
- Production company: Scenic CNEK
- Distributed by: Disney+
- Release dates: May 4, 2024 (DocLands); April 7, 2025 (Disney+)
- Running time: 87 minutes
- Country: United States
- Language: English

Not Just a Goof is a 2024 American documentary film about the 1995 animated film A Goofy Movie, which garnered a cult following. The documentary is written, produced, shot, edited, and directed by Eric Kimelton and Christopher Ninness with animated sequences by the Colombia-based Venturia Animation Studios. It premiered at the DocLands Documentary Film Festival on May 4, 2024. It was released on Disney+ on April 7, 2025, exactly 30 years after A Goofy Movie was released.

== Featured interviewees ==
- Kevin Lima - director
- Gregory Perler - editor
- Steve Moore - story artist
- Dan Rounds - producer
- Brian Pimental - head of story
- Bruce W. Smith - character designer
- Bill Farmer - voice of Goofy
- Jason Marsden - voice of Max Goof
- David Z - music producer

=== Archive footage ===
- Jeffrey Katzenberg
- Nancy Beiman - animator
- Chris Urie - story artist
- Gary Krisel - head of Walt Disney Television Animation
- Jymn Magon - screenwriter
- Jim Cummings - voice of Pete
- Rob Paulsen - voice of PJ
- Jenna von Oÿ - voice of Stacey
- Jamie Thomason - casting director
- Kellie Martin - voice of Roxanne
- Frank Welker - voice of Bigfoot
- Larry Leker - story artist
- Paul and Gaëtan Brizzi - animators
- Tevin Campbell - voice of Powerline
- Rosie Gaines - backup vocals for Powerline

== Production and release ==
Initially, the film was going to focus solely on the impact A Goofy Movie had on millennials. Eric Kimelton, one of the filmmakers, is the nephew of director Kevin Lima.

A version of the film was first screened as part of a Disney Vacation Club Members' Cruise on May 20, 2024, at the Walt Disney Family Museum in San Francisco on June 29, 2024. Parts of the film were also previewed in August 2024 during D23: The Ultimate Disney Fan Event. Prior to the film's premiere on Disney+, a near-completed cut of the documentary was shown on October 12, 2024, at the Tarrytown Music Hall in Tarrytown, New York as a surprise addition to the Sleepy Hollow International Film Festival, where D23 held a screening of The Adventures of Ichabod and Mr. Toad earlier in the day.

In March 2025, it was announced the film would be released on April 7, 2025, on Disney+ in the US to coincide with the 30th anniversary of A Goofy Movie with Odin's Eye Entertainment handling international sales.

== Reception ==
On the review aggregator website Rotten Tomatoes, 100% of 11 critics' reviews are positive, with an average rating of 7.4/10.

Ross Bonaime of Collider gave the film a score of 8 out of 10, writing, "A Goofy Movie remains an understated film in the Disney animated film canon, and Not Just a Goof wonderfully reminds us why this is a film that deserves far more attention than it ever received. While fans will clearly get the most out of this deep dive into this '90s favorite, its structure of a David trying to succeed in a studio of Goliaths is worth it even for non-fans. Not Just a Goof gives this often-forgotten gem of Disney the love and respect it deserves after all these years."

Brian Orndorf of Blu-ray.com also gave the film a score of 8 out of 10 and wrote, "Not Just a Goof is enlightening and charming, as directors Eric Kimelton and Christopher Ninness find their way into the production story, armed with wonderful footage of the creative process and access to cast and crew, making for an engrossing sit."
