= Rick Stoner =

Publication information
- Publisher: Marvel Comics
- First appearance: Fury #1 (May 1994)
- Created by: Barry Dutter; M.C. Wyman

In-story information
- Full name: Richard "Rick" Andrew Stoner
- Team affiliations: S.H.I.E.L.D. United States Army; Central Intelligence Agency
- Notable aliases: Fallen Angel

Colonel Richard Stoner is a fictional secret agent appearing in American comic books published by Marvel Comics. The character, created by Barry Dutter and M.C. Wyman, first appeared in Fury #1 (May 1994).

Rick Stoner was played by Patrick Warburton in the Marvel Cinematic Universe TV series Agents of S.H.I.E.L.D.'s fifth and seventh seasons.

== Fictional character biography ==
Rick Stoner was a hard man who always stuck to the rules and showed much disdain towards his fellow World War II soldiers, specifically Nick Fury whom he had a love-hate relationship of sorts with. He along with James "Logan" Howlett worked at the C.I.A. and fought Hydra. Stoner was eventually offered the director's seat of the then newly formed S.H.I.E.L.D. Upon looking at the Howling Commandos' dossiers, he told himself that "these jokers will never become S.H.I.E.L.D. agents as long as I'm director". His director status is short lived as he's shot and killed by Hydra while trying to uncover a traitor within S.H.I.E.L.D.

This turned out to be a cover up with Stoner actually having been disavowed and abandoned by S.H.I.E.L.D., plotting revenge against Fury for taking his job. Now under the Fallen Angel codename, he plots to use a project to manipulate reality. Stoner and Fury have a battle over the project, ending up trapped in a pocket universe. Fury ultimately prevails while Stoner is killed.

== In other media ==
Rick Stoner appears in Agents of S.H.I.E.L.D., portrayed by Patrick Warburton. This version is a military general from the 1970s. Additionally, according to Daniel Sousa, he was also known as "Little Ricky", a junior agent who "couldn't tell the difference between a clip and a mag." A prerecorded holographic message of Stoner for a then-uninhabited S.H.I.E.L.D. base called the Lighthouse appears in the season five episodes "All the Comforts of Home" and "Option Two" before an alternate timeline version of Stoner appears in the season seven episodes "A Trout in the Milk" and "Adapt or Die".
