= Tak and the Guardians of Gross =

2008 video game

- Developer: Blitz Games
- Publisher: THQ
- Director: Chris Viggers
- Producer: Team RocFISH
- Designers: Mike Bithell; Mike Chapman; Alex Johnson; Luke Nockles; Peter Theophilus; Mark Witts
- Programmers: Steve Bond; Alastair Graham; Andy Keeble; Simon Offord; David Waby; David Woo
- Artists: Wai-Hung Wan; Shakeel Alli; Nicholas Miles; Duncan Nimmo
- Writer: Myles McLeod
- Composers: Matt Black; Todd Baker; Edward Hargrave
- Series: Tak
- Engine: BlitzTech
- Platforms: PlayStation 2, Wii
- Release: NA: October 13, 2008; AU: October 23, 2008; EU: October 31, 2008
- Genres: Action-adventure, platformer
- Modes: Single-player, multiplayer

Tak and the Guardians of Gross is a platform video game developed by Blitz Games and published by THQ for Wii and PlayStation 2 in 2008. It is the fourth title in the Tak series following Tak: The Great Juju Challenge.

== Plot ==
Tak complains about Jibolba making him clean the Spoiled Shrine. Jeera offers to take the J-Runner, but Tak wants to take a shortcut through the jungle. Despite Keeko's warning, Tak goes anyway. After going through a long trail full of Woodie Tribesmen, Tak makes it to the shrine. He accidentally destroys a giant gem housed in the shrine, freeing four beasts imprisoned within it known as the Big Gs.

When Tak goes back to the village, Jibolba tells Tak that whoever did this must see the four Jujus known as the Guardians of Gross. First Tak sees Debris Juju, and receives Lumpy Magic. He then sets out for the first G, Trashthulu. After a long trail, he uses a catapult to launch onto Trashthulu. When he lands, he uses Lumpy Magic to make it to the head of the beast. Once inside, he grabs the essence gem of the beast, jabbing his staff into the eyes to defeat him. When both eyes are handled, Tak jumps out, and the beast turns to stone and collapses.

Tak goes to Icky Juju, and receives Slime Magic. Tak surfs through a river of slime onto Slopviathan. He pumps the eyes of Slopviathan with Slime and they explode. He then grabs the essence, and jumps off as Slopviathan turns to stone. Next, he goes to Melty Juju, who gives Tak Cheesy Magic. He then waits, but is eaten by Gorgonzilla. Tak then starts beating the uvula of the beast. This makes the essence fly off his forehead, and the beast turns to stone and crumbles.

Finally, Tak heads to Stinky Juju, where he gets Stinky Magic. Now, he heads to Stinkolossus by going through another jungle path. Here, he makes it to the beast, and he must fight to the top, while fighting three smaller stink beasts. When he makes it to the top, he is floating on platforms, swirling around the G. He then beats the three smaller beasts again, and then he must shoot the monster's Stink Bombs back at him. This makes him spit out his essence, and Tak escapes.

Now, with all essences, Tak restores the gem. When he is about to put the essences back, Stinky Juju returns to see. Tak trips, inadvertently freeing the Gs again. When Tak thinks all is lost, Stinky Juju tells Tak there is another way. If he can collect slime from all the Gs, and burp, it will defeat the Gs once and for all. Tak does so, defeating the Big Gs.

== Gameplay ==
The game is a linear platformer with a focus on using a series of parkour moves in order to jump over obstacles and run through walls. Several levels are structured around Tak having to find his way across the bodies of each of the Big Gs in a vertical fashion to reach their heads and engage in a boss battle. Between levels, Tak is challenged to mini-games by the Juju guardians to receive additional magical powers, which can be activated during specific levels.

== Reception ==
Reception

Aggregate scores
Aggregator	Score	
Aggregator	PS2	Wii
GameRankings	67%	69.38%
Metacritic	57/100	63/100

Review scores
Publication	Score	
Publication	PS2	Wii
AllGame	2.5/5	2.5/5
GameZone	5.5/10	5.3/10
IGN	6.6/10	6.6/10
NGamer	N/A	71%
Worthplaying	N/A	7/10
Game Vortex	80%	90%
Gaming Age	N/A	5/10
Nintendo-x2	N/A	7/10
HonestGamers	N/A	7/10

The game received "mixed or average" reviews on both platforms according to the review aggregation website Metacritic.
