= Disney's Chicken Little: Ace in Action =

2006 video game

- Developers: Avalanche Software; DC Studios (NDS)
- Publisher: Buena Vista Games (Note: The Windows version was published as Disney Interactive Studios.)
- Director: Troy Leavitt
- Platforms: PlayStation 2, Nintendo DS, Wii, Microsoft Windows
- Release: DS: EU: November 17, 2006; NA: November 21, 2006; AU: May 17, 2007; PlayStation 2: NA: November 21, 2006; EU: December 1, 2006; AU: May 17, 2007; Wii: NA: December 19, 2006; EU: February 23, 2007; AU: September 20, 2007; Windows: EU: 2007; WW: February 24, 2015
- Genres: Action-adventure, platformer
- Mode: Single player

Disney's Chicken Little: Ace in Action is an action-adventure video game based on the 2005 animated film Chicken Little. It was released for PlayStation 2, Nintendo DS, Wii and Windows in 2006.

== Gameplay ==
The gameplay has been described as action-heavy, and compared to the Ratchet & Clank series. Throughout 24 levels in total, players enter sci-fi vehicles and blast enemies with guns, encounter 6 boss fights, and have other gaming experiences. GameSpot described it as having "Smash TV-esque mechanics".

== Plot ==
Inspired by the "superhero movie within the movie" finale of the film, Chicken Little: Ace in Action features Ace, the superhero alter ego of Chicken Little, and the Hollywood versions of his misfit band of friends: Runt, Abby and Fish-Out-of-Water. The crew of the intergalactic Battle Barn faces off against Foxy Loxy and her evil Amazonian sidekick, Goosey Loosey, who have an evil plan to take over Earth. Battle evil alien robots through multiple levels across the Solar System and combat your foes in one of three distinct game play modes: Ace on foot as a soldier, Runt as the driver of an armored tank, or Abby as the pilot of a spaceship. The original incarnations of Chicken Little and his friends Abby, Runt, and Fish are featured in cutscenes throughout the game.

== Development ==
The video game was produced as the second in Disney's Chicken Little franchise, which at the time was planned to be expanded into various forms of media including a film sequel. The game was based on the "movie within the movie" finale sequence that concludes the film, and serves as an origin story for the in-universe fictional character "Ace" Chicken. A fourth-wall framing reference was chosen which sees Chicken Little and his friends playing Ace in Action and commenting on it. The game was officially announced at the 2006 E3.

== Reception ==
Reception

Aggregate scores
Aggregator	Score
GameRankings	(PS2) 71.40% (Wii) 70.77% (DS) 67.67%
Metacritic	(Wii) 72/100 (PS2) 69/100 (DS) 66/100

Review scores
Publication	Score
Eurogamer	7/10
Game Informer	7.25/10
GameZone	(PS2) 7.2/10 (Wii) 7/10 (DS) 6.9/10
IGN	(Wii) 7.6/10 (PS2) 7.5/10 (DS) 7/10
Nintendo Power	(Wii) 7/10 (DS) 6.5/10
Official U.S. PlayStation Magazine	7.5/10
PALGN	7/10
VideoGamer.com	6/10
X-Play	2/5

Ace in Action was met with average to mixed reception upon release. GameRankings and Metacritic gave it a score of 71.40% and 69 out of 100 for the PS2 version; 70.77% and 72 out of 100 for the Wii version; and 67.67% and 66 out of 100 for the DS version.

Chris Adams of IGN lamented that the Nintendo DS version of the game comes close to greatness without ever achieving it, giving it a final score of 7. The company gave the Wii version a 7.6, describing it as "one part Ratchet & Clank, one part Adam West, and one part IR control".
