= Tak: The Great Juju Challenge =

2005 video game

- Developers: Avalanche Software (GC, PS2, Xbox); Altron (Nintendo DS); WayForward Technologies (Game Boy Advance)
- Publisher: THQ
- Producer: Nickelodeon
- Writer: Randolph Heard
- Series: Tak
- Platforms: GameCube; Game Boy Advance; Nintendo DS; PlayStation 2; Xbox
- Release: NA: September 19, 2005; PAL: September 19, 2005 (GC); PAL: March 3, 2006 (DS, PS2, Xbox); PAL: March 9, 2006 (GBA)
- Genres: Platform, action-adventure
- Modes: Single-player, multiplayer

Tak: The Great Juju Challenge is a platform video game developed by Avalanche Software and published by THQ for the GameCube, Game Boy Advance, Nintendo DS, PlayStation 2 and Xbox in 2005. It is the sequel to Tak 2: The Staff of Dreams and the third installment to the Tak and the Power of Juju series.

== Plot ==
Jibolba summons the player and tells them that the Pupanunu Village is the host of the Great Juju Challenge, the first in 60 years. Meanwhile, in Feathercrag, Tak and Lok are looking for a Phoenix so they can get a feather to enter the challenge. After fighting Woodies and learning their powers, they catch up with the Phoenix, which is grabbed by two unknown men. However, Lok is able to grab a feather.

When they arrive to the Juju Realm for the challenges, the Moon Juju introduces the competitors: Team Jibba Jabba, Team Grammazon, Team Pupanunu, and Team Black Mist. After completing the first three challenges, the teams compete in a Proving Grounds match, during which Black Mist is eliminated. However, they return with the Two-Headed Juju who reveals that they messed up the scoring, and the Black Mist is back in.

Once again, they must go through three challenges, and then another Proving Grounds. Once again, Black Mist is eliminated. They once again return with Flora and Fauna, who found Grammazon teeth in the Salt Lick of Performance Enhancement, so they are eliminated instead. Before the next match, Tak and Lok see Bartog and Crug talking to an unknown Juju. After three more challenges, the Proving Grounds match is played, but Jibba Jabba is eliminated. After the match, Bartog and Crug talk about destroying the Pupanunu Village once they win. Tak and Lok decide to beat them to prevent them from doing so.

On a return visit to the Gates of Nocturne, Tak and Lok find Crug tied up. He reveals that they have been cheating with the Dark Juju, and the Juju and Bartog cut the weakest link, Crug. Crug knows a good way to do better than Black Mist. He tells them to go to Caster's Hill. Once there, Crug realizes that is not there. Next, they go to Ambush Grove, where Tak and Lok find a collapsed Crug. He reveals that he defeated an invisible lizard to get the Ancient Hammer of Handy Juju, which he gives to Lok.

After, Tak and Lok meet Bartog, "Crug", and the Moon Juju in the Proving Grounds. During this, the Dark Juju reveals himself and announces his love for the Moon Juju. After three rounds, Tak and Lok win, and they keep the favor of the Moon Juju.

== Gameplay ==
The gameplay is an obstacle course with a timer counting down. Tak and Lok try to reach the exit with the least time possible. The score depends on the time, items collected and enemies defeated. The game can either be played one player who switches between Tak and Lok or by playing two player with a friend each controlling a character on a split screen.

== Reception ==
Reception

Aggregate scores
Aggregator	Score				
Aggregator	DS	GBA	GameCube	PS2	Xbox
GameRankings	66.33%	61.25%	73.39%	72.70%	75.15%
Metacritic	66/100	52/100	75/100	74/100	75/100

Review scores
Publication	Score				
Publication	DS	GBA	GameCube	PS2	Xbox
Game Informer	N/A	N/A	N/A	7/10	7/10
GameSpot	7.2/10	N/A	6.2/10	6.2/10	6.2/10
GameSpy	N/A	2/5	4/5	4/5	4/5
GameZone	6.3/10	7.5/10	7.5/10	7.9/10	7.9/10
IGN	6.2/10	N/A	8/10	8/10	8/10
Jeuxvideo.com	11/20	9/20	13/20	13/20	N/A
Nintendo Power	7/10	4/10	8.5/10	N/A	N/A
Official U.S. PlayStation Magazine	N/A	N/A	N/A	3/5	N/A
Official Xbox Magazine (UK)	N/A	N/A	N/A	N/A	7/10
VideoGamer.com	N/A	N/A	5/10	5/10	5/10
The Sydney Morning Herald	N/A	N/A	N/A	4/5	N/A

The GameCube, PlayStation 2 and Xbox versions received "generally favorable reviews", while the DS and Game Boy Advance versions received "mixed or average reviews", according to the review aggregation website Metacritic.

Despite the mixed reception, the Academy of Interactive Arts & Sciences nominated The Great Juju Challenge for "Children's Game of the Year" during the 9th Annual Interactive Achievement Awards. The game was also nominated for Best Animated Video Game at the 33rd Annie Awards.
