= Tak 2: The Staff of Dreams =

2004 video game

- Developers: Avalanche Software (GCN, PS2, Xbox); Helixe (GBA)
- Publisher: THQ
- Producer: Nickelodeon
- Writer: Randolph Heard
- Series: Tak
- Platforms: Game Boy Advance; GameCube; PlayStation 2; Xbox
- Release: NA: October 11, 2004; AU: March 11, 2005; EU: March 24, 2005
- Genres: Action-adventure, platformer
- Modes: Single-player, multiplayer

Tak 2: The Staff of Dreams is a 2004 platform video game developed by Avalanche Software and published by THQ for the GameCube, Game Boy Advance, PlayStation 2 and Xbox. It is the sequel to Tak and the Power of Juju and the second installment of the Tak and the Power of Juju series. The PS2 version was released via the PlayStation Network as a "PS2 Classic" in November 2011 but it was later taken off the store due to THQ's bankruptcy in 2013.

== Gameplay ==
The gameplay is almost identical to the first game, with differences being that Tak's weapon is not always on hand, and that mana is represented by a meter and not a feather count. Tak gets aid from animals, a number of which did not appear in the first game. In this game, Tak's juju magic is triggered by holding down one button and pressing combos of other buttons. Tak also earns juju powers gradually throughout the game instead of having to seek them out.

== Plot ==
Following the events of the first game, Tak is trapped in the Dream World for sixteen days as Jibolba and Lok ponder how to awaken him. The Dream Juju tells Tak that he must fight the Dream Guardian and retrieve the Staff of Dreams to escape the Dream World.

During his quest, Tak periodically escapes the Dream World via rifts, enabling Jibolba to accompany him. The two rescue Jibolba's brother JB, who helps Tak enter the tower where the Dream Guardian resides.

Tak obtains the Staff of Dreams, but the Dream Juju reveals himself to be his old enemy Tlaloc and the princess to be his henchmen, Pins and Needles. Tlaloc obtains half of the staff, the Staff of Nightmares, while Tak gets the other, the Dream Shaker. This power causes all to enter the real world, and Pins, Needles, and Tlaloc escape. Tak chases them, but is knocked out.

The Moon Juju visits Tak and empowers him to battle the villains. Tlaloc is killed in battle, but he returns as a nightmare creature and transforms into a monster resembling the Dream Guardian. After Tak defeats Tlaloc, the Dream Guardian returns him to the real world. Afterwards, Jibolba and Lok wake Tak up, telling him that the previous events were a dream. The three walk off while being spied on by a sheep from Tlaloc's army.

== Reception ==
Reception

Aggregate scores
Aggregator	Score			
Aggregator	GBA	GameCube	PS2	Xbox
GameRankings	56%	75.48%	72.87%	75.34%
Metacritic	45/100	75/100	71/100	73/100

Review scores
Publication	Score			
Publication	GBA	GameCube	PS2	Xbox
Game Informer	N/A	7.25/10	7.25/10	7.25/10
GameSpot	N/A	6.7/10	6.7/10	6.7/10
GameSpy	N/A	3.5/5	3.5/5	3.5/5
GameZone	N/A	8.8/10	8.3/10	7.9/10
IGN	5.5/10	8.4/10	8.4/10	8.4/10
Jeuxvideo.com	11/20	14/20	14/20	14/20
Nintendo Power	N/A	4.2/5	N/A	N/A
Official U.S. PlayStation Magazine	N/A	N/A	3.5/5	N/A
Official Xbox Magazine (US)	N/A	N/A	N/A	7.6/10
X-Play	N/A	3/5	3/5	N/A
The Sydney Morning Herald	N/A	2.5/5	2.5/5	2.5/5

Tak 2: The Staff of Dreams was given "generally favorable reviews" for the GameCube version, "mixed or average reviews" for the PlayStation 2 and Xbox versions, and "generally unfavorable reviews" for the Game Boy Advance version, according to Metacritic.

The game shipped nearly 1 million units.

== Sequel ==
A third sequel to the series, titled Tak: The Great Juju Challenge was released for the GameCube, Game Boy Advance, Nintendo DS, PlayStation 2 and Xbox in 2005.
