= 101 Dalmatians =

101 Dalmatians may refer to:

- The Hundred and One Dalmatians, a 1956 novel written by Dodie Smith
- 101 Dalmatians (franchise), a Disney film franchise based on the novel
  - One Hundred and One Dalmatians, a 1961 animated film based on the novel
  - 101 Dalmatians (1996 film), a live-action remake of the 1961 film
  - 101 Dalmatians: Escape from DeVil Manor, a 1997 video game based on the 1996 film
  - 101 Dalmatians: The Series, a Disney television series that aired from 1997 to 1998
  - 101 Dalmatians II: Patch's London Adventure, a 2003 direct-to-video sequel to the 1961 film
  - 101 Dalmatian Street, a 2019 television series that focuses on the descendants of Pongo and Perdita
- The 101 Dalmatians Musical, a 2009 stage musical written by Dennis DeYoung and B.T. McNicholl
- 101 Dalmatians (2022 musical), a 2022 stage musical by Zinnie Harris and Douglas Hodge

== See also ==
- 102 Dalmatians, a 2000 film and sequel to the 1996 live-action film
- Disney's 102 Dalmatians: Puppies to the Rescue, a 2000 video game based on the 2000 film
- The Starlight Barking, a 1967 novel written by Dodie Smith and the sequel to The Hundred and One Dalmatians
