= I Capture the Castle =

1948 novel by Dodie Smith

- First British edition, William Heinemann, 1949
- Author: Dodie Smith
- Illustrator: Ruth Steed, from sketches by the author
- Language: English
- Genre: Novel
- Set in: Suffolk and London, 1930s
- Publisher: William Heinemann (UK); McClelland and Stewart (CA); Little, Brown (US)
- Publication date: 1948
- Publication place: United Kingdom, United States, Canada
- Media type: Print: hardback
- OCLC: 24724940
- Dewey Decimal: 823.914

I Capture the Castle is Dodie Smith's first novel, written during the Second World War when she and her husband Alec Beesley, a conscientious objector, moved from their native England to Pennsylvania. Smith was already an established playwright and later became famous for writing the children's classic The Hundred and One Dalmatians.

The novel concerns an eccentric family struggling to live in genteel poverty in a decaying castle during the 1930s. The first-person narrator is Cassandra Mortmain, who tells the story through her journal. It is a coming-of-age story in which Cassandra becomes a young woman and experiences her first love.

In 2003 the novel was listed at number 82 in the BBC's survey The Big Read.

== Plot ==
The novel takes place between April and October in a single year in the 1930s. Ten years before, widower James Mortmain took out a forty-year repairing lease on a dilapidated but beautiful castle, hoping it would inspire him and cure his writer's block. He has been unable to write anything since the success of his first book, Jacob Wrestling (a reference to Jacob wrestling with the angel), an innovative and "difficult" modernist novel that made his name internationally. So far, his family has survived on royalties from that book, but they are dwindling to nothing. Now they are selling off the furniture to buy food.

His family consists of:

- His second wife, Topaz, a celebrated artist's model who enjoys communing with nature, sometimes wearing nothing but hip boots. At 'almost thirty', she fears that her best years are behind her.
- Daughter Rose (21), a stunning redhead. She dreams of finding a rich, handsome husband to rescue them from poverty.
- Daughter Cassandra (17), the first-person narrator of the novel. An aspiring author, she devotes her time to "capturing" everything around her in her journal.
- Son Thomas (15), who is considered "tolerably bright" and has won a full scholarship to a good school.
- Stephen Colley (18), their "man of all work". He is the golden-haired, loyal son of the Mortmain late maid. Unpaid by the family, he even helps support them by hiring himself out to a local farmer. Stephen, a "noble soul," is in love with Cassandra, which she finds touching but awkward.

As the novel opens, Rose and Cassandra learn that their new landlords are two rich and handsome young American brothers, who have arrived at nearby Scoatney Hall.

- Younger brother Neil, raised in California by their English father, is a carefree young man who wants to become a rancher in the United States.
- Older brother Simon, who grew up in New England with his mother, is scholarly and serious, and loves the English countryside. As the elder brother he is richer, being the heir to the Cotton fortune.

Rose determines to marry Simon, declaring she would marry the Devil himself to escape poverty.

The brothers are excited to meet James Mortmain, whose book they admire, and are amused by the eccentric, bohemian family. However, when they pay a call the following day, Rose flirts blatantly with Simon and makes herself look ridiculous. Both brothers are repelled by this display and, as they walk away, Cassandra overhears them resolving to drop all acquaintance. After an amusing episode involving a fur coat, however, all is forgiven and the two families become good friends. Cassandra and Topaz scheme to make Rose's wish come true by getting Simon to fall in love with her and propose. The plan succeeds.

While Rose and Topaz are in London with Mrs Cotton to purchase Rose's wedding trousseau, Cassandra and Simon spend the evening together, and they kiss. Cassandra becomes obsessed with Simon. She suffers terrible guilt since he is Rose's fiancé, but she also begins to have misgivings about the marriage, since Rose's letters are full of the luxuries she's enjoying, with no mention of Simon at all.

Stephen, noticing Cassandra's unhappiness, offers to marry her. She declines saying she doesn't love him, and encourages him in his emerging career as a model and film actor. She and Thomas concoct a scheme to help their father overcome his writer's block by the drastic expedient of imprisoning him in a medieval tower.

Meanwhile, unnoticed by everyone but Stephen, Rose and Neil have been falling in love. When they eventually elope, Simon is left heartbroken, but Cassandra becomes hopeful. Before Simon returns to the States, he comes to see her. Cassandra deflects the conversation at a moment when she thinks he is about to propose, in the belief that he is still in love with Rose. The book closes on an ambiguous note, with Cassandra reminding herself that Simon has promised to return and closing her journal for good by reasserting her love for him.

== Adaptations ==
- Smith adapted her novel into a two-act play "with musical notes" in 1954.
- In 1963 Walt Disney Productions announced plans to film the novel with Hayley Mills as Cassandra. They ultimately dropped the project (while retaining film rights), when Smith and screenwriter Sally Benson did not get along. Mills grew too old for the part before the project could be revived.
- Disney denied film rights to any other studio until intense legal leveraging in the late 1990s after Smith's death, which eventually resulted in the 2003 BBC Film production, directed by Tim Fywell for BBC Films.
- In November 2015, a BBC Radio 4 adaption was broadcast, dramatised by Jane Rogers and directed by Nadia Molinari. It starred Holliday Grainger as Cassandra and Toby Jones as Mortmain.
- A musical adaptation with book and lyrics by Teresa Howard and music by Steven Edis received its staged premiere at the Watford Palace Theatre in April 2017. It was directed by Brigid Larmour.
- A musical adaptation with lyrics by Marion Adler, score by Peter Foley, and book by Cara Reichel was commissioned by Signature Theatre's American Musical Voices Project: Next Generation (Arlington, Virginia) and given staged readings in 2013 at Pace New Musicals (Pace University, New York, New York).

== Critical reception ==
On 5 November 2019, the BBC News listed I Capture the Castle on its list of the 100 most inspiring novels.

I Capture the Castle was cited by Armistead Maupin as an influence on his novel Maybe the Moon, which he also structured as a diary.
