= The Starlight Barking =

1967 children's novel by Dodie Smith

- First edition
- Author: Dodie Smith
- Language: English
- Genre: Children's novel
- Publisher: William Heinemann Ltd. (United States)
- Publication date: 1967
- Publication place: United Kingdom
- Media type: Print (hardback & paperback)
- Pages: 144
- OCLC: 65203616
- Preceded by: The Hundred and One Dalmatians

The Starlight Barking is a 1967 children's novel by Dodie Smith. It is a sequel to the 1956 novel The Hundred and One Dalmatians.

== Plot ==
The Dearly family and most of the Dalmatians of the first book still live in Cruella de Vil's old manor house in Suffolk, as do many of the other rescued Dalmatians and a married couple of White Persian cats. Mr. Dearly has allowed some dogs to go to new masters, including giving Cadpig to the Prime Minister.

One morning, the dogs find all other living things besides dogs cannot be wakened. No dog is hungry, thirsty, or weak. Doors, gates, and machines operate on command, and the dogs are able to communicate via "thought waves" to others many miles away. Cadpig, now acting Prime Minister in the humans' absence, orders her parents to come help her in London, where hundreds of dogs are arriving awaiting her advice.

The dogs discover they can "swoosh", or hover at tremendous speed over the ground. Pongo and Missis select a squad of fifty Dalmatians, including their adult sons Patch, Lucky, and Roly Poly. They "swoosh" to London and are escorted by Police Dogs to 10 Downing Street. Cadpig and her Cabinet (the human Cabinet's dogs) hold a meeting with Pongo and Missis to decide what to do next. Roly Poly makes a friend of George, the Foreign Secretary's Boxer, and the two set off to adventure together.

Two Fox Terriers hear the General (the Old English Sheepdog) barking; he reveals he will soon be arriving with his owner's little son Tommy, the farm tabby Mrs. Willow, and the female White Persian Cat. These three are also awake, thanks to being named "honorary dogs" after the events of the first book. Upon arrival in London, the White Persian Cat suggests Cruella, now back in London, must be behind the mysterious sleeping. She leads a group of dogs to Cruella's house to kill her. However, Cruella and her husband are just as fast asleep as anyone else, and the animals see she is now obsessed with metallic plastics instead of fur coats. They spare her life and return to Downing Street, where the television comes on and a strange Voice orders them to make sure all dogs are in open, starlit spaces by midnight. The Dalmatians accomplish this via Twilight Barking and thought waves.

In Trafalgar Square, Tommy, the cats, the Dalmatians, and the General meet with thousands of other dogs to wait. At Midnight, after a strange euphoric moment followed by a moment of terror, Sirius, the Lord of the Dog Star, appears on Nelson's Column. He explains to all the dogs that he is lonely and is offering them the chance to avoid the pain of possible nuclear war in the future. However, they must come with him of their own accord. He assures them the world, when it wakes, will not remember dogs ever existed, and that all dogs will be free and know true bliss in the stars.

Pongo is chosen to make the final decision. He consults with the Cabinet, Missis, and the General. Three stray dogs approach, and tell Pongo that no "lost" dog wants to give up their last chance of finding special humans of their own by leaving Earth. This convinces Pongo and the others to choose their masters over Sirius. While Sirius commends their loyalty to humankind, he is sad that he will have to return to space alone. The dogs promise they will look out for him on nights when the Dog Star is in the sky. Sirius grants them the ability to "swoosh" to their own homes before daybreak, at which time everything will return to normal.

Roly Poly returns from his adventure in Paris with George. He reveals Sirius appeared there as well, and Missis surmises he appeared everywhere at once, as a star is not bound by earthly time. All owned dogs return home, while the "lost" dogs take the opportunity to get in to Battersea Dogs Home, where they will be fed and cared for while awaiting new owners. Pongo talks to Sirius one last time before the dawn and says someday dogs may be ready to leave Earth with him, but for now they will be content to be owned by loving humans, which, for him, is "bliss" enough.

== Characters ==
- Sirius - the powerful, telepathic, but intensely lonely "Lord of the Dog Star", who can assume the form of any breed of dog and has loved dogs for millennia. With the threat of possible nuclear war looming, he fears what will happen to Earth's dogs, and he uses his magic to "freeze" Earth and give the dogs the power to flee with him if they so choose, setting off the events of the novel.
- Pongo - the father of the fifteen puppies from the first novel, now known across London for the famous rescue of the puppies from Cruella de Vil. He is the de facto leader of the Dalmatians and is said to possess the "Keenest Brains in Dogdom", though the strange happenings place him in a position far out of his depth.
- Missis Pongo - known as "Missis" to most. She is more intuitive but less practical than her husband, but just as famous and admired. She grasps the concepts of "magic" and "metaphysical" far better than her husband when the strange happenings occur.
- The General - formerly "The Colonel" in the first novel, before his promotion, the Old English Sheepdog who lives at Tompkins farm next door to Pongo and Missis. He is able to communicate with his owner's son, Tommy Tompkins, in a half-dog half-human babble.
- Cadpig - Pongo and Missis' twelfth-born and smallest puppy. As an adult, she accompanied Mr. Dearly to meet the Prime Minister and indicated she wished to stay at 10 Downing Street with him, becoming famous on TV speeches sitting next to her new master. She becomes Prime Minister during the crisis and is able to handle the situation with her parents' help and her own naturally "bossy" nature.
- Cadpig's Cabinet - the dogs belonging to the Prime Minister's Cabinet, who take over their masters' jobs during the Crisis:
  - George, the Foreign Minister - a fat, clumsy but cosmopolitan Boxer. He and Roly Poly become good friends after realizing they are much alike, and together they take a short visit to Paris. He is named after Foreign Secretary George Brown.
  - Babs, Minister of Transport - a pretty brown Poodle, portrayed in the illustrations as a Standard Poodle, who is very fussy about traffic and crowds and is constantly making regulations. Gay and Lucky help her "dress up" and become her secretaries. She is named after Minister of Transport Barbara Castle.
  - The Chancellor of the Exchequer - never named, a Black Labrador who cannot add and hopes Pongo can teach him how to make two and two into four instead of three.
- Perdita and Prince - a married couple of liver-spotted Dalmatians, and the parents of eight of the stolen puppies from the first novel. They are left in charge of the Dearlys' household while Pongo and Missis go to London.
- Roly Poly - a fat and accident-prone Dalmatian, one of Pongo and Missis' adult sons. He teaches George how to swim, and the two of them soon discover they have a lot in common and spend the day of magic visiting Paris together.
- Patch - Pongo and Missis' son, who was the largest of the puppies and devoted to Cadpig. He refuses to marry as an adult because he does not want to pass on his patched-ear-and-eye fault. He is happily reunited with Cadpig and made her temporary Private Secretary in London.
- Lucky and Gay - Pongo and Missis's most intelligent adult son and his equally clever wife. They become temporary Private Secretaries to Babs the Poodle during the crisis and are the most ready of the group for action.
- Major/Mrs. Willow - formerly Lieutenant Willow in the first novel, before her promotion. She is a farm tabby and the General's strong right paw and closest friend. She was made an honorary dog after her part in the first novel, and thus is immune to the "Mysterious sleep". She openly dislikes Sirius.
- The White Persian Cat - formerly owned and abused by Cruella de Vil, she ran away to live with the Dalmatians and was made an honorary dog, thus making her immune to the "mysterious sleep". She becomes friends with The Staffordshire and also dislikes Sirius.
- The Jack Russell - a feisty and brave Parson Russell Terrier whom the General makes a Lieutenant. He is impertinent and forward but completely loyal to the General.
- The Staffordshire - a powerful, impulsive but good-hearted Staffordshire Bull Terrier. He helped the Dalmatians in the first novel and is reunited with them in London. He initially dislikes cats but becomes an honored friend of The White Persian when he shows he is willing to help her kill Cruella if necessary.
- The Great Dane at Hampstead - owned by a Professor who studies crowd psychology, he suspects Sirius of inciting mass hysteria for nefarious ends, though he soon comes to see this is false.
- Sam - a White Chihuahua, portrayed as a long-haired Chihuahua in the illustrations, who rides on the Dane's back and is owned by the same Professor. He does not speak to anyone but the Dane.
- Sergeant - one of several Police Dogs who help keep order during the crisis. He is stationed in the Prime Minister's bedroom, to guard it and monitor him while he sleeps.
- The Three Strays - a deputation sent to Pongo on behalf of all the lost, stray, abused, and homeless dogs in England. It is their undying hope and desire to one day find loving owners which convinces Pongo and the other dogs to stay with their own masters.
- The White Cat's Husband - another white Persian cat. While a beloved member of the family, he is not made an honorary dog and thus does not wake with his wife. He stretches out and takes over the bed while she is gone, much to her annoyance.
- Humans - none actively speak in the novel, as most are sleeping when the dogs visit and attempt to interact with them.
  - The Prime Minister - Cadpig's beloved owner. She idolized him when he was on TV, and he in turn was so touched by her affection (something he hadn't had for a long time) when they met that he broke down in tears and adopted her.
  - Mr. and Mrs. Dearly - the owners of the Dalmatians in Suffolk. Mr. Dearly wakes at the end of the novel.
  - Nanny Cook and Nanny Butler - the chef and valet of the Dearly household, from the first novel.
  - Cruella de Vil - the villainess of the first novel. She left England to get away from debt, but she and her husband return and start a company manufacturing metallic plastics. She has dyed her hair half-black-half-white, as it changed colour due to stress and shock after the first novel. She still is obsessed with heat and pepper but no longer has her obsession for furs.
  - Mr. de Vil - a small, worried, but equally evil man, from the first novel. He snores louder than anyone the dogs have ever heard.
  - Tommy Tompkins - the only human to be unaffected by the "mysterious sleep" due to having been made an honorary dog after helping them escape Cruella when he was two. He is a farmer's son, and, while still too young to read, enjoys picture books about science fiction. He and the General can communicate via a language of their own.

== Release and reception ==
The book was initially published in 1967 by William Heinemann, Ltd. While not as popular as its predecessor, it has since had many reprintings and has also been released as an Amazon Audible audiobook in 2011, as well as an audiobook-on-CD by Brilliance Audio in 2017. Author Elizabeth Hand praised the "sophisticated canine society" in the novel.

Although The Hundred and One Dalmatians has been adapted into two films (the animated One Hundred and One Dalmatians and live-action 101 Dalmatians), and each version has a sequel film (101 Dalmatians II: Patch's London Adventure and 102 Dalmatians), neither sequel film has any connection to The Starlight Barking.
