= Cruella (film) =

2021 film by Craig Gillespie

- Release poster
- Directed by: Craig Gillespie
- Screenplay by: Dana Fox; Tony McNamara
- Story by: Aline Brosh McKenna; Kelly Marcel; Steve Zissis
- Based on: The Hundred and One Dalmatians by Dodie Smith
- Produced by: Andrew Gunn; Marc Platt; Kristin Burr
- Starring: Emma Stone; Emma Thompson; Joel Fry; Paul Walter Hauser; Emily Beecham; Kirby Howell-Baptiste; Mark Strong
- Cinematography: Nicolas Karakatsanis
- Edited by: Tatiana S. Riegel
- Music by: Nicholas Britell
- Production companies: Walt Disney Pictures; Marc Platt Productions; Gunn Films
- Distributed by: Walt Disney Studios Motion Pictures
- Release dates: May 18, 2021 (Los Angeles); May 28, 2021 (United States)
- Running time: 134 minutes
- Country: United States
- Language: English
- Budget: $100 million
- Box office: $233.5 million (Note: Through its first month, the film made $58 million from domestic digital sales, though it is not factored into box office grosses.)

Cruella is a 2021 American crime comedy film directed by Craig Gillespie from a screenplay by Dana Fox and Tony McNamara, and a story by Aline Brosh McKenna, Kelly Marcel, and Steve Zissis. Produced by Walt Disney Pictures, Marc Platt Productions, and Gunn Films, it is based on Dodie Smith's 1956 novel The Hundred and One Dalmatians, serving as a backstory for its antagonist, Cruella de Vil. It is also the third live-action adaptation in the 101 Dalmatians franchise. The film stars Emma Stone as the title character, with Emma Thompson, Joel Fry, Paul Walter Hauser, Emily Beecham, Kirby Howell-Baptiste, and Mark Strong in supporting roles. Set in London during the punk rock movement of the 1970s, the film follows Estella Miller, an aspiring fashion designer, as she explores the path that leads her to become a notorious up-and-coming fashion designer known as Cruella de Vil.

In 2013, Disney announced the film's development with Andrew Gunn as a producer. Stone was cast in 2016 and also served as an executive producer on the film alongside Glenn Close, who portrayed Cruella in the previous live-action adaptations, 101 Dalmatians (1996) and 102 Dalmatians (2000). Principal photography took place in England between August and November 2019 with a $100 million budget.

Cruella premiered in Los Angeles on May 18, 2021, in the first major red-carpet event since the COVID-19 pandemic began. It was released in the United States theatrically by Walt Disney Studios Motion Pictures and simultaneously available on Disney+ with its Premier Access feature on May 28, grossing over $233 million worldwide and receiving positive reviews from critics. The film earned two nominations at the 94th Academy Awards, including Best Makeup and Hairstyling, winning Best Costume Design. It was also nominated in the former category and won in the latter at the 27th Critics' Choice Awards and 75th British Academy Film Awards, while Stone was nominated for Best Actress in a Motion Picture – Musical or Comedy at the 79th Golden Globe Awards. A sequel is in development, with Stone set to reprise her role.

== Plot ==
In 1964 England, Estella Miller is a creative child with a talent for fashion, but is ostracized for her black and white hair and rebellious behavior. After Estella is expelled from school, her mother Catherine decides to move them to London, stopping at a party at Hellman Hall, a mansion on the Suffolk coast, to ask the host for money. Sneaking inside, Estella loses her mother's necklace while being chased by the host's Dalmatian dogs, which push Catherine off a cliffside balcony to her death. Orphaned, Estella runs away to London and befriends street urchins Jasper and Horace.

In 1977, Jasper, Horace and Estella are making a living as thieves. Jasper gets Estella a job at the Liberty department store, but she is made a janitor and denied the chance to design clothes. She drunkenly redecorates the window display and impresses Baroness von Hellman, a renowned but authoritarian haute couture designer who offers her a coveted job at her fashion house. Estella notices the Baroness wearing Catherine's necklace, which she claims is a family heirloom once stolen by an employee. Estella asks Jasper and Horace to help retrieve it during the Baroness's Black and White Ball.

To conceal her identity, Estella creates an alter ego named "Cruella" based on her childhood nickname, letting her natural hair show rather than dying it, and wearing one of the Baroness's modified designs. Jasper releases rats into the party, allowing Estella to swipe the necklace. The Baroness summons her Dalmatians with a dog whistle, making Estella realize that the Baroness killed her mother. Seeking revenge, Estella orders Jasper and Horace to kidnap the Dalmatians after one of them swallows the necklace. Over the next few months, she upstages the Baroness at various events, gaining notoriety via her childhood friend, society columnist Anita Darling. The furious Baroness fires her lawyer, Roger Dearly, for failing to stop Cruella, while Estella's increasingly haughty behavior discomforts Jasper and Horace.

Estella designs a beaded dress, secretly disguising moth cocoons as beads, for the Baroness's spring collection. On the night of the show, the Baroness finds that the collection has been destroyed by the moths, and realizes Estella and Cruella are the same person. After staging her own rock music fashion show outside in Regent's Park, Estella is captured by the Baroness's men, along with Jasper and Horace who are framed by the Baroness for Cruella's murder. The Baroness sets their hideout on fire and leaves Estella inside to die. She is saved by John, the Baroness's valet, who has retrieved the necklace from the fire. He reveals that the necklace unlocks a box containing Estella's birth records, proving that the Baroness is her biological mother. Refusing to accept motherhood over her career, she ordered John to murder the baby, and told her husband, Baron von Hellman, that the baby did not survive the birth, causing him to die of a broken heart. John, who could not bring himself to commit murder, instead gave the baby to Catherine, one of the Baroness's maids, who raised Estella in secret.

Estella breaks Jasper and Horace out of prison and reveals the truth, reconciling with them. Planning to expose the Baroness once and for all, they sneak into her charity gala, having arranged for all the guests to dress in black and white, in honor of Cruella. On the balcony, Estella confronts her mother, who feigns an embrace before pushing her over the cliff, unwittingly witnessed by her guests. Estella secretly survives with a hidden parachute. Now legally dead, she adopts her Cruella persona for good, taking the surname "de Vil" after her Panther De Ville car. The Baroness is arrested by the Metropolitan Police. Before "dying", Estella willed her inheritance to Cruella, including the manor which she renames "Hell Hall", moving in with her accomplices.

Cruella sends Dalmatian puppies to both Anita and Roger respectively named Perdita and Pongo. Roger, now working as a musician, is smitten with Pongo, and begins to write a song about Cruella on his piano.

== Cast ==
- Emma Stone as Estella Miller / Cruella de Vil, an ambitious grifter and aspiring fashion designer, who goes on to become a notorious and dangerous criminal.
  - Maeve and Nell Chadwick as toddler Estella
  - Billie Gadsdon as 5-year-old Estella
  - Tipper Seifert-Cleveland as 12-year-old Estella
- Emma Thompson as Baroness von Hellman, the narcissistic, authoritarian, and egotistical head of a prestigious London fashion house and a renowned haute couture designer, who is Estella's new boss and eventual rival. She is the biological mother of Estella.
- Joel Fry as Jasper, a thief who grew up with Estella after her adoptive mother's death. To play Jasper, Fry did not look back at the character's depiction in the original animated film or the 1996 live-action remake, only copying his physical mannerisms.
  - Ziggy Gardner as young Jasper
- Paul Walter Hauser as Horace, a thief who grew up with Estella after her adoptive mother's death and Jasper's best friend. Hauser drew inspiration for the role from the performance of Bob Hoskins as Mr. Smee in Hook.
  - Joseph MacDonald as young Horace
- Emily Beecham as Catherine Miller, Estella's adoptive mother, an impoverished laundrywoman and former maid at Hellman Hall.
- Kirby Howell-Baptiste as Anita Darling, Estella's friend when Estella was a kid, who works as a gossip columnist. Anita is later gifted a female Dalmatian puppy named Perdita by Cruella.
  - Florisa Kamara as young Anita
- Mark Strong as John, the Baroness's valet and loyal confidante who aids her in her schemes.

John McCrea portrays Artie, a member of Cruella's entourage and owner of a vintage fashion shop. He was the first original character in a live-action Disney film to be openly gay and the character is inspired by David Bowie's Ziggy Stardust and Marc Bolan.

Additionally, Kayvan Novak portrays Roger Dearly, a lawyer working for the Baroness, who becomes a songwriter after he is fired, and is subsequently gifted a male Dalmatian puppy named Pongo by Cruella; Jamie Demetriou portrays Gerald, a clerk at Liberty who is Estella's initial boss; Andrew Leung portrays Jeffrey, the Baroness's assistant; Leo Bill portrays the headmaster at Estella's school; Paul Bazely portrays the police commissioner Weston; Ed Birch portrays the Baroness's head of security; Paul Chowdhry portrays a Kebab Shop Owner, while Abraham Popoola portrays his co-worker George; and Tom Turner appears as the Baron von Hellman, the Baroness's late husband and Cruella's biological father.

== Production ==
=== Development and casting ===
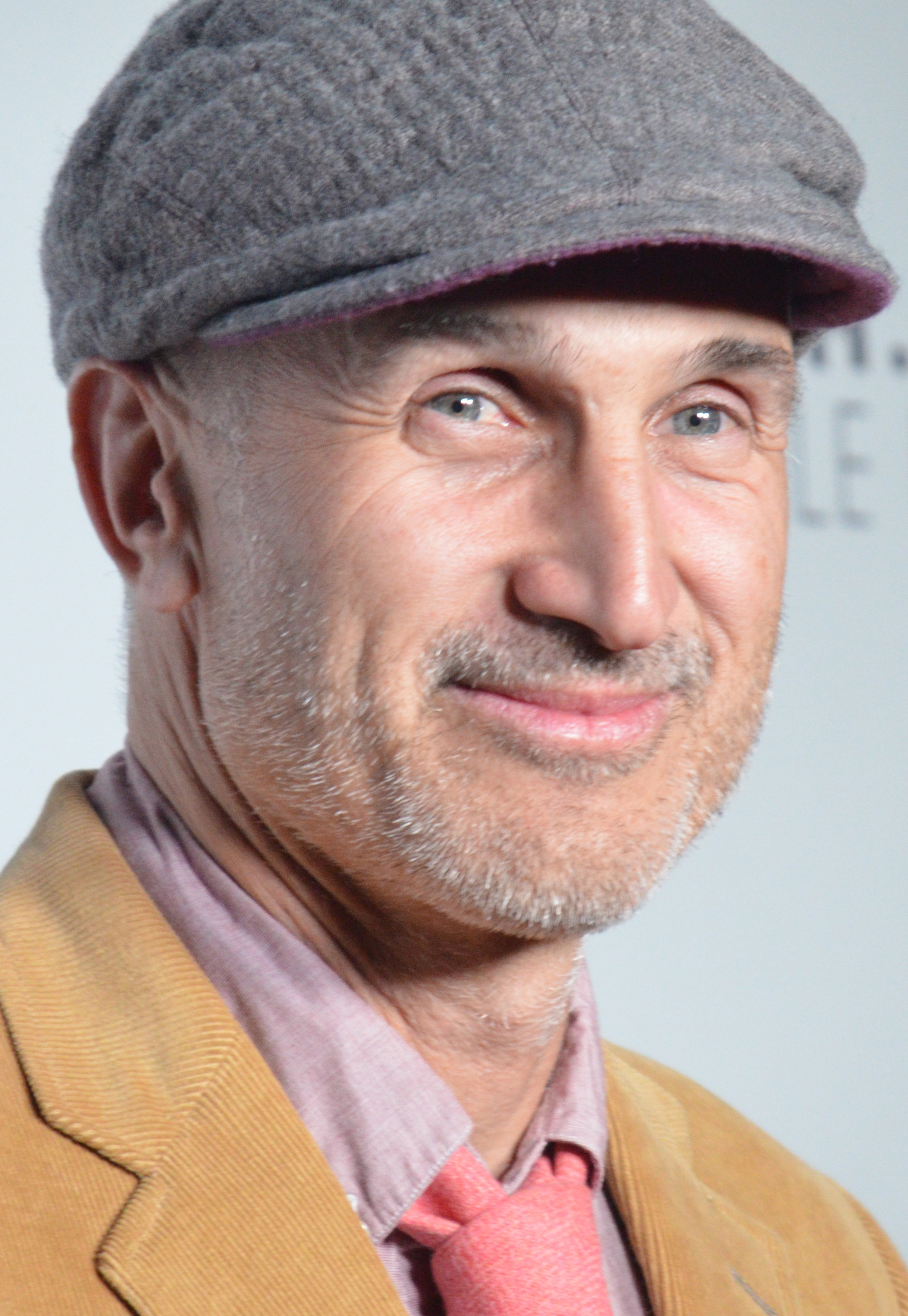
Craig Gillespie took over as director from Alex Timbers.

A live-action Cruella de Vil film, based upon the character in Disney's 101 Dalmatians franchise, was announced in 2013. Andrew Gunn was hired to produce the film, with Glenn Close (who previously played the character in the 1996 live-action adaptation 101 Dalmatians and its sequel 102 Dalmatians) serving as executive producer and Kelly Marcel revising the script originally written by Aline Brosh McKenna. In January 2016, Emma Stone was cast in the titular role of Cruella de Vil. Costume designer Jenny Beavan later stated that her role on the film was to help Stone appear as a younger 1970s portrayal of Close's 1990s role in 101 Dalmatians, possibly confirming the shared continuity between the films, though the characters of Roger and Anita appear as the same age as Cruella and portrayed as different races with different occupations in this film. However, Stone was not allowed to portray Cruella smoking as she had previously been since Disney had banned characters being shown smoking in its films since 2007.

In August 2016, Jez Butterworth was hired to rewrite the previous draft of the screenplay. In November 2016, it was reported that Disney had hired Alex Timbers to direct the live-action adaptation, with [[]] joining the film as a side producer. However, in December 2018, it was revealed that Timbers had left the film due to scheduling conflicts and Craig Gillespie would instead direct the film. In May 2019, Emma Thompson joined the cast as the Baroness, described as "an antagonist to Cruella who's thought to be pivotal in her transformation to the villain we know today". Nicole Kidman was considered to be the top choice, and Charlize Theron, Julianne Moore and Demi Moore were also in consideration for the role, while Dev Patel was considered for the role of Roger Dearly. The same month, Tony McNamara and Dana Fox were hired to write the recent version of the screenplay. Joel Fry and Paul Walter Hauser were added in the following months as Jasper and Horace.

=== Filming ===
In August 2019, during the D23 Expo, it was revealed that principal photography for Cruella had already begun. In September 2019, Mark Strong, Emily Beecham and Kirby Howell-Baptiste were added to the cast. Filming wrapped in November 2019.

=== Music and soundtrack ===
Nicholas Britell composed the film's score. The score album was released on May 21, 2021, by Walt Disney Records.

A separate soundtrack album for the film was released on the same day. Both albums feature "Call Me Cruella", an original song performed by Florence and the Machine, which appears in the end credits of the film.

== Release ==
=== Theatrical and streaming ===
Cruella was originally scheduled to be theatrically released on December 23, 2020, but it was delayed to May 28, 2021. The film received a PG-13 rating from the Motion Picture Association, "for some violence and thematic elements", making it the second live-action remake/spin-off of a Disney animated film to receive the rating, following Mulan. On March 23, 2021, it was announced that the film would be released simultaneously on Disney+ with Premier Access in response to the COVID-19 pandemic. The film premiered at the El Capitan Theatre in Los Angeles on May 18, 2021, the first major red carpet premiere since the pandemic began.

Tickets for the theatrical screenings went on sale on May 14, 2021, and it was announced that the film would also be screened in Dolby Cinema in select territories. It was first screened for critics the same day.

=== Marketing ===
A prequel novel titled Cruella: Hello, Cruel Heart was published by Disney Publishing Worldwide on April 6, 2021. Written by Maureen Johnson, the novel is set before the events of the movie, in 1967. It followed sixteen-year-old Estella and her encounter with Magda and Richard Moresby-Plum, two wealthy siblings who introduced her to the world of the rich and famous. A tie-in novelization of the film by Elizabeth Rudnick was published by Disney on April 13, 2021. A book titled Cruella's Sketchbook was also released on the same day. A manga adaptation of the movie by Hachi Ishie, titled Cruella: Black, White and Red was released by Viz Media on August 17, 2021.

On May 28, 2021, MAC Cosmetics launched a make-up collection inspired by the film.

On May 28, 2021, Disney+, in partnership with Social Tailors and Jeferson Araujo released an AR Effect for Cruella, where users could share stories on Instagram of themselves with makeup and visuals inspired by the film.

=== Home media ===
According to Samba TV, the film was watched on PVOD by about 686,000 American households in its debut weekend (39% behind Mulan's 1.12 million), resulting in around $20.57 million in revenue for Disney. The company also reported 83,000 UK households watched the film (resulting in $2.35 million), 15,000 in Germany, and 9,000 in Australia. In its first 30 days, the film was watched in an estimated 1.8 million U.S. households, generating a total of $54 million. In January 2022, tech firm Akamai reported that Cruella was the seventh most pirated film of 2021.

Cruella was released by Walt Disney Studios Home Entertainment on Digital on June 25, 2021, and Ultra HD Blu-ray, Blu-ray and DVD on September 21, 2021. In the United Kingdom and Australia, the film was released on home video on August 16 and 18, respectively.

On August 27, the film was made available for streaming to all customers on Disney+.

== Reception ==
=== Box office ===
Cruella grossed $86.1 million in the United States and Canada, and $147.4 million in other territories, for a worldwide total of $233.5 million.

In the United States and Canada, Cruella was released alongside A Quiet Place Part II, and was projected to gross $17–23 million from 3,892 theaters in its opening weekend, and around $30 million over the four-day Memorial Day frame. The film made $7.7 million in its first day, including $1.4 million from Thursday night previews. It went on to debut to $21.5 million and a total of $26.5 million over the four days, finishing second at the box office. 61% of the tracked audience was female, with 43% being under 25 years old. In its sophomore weekend the film grossed $11 million, finishing third behind The Conjuring: The Devil Made Me Do It and A Quiet Place Part II. The film then fell to 5th place in its third weekend, grossing $6.7 million. Deadline Hollywood wrote that despite having a running total of $71 million through five weeks, sources believed that the "Disney+ Premier PVOD tier is impacting the pic's overall revenue, not just at the box office, but in the movie's downstream ancillary revenues".

The film made $26.5 million in its domestic opening and earned $16.1 million in 29 other countries, for a global debut of $43 million. In China, Cruella debuted with a less-than-expected $1.7 million opening, finishing behind holdover F9 which earned $8.9 million.

=== Critical response ===
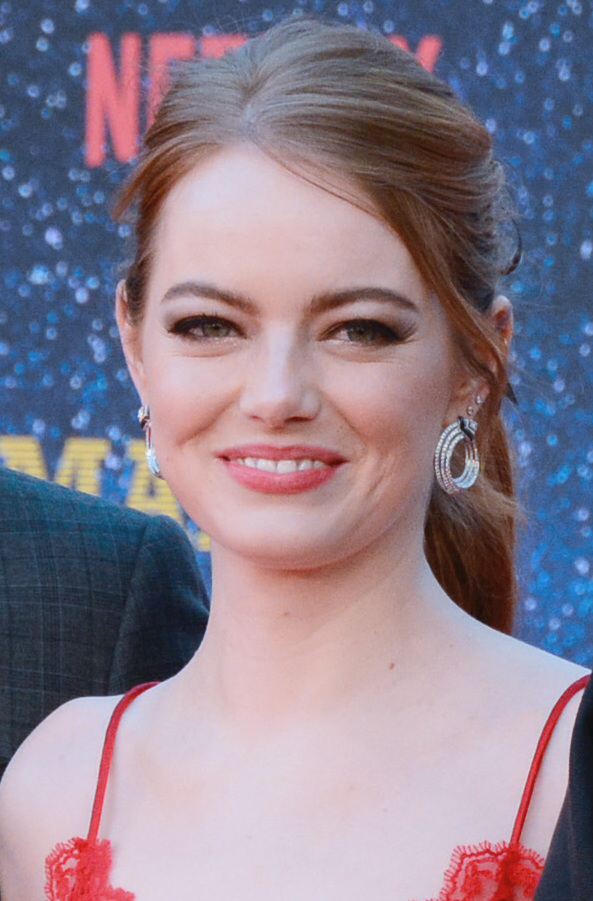
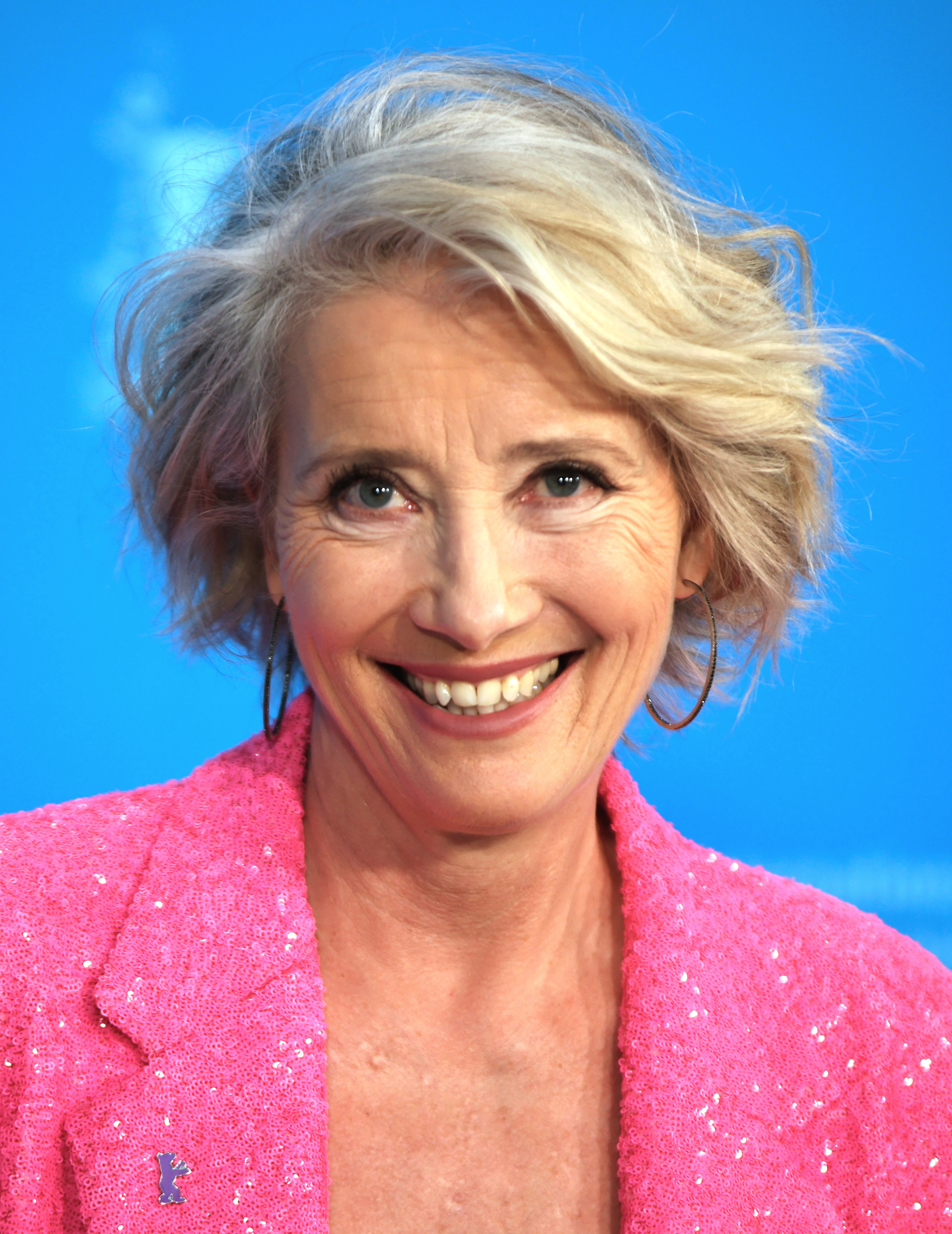
The performances of Emma Stone and Emma Thompson were praised by critics.

Cruella received mostly positive reviews. On the review aggregator Rotten Tomatoes, 75% of 415 critics have given the film a positive review, with an average rating of 6.8/10. The website's critics consensus reads: "Cruella can't quite answer the question of why its title character needed an origin story, but this dazzling visual feast is awfully fun to watch whenever its leading ladies lock horns." On Metacritic, the film has a weighted average score of 59 out of 100 based on 56 critic reviews, indicating "mixed or average" reviews. Audiences polled by CinemaScore gave the film an average grade of "A" on an A+ to F scale, while PostTrak reported 84% of audience members gave it a positive score, with 63% saying they would definitely recommend it.

Writing for Variety, Peter Debruge said:

The director, who brought a wicked edge to pop-culture redux I, Tonya a few years back, has rescued Cruella from the predictability of the earlier 101 Dalmatians remakes and created a stylish new franchise of its own in which a one-time villain has been reborn as the unlikeliest of role models.

A. O. Scott of The New York Times called the film "easy enough to watch but hard to care much about", complimenting the film's visual style while also finding that "[the film's] main purpose is to remind you that other movies exist". Peter Travers, reviewing the film for ABC News, wrote:

If looks really were everything, Cruella would be flying high on the dazzling costumes that two-time Oscar winner Jenny Beavan has designed for star Emma Stone to swan around in as this iconic villain of page and screen. But looks alone won't cut it when the plot points are so hit and miss.

Justin Chang of Los Angeles Times remarked the movie as "dazzling fun" and lauded the performances of Stone and Thompson, of which he described the rivalry of the performances as "hard to resist on-screen", and hailed Beavan's costume design on the film as one of her best works since Mad Max: Fury Road, while drawing parallels of the film's moral ambiguities and Stone's portrayal of the titular character to her previous performance as Abigail Hill in The Favourite.

Alonso Duralde of TheWrap wrote:

Placing these characters in the '60s and '70s allows director Craig Gillespie and screenwriters Dana Fox and Tony McNamara to place the characters into an exciting moment of fashion history ... Costumer Jenny Beavan, art director Martin Foley, and production designer Fiona Crombie, and their respective departments, all seem to be enjoying and making the most of the film's period demands.

In addition, Duralde also lauded the performances of Stone, Hauser, and Thompson, drawing comparisons of the characterizations of the latter's portrayal of the Baroness to Miranda Priestly in The Devil Wears Prada and Reynolds Woodcock in Phantom Thread. Peter Bradshaw of The Guardian awarded the film four out of five stars, describing it as "entertaining" and an "outrageous punk", as well as praising the performances and dynamic between Stone and Thompson. Furthermore, Bradshaw also complimented the tone of the film's soundtrack and similarly praised the film's mid-70s costume and production designs of Beavan and Crombie as "top-notch". Chicago Sun-Times's Richard Roeper rated the film with 3/4 stars, and highlighted Gillespie's direction for being "clever" and "devilishly offbeat" while praising the performances of Stone and Thompson as "appropriately over-the-top and wildly entertaining", drawing its comparisons to The Devil Wears Prada and also commended the costumes, makeup, and the production values of which he referred to as "spectacular", "dazzling" and a "visual feast", comparing its style to Phantom Thread and noting the similarities of the vibe and tone of the film's soundtrack to Goodfellas, Kingsman: The Secret Service, and Baby Driver.

The Daily Telegraph's Robbie Collin scored the film four out of five, similarly praised the film, which he described as a "rollicking tale" and an "acid-tipped wackiness", and lauded the film for its different approach in the Disney live-action adaptations as well as the previous 101 Dalmatians versions and its interpretation of the central character in a new context. He also similarly praised the performances (particularly Stone and Thompson) as well as the supporting cast, which he referred to as "zany", while specifically remarking of Stone's performance of Cruella De Vil as "sharp-angled, hyper-expressive" and that Thompson's portrayal of the Baroness "stalks the fine line between threatening and ludicrous with stiletto-heel precision". In addition, Collin also praised the film's visual style and Beavan's costume design as "eyeball-popping" and "a garden-hose-blast to the eyeballs of pure sartorial flair and exuberance". K. Austin Collins of Rolling Stone rated the film with three out of five stars, praising Stone's success in embodying the titular character, and describing her performance as "vampy, stylish, and cruel" while comparing the film's style of storytelling to I, Tonya, of which he noted a similar internalized victim-like story perspective of Tonya Harding to Cruella de Vil and even pointed out on the similar "plausibly two-sided" depiction of Stone's Cruella to Andrea "Andy" Sachs from The Devil Wears Prada, but with a twisted spin. He also commended the supporting performances, particularly Thompson and Hauser, referring the film as "a battle of wits and knits", "entertaining", and "fun". The Hollywood Outsider's Morgan Lanier described the film as "taking place in the 70's with a lot of camp to lighten the mood", praising Stone for giving Cruella "a twist of vulnerability" and giving the longstanding Disney villain a "fun glimmer". Lanier also praised Thompson's performance saying "Thompson gives the baroness the ability to chill a room". Lanier concluded that the movie was "joyous, campy, great costumes [...] amplified by a killer soundtrack". Kate Erbland of IndieWire gave the film a "B−", and labelling the film as "exciting" and "fun" and a "colorful, loud, and unexpected look" on the origin story of Cruella De Vil while Erbland singled out the praises on the casting and the performances of Stone, Thompson, Fry, Hauser, and the costumes, but found fault at the film's runtime of which she referred it as "bloated".

The Washington Post's Ann Hornaday described the film as "tedious, transgressive, chaotic and inert". While praising the performances of Stone, Thompson, Fry, and Hauser, as well as the costumes; she criticized the film, writing, and the runtime of which she found it as "overstuffed", "overlong", and "miserably misanthropic". Mick LaSalle of the San Francisco Chronicle thought the film was misbegotten and felt that it favors more on style over substance. Though he praised Thompson's performance, the costume design and the soundtrack, he chided the film's writing as "lazy" and "careless". Matt Zoller Seitz of RogerEbert.com gave the film 2/4 stars, and said: "There's no denying that Cruella is stylish and kinetic, with a nasty edge that's unusual for a recent Disney live-action feature. But it's also exhausting, disorganized, and frustratingly inert, considering how hard it works to assure you that it's thrilling and cheeky." Jacobin's Eileen Jones labelled the film as a "dopey, uninspired, and tedious mess", specifically criticizing the script as "basically rotten" and describing the transformation of Cruella's character as "the complete mangling of one of the greatest Disney villains of all time". Jones took issue with the absence of the "implied critique [...] of Cruella's wealthy entitlement and mad consumer obsession" as shown in 101 Dalmatians, and the attempt to make a "legendary dalmatian-skinning villain" into a "scrappy, likable hero". Jones complimented the film's costume design, specifically emphasizing the "trash gown" shown at the Baroness fashion show, and describing it as "sufficiently cool that costume designer Jenny Beavan may win another Oscar".

=== Accolades ===
Award	Date of ceremony	Category	Recipients	Result	Ref.
Academy Awards	March 27, 2022	Best Costume Design	Jenny Beavan	Won	
Academy Awards	March 27, 2022	Best Makeup and Hairstyling	Nadia Stacey, Naomi Donne, and Julia Vernon	Nominated	
Alliance of Women Film Journalists	January 31, 2022	Time Waster Remake or Sequel Award	Cruella	Nominated	
ACE Eddie Awards	March 5, 2022	Best Edited Feature Film – Comedy	Tatiana S. Riegel	Nominated	
American Cinematheque's Tribute to the Crafts	January 26, 2022	Feature Film - Costume Designer	Jenny Beavan	Won	
Art Directors Guild Awards	March 5, 2022	Excellence in Production Design for a Fantasy Film	Fiona Crombie	Nominated	
British Academy Film Awards	March 13, 2022	Best Costume Design	Jenny Beavan	Won	
British Academy Film Awards	March 13, 2022	Best Makeup and Hair	Nadia Stacey and Naomi Donne	Nominated	
Casting Society of America	March 23, 2022	Feature Big Budget – Comedy	Mary Vernieu, Lucy Bevan, Bret Howe, Emily Brockmann, and Olivia Grant	Nominated	
Chicago Film Critics Association	December 15, 2021	Best Costume Design	Jenny Beavan	Nominated	
Costume Designers Guild Awards	March 9, 2022	Excellence in Period Film	Jenny Beavan	Won	
Critics' Choice Movie Awards	March 13, 2022	Best Costume Design	Jenny Beavan	Won	
Critics' Choice Movie Awards	March 13, 2022	Best Makeup	Cruella	Nominated	
Dorian Awards	March 17, 2022	Campiest Flick	Cruella	Nominated	
Golden Globe Awards	January 9, 2022	Best Actress in a Motion Picture – Comedy or Musical	Emma Stone	Nominated	
Gold Derby Film Awards	February 27, 2022	Best Costume Design	Jenny Beavan	Won	
Gold Derby Film Awards	February 27, 2022	Best Makeup and Hair	Nadia Stacey, Naomi Donne, and Julia Vernon	Nominated	
Grammy Awards	April 3, 2022	Best Compilation Soundtrack for Visual Media	Craig Gillespie and Susan Jacobs	Nominated	
Hollywood Critics Association	January 8, 2022	Best Costume Design	Jenny Beavan	Won	
Hollywood Critics Association	January 8, 2022	Best Hair & Makeup	Carolyn Cousins and Nadia Stacey	Nominated	
Las Vegas Film Critics Society Awards	December 1, 2021	Best Costume Design	Jenny Beavan	Won	
London Film Critics' Circle	February 6, 2022	Technical Achievement Award	Jenny Beavan	Nominated	
Make-Up Artists and Hair Stylists Guild Awards	February 9, 2022	Best Period and/or Character Make-Up in a Feature-Length Motion Picture	Nadia Stacey, Naomi Donne, and Guy Common	Won	
Make-Up Artists and Hair Stylists Guild Awards	February 9, 2022	Best Period and/or Character Hair Styling in a Feature-Length Motion Picture	Nadia Stacey, Naomi Donne, and Julia Vernon	Nominated	
Nickelodeon Kids' Choice Awards	April 9, 2022	Favorite Movie Actress	Emma Stone	Nominated	
People's Choice Awards	December 7, 2021	The Drama Movie of 2021	Cruella	Won	
People's Choice Awards	December 7, 2021	The Drama Movie Star of 2021	Emma Stone	Nominated	
Online Film Critics Society Awards	January 24, 2022	Best Costume Design	Cruella	Nominated	
San Diego Film Critics Society	January 10, 2022	Best Costume Design	Jenny Beavan	Won	
San Diego Film Critics Society	January 10, 2022	Best Use of Music	Cruella	Nominated	
Saturn Awards	October 25, 2022	Best Fantasy Film	Cruella	Nominated	
Saturn Awards	October 25, 2022	Best Actress in a Film	Emma Stone	Nominated	
Saturn Awards	October 25, 2022	Best Film Music	Nicholas Britell	Nominated	
Saturn Awards	October 25, 2022	Best Film Production Design	Fiona Crombie	Nominated	
Saturn Awards	October 25, 2022	Best Film Costume Design	Jenny Beavan	Nominated	
Seattle Film Critics Society	January 17, 2022	Best Costume Design	Jenny Beavan	Nominated	
Set Decorators Society of America Awards	February 22, 2022	Best Achievement in Décor/Design of a Comedy or Musical Feature Film	Fiona Crombie and Alice Felton	Nominated	
St. Louis Film Critics Association	December 19, 2021	Best Costume Design	Jenny Beavan	Won	
St. Louis Film Critics Association	December 19, 2021	Best Soundtrack	Cruella	Won	

== Sequel ==
In May 2021, both Stone and Thompson stated that they would like to do a second Cruella film as both a sequel and prequel in the style of The Godfather Part II. In June 2021, Disney announced that a sequel was officially in the early stages of development, with Gillespie and McNamara expected to return as director and writer, respectively. In August 2021, Stone closed a deal to reprise her role in the sequel.
