= 101 Dalmatians (2022 musical) =

2022 stage musical

- The Musical
- Music: Douglas Hodge
- Lyrics: Douglas Hodge
- Book: Johnny McKnight; Zinnie Harris (stage adaptation)
- Basis: The Hundred and One Dalmatians by Dodie Smith
- Premiere: 12 July 2022: Regent's Park Open Air Theatre, London
- Productions: 2022 London; 2024 UK tour

101 Dalmatians is a musical with music and lyrics by Douglas Hodge and a book by Johnny McKnight from a stage adaptation by Zinnie Harris, based on the 1956 children's novel The Hundred and One Dalmatians by Dodie Smith. It is the second musical based on the book, following 2009's The 101 Dalmatians Musical. Like with the earlier musical, it has no direct relation to Disney's 101 Dalmatians franchise.

== Background ==
The musical was originally announced to premiere at the Open Air Theatre in Regent's Park (which is where the story is set) from 16 May to 21 June 2020, with an official opening night on 27 May. Kate Fleetwood was cast to play Cruella de Vil. The production was postponed due to the COVID-19 pandemic and was later rescheduled to run from 26 May to 20 June 2021 with previews beginning on 15 May. The 2021 run of the production was cancelled in January due to the continued COVID-19 restrictions.

== Production history ==
=== World premiere: London (2022) ===
The musical premiered at the Regent's Park Open Air Theatre, with previews beginning on 12 July 2022 and an official opening on 21 July. It ran until 28 August.

The production was directed by Timothy Sheader and choreographed by Liam Steel, with set design by Colin Richmond, costumes by Katrina Lindsay, and puppetry design and direction by Toby Olié. In March 2022, the full cast was revealed, including Kate Fleetwood as Cruella de Vil.

=== UK tour (2024) ===
A re-imagined production of the musical began a UK tour at the New Wimbledon Theatre on 22 June 2024, with Kym Marsh, Faye Tozer and Kerry Ellis alternating playing Cruella de Vil; the tour is directed by Bill Buckhurst.

=== London (2025) ===
Following the UK tour, the production played a limited run at the Eventim Apollo in Hammersmith, London from 18 July to 30 August 2025. Sydnie Christmas starred as Cruella de Ville alongside Jeff Brazier as Casper and Aston Merrygold as Jasper.

== Musical numbers ==
Act I

- "Go Wild/Now Then"
- "Wrong Tree"
- "It's My Treat"
- "Bury That Bone"
- "Bite It Back"
- "Turn Round Three Times"
- "Litterbugs"
- "Heads Or Tails"
- "The English Pub"
- "Two Bad Criminals"
- "Litterbugs (Reprise)"
- "Für Fur"

Act II

- "Achoo"
- "W.W.D.D"
- "Dogtra"
- "What The Bleep"
- "Delay Her"
- "I Can Smell Puppy"
- "All Of Our Kisses"
- "Turn Around Three Times (Reprise)"
- "Cruella's Demise"
- "Bury That Bone/Litterbugs (Reprise)"
- "One Hundred and One"
