= Letter from Paris =

Letter from Paris is a play by the British writer Dodie Smith which was first staged in 1952. After first being performed at the Theatre Royal in Brighton, it ran for 27 performances at the Aldwych Theatre in London. Inspired by Henry James's 1888 novel The Reverberator, it was not considered a success by critics. The cast included Peter Barkworth, Nicholas Phipps, Maxine Audley, Brenda Bruce and Michael Nightingale.

== Bibliography ==
- Wearing, J.P. The London Stage 1950-1959: A Calendar of Productions, Performers, and Personnel. Rowman & Littlefield, 2014.
