= Bonnet Over the Windmill =

1937 play

- Published by Hodder & Stoughton
- Written by: Dodie Smith
- Original language: English
- Genre: Comedy

Premiere
- Date premiered: 30 August 1937
- Place premiered: Grand Theatre, Leeds

Bonnet Over the Windmill is a 1937 play by the British writer Dodie Smith. Its original West End run at the New Theatre lasted for 101 performances between September and December 1937. The original cast included James Mason, Cecil Parker, Peter Coke and Anne Firth. The plot concerns three aspiring young actresses and their landlady, a middle-aged former music-hall performer, and the young women's attempts to attract the attention of a playwright and a theatre producer with hopes of obtaining dramatic roles.

== Bibliography ==
- Wearing, J. P. The London Stage 1930–1939: A Calendar of Productions, Performers, and Personnel. Rowman & Littlefield, 2014.
