= Cruella de Vil =

Character in One Hundred and One Dalmatians

- The Hundred and One Dalmatians & Disney's 101 Dalmatians character
- Cruella de Vil as she appears in Disney's One Hundred and One Dalmatians.
- First appearance: Books: The Hundred and One Dalmatians (1956); Films: One Hundred and One Dalmatians (1961)
- Created by: Dodie Smith
- Voiced by: Betty Lou Gerson (One Hundred and One Dalmatians); Susanne Blakeslee (1997–present); April Winchell (TV series); Tress MacNeille (TV series, two episodes, Welcome to the Club); Barbara Goodson (Disney on Ice); Michelle Gomez (101 Dalmatian Street); Patricia Hodge (BBC Audio Production)
- Portrayed by: Glenn Close (1996 and 2000 films); Rachel York (Musical adaptation); Victoria Smurfit (Once Upon a Time); Wendy Raquel Robinson (Descendants); Emma Stone (Cruella); Other: Sara Gettelfinger (Musical replacement); Milli Wilkinson (young; Once Upon a Time); Billie Gadsdon (5-year-old; Cruella); Tipper Seifert-Cleveland (12-year-old; Cruella); Kate Fleetwood (2022 musical)

In-universe information
- Full name: Cruella de Vil; Cruella Feinberg (Once Upon a Time); Estella von Hellman (birth name, Cruella); Estella Miller (adoptive name, Cruella)
- Nickname: Devil woman
- Title: Evil woman
- Occupation: Socialite, fashion magnate, designer
- Affiliation: Disney villains
- Family: Unnamed father (deceased); Malevola De Vil (mother; 101 Dalmatians: The Series); Baron and Baroness von Hellman (parents; Cruella); Catherine Miller (adoptive mother; Cruella)
- Spouses: Unnamed husband (in novel and in 1996 BBC Audio production); Mr. Feinberg (husband; Once Upon a Time); Lord Jack Shortbottom (husband; Evil Thing)
- Children: Carlos de Vil (son; Descendants)
- Relatives: Diego De Vil (nephew; Descendants); Hunter de Vil (great-nephew; 101 Dalmatian Street)
- Nationality: British

Cruella de Vil (Note: Spelt de Vil by Smith; spelt De Vil by Disney.) is a fictional character in the English author Dodie Smith's 1956 novel The Hundred and One Dalmatians. A pampered and glamorous London heiress and fashion designer, (Note: She is a fashion designer in the live-action film 101 Dalmatians (1996).) she appears in Walt Disney Productions' animated feature film One Hundred and One Dalmatians (1961), voiced by Betty Lou Gerson; in Disney's animated sequel 101 Dalmatians II: Patch's London Adventure (2003), voiced by Susanne Blakeslee; in Disney's live-action films 101 Dalmatians (1996) and 102 Dalmatians (2000), portrayed by Glenn Close; as well as Cruella (2021), portrayed by Emma Stone; and in many other Disney media.

In most of her incarnations, Cruella kidnaps the 15 puppies of the main Dalmatian characters, Pongo and Perdita, intending to turn them into fur coats along with 84 other Dalmatian puppies she legally bought before. The live-action Disney film reveals that Cruella chooses to skin puppies because when short-haired dogs grow older, their fur becomes coarse and does not sell as well as the fine, soft fur of puppies.

Cruella has become a pop cultural icon and a symbol of greed, vanity, evil, and cruelty to animals. Disney's Cruella ranked 39th on AFI's 100 Years...100 Heroes & Villains.

== Name ==
Cruella de Vil is a pun of the words cruel and devil, an allusion that is emphasised by having her English country house nicknamed 'Hell Hall'. The name 'de Vil' is also a literary allusion to Bram Stoker's Dracula (1897), in which the realty firm Mitchell, Sons & Candy write a letter to Lord Godalming informing him that the purchaser of a house in Piccadilly, London, is "a foreign nobleman, Count De Ville". Count De Ville, however, proves to be an alias for Count Dracula himself.

It is also believed that the name is inspired by the Rolls-Royce 25/30 "Sedanca de Ville" motorcar bought by Dodie Smith in 1939, in which she and her pet Dalmatian "Pongo" frequently travelled, which also formed the basis of the cartoon imagery of Cruella's own motorcar. In automotive coachbuilding, the term "de Ville" had originally indicated a vehicle with a separate compartment for the driver or chauffeur but by mid-twentieth century simply bespoke ostentatious luxury, as befits the overprivileged Cruella.

In some translations of the name, other wordplay is used to similar effect as the name in English. For instance:

- In Bulgarian, her name is Круела Де Вил (Kruela De Vil), but some properties use her translated name, Злобара Де Мон (Zlobara De Mon)—"злоба" meaning malice, spite, or malevolence.
- In Dutch, the name remains 'De Vil'. By coincidence, the Dutch verb for 'skinning' is villen, and vil is the conjugation of this verb for the first person singular.
- In Finnish, she is known as Julmia Juoninen, a name formed from the words julma (cruel) and juoni (plot, scheme).
- In French, she is referred as 'Cruella d'Enfer'—literally meaning 'Cruella of Hell' or 'from Hell'.
- In Hungarian, her name is Szörny Ella (Ella Monster) in the books and Szörnyella de Frász (Monsterella de Fright) in her Disney appearances.
- In Italian, she is called 'Crudelia De Mon'—a pun on crudele ('cruel') and demonio ('demon')
- In Polish (among other translations), the character is known as 'Cruella De Mon'—a play on the word 'demon'. She is also known as Torturella de Mon, a pun on the word 'tortura' (torture).
- In Brazilian Portuguese, Cruella is known as 'Cruela Cruel', which straightforwardly stems from 'cruel'.
- In both Spanish and European Portuguese, the name remains 'De Vil', but instead of representing "devil", it represents words for "from vileness" or "from villainy".
- In Russian, her name is Стервелла Де Виль (Stervella De Vil), from "стерва" (bitch, as a human character derogative term).
- In Serbian, her name is Круела Де Вил (Kruela De Vil), but some properties use her translated name, Злица од Опака (Zlica od Opaka)—"злица" meaning evil, and "од Опака" meaning wicked.
- In Ukrainian, her name is Лютелла Де Віль (Lyutella De Vil), a pun on the word "лють" (fury). She is also known as Лютелла Де Явол (Lyutella De Yavol), where Де Явол is very similar to the word "диявол" (devil).

== In Dodie Smith's novels ==
=== The Hundred and One Dalmatians ===
Twin sisters Janet and Anne Grahame Johnstone illustrated Smith's The Hundred and One Dalmatians.

Cruella is depicted as a pampered and glamorous London heiress in the original story. She was a former schoolmate of Mrs. Dearly (one of the owners of the original Dalmatians), but Mrs. Dearly says they were not friends because Cruella frightened her. As a child, Cruella had one black plait and one white plait and was eventually expelled for drinking ink. However, she appears to be on friendlier terms with Mrs. Dearly by the novel's beginning, before Cruella steals the Dearlys' Dalmatian puppies, having noted they would make "enchanting fur coats" and that no one had thought of making coats of dog skins before.

"Lovely lovely dogs. You’d go so well with my car, and my black-and-white hair."

— Cruella de Vil on Pongo and Missis.

The One Hundred and One Dalmatians describes Cruella as the last descendant of a prosperous and notorious family; she appears wealthy, but is in fact heavily in debt. She is married to a furrier, whose first name is never mentioned by anyone. Many characters remark that Cruella only married him for his occupation. When Mrs. Dearly asks Cruella what her married name is, Cruella retorts that, in contrast to the usual patriarchal custom, she has made her husband adopt her surname as his own; however, she and her husband have no children, meaning the line will still die out with her. Cruella is portrayed as the tyrannical figure in the marriage, and her husband is a meek, subservient man who seldom speaks and obeys his wife entirely, even though he is just as evil as she is. He keeps his entire fur collection in the house so Cruella can wear whichever she likes. Her favorite is a white mink cloak, which she usually wears with tight satin dresses and jewels. The dresses and jewels are always in contrasting colours—for instance, a black dress with ropes of pearls, or a red dress with ropes of emeralds. However, her jewels are later revealed to be mostly sham.

Cruella's chauffeur-driven car is a black-and-white striped Daimler Empress Mark III DF 308 limousine; Mr. Dearly describes it as "a moving zebra crossing". Cruella boasts that it has the loudest horn in London, which she insists on sounding for the Dearly couple. When Cruella has guests for dinner, all of her food is strangely coloured and tastes strongly of pepper. When Mr. Dearly comments she might find her mink cloak too warm for a mild autumn evening, Cruella laughs that she never finds anything too warm; she constantly stokes a roaring fire and complains of being cold despite the unbearable heat. The flat is portrayed as a luxurious version of Hell, with all the rooms made of marble and coloured garishly in green, red, or black. Her guests also meet her abused white Persian cat, whom Cruella freely admits she would have killed if it were not worth so much money.

Cruella happens to be in the house when the puppies are born, as Mrs. Dearly reluctantly invites the de Vils to a dinner party along with her other guests. The other guests leave politely when the puppies arrive, but Cruella barges into the broom cupboard to see the puppies. Revolted by the spotless skins of the newborns, she offers to have them drowned at once; this is her way of getting rid of animals she views as worthless, as she has drowned dozens of her cat's kittens. The Dearlys assures her the spots will come later, but refuse to sell the puppies. Upon a second visit to the house, Cruella picks up the mature puppies and treats them like clothing to be worn. A third visit occurs when the Dearlys are out, and Cruella, having bought up all the other Dalmatian puppies she could find in the area, keeps the Nannies talking while hired thieves steal the puppies for her. However, her plan backfires when the Dearlys start advertising for the missing puppies and the publicity makes selling Dalmatian coats too risky. Cruella demands the Baduns, caretakers of her old estate of Hell Hall, to kill the puppies at once, but the dogs escape after she leaves. Cruella pursues them, but her love of fire causes her to stop and applaud the spectacle of a bakery burning to the ground, buying the dogs more time.

When the Dalmatians return to London, they and the Persian cat enact vengeance on Cruella by destroying all of Mr de Vil's fur stock. Most of the furs were not yet paid off, and the de Vils fled England to get away from their debts, supposedly going in for plastic raincoats instead of fur. Cruella's black side of her hair goes white, and the white side goes an off-greenish shade, from the shock.

=== The Starlight Barking ===
In Smith's 1967 sequel, The Starlight Barking, Cruella and her husband return to England and start a business selling metallic plastics. Cruella, while still obsessed with heat and pepper, has lost her obsession with fur, replacing all her coats, sheets, cloaks, etc. with metallic plastic versions that are as impenetrable as armour. She has dyed her hair to its normal black and white state. When Sirius puts all the humans to sleep, the dogs and cats believe Cruella is responsible and decide to kill her once and for all, until they find she is asleep like everyone else and no longer a threat to them due to having lost interest in fur. It is noted that she is the only one of the sleepers who does not look peaceful (even her husband snores away happily) but instead is grim and unhappy even in sleep. She has repainted her house and removed the marble (artificial marble, according to the White Cat), so the walls now resemble angular psychedelic paintings, many of them portraits of herself.

== In Disney media ==
=== Animated adaptations ===
==== One Hundred and One Dalmatians (1961 film) ====
Disney's animated version of Cruella first appeared in 1961's One Hundred and One Dalmatians, in which she was voiced by Betty Lou Gerson and animated by Marc Davis, who together crafted her into an iconic and memorable character. Cruella is one of the few characters to be completely controlled by a single animator, and Davis claimed that Gerson's vocal performance was his greatest inspiration when it came to the character. Disney based its version of Cruella on the personality and mannerisms of Tallulah Bankhead, and her long, lanky physical design came from Mary Wickes, who served as her live-action model. The cool detachment of the original character was replaced by a crazed mania, in which Cruella only barely clung to a sheen of glamour. For unexplained reasons, Cruella's cat and husband were omitted from the Disney version. Cruella drives a very distinctive automobile, coloured red and black, which strongly resembles a Mercedes-Benz 500K Cabriolet.

In 2002 Forbes ranked Disney's Cruella as the thirteenth-wealthiest fictional character. She was also listed as the 39th-greatest villain in American cinema in AFI's 100 Years... 100 Heroes and Villains. Moreover, in Ultimate Disney's Top 30 Disney Villains Countdown, Cruella ranked #6.

In the film, Cruella is wealthy, rude, and spoilt. She mocks her childhood friend, Anita Radcliffe and Anita's husband Roger for earning their money from songwriting. Cruella desires to make a fur coat from the Radcliffes' Dalmatians, but does not tell the Radcliffes this, simply demanding to know when the puppies arrive. Upon the night of the puppies' birth, Cruella is at first dismayed to find their coats completely spotless but cheers up when Anita tells her that the spots will appear in a few weeks. Cruella makes an offer to buy the puppies, all the while mocking Roger for his songwriting career and splattering Roger and Pongo with ink from her pen. When Roger finally defends himself and his wife from her and tells her the puppies are not for sale, she furiously ends her friendship with Anita and storms out, vowing vengeance.

Weeks later, Cruella secretly hires two thieves named Jasper and Horace Badun to steal the puppies, which they do. Both Roger and the police immediately suspect her, but the latter fails to find anything connecting her to the theft. However, fearing the ongoing investigation, Cruella goes to her ancestral home in Suffolk, where the puppies are being kept, and angrily demands her henchmen to kill and skin the puppies for her that very night, exploding a bottle of alcohol in the fireplace to drive home her point. The next morning, Cruella learns that the puppies have escaped the house at night, being rescued by Pongo and Perdita. She and her henchmen set off in pursuit, and she berates Jasper and Horace for reckless driving, despite her worse driving skills.

The next day, on Christmas Eve, Cruella, Jasper, and Horace track the Dalmatians to Dinsford. While driving her car across town, she sees a long procession of black puppies walking past her into a moving van. Realising at the last second that the puppies are the Dalmatians in disguise, she furiously pursues the van in her car and tries to ram the van over a cliff. Jasper attempts the same thing, but Horace panics and causes their truck to swerve and crash into Cruella instead. Cruella throws a tantrum among the two vehicles' wreckage as the van drives away.

The film features a song written by Mel Leven, using her name as the title, sung by the Dalmatians' owner Roger (Bill Lee), who holds the woman in contempt.

==== 101 Dalmatians: The Series ====
Cruella is the main antagonist of the 101 Dalmatians animated series, voiced by April Winchell in the majority of the episodes, and Tress MacNeille in the episodes "Fungus Among Us" and "Close But No Cigar". This Cruella is based on Glenn Close's portrayal from the live-action film, but with Marc Davis's design from the animated film. She does not wear fur, usually does not smoke (although in the episodes "Smoke Detectors" and "Hail to the Chief" she did) and is totally sane, yet still temperamental and impatient. Her villainous plot in the show was to steal the Dearlys' farm from them, using the puppies as a ransom. Her mother, Malevola de Vil, demands her to do this, and Cruella also was denied the farm by old Widow Smedly the first time she tried to buy it, incensing her and beginning her obsession.

Cruella is an archetypal corporate villain who will seize on any scheme to make money, and Jasper and Horace are her oft-fired company employees, in this version. Cruella's schemes involve such things as drilling oil from the swamp near Dearly farm (thereby polluting it), buying Kanine Krunchies and replacing the nutritious ingredients with sawdust and chalk, or sending Jasper and Horace to drive out the owners of Mom and Pop's Grocery Store so she can buy it herself.

In the Christmas Special "A Christmas Cruella", it is revealed that, as a child, Cruella had wanted nothing more in life than a Dalmatian puppy. Her parents, however, never celebrated holidays or birthdays with her, and always left her in the care of foreign nannies while they went on holidays, sending her nothing but clothes as gifts. She had a single white streak in her hair as a child. She finally snapped and turned evil in her teens, when her parents led her to believe they would be home for Christmas with her dream puppy, and then sent cardboard cutouts of themselves and a puppy instead. Her hair also turned half-white at this time.

In the series finale, she uses an inflatable bodysuit to disguise herself as a shapely blonde surfer clad in a bikini. She plans to seduce Roger, to prompt Anita to divorce him so she (Cruella) can buy the farm. When Anita goes swimming, Cruella asks Roger to swim with her and then tries to kiss him. Her inflatable suit is popped by the puppies' chicken friend, turning Cruella into the shape of a surfboard.

==== 101 Dalmatians II: Patch's London Adventure ====
Cruella returns in 101 Dalmatians II: Patch's London Adventure, once again as the main antagonist, where she is now voiced by Susanne Blakeslee due to the death of Betty Lou Gerson.

The film picks up where the previous film left off, establishing that Cruella was arrested and exposed as the mastermind behind the theft of Pongo and Perdita's 15 puppies, but was not sent to prison for her crimes. She is prohibited from contacting the Radcliffes or their dogs and placed on probation which prohibits her from purchasing any more furs. After being wrecked in the first film, her fancy car is reduced to a shoddily fixed mess, which falls apart when she tries to drive it.

Cruella initially enlists the help of a painter named Lars to cure her of her obsession for fur coats. For a while, he paints beautiful spotted paintings for her, soothing her mania, but eventually starts to regress, demanding him to make paintings out of puppy skins and rehiring Jasper and Horace to steal the puppies again accordingly. When Lars, an animal-lover, refuses to harm the puppies, Cruella reverts to her original plan to kill the dogs for a coat, eventually going completely insane once the puppies escape again. After an extended chase, she winds up stranded in the River Thames, where she is arrested and imprisoned in an insane asylum. After this second debacle, Jasper and Horace renounce her completely and go legitimate, starting a shop together.

==== 101 Dalmatian Street ====
Cruella appears in the series 101 Dalmatian Street voiced by Michelle Gomez. Acting as an alternate continuation, the series takes place sixty years after the events of the original 1961 film. Cruella's great-nephew, Hunter de Vil, plans to capture the family of Doug and Delilah, descendants of Pongo and Perdita living in Camden Town, and bring them to his great-aunt, now living in Switzerland. However, Hunter is unaware she intends to kill the Dalmatian family to make a fur coat. When he finds out, he turns on Cruella and helps the Dalmatians defeat her and her henchmen. In this adaptation, Cruella is either in her late 80s or early 90s. She has lost her hair, but not her mobility or vanity, and hides her ageing with a special spray.

==== Other Disney animations ====
Susanne Blakeslee also voiced Cruella in the television series House of Mouse, which featured a running gag in which she inspects dogs from other Disney films with a measuring ruler. She also appeared in the direct-to-video film Mickey's House of Villains as one of the main villains who helps Jafar to take over the House of Mouse for Halloween night.

Cruella also appears in Disney's Christmas Favorites during the segment "Santa Cruella".

In The Simpsons short Plusaversary, Cruella appears as one of the attendees at the party in Moe's Tavern. In another The Simpsons short, Welcome to the Club, Cruella (voiced by Tress MacNeille) appears along with other Disney Villains trying to convince Lisa Simpson how fun it is to be a villain.

Cruella makes a cameo appearance via a silhouette in a Givenchy advertisement as part of a collaboration with the Walt Disney Company. She is seen pulling up to a Givenchy store, only to be scared away by Pongo and Perdita, who growl at her. The advertisement utilises traditional animation done by Eric Goldberg.

Cruella is part of the Walt Disney Animation Studios characters that appear in the 2023 short film Once Upon a Studio gathering to take a group photo.

=== Live-action adaptations ===
==== 101 Dalmatians (1996 film) ====
In Disney's 1996 live-action remake of the animated film, 101 Dalmatians, and its 2000 sequel, 102 Dalmatians, Cruella de Vil was played by Glenn Close.

Glenn Close portrays Cruella de Vil in the 1996 film 101 Dalmatians and its 2000 sequel, 102 Dalmatians. The film reinvents Cruella as the vindictive, snobbish and very glamorous magnate of an haute couture fashion house, "House of De Vil", which specialises in fur couture. The character of Anita (played by Joely Richardson) is a couturière and employee of De Vil. Unlike the animated film, the live-action version provides another reason why Cruella wants to make the puppies into coats at a young age: their fur would not be as soft and as fine when they fully grow up. At the start of the film, it is revealed that Cruella has secretly had her henchmen slaughter a white Siberian tiger at London Zoo for its pelt. The suspicions and accusations of the Dearly family force Cruella to step up her plans to make the puppies into a coat, the puppies escaping while her henchmen are preparing to do the work and Cruella being subsequently thrown into a vat of molasses and a pig pen when she tries to track them to a farm. At the end of the film, she and her henchmen are arrested and sent to prison, with the Dearlys able to buy a large house after Roger's latest video game (inspired by the puppies' ordeal) proves a success when he also makes Cruella the villain within the game's storyline.

Along with Close's performance, Cruella's costumes (by Anthony Powell and Rosemary Burrows) received appreciative attention, including a spread in Vanity Fair. Claws were applied to her gloves, while her necklaces were made from teeth, to add to the idea that Cruella enjoyed wearing parts of dead animals. Nails were also projected from the heels to make them especially vicious in appearance. Some of her clothes were made out of leather or PVC, and Cruella always wore much make-up. She is seen in the film always smoking to give the appearance of a mysterious "villain".

This film increased the physical comedy of the Disney animated film, even veering into more juvenile humor, such as Cruella falling into a vat of old molasses. Close's performance was well-received and her sex appeal as the character was also credited. Close has commented on how demanding the slapstick physicality of the role was while wearing nail-heeled boots and corsets. Close also insisted that she should fall into the molasses herself rather than delegate it to a stunt double. However, the live-action film was not as critically successful as the animated one.

==== 102 Dalmatians ====
In 102 Dalmatians, while under the effect of Dr. Ivan Pavlov's hypnotherapy treatment, Cruella is cured of her fur addiction and released from prison on parole, three years after the events of the first film. She insists on being called "Ella" because "Cruella sounds so... cruel". Reformed, she becomes completely devoted to saving animals. She is appalled by even the smallest sight of fur fashion, boarding up all her fur clothing and the drawing of herself in a Dalmatian puppy coat. She quits her characteristic habits, such as wearing fur clothing, long nails, extravagant hairstyles, and smoking.

This new persona, however, will not last for long since the effects of Big Ben's chimes manage to undo the conditioning, reverting Cruella to her former self. Her old habits return, with Cruella redesigning the sketch of the original Dalmatian coat to include a hood specifically so that she can use three new puppies to make the coat on top of the original ninety-nine puppies required; the chosen extra three being the children of Dipstick, one of the Dearlys' original fifteen puppies. Despite her efforts to distract attention from herself by framing the owner of the Second Chance Dog Shelter for her crimes (the only person who stands to benefit if she reverts to her old behaviour, as her parole states that her fortune will go to dog shelters in the Westminster area and Second Chance is the only such shelter), her plans are discovered by her parole officer, also Dipstick's owner.

Cruella's accomplice this time is a French furrier named Jean Pierre Le Pelt, who carries out the thefts and helps to design the coat. He is trapped in one of his own coats when it is sewn shut during a fight in a sweatshop in France, while the stolen puppies lure Cruella into a trap where she is literally baked into a massive cake. She is arrested, along with Le Pelt, both being sentenced to life in prison for their actions.

==== Once Upon a Time ====
Cruella De Vil
- Once Upon a Time character
- First appearance: "Heroes and Villains" (4.11)
- Last appearance: "Leaving Storybrooke" (7.22) (archive footage)
- Created by: Edward Kitsis & Adam Horowitz
- Portrayed by: Victoria Smurfit; Milli Wilkinson (child)

In-universe information
- Alias: Cruella Feinberg
- Title: Queen of Darkness
- Occupation: Mayor of Underbrooke; Ruler of the Underworld (briefly)
- Affiliation: Queens of Darkness (formerly)
- Family: Madeline (mother; deceased); Unnamed father (deceased); Two unnamed stepfathers (deceased)
- Significant others: Isaac Heller (briefly); Mr. Feinberg; Prince James (in the Underworld)

Centric episodes
- "Darkness on the Edge of Town"; "Sympathy for the De Vil"

Cruella appears in the fourth, fifth and seventh seasons of the TV series Once Upon a Time, where she is portrayed as an adult by Victoria Smurfit, and as a child by Milli Wilkinson, as a witch who possesses the power to control animals. A childhood sociopath, Cruella poisoned her father and two stepfathers. Her mother Madeline (Anna Galvin) kept her locked inside the house to prevent her from harming others. As an adult, she met Isaac (the Author) (Patrick Fischler), who was posing as a regular journalist; through him, she learned that her world, a perpetual 1920s England, was one of many. Smitten with her, the Author gave her the power to control animals. Cruella used the new power to have her mother's dalmatians kill her, and killed them and made their fur into a coat. In a struggle to prevent the Author from writing another note about her, the vial of magic ink spills on her, causing her blonde hair to turn black-and-white. However, the pen had a remnant of ink in it, which the Author used to write down a note that would, from there on, prevent Cruella from taking another life: "Cruella De Vil can no longer take away the life of another". Cruella kept this secret, as intimidation would still work for her needs.

She later ended up in the Enchanted Forest, where she became infamous for turning animals into outerwear. Rumplestiltskin (Robert Carlyle) recruited her, Ursula (Merrin Dungey) and Maleficent (Kristin Bauer van Straten) to acquire the Dark Curse, but he double-crossed them and left them to be killed by the Chernabog. Escaping together, Cruella joined the two in trying to get assistance from Snow White (Ginnifer Goodwin) and Prince Charming (Josh Dallas) in preventing the Evil Queen (Lana Parrilla) from casting the curse. The Tree of Wisdom they consulted refused to answer due to Snow's pregnancy. Along with Ursula, Cruella was asked by Maleficent to act as a guard while she went through childbirth as a dragon. As a result, Cruella was sucked into a portal with Ursula and the child to the Land Without Magic, due to a spell cast by the Apprentice. She and the Sea Witch steal the egg the baby was in and use the magic to prolong their youth in the magicless world. She later married Mr. Feinberg and lived in a mansion off Long Island in New York City.

In the present day, Cruella's marriage had fallen apart as the Federal Bureau of Investigation (FBI) was repossessing her husband's belongings. Mr. Gold and Ursula convinced her to join them in finding the Author to get happy endings. Cruella played little importance in the plot, until the Author was released from the book; unable to kill him herself, she pretended to threaten Henry Mills's (Jared S. Gilmore) life to force Emma Swan (Jennifer Morrison) and Regina to do so. However, Emma confronted her, not knowing the restriction the Author placed on Cruella, and magically blasted her off a cliff to her death.

After her death, Cruella ended up in the Underworld, a purgatory run by the deity Hades. While there, she met David's twin brother James; they quickly struck up a romantic relationship due to their similar personalities. When the heroes arrived with Gold to rescue the recently deceased Killian Jones (Colin O'Donoghue), Cruella was among the deceased of whom they came across. In hopes of returning to life, Cruella appealed to Henry, the new Author, to use the quill to bring her back to life. Later, she helped Regina to locate the grave of her lost love Daniel, who had since moved on to a better place. Mistaking David for James, Cruella made a move on him, then informed him of the hostility James held toward his brother. Cruella and James then hatched a plan to get out the Underworld by delivering Hades the child of Robin Hood and Zelena. James pretended to be David and put a magic-neutralising bracelet on Emma, while he and Cruella took the baby. They took Emma and Robin to the docks, planning to throw them into the River of Lost Souls, until David and Hook stopped them. David ended up throwing James into the River and Cruella ran off.

Once Hades's heart was restarted, and he planned to leave the Underworld with Zelena, Cruella teamed up with the Blind Witch; Hades offered to let them rule the Underworld in his absence and help trap the heroes there. Delighted with the idea of getting to torment souls for eternity, Cruella agreed to the deal.

Following the heroes' escape back to Storybrooke, Hook teamed up with the deceased King Arthur to locate the storybook so they could tell Emma how to defeat Hades. They went to find Cruella at the diner, where she reacted with disdain towards seeing Hook, but she coyly regarded Arthur with keen interest because of his good looks. When questioned about the haunting booth, Cruella admitted she destroyed it for good, since she didn't want anyone moving on if it meant she had to be stuck in the Underworld, too. Hook then pressed her about the book's whereabouts, which Cruella was surprisingly forthcoming about. She knew they would eventually figure out the truth even if she lied, and then told them that she put the book in the River of Souls. Cruella was later dethroned by Arthur who then ruled the Underworld for fifty years as she became a depressed and bitter woman who drank in the local bar with Sir Mordred.

In the seventh season, the Wish Realm version of Cruella is an accomplice to Rumplestiltskin.

==== Descendants ====
Cruella de Vil appears in the 2015 Disney Channel Original Movie Descendants. She is portrayed by Wendy Raquel Robinson. Along with other villains, Cruella has been exiled to the Isle of the Lost, where she has lived for at least twenty years. She has a 14-year-old son, Carlos, whom she abuses and treats like a servant, making him sleep near the bear traps she uses to guard her fur coats.

==== Cruella ====
In Disney's 2021 live-action adaptation, Cruella, Cruella de Vil was played by Emma Stone.

Cruella, a live-action film that explores De Vil's backstory by Disney, was announced in 2011. The screenwriter Aline Brosh McKenna, known for writing The Devil Wears Prada, was hired to write the screenplay, with Glenn Close serving as the executive producer, Andrew Gunn and Marc Platt as the producers, and Alex Timbers as director, while Kelly Marcel was set to revise the script originally written by McKenna. Emma Stone was cast in the titular role of Estella "Cruella" de Vil in 2016. Timbers dropped to direct the live-action Cruella de Vil film due to scheduling conflicts in December 2018 and was replaced with Craig Gillespie. The following year, Emma Thompson joined the film as Baroness von Hellman, while Tony McNamara and Dana Fox were hired to write the recent version of the screenplay. Joel Fry, Paul Walter Hauser, Mark Strong, Emily Beecham and Kirby Howell-Baptiste joined the cast. The film was simultaneously released to theatres and on premium video on demand through Disney+ on May 28, 2021. Due to changes in Disney policy towards smoking in their films, Stone was not allowed to smoke as Cruella.

In the film, Cruella grew up as Estella Miller, the daughter of Catherine, who is expelled from her first school due to her temper, provoking several fights. When Catherine visits a mansion for financial support, she is killed by Dalmatians after Estella believes she accidentally provokes them into chasing her, causing Estella to run to London by hiding in a bin lorry, where she is aided by Horace and Jasper, dyeing her distinctive black-and-white hair to better hide. As an adult, she gets a job in a prominent fashion boutique that brings her to the attention of the famed designer Baroness von Hellman, but Estella soon realises that the Baroness was the woman her mother had visited before her death. Planning to retrieve a necklace of her mother's that the Baroness has claimed as her own, Estella creates the identity of "Cruella" to create a distraction during the party, which begins a long campaign against the Baroness. During her efforts, Estella learns that the Baroness is, in fact, her biological mother; she intended to have her baby killed after birth, but her valet John gave the baby to Catherine, who was a maid in the house at the time. With this knowledge, Estella provokes a confrontation with the Baroness and then fakes her own death in a manner that gives the impression that the Baroness killed her; she is then arrested as a result, and Estella inherits her entire fortune as Cruella. In a post-credit scene Anita and Roger each receive a Dalmatian puppy, Pongo and Perdita respectively, born of the Dalmatians owned by the Baroness.

=== Disney Parks and live productions ===
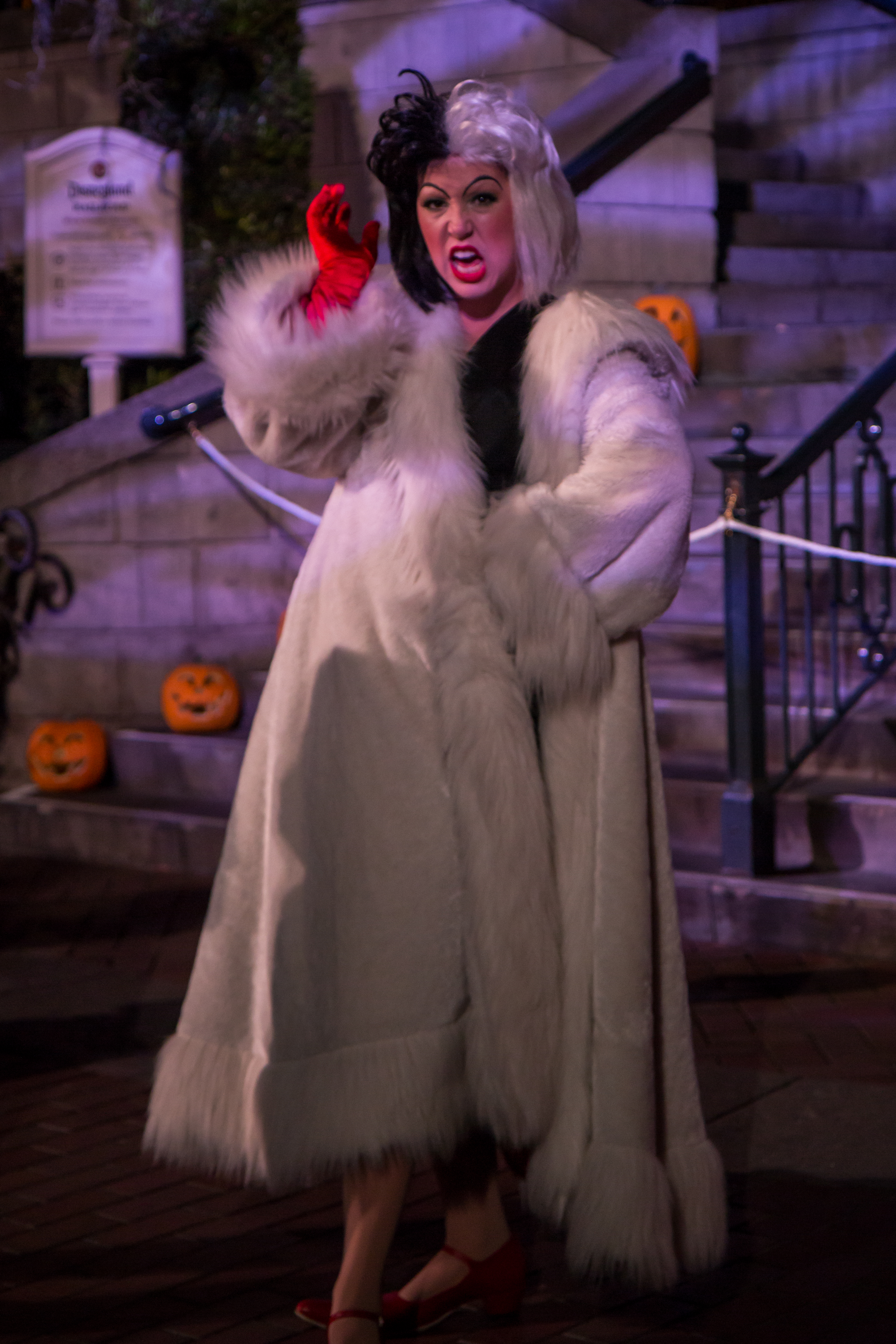
Cruella de Vil at Disneyland in 2015.

Cruella is the only meetable character from the 101 Dalmatians franchise at the Disney Parks and Resorts, and is usually located on Main Street, USA.

Cruella is also one of the Disney Villains Mickey fights in Disney's Hollywood Studios version of Fantasmic! Nighttime Show Spectacular in Walt Disney World. In Disney On Ice "Celebrations", Cruella was one of the Villains who appears during the Halloween Party.

Cruella is also a part of the Disney's Hollywood Studios live show Disney Villains: Unfairly Ever Afterin a major role as one of the three villains of the show.

=== Video games ===
Cruella appears as the main antagonist in the 101 Dalmatians franchise video games 101 Dalmatians: Escape from DeVil Manor (1997) and 102 Dalmatians: Puppies to the Rescue (2000).

Cruella is a playable character to unlock for a limited time in Disney Magic Kingdoms.

An alternate version of 1961 film's Cruella appears as a playable character in the video game Disney Mirrorverse.

In October 2024, Disney's Cruella was added as a playable character in Fortnite.

Cruella is set to appear in the DLC "Wishblossom Ranch" for Disney Dreamlight Valley, as one of the villagers of the titular valley.

=== Books ===
==== Kingdom Keepers series ====
Cruella first appears in Power Play, the fourth book of the young-adult book series by Ridley Pearson, Kingdom Keepers, as a member of the Overtakers, a group of Disney Villains. She is valuable to them since she knows the ways of the modern world. Cruella works with the Evil Queen to free Maleficent and Chernabog, while making sure the Keepers stay off their trail. Using DHI technology, she and the Queen head for the power facility and shut down the electricity, allowing Maleficent and Chernabog to escape their cells.

In the following book, Shell Game, she assists the Queen and Maleficent in stealing Walt's original notes on Chernabog from the Archives. She then boards the Dream for the two-week cruise, along with the rest of the Overtakers. She commands the Lion King hyenas, Happy and Howley, having them patrol the ship to keep the Keepers from finding Chernabog.

In the seventh book, The Insider, Cruella joins Tia Dalma, the Queen and Judge Doom's group in Toontown; she calls an army of animals to the area with a simple command, only to be knocked out by Amanda's telekinesis. Finn later discovers Cruella had been living in a luxurious decommissioned train compartment and tries strangling her to death. She flees in terror, but has a wrench tossed at her. She is last seen slumped on the ground, bleeding.

==== Evil Thing: A Tale of that De Vil Woman ====
In the seventh book of the Villains series by Serena Valentino, Cruella De Vil tells her story in the first person starting with her childhood. She describes herself growing up, with her father dying at an early age after gifting her daughter a pair of jade earrings that were said to have been cursed by the Odd Sisters, figures in the fairy tale books Cruella loved to read as a child. Her mother is a self-absorbed socialite, hardly ever seeing her daughter and giving her gifts, which Cruella equates to her mother loving her. The only two people that truly care about her are her governess, Miss Pricket, and her friend Anita who comes from a lower-class family.

When they attend school together, Cruella defends Anita from the bullies, and after school intends for Anita and her to travel around the world together. When Cruella puts on her jade earrings, she experiences a surge of power and becomes bossy and mean. She wears them when confronting the school headmistress at Anita's treatment. During the holidays following their first year at school, Cruella decides to have the staff's holiday dinner celebration downstairs, but her mother arrives in horror, and forbids Cruella from going back to school and is determined to find her a husband, as well as banning her from seeing Anita.

On Cruella's next birthday, her father's lawyer delivers a female Dalmatian puppy named Perdita, which apparently had been set up by her father prior to his death. After her birthday celebration, she is confronted by her mother about having a puppy, and her mother jokes to Cruella about having the puppy turned into a muff. A horrified Cruella is calmed when Anita arrives from school. At a dinner, Anita reveals she is going to typing school, which leaves Cruella feeling alone. Later, the two fight while Cruella is wearing the earrings, and Perdita urinates on Cruella's fur coat, which leads to her throwing Anita and Perdita out of the house.

Cruella eventually marries a man named Jack and confident in their future together, signs over her fortune to her mother. At 25 Jack dies in a fire, supposedly of suicide after seeing the massive amount of debt he had. With just the clothes on her back, Cruella goes to an old mansion called Hell Hall which her father had set aside from her in the case of an emergency. She then goes to meet with Anita, whom she has kept in touch with supposedly for updates on Perdita, and finds herself furious with Anita. She then vows to herself to get back at her, and decides to do so by taking Perdita's coming litter of puppies and turning them into a coat for her mother.

When Cruella reveals the plan to her mother, her mother is horrified and demands she return to Hell Hall. Cruella goes ahead with her plan and rounds up not only Perdita's litter, but all the Dalmatian puppies from miles around. Before she can kill them though, the puppies escape. Cruella then descends further into madness, rambling about another grand scheme to get those puppies. The novel ends with a note from Serena Valentino, saying she visited Hell Hall to take down Cruella's story and that she still wears the jade earrings to this day.

==== Be Careful What You Wish Fur ====
In the fourth volume of the Disney Chills series by Vera Strange, Delia is a girl at a private school who yearns to be the highest influence in fashion at her private school. The House of De Vil is a popular fashion house that all the girls strive to wear. One day, Delia finds a fur coat in an alley and talks herself into taking it. Delia is soon tormented by the unseen phantom of Cruella De Vil, who claims it is her coat.

== Audio adaptation ==
In 1996 the BBC adapted Dodie Smith's novel into a full-cast musical audio dramatisation starring Patricia Hodge as Cruella. This version is for the most part faithful to the source material, with some changes. Cruella's husband argues with her more than in the novel, and Cruella's love of heat is attributed to her simply being cold all the time, whereas in the book it is just a characteristic which implies she may not be fully human. Cruella and her husband do not leave England at the end of the story, and their fate is left unknown. The Dearlys never figure out that Cruella is behind the theft of the dogs. This version is to date the only adapted version which includes Cruella's husband, her love of heat and pepper, her cat, her zebra-striped car, and the fact her hair changes colour at the end of the story.

In this version, Cruella and the Baduns are given their own song, "It's Their Furs., which they sing together when Cruella orders the brothers to kill the pups.Amazon Audible later released this production as an audiobook, available for streaming online or through the app.

== Stage musical ==
Cruella appears in The 101 Dalmatians Musical, the stage musical adaptation of the novel. She was portrayed by Rachel York; however, she announced on her blog that she had stepped down from the role to pursue other projects. The role was taken over by Sara Gettelfinger. In the 2022 musical adaptation of the novel, Cruella was portrayed by Kate Fleetwood.

== In popular culture ==
- In the Hey Arnold! episode "Curly's Girl", when Rhonda breaks up with Curly after pretending to be his girlfriend, Helga calls her "Cruella".
- In the 1994 film Trading Mom, Jeremy Martin (played by Aaron Michael Metchik) strongly disapproves of his older sister's choice for their new mother, a wealthy and fussy French woman, during their first visit to the Mommy Market stating she looks like Cruella de Vil due to her evident liking of cigarettes and her extravagant appearance.
- In the 1998 remake of The Parent Trap, Annie James (played by Lindsay Lohan) tells her mother that her father is marrying a woman as evil as Cruella de Vil. This could also be considered an inside joke as Cruella de Vil is also the head of a prestigious London fashion house, just like Elizabeth James (played by Natasha Richardson). Furthermore, and coincidentally, the actress' sister Joely Richardson played Anita Campbell-Green-Dearly, Cruella de Vil's most trusted employee, in the 1996 remake of 101 Dalmatians. Meredith Blake (Elaine Hendrix) is occasionally referred to as "Cruella" by the twins as a tease, much to her annoyance.
- An inflatable representation of the character appeared at the 2012 Summer Olympics opening ceremony in London alongside other villains, Lord Voldemort, The Queen of Hearts, Captain Hook and Child Catcher, to haunt children's dreams – before the arrival of a group of over thirty Mary Poppins who descended with their umbrellas to defeat them – in a segment celebrating British children's literature.
- In Lois & Clark: The New Adventures of Superman, a tabloid once published a story accusing Lois Lane of cheating on her husband Clark Kent with Superman. Lois commented she was under Cruella on the popularity scale.
- In the first six seasons of the History Channel series American Restoration, Tyler Dale wears his hair dyed half-blonde, emulating Cruella's hairstyle.

=== In music ===
- The Queen song "Let Me Entertain You" features the lyrics "I'll Cruella de Vil You!"
- "The Cruel One" by Children 18:3 is a song about 101 Dalmatians, mentioning Cruella de Vil by name in the chorus.
- The Deadsy song "Cruella" is written about Cruella de Vil.
- Rock band The Replacements recorded a cover of the song "Cruella de Vil" for a compilation of Disney covers. It also appears on their 1997 compilation album, All for Nothing / Nothing for All.
- Spanish singer Alaska made a cover of song "Cruella de Vil" for the Spanish version of the 101 Dalmatians live-action film.
- Separate volumes of Disney's Greatest Hits include covers of "Cruella de Vil" from the 1961 film, including one by teen singer and actress Selena Gomez, as well as a two covers (one big-band cover) by blues pianist and vocalist Dr. John.
- Mark Campbell (lead vocalist of Jack Mack and the Heart Attack) sings the funky "Cruella De Vil" in 102 Dalmatians, and on the 2000 Disney Soundtrack Album.
- The barbershop quartet Vocal Spectrum performed a cover of the song "Cruella de Vil".
- American singer and performer Lady Gaga dressed up as Cruella de Vil for Halloween in 2010. The performer has had many outfits inspired by the villain.
- American singer Melanie Martinez dyed half of her hair blonde, in the same vein as Cruella.
- Late American rapper XXXTentacion, inspired by Cruella, dyed half of his hair blonde.
- In the animated film The Swan Princess: The Mystery of the Enchanted Kingdom, Cruella was briefly mentioned by Zelda, the villainess of the film, during her song "Bad Days Ahead".
- "Crudelia" by Marracash is a song about a cruel woman, mentioning Cruella de Vil (Crudelia De Mon in Italian) by name.
- In 2021, Chinese idol and member of NCT Dream's Renjun dyed half of his hair platinum blonde and black, in the same vein as Cruella.
- In 2023, Chinese idol and member of Seventeen's Jun dyed a layer of his hair black over his platinum blonde dye in the same vein as Cruella.
- "Tomboy" by South Korean girl group (G)I-dle is a song inspired by Cruella.
- In 2024, (G)I-dle member Yuqi had Cruella inspired-hair and wardrobe for the group's music video for "Super Lady."
- American rapper Cupcakke named her closing song from her album "Dauntless Manifesto" after Cruella.

=== Parodies ===
- In The Simpsons episode "Two Dozen and One Greyhounds", Mr. Burns plays the role of Cruella De Vil, stealing Santa's Little Helper's puppies to make them into a tuxedo. However, unlike Cruella, who has no hesitation in killing the puppies, Burns cannot bear to kill the puppies himself, because they are too cute. Declaring that he will never kill any animal that can perform good tricks again, Burns pays the Simpsons for the puppies, and he trains them to be world-class racing dogs.
- In the Dexter's Laboratory episode "Peltra", the title character is a parody of Cruella de Vil.
- Coco LaBouche, the antagonist of the 2000 Rugrats film Rugrats in Paris, shares many characteristics with Cruella.
- Cruella de Vil appeared in the MAD episode "2012 Dalmatians", a mash-up of 2012 and One Hundred and One Dalmatians.
- In the Jessie episode "101 Lizards", Mrs. Chesterfield plays a role similar to Cruella de Vil, where the protagonists suspect that she took Mrs. Kipling's baby lizards to make a suit out of them.
- Cruella de Vil appeared in a Robot Chicken skit called "101 Dalmatian Reproduction" in the episode "Yogurt in a Bag". In this short, Roger and Anita apologise to her after realising Dalmatians breed more than rabbits (even siblings) and willingly give the adopted 85 puppies back to Cruella. Cruella notes everyone is the hero of their own story, earning some ire from Roger and Anita.
- A parody of Cruella appears in the musical Twisted, a parody of Disney's Aladdin told from Jafar's point of view. In the title song, various Disney villains including Ursula, Scar, Gaston, Maleficent and Captain Hook, appear to Jafar and bemoan that they were unfairly portrayed and had good reasons for their actions. Cruella, conversely, states that all she wanted was to make a coat out of puppies, to which the other villains react in disgust.
- In the mobile game Disney Twisted-Wonderland, the alchemy teacher at Night Raven College, Divus Crewel, is inspired by Cruella.
