= Looking Forward (1933 film) =

1933 film by Clarence Brown

- Directed by: Clarence Brown
- Written by: Bess Meredyth; H.M. Harwood
- Based on: Service; 1932 play by Dodie Smith
- Produced by: Clarence Brown; Harry Rapf
- Starring: Lionel Barrymore; Lewis Stone; Benita Hume; Elizabeth Allan
- Cinematography: Oliver T. Marsh
- Edited by: Hugh Wynn
- Music by: William Axt
- Production companies: Metro-Goldwyn-Mayer; Cosmopolitan Productions
- Distributed by: Loew's Inc.
- Release date: April 28, 1933
- Running time: 82 minutes
- Country: United States
- Language: English

Looking Forward is a 1933 American Pre-Code drama film directed by Clarence Brown starring Lionel Barrymore, Lewis Stone and Benita Hume. It was produced and distributed by Metro-Goldwyn-Mayer. The sets and costumes were designed by studio regulars Cedric Gibbons and Adrian. Based on the 1932 Dodie Smith play Service, it depicts the desperate struggle of a London department store owner to save his business during the Great Depression. The film's title was taken from a book by the newly inaugurated president Franklin Delano Roosevelt, who is quoted in the film's prologue. The film was strongly backed by William Randolph Hearst's Cosmopolitan Pictures and Hearst was involved in the securing of the president's support for the film's new title.

== Plot ==
With his upscale department store steadily losing money, Gabriel Service Sr. (Lewis Stone) is forced to discharge some of his employees, including an unenterprising but loyal and long-serving Tim Benton (Lionel Barrymore). Then Service returns home to his mansion to inform his family of their own financial straits; he has kept the 200-year-old family firm afloat with his own money in recent times. Neither his young adult children, Caroline (Elizabeth Allan) and Michael (Phillips Holmes), nor their stepmother Isobel (Benita Hume) take him very seriously at first, despite his repeated warnings over the past few months. Isobel has also been seeing another man behind her oblivious husband's back.

The situation becomes so dire that Philip Bendicott (Lawrence Grant), one of Service's business partners, strongly urges him to sell out to Stoner, whose store chain is one of the few thriving businesses, serving a lower class clientele. Service loathes the idea, but decides he has no choice. Gossip soon spreads, especially when Stoner himself comes to inspect the department store.

When he breaks the news to his family, they are all appalled. The next day, when he returns home, Caroline informs him that Isobel has run off with her lover. Caroline and Michael urge their father to keep the firm and fight on. Though gratified by their spirit and unexpected concern for the store, Service rejects their proposal. Meanwhile, Benton has started a very successful business in his own home, with his wife Lil (Doris Lloyd) baking delectable pastries and cakes and their offspring, Willie (Douglas Walton (actor)) and Elsie (Viva Tattersall), pitching in. Michael flies back from Paris and Berlin, where his family thought he was taking a vacation, instead he shows them his designs of striking furniture, which he believes could be manufactured and sold by the department store, further Caroline wants to work as well in the department store. But Service Sr. doesn't want to take the risk and is decided to sell. Afterwards, on the way to the solicitors to sign away his store, he runs into Benton. Benton tells him about his "Benton pastries enterprise" and make him taste one. Mr. Service is very delighted by the pastry and Benton tries to get him to change his mind. When Service reads in the newspaper that the deal is already done, he is so outraged at Stoner's impudence that he does cancel the sale, due to Benton's example and encouragement. The last scene with Service Sr., Service Jr., Caroline, Jeoffrey Fielding (Colin Clive), Service's assistant and Caroline's admirer, and Benton is an optimistic scene, where the young take over helping the older to feel, that things go on. Michael Service tastes a pastry from Benton and orders 4 dozens/day for the store, Caroline wants to live on her earnings and be "very poor" to be on the level of Jeoffrey and finally the rain stops and a rainbow comes out. Together, the Services look forward to the future with optimism.

== Cast ==
- Lionel Barrymore as Tim Benton
- Lewis Stone as Gabriel Service Sr.
- Benita Hume as Mrs. Isobel Service
- Elizabeth Allan as Caroline Service
- Phillips Holmes as Michael Service
- Colin Clive as Geoffrey Fielding
- Alec B. Francis as Mr. Birkenshaw
- Doris Lloyd as Mrs. Lil Benton
- Halliwell Hobbes as James Felton, one of Gabriel Service Sr.'s business partners
- Douglas Walton as Willie Benton
- Viva Tattersall as Elsie Benton
- Lawrence Grant as Philip Bendicott
- George K. Arthur as Mr. Tressitt
- Billy Bevan as Mr. Barker
- Eily Malyon as Mrs. Munsey
- Edgar Norton as Mr. Elliott
- Ethel Griffies as Miss Judd
- Alan Edwards as Gray Mortimer
- Rita Carlyle as Mrs. Kentish

== Bibliography ==
- Pizzitola, Louis. Hearst Over Hollywood: Power, Passion, and Propaganda in the Movies. Columbia University Press, 2002.
- Young, Gwenda. Clarence Brown: Hollywood's Forgotten Master. University Press of Kentucky, 2018.
