= Service (play) =

1932 play by the British writer Dodie Smith

Service is a 1932 play by the British writer Dodie Smith. It is set around the lives of the Service family who own a department store and whose fortunes are hit by the Great Depression.

== Adaptation ==
In 1933 it was adapted into an American film Looking Forward directed by Clarence Brown and starring Lionel Barrymore and Lewis Stone.

== Bibliography ==
- Gale, Maggie. West End women: women and the London stage, 1918-1962. Routledge, 1996.
