= The 101 Dalmatians Musical =

Musical

- Premiere poster
- Music: Dennis DeYoung
- Lyrics: Dennis DeYoung; B. T. McNicholl
- Book: B. T. McNicholl
- Basis: The Hundred and One Dalmatians by Dodie Smith
- Productions: 2009 Minneapolis; 2009 US tour

The 101 Dalmatians Musical is a musical produced by Luis Alvarez, directed by Jerry Zaks, and sponsored by Purina Dog Chow. The music written by former Styx member Dennis DeYoung, who also co-wrote the lyrics with the musical's book author B. T. McNicholl. Based on the 1956 children's novel The Hundred and One Dalmatians written by Dodie Smith, the musical follows a pair of Dalmatian dogs as they search through London in search of their litter of fifteen puppies, which were stolen by Cruella DeVil to make dog skin fur coats. The musical features Rachel York as the infamous Cruella DeVil, and has actors sharing the stage with fifteen real Dalmatians and using stilts to simulate the novel's original canine perspective. The musical has no relation to Disney's 101 Dalmatians franchise, although Disney A to Z on the D23 website has an entry for this musical acknowledging it.

The musical was praised by critics for the cast performances, particularly York, and the innovative use of stilts and live dogs. While the plot was generally praised, several reviews noted that the plot suffered from filler and excessive scenes. Reviewers also generally found the music to be fun but forgettable.

== Plot ==
In London in 1957, a pair of Dalmatian dogs, Pongo and Missus, live with their human owners, the Dearlys, and enjoy a happy life. One day Missus gives birth to eight puppies, and the family is visited by Cruella De Vil, a former classmate of Mrs. Dearly. Cruella tries to buy the litter, but Pongo and Missus' owners refuse to sell them. She hires two men, Jasper and Jinx, to kidnap the puppies, along with many other Dalmatians in the city, to make dog-skinned fur coats. Pongo and Missus run away from home to find their puppies. With help from other dogs across the country, they find them, along with many other puppies, at Cruella's mansion and must get them back home without getting caught by the pursuing Cruella and her henchmen.

== Musical numbers ==
- "A Man's Best Friend"
- "A Perfect Family"
- "Hot Like Me"
- "There's Always Room for One More"
- "World's Greatest Dad"
- "One True Love"
- "Hail to the Chef"
- "Twilight Barking"
- "Be a Little Bit Braver"
- "Break Out"
- "Having the Crime of Our Lives"
- "Spot-On"
- "My Sweet Child"
- "Cruella Always Gets Her Way"
- "101 Dalmatians"

== Original cast ==
- James Ludwig as Pongo
- Catia Ojeda as Missus
- Mike Masters as Mr. Dearly and Horse
- Kristen Beth Williams as Mrs. Dearly and Tabby Cat
- Rachel York as Cruella De Vil
- Michael Thomas Holmes as Jasper and Gruff Yorki
- Robert Anthony Jones as Jinx
- Chuck Ragsdale as Prince
- Madeline Doherty as Nanny Butler and Gypsy wife
- Erin Maguire as Nanny Cook and Collie Inn Keeper
- Julie Foldesi as Perdita
- Sammy Borla as Lucky
- Lydia Clemente as Cadpig
- Piper Curda as Roly-Poly
- Catherine Missal as Patch

== Production ==
In 2006, theatrical producer Luis Alvarez acquired the rights to produce an adaptation of the Dodie Smith novel One Hundred and One Dalmatians. He asked director Jerry Zaks to direct, and the creative team went to Mexico to do a workshop production. B. T. McNicholl wrote the libretto based on the novel, and worked together with Dennis DeYoung, formerly of the band Styx, to craft the lyrics for the production. DeYoung acted as the primary composer for the production. In writing the songs, DeYoung notes that after reading the original novel and viewing all of the adaptations, he felt it was a children's work and that it was his "responsibility to write at least a couple of songs that kids would like to sing once they leave the theater". He used different themes for each character type, aiming to write "more traditional Broadway songs" for the humans, while using pop tunes for the dogs.

The choreographey is by Warren Carlyle. In addition to having humans playing the primarily canine characters, 15 actual Dalmatian dogs are featured in the production, trained and handled by Joel Slaven. The dogs are a mix of show dogs and ones adopted from various rescue groups around the country. After the production finished its run, the dogs were put up for adoption.

To achieve the novel's telling of the story from the canine perspective, actors portraying human characters were set on 15-inch stilts so that they would be taller than the canine characters, and the puppies are played by child actors. Rachel York was cast as the infamous Cruella DeVil. After a workshop in Mexico, The 101 Dalmatians Musical made its worldwide debut in October 2009 at the Orpheum Theatre in Minneapolis. As of 2010, it is on a nationwide tour. In January 2010, Rachel York stepped down from the role of Cruella DeVil to pursue other projects, and the role was taken over by Sara Gettelfinger. The tour was originally scheduled to run through June 2010, but the tour ended on April 18, concluding at Madison Square Garden.

== Reception ==
"It's the uber-talented Rachel York who takes the spotlight and refuses to relinquish it with her wonderfully vile portrayal of the villainous Cruella. She's big and brassy, ballsy and beautiful, clad in gorgeous black-and-red costumes that are visual feasts, with a bevy of black-and-white hairstyles that are tributes to the wigmaker's art. York's exquisitely expressive face gives her the ability to play to the theatre's farthest reaches and her clarion voice ensures that every one of her musical numbers deserve to be heard again and again".

— Jeffrey Ellis, BroadwayWorld.com, January 22, 2010

Lawson Taitte of the Dallas Morning News considered it "grand entertainment - and a pretty good musical", and felt the use of Dalmatian colored costumes, without dog features, and the use of stilts for the human characters, worked well. While he felt none of the music was memorable, he did find it fun. He particularly praised York's performance as Cruella, calling it an "over-the-top (but tasteful!) tour de force" with powerhouse vocals and sex appeal", and felt the kids were "cuter" than the live Dalmatians in the musical. The Detroit News's Eric Henrickson called it a "heartfelt family musical" and a "fun introduction to the live stage for young audiences" that had the kids in the audience...dancing in their seats" which he felt made the show "success[ful] on its most important level". He praised the introductory tune was "colorful" and "tuneful", and the musical's actors for their performances. In particular, he highlights York as a "divinely wicked Cruella" who is "the best part of the show" and Ludwig as a charming Pongo who was "underutilized". Henrickson criticized the performance for getting "bogged down in staged bits", particularly the song for Jasper and Jinx and the addition of filler to the story, and for the "disjointed hodgepodge" of musical numbers that do not "fit well together or with the setting" and found some of the choreography "more show choir than showstopper".

Sandy MacDonald of Theater Mania called it "highly enjoyable" and found the use of the stilts to be "cleaver". Cautioning against allowing young children to watch the production due to Cruella's goals, she praises York's performance, stating that she "maximiz[es] her magnificent voice and captur[es] every sadistic quirk and sneer of one of the scariest villainesses ever created". She also praised the child actors for being both "natural and engaging", the performances of Ludwig and Ojeda as Pongo and Missus, respectively. Donald V. Calamia of the Encore Michigan thought the musical successfully grabbed and held kids' attention. Calling it a "slick and gorgeously designed production", he also praised York as "delightfully and deliciously evil" who manages to avoid scaring children in the audience by using various "layers of humor". He found Maguire a "scene-stealer" and felt Foldesi's Perdita "[gave] the show heart", but also noted that the show may have trouble succeeding on Broadway due to the lack of the "'wow'factor" and moments common for the Disney-style productions the audience may be expecting. He also felt the actors, beyond York, were unable to "take his or her character to that same level of perfection or intensity" as one would expect from such a production. BroadwayWorld.com's Jerry Ellis found it "pleasantly diverting, tuneful and fun to watch" and an "expensive and imaginative production", though he notes that the actors in human roles seemed to struggle with their balance on the stilts and could have been executed better. He also felt the story was "meandering and unfocused at times", but considered the choreography to be "well-conceived and, for the most part, wonderfully performed". He highly praised the performances of the supporting cast.

In reviewing the Madison Square Garden performance, David Rooney of The New York Times panned the production, calling it a "mirthless, low-concept pantomime" and feeling that Gettelfinger's performance as Cruela DeVil was a "watered-down facsimile of a classic villainess". He felt the Dalmatian costumes were substandard and lacking in innovation and that the actors on stilts seemed to be constantly trying to maintain their balance. In discussing DeYoung's lyrics, he considered them "late-'70s-style power ballads" that lacked "emotional connection [and] suspense" and did not add anything to the story's narrative.
