= The Hundred and One Dalmatians =

1956 children's novel by Dodie Smith

- First edition cover
- Author: Dodie Smith
- Original title: The Great Dog Robbery
- Illustrator: Janet and Anne Grahame Johnstone
- Language: English
- Genre: Children's novel
- Publisher: Heinemann (United Kingdom); Viking Press (United States)
- Publication date: 1956
- Publication place: United Kingdom
- Media type: Print (hardback & paperback)
- Pages: 199
- OCLC: 1111487296
- Followed by: The Starlight Barking (1967)

The Hundred and One Dalmatians is a 1956 children's novel by Dodie Smith about the kidnapping of a family of Dalmatian puppies. It was originally serialised in Woman's Day as The Great Dog Robbery, and details the adventures of two dalmatians named Pongo and Missis as they rescue their puppies from a fur farm. A 1967 sequel, The Starlight Barking, continues from the end of the novel.

== Plot summary ==
Dalmatians Pongo and Missis live with the newly married Mr. and Mrs. Dearly and their two nannies, Nanny Cook and Nanny Butler. Mr. Dearly is a "financial wizard" who has been granted lifelong tax exemption and lent a house on the Outer Circle in Regent's Park in return for wiping out the government debt. The dogs consider the humans their pets but allow them to think that they are the owners.

One day, while walking Pongo and Missis, Mr. and Mrs. Dearly have a chance meeting with an old schoolmate of Mrs. Dearly, Cruella de Vil, a wealthy woman so fixated on fur clothing that she married a furrier and forces him to keep his collection in their home so she can wear the pieces whenever she likes. She admires the two dogs and expresses a desire to have a Dalmatian-skin coat. Later, Missis gives birth to a litter of 15 puppies. Concerned that Missis will not be able to feed them all, the humans join in to help. As Mrs. Dearly looks for a canine wet nurse, she finds an exhausted liver-spotted Dalmatian in the middle of the road in the rain. She has the dog, who has recently given birth, treated by a vet and names her Perdita (meaning "lost"). Perdita helps to nurse the pups and becomes a member of the family. She tells Pongo about her lost love Prince and the resulting litter of puppies, which were sold by her neglectful owner. She had run away looking for those puppies.

Cruella happened to be in the house when the puppies started to arrive, and had expressed a desire to buy them, which was rebuffed. After she pays a second visit to the house and is told again that the Dearlys have no intention of putting the puppies up for sale, she hires thieves to steal them for her. The humans fail to trace the pups, but through the "Twilight Barking", a forum of communication in which dogs can relay messages to each other across the country, Pongo and Missis track them down to "Hell Hall", the ancestral home of the de Vil family in Suffolk, and decide to rescue the puppies. After a journey across the English countryside, with food and accommodation along the way arranged by dogs through the Barking Network, they meet the Colonel, an Old English Sheepdog. They get inside the mansion and discover that there are 97 puppies there, including Pongo and Missis's own 15.

Fearing police investigation, Cruella arrives and tells the Baddun brothers, whom she left in charge of Hell Hall, that they soon must slaughter and skin the dogs. Pongo and Missis realise they must rescue all of the puppies, who escape the night before Christmas Eve. One puppy, Cadpig, is a runt and too weak to walk the distance from Suffolk to London; Tommy, the Colonel's two-year-old owner, willingly lends her his toy farm cart. One litter of eight puppies is just the right age for two of its members to fit the cart's shaft, so they pull it in shifts.

The Dalmatians are nearly captured by Romani people, and one of the Barking Network dogs points out how conspicuous they are and helps them break into a chimney sweep's establishment, where they roll in soot to disguise themselves. They travel across the fields and spend part of an evening in a church; Cruella nearly overtakes them when they are forced to return to the road, but they hide in an empty removal van at the invitation of a Staffordshire terrier whose "pets" own the van and are returning to London that night.

Once the dogs arrive in London, Cruella's Persian cat, who has been longing to avenge her many litters of kittens (all of which Cruella drowned), sees an opportunity and lets the dogs into Cruella's house, where they destroy her husband's entire stock of unpaid-for furs. The Dalmatians then return to the Dearlys' house. Pongo and Missis bark until Mr. Dearly opens the door, whereupon the whole mass of puppies streams inside and rolls on the carpet to remove the soot from their coats. The Dearlys recognise them and send out for steaks to feed them. The litter that pulled Cadpig's cart are proven to be Perdita's litter by Prince. Mr. Dearly finds out where the puppies had been when he discovers a label on the toy cart, which contains Tommy's name and address. The Dearlys also place advertisements seeking the owners of the other puppies, but it turns out that they had all been bought, rather than stolen as the Dearlys' were. Perdita's former owner, who never really cared for her, is happy to sell her to the Dearlys upon hearing the story.

Cruella's now-homeless cat drops by (and is invited to stay) with the news that the destruction of Mr de Vil's fur business has forced Cruella to leave the country and put Hell Hall up for sale. When the Dearlys visit Suffolk to return Tommy's cart, they realise that, with 97 puppies and three adult Dalmatians, a larger home would be a good idea, so Mr. Dearly buys the hall with money he has been given by the government for sorting out another tax problem. He proposes to use it to start a "dynasty of Dalmatians" (and a "dynasty of Dearlys" to take care of them). Finally, Perdita's lost love, Prince, turns up. His owners see his love for Perdita, and allow him to stay with the Dearlys and become their "one hundred and oneth" Dalmatian.

== Adaptations ==
Walt Disney adapted the novel into an animated film, released to cinemas on 25 January 1961 as One Hundred and One Dalmatians. It became the tenth highest-grossing film of 1961, and one of the studio's most popular films of the decade. It was re-issued to cinemas four times, in 1969, 1979, 1985, and 1991. The 1991 reissue was the twentieth highest earning film of the year for domestic earnings. It was remade into a live action film in 1996.

In both the live-action and animated adaptations, there is only one nanny, Missis and Perdita are combined into one character, and other characters (such as many of the other dogs, Prince, Tommy, Cruella's cat, and Cruella's husband) were omitted. In the animated film, Pongo and Missis's owners' last names were changed to "Radcliffe" from "Dearly", and in the live-action film, Cruella (portrayed by Glenn Close) appears as the spoiled magnate of an haute couture fashion house, "House of DeVil". Disney kept the book's characters Horace and Jasper Baddun in both versions, but represented them as the thieves hired by Cruella to steal Pongo and Missis's puppies. In the novel, Horace is named Saul, and they are merely caretakers, the puppies having been stolen by hired professional thieves some days before.

Disney Television Animation later created an animated television series (co-produced with Jumbo Pictures) starring three of the puppies (Lucky, Rolly and Cadpig), and a second series that stars mostly descendants of Pongo and Perdita. Disney also released a sequel film for each of their film versions (102 Dalmatians (2000) and 101 Dalmatians II: Patch's London Adventure (2003)), but both were largely criticised for poor story and lack of originality. In 2021, Disney released a live-action reboot of the franchise, titled Cruella, which revolves around the origin of the title character and her partnership with Jasper and Horace.

The novel has been adapted for the stage by Debbie Isitt for the Belgrade Theatre, Coventry in 2000 (followed by productions at the Royal & Derngate, Northampton in 2007 and Birmingham Repertory Theatre in 2017), by Bryony Lavery for the Chichester Youth Theatre in 2014 and was devised by the company (directed by Sally Cookson) for Tobacco Factory Theatres in 2014. The novel was also adapted into a 2009 musical which opened in Minneapolis prior to a US tour. Another stage musical adaptation was due to open at Regent's Park Open Air Theatre in 2020, before being postponed twice to 2022 due to the COVID-19 pandemic.

In 1996, the BBC adapted Dodie Smith's novel into a full-cast musical audio dramatisation, starring Patricia Hodge as Cruella. This version is very faithful to the source material, in that it has all the characters, but events are slightly changed – Cruella's husband argues with her more than in the novel, and they do not leave London after the destruction of the fur stocks, nor do the Dearlys ever find out she was the mastermind. Furthermore, Perdita and Prince's story is greatly abridged, Mrs. Willow helps the Colonel attack the Badduns to prevent them following the Dalmatians, and the White Cat does not join the family until after the move to Suffolk. Amazon Audible later released this production as an Audiobook, available for streaming online or through the app.

== Reception ==
The book gained a positive response from critics.

The British writer Siobhan Dowd has cited the thieving Romani characters in the book as one example of a long history of anti-Romani stereotypes in English literature.
