= Dodie Smith =

English novelist and playwright (1896–1990)

- Smith in the 1930s
- Born: Dorothy Gladys Smith; 3 May 1896; Whitefield, Lancashire, England
- Died: 24 November 1990 (aged 94); Uttlesford, Essex, England
- Education: St Paul's Girls' School; Royal Academy of Dramatic Art
- Occupations: Novelist; playwright
- Spouse: Alec Macbeth Beesley (m. 1939; died 1987)
- Writing career
- Pen name: C. L. Anthony; Charles Henry Percy
- Language: English
- Genre: Children's literature
- Notable works: The Hundred and One Dalmatians; I Capture the Castle

Dorothy Gladys "Dodie" Smith (3 May 1896 – 24 November 1990) was an English novelist and playwright. She is best known for writing I Capture the Castle (1948) and the children's novel The Hundred and One Dalmatians (1956). Other works include Dear Octopus (1938) and The Starlight Barking (1967). The Hundred and One Dalmatians was adapted into a 1961 animated film and a 1996 live-action film, both produced by Disney. Her novel I Capture the Castle was voted number 82 as "one of the nation's 100 best-loved novels" by the British public as part of the BBC's The Big Read (2003), and was adapted into a film released the same year.

== Biography ==
=== Early life ===
Smith was born on 3 May 1896 in a house named Stoneycroft (number 118 - now 167) on Bury New Road, Whitefield, near Bury in Lancashire, England. She was an only child. Her parents were Ernest and Ella Smith (née Furber). Ernest was a bank manager; he died in 1898 when Dodie was two years old. Dodie and her mother moved to Old Trafford to live with her grandparents, William and Margaret Furber. Dodie's childhood home, Kingston House, was at 609 Stretford Road, and faced the Manchester Ship Canal. She lived with her mother, maternal grandparents, two aunts and three uncles.

In Smith's autobiography Look Back with Love (1974), she credits her grandfather William as one of three reasons she became a playwright. He was an avid theatregoer, and they had long talks about Shakespeare and melodrama. The second reason was that her uncle Harold Furber, an amateur actor, read plays with her and introduced her to contemporary drama. Thirdly, her mother had wanted to be an actress, an ambition frustrated except for walk-on parts, once in the company of Sarah Bernhardt. Smith wrote her first play at the age of ten, and she began acting in minor roles during her teens at the Manchester Athenaeum Dramatic Society. There is a blue plaque commemorating the building where Dorothy grew up. The formative years of Dorothy's childhood were spent at this house.

=== Move to London ===
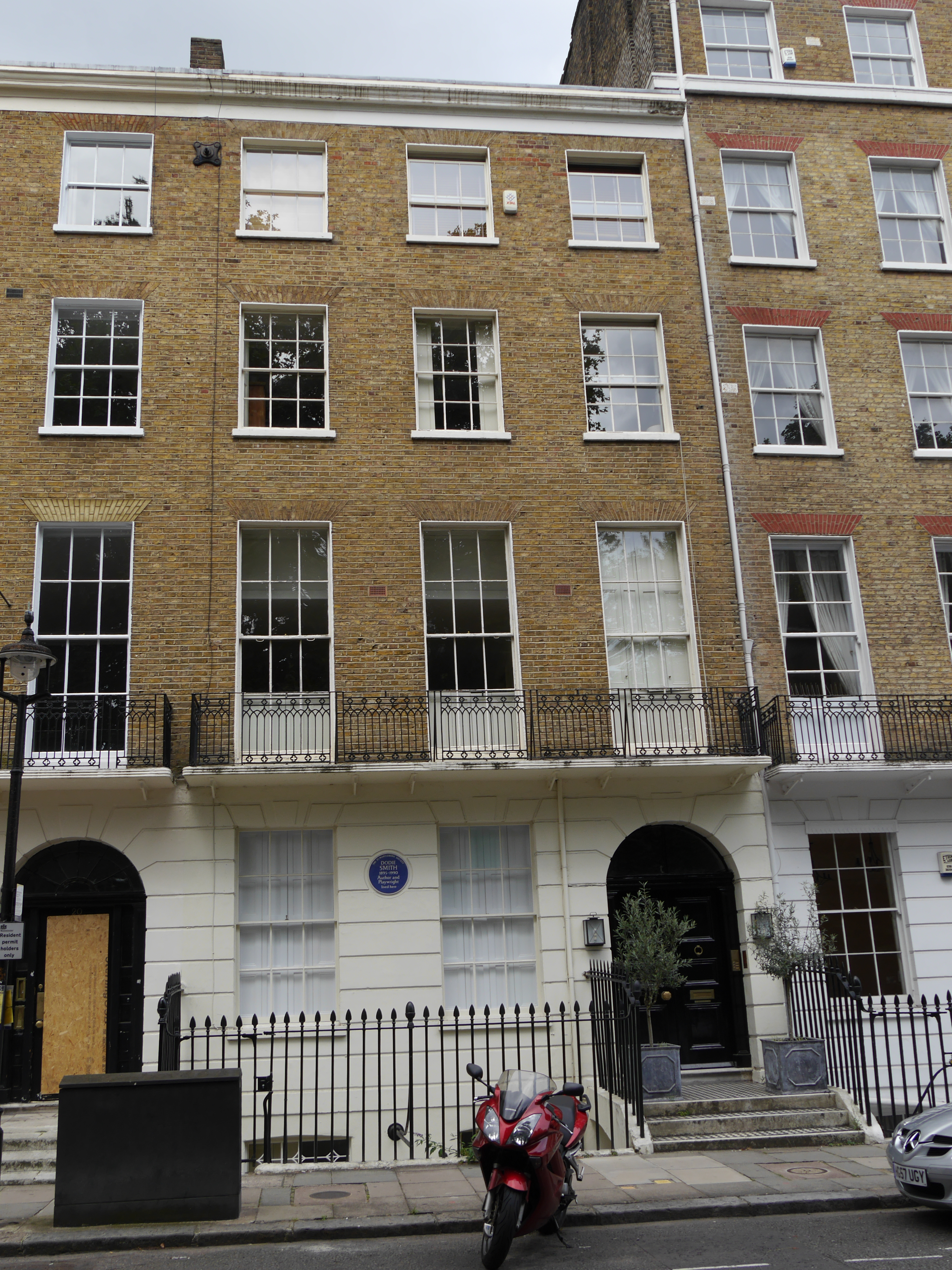
18 Dorset Square, London

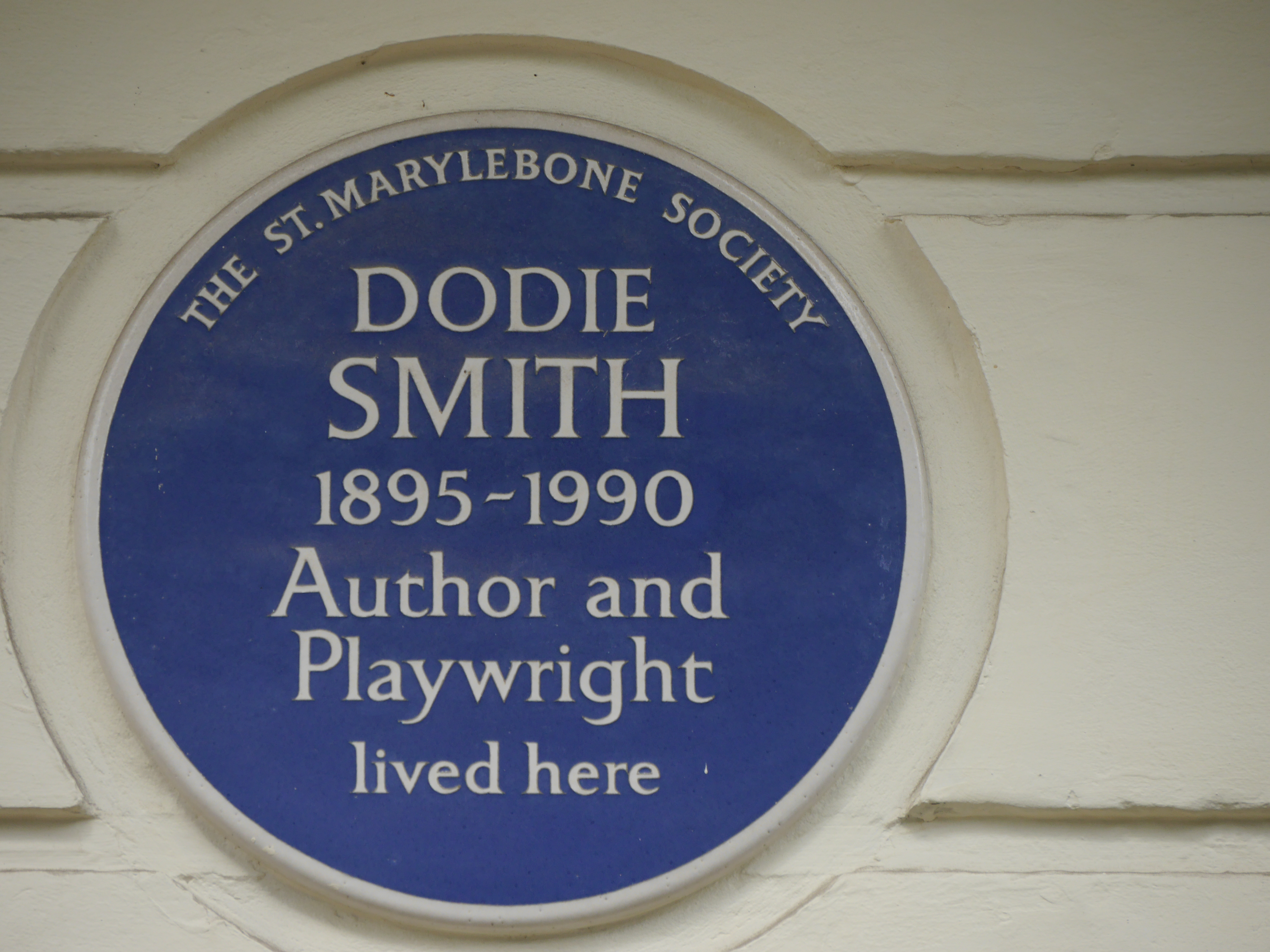
Blue plaque, 18 Dorset Square

In 1910 Ella remarried and moved to London with her new husband and the 14-year-old Dodie, who attended school both in Manchester and at St Paul's Girls' School, London. In 1914 Dodie entered the Royal Academy of Dramatic Art (RADA). Her first role came in Arthur Wing Pinero's play Playgoers. Other roles after RADA included a Chinese girl in Mr. Wu, a parlour maid in Ye Gods, and a young mother in Niobe, which was directed by Basil Dean, who would later buy her play Autumn Crocus.

She was also in the Portsmouth Repertory Theatre, travelled with a YMCA company to entertain troops in France during World War I, toured with the French comedy French Leave, and appeared as Anne in Galsworthy's play The Pigeon at the Everyman Theatre and at a festival in Zürich, Switzerland. While Ella was dying of breast cancer, she and Dodie became devotees of Christian Science.

=== Career after acting ===
Even though Smith had sold a movie script, Schoolgirl Rebels, using the pseudonym Charles Henry Percy, and written a one-act play, British Talent, that premiered at the Three Arts Club in 1924, she still had a hard time finding steady work. In 1923, she accepted a job in Heal and Son's furniture store in London and became the toy buyer (and mistress of the chairman, Ambrose Heal). She wrote her first staged play, Autumn Crocus, in 1931 using the pseudonym C.L. Anthony. Its success, and the discovery of her identity by journalists, inspired the newspaper headline, "Shopgirl Writes Play". The show starred Fay Compton and Francis Lederer.

Smith's fourth play Call It a Day was acted by the Theatre Guild on 28 January 1936 and ran for 194 performances. It ran in London for 509 performances, the longest run of any of Smith's plays to date. American critic Joseph Wood Krutch compared it favorably to George S. Kaufman and Edna Ferber's play Dinner at Eight and Edward Knoblock's Grand Hotel. He said the London production "stays pretty consistently on the level of comedy and imposes upon its brittle structure no greater emotional weight than that structure is capable of bearing."

The success of Call It a Day enabled Smith to purchase The Barretts, a cottage near the village of Finchingfield, Essex. Her next play, Bonnet Over the Windmill (1937), was not as successful. It concerns three aspiring young actresses and their landlady, a middle-aged former music-hall performer, and the young women's attempts to attract the attention of a playwright and a theatre producer with hopes of obtaining dramatic roles.

Her next play, Dear Octopus (1938), featured Dame Marie Tempest and Sir John Gielgud. The unusual title refers to a toast in the play: "To the family—that dear octopus from whose tentacles we never quite escape, nor, in our inmost hearts, ever quite wish to." Brooks Atkinson termed Smith a "domestic panoramatist" and compared her to many English novelists, from Samuel Richardson to Archibald Marshall; he also described her as the "appointed recorder" of the English family. The production in London ran for 376 performances, compared to that in New York of only 53.

When Smith travelled to America to cast Dear Octopus, she brought with her Alec Macbeth Beesley (son of Titanic survivor Lawrence Beesley), who had also worked at Heal's and had become her longtime friend and business manager. The two married in 1939. She would not have another play staged in London until 1952, though Lovers and Friends did play at the Plymouth Theatre in 1943. The show featured Katharine Cornell and Raymond Massey.

Smith lived for many years in Dorset Square, Marylebone, London, which a blue plaque now commemorates; her date of birth is shown inaccurately as 1895 instead of 1896.

=== Later life ===
During the 1940s Smith and Beesley relocated to the United States to avoid difficulties due to his being a conscientious objector. She felt homesick for Britain, which inspired her first novel, written in Doylestown, Pennsylvania, named I Capture the Castle (1948). She and Beesley also spent time in Beverly Hills, Malibu, and Wilton, Connecticut.

During their American interlude, the couple became friends with writers Christopher Isherwood, Charles Brackett and John Van Druten. In her memoirs Smith credits Beesley with suggesting to Van Druten that he adapt Isherwood's Sally Bowles story Goodbye to Berlin into a play (the Van Druten play, I Am a Camera, later became the musical Cabaret). In her memoirs, Smith acknowledges having received writing advice from her friend, the novelist A. J. Cronin.

Smith's first play back in London, Letter from Paris, was an adaptation of Henry James's short novel The Reverberator. She used the adapting style of William Archibald's play The Innocents (adapted from The Turn of the Screw) and Ruth and Augustus Goetz's play The Heiress (adapted from Washington Square).

In the 1970s she lived in Stambourne, Essex.

=== Death ===
Smith died in 1990 (three years after Beesley) in Uttlesford, north Essex, England. She was cremated and her ashes scattered to the wind. She had named Julian Barnes as her literary executor, a job she thought would not involve much work. Barnes writes of the complicated task in his essay "Literary Executions", revealing among other things how he secured the return of the film rights to I Capture the Castle, which had been owned by Disney since 1949. Smith's personal papers are housed in Boston University's Howard Gotlieb Archival Research Center, and include manuscripts, photographs, artwork and correspondence (including letters from Christopher Isherwood and John Gielgud).

== The Hundred and One Dalmatians ==
Smith and Beesley loved dogs and kept Dalmatians as pets; at one point the couple had nine of them. The first was named Pongo, which became the name Smith used for the canine protagonist of her The Hundred and One Dalmatians novel. Smith had the idea for the novel when one of her friends observed a group of her Dalmatians and said "Those dogs would make a lovely fur coat".

The novel has been adapted by Disney twice, an animated film in 1961 called One Hundred and One Dalmatians and a live-action film in 1996 called 101 Dalmatians. Although both of the Disney films spawned a sequel film, 101 Dalmatians II: Patch's London Adventure and 102 Dalmatians, neither sequel has any connection to Smith's own sequel, The Starlight Barking. There have also been two animated series connected to Disney's original film, 101 Dalmatians: The Series (1997–1998) and 101 Dalmatian Street (2019–2020).

== Works ==
=== Autobiography ===
- Look Back with Love: A Manchester Childhood (1974)
- Look Back with Mixed Feelings (1978)
- Look Back with Astonishment (1979)
- Look Back with Gratitude (1985)

=== Novels ===
- I Capture the Castle (1948)
- The Hundred and One Dalmatians (1956)
- The New Moon with the Old (1963)
- The Town in Bloom (1965)
- It Ends with Revelations (1967)
- The Starlight Barking (1967)
- A Tale of Two Families (1970)
- The Girl from the Candle-lit Bath (1978)
- The Midnight Kittens (1978)

=== Plays ===
- Autumn Crocus (1931)
- Service (1932)
- Touch Wood (1934)
- Call It a Day (1935)
- Bonnet Over the Windmill (1937)
- Dear Octopus (1938)
- Lovers and Friends (1943)
- Letter from Paris (1952)
- I Capture the Castle (1954)
- These People, Those Books (1958)
- Amateur Means Lover (1961)

=== Screenplays ===
- The Uninvited (1944), written by Smith and Frank Partos
- Darling, How Could You! (1951), written by Smith and Lesser Samuels

== Film adaptations ==
- Looking Forward (1933) based on Service
- Autumn Crocus (1934)
- Call It a Day (1937)
- Dear Octopus (1943)
- The First Day of Spring (1956), based on Call It a Day
- One Hundred and One Dalmatians (1961)
- 101 Dalmatians (1996)
- I Capture the Castle (2003)

Film sequels unconnected with Smith's own The Starlight Barking.

- 102 Dalmatians (2000)
- 101 Dalmatians II: Patch's London Adventure (2003)
- Cruella (2021)
