= 101 Dalmatians (1996 film) =

1996 film by Stephen Herek

- Theatrical release poster
- Directed by: Stephen Herek
- Screenplay by: John Hughes
- Based on: The Hundred and One Dalmatians by: Dodie Smith; One Hundred and One Dalmatians; by Bill Peet
- Produced by: John Hughes; Ricardo Mestres
- Starring: Glenn Close; Jeff Daniels; Joely Richardson; Joan Plowright
- Cinematography: Adrian Biddle
- Edited by: Trudy Ship
- Music by: Michael Kamen
- Production companies: Walt Disney Pictures; Great Oaks Entertainment
- Distributed by: Buena Vista Pictures Distribution
- Release dates: November 18, 1996 (Radio City Music Hall); November 27, 1996 (United States)
- Running time: 103 minutes
- Country: United States
- Language: English
- Budget: $67 million
- Box office: $320.7 million

101 Dalmatians is a 1996 American adventure comedy film directed by Stephen Herek and written by John Hughes. It is a live-action remake of Walt Disney's 1961 animated film, which was based on the 1956 novel The Hundred and One Dalmatians. The film stars Glenn Close, Jeff Daniels, Joely Richardson and Joan Plowright. It was produced by Walt Disney Pictures and Great Oaks Entertainment. Unlike the 1961 original film, none of the animal characters speak.

101 Dalmatians was released by Buena Vista Pictures Distribution on November 27, 1996, and grossed $321 million against a $67 million budget, making it the sixth-highest-grossing film of 1996. It received mixed reviews from critics with praise for Glenn Close's performance but criticisms for its pointless comparison to the original. Close was nominated for the Golden Globe Award for Best Actress, while the film was nominated for a BAFTA Award for Best Makeup and Hair. A sequel, 102 Dalmatians, was released in 2000.

== Plot ==
American video game designer Roger Dearly lives with his pet Dalmatian Pongo in London. Roger develops a video game featuring a dog chase, but it is rejected because the villain is inadequate. His attempts to redesign the game prove unsatisfactory.

One day during a walk, Pongo sets his eyes on Perdita, another Dalmatian. After a chase that ends in St James's Park, Roger discovers that Pongo likes Perdita. Her owner, Anita Campbell-Green, falls in love with Roger when they meet. When they return to Roger's home, Anita accepts his proposal. They get married along with Perdita and Pongo. Anita works as a fashion designer at the House of de Vil. Her boss, Cruella de Vil, has a deep passion for fur, going so far as to have a taxidermist, Mr. Skinner, skin a white tiger at the London Zoo to make her into a rug for her. Anita, inspired by her Dalmatian, designs a coat made with spotted fur. Cruella is intrigued by the idea of making garments out of actual Dalmatians, and finds it amusing that it would seem as if she was wearing Anita's dog.

Perdita gets pregnant, and so does Anita. Cruella visits their home and becomes excited when she learns that Perdita is expecting. Weeks later, she returns when a litter of 15 puppies are born and offers Roger and Anita £7,500 for them, but they refuse. Enraged, Cruella fires Anita, saying she'll never work in fashion again and vows revenge against her and Roger. One winter evening, she has her henchmen, Jasper and Horace, break into their home and steal the puppies, while the couple is walking in the park with Pongo and Perdita. Along with 84 other Dalmatians that were previously stolen, they deliver them to her broken-down country estate, De Vil Mansion. Cruella asks Skinner to kill and skin them to create her coat.

With the family devastated at the loss of their puppies, Pongo uses the twilight bark to carry the message via the dogs and other animals of the United Kingdom, while Roger and Anita notify the police. Anita realizes Cruella was behind the kidnappings and confirms her suspicion when she shows Roger and Nanny her portfolio. An Airedale Terrier named Kipper follows Jasper and Horace to the mansion, and finds all of the puppies, who he helps escape under the duo's noses. They make their way to a nearby farm, where they are later joined by Pongo and Perdita. Cruella arrives at the mansion and discovers what has happened. Angry with the thieves' failure, she decides to carry out the job herself. After several mishaps, Jasper and Horace discover nearby police looking for Cruella and hand themselves in, joining Skinner who was attacked in defense while trying to capture a puppy who had been left behind. Cruella tracks the puppies to the farm and tries to capture them, but the farm animals incapacitate her. The police arrive and arrest Cruella, before sending the puppies home.

Pongo, Perdita and their puppies are reunited with Roger, Anita and Nanny. After being informed that the remaining 84 puppies have no home to go to, as they have not yet been claimed by any owners, they decide to adopt them. Roger finally creates a successful video game, featuring Dalmatian puppies as the protagonists and Cruella as the villain. With this success, they move out of London to the countryside with their millions. Roger and Anita have a baby girl, while the dogs grow up with puppies of their own.

== Cast ==
- Jeff Daniels as Roger Dearly, Pongo's owner, Anita's husband, who works as a video game designer.
- Glenn Close as Cruella de Vil, the ruthless and eccentric head of the prestigious London fashion house, House of DeVil, who intends to make a fur coat out of Dalmatian
- Joely Richardson as Anita Dearly, Perdita's owner, Roger's wife, and a fashion designer at the House of DeVil.
- Joan Plowright as Nanny, Anita's childhood nanny, and the Dearlys' warm and protective cook and housekeeper.
- Hugh Laurie as Jasper, one of the two bumbling and argumentative crooks hired by Cruella to kidnap the puppies.
- Mark Williams as Horace, Jasper's dim-witted partner who assists in the kidnapping.
- John Shrapnel as Mr. Skinner, a silent and menacing professional taxidermist hired by Cruella to skin the puppies.
- Tim McInnerny as Alonzo, Cruella's mistreated and nervous personal butler.
- Hugh Fraser as Frederick, Anita's colleague at the House of DeVil.
- Zohren Weiss as Herbert
- Brian Capron as television news reporter
- Frank Welker as the voice of Pongo and Perdita (creature sounds; uncredited)

== Production ==
The animatronic creatures used in the film are provided by Jim Henson's Creature Shop. Producer Edward S. Feldman guaranteed the adoption of every puppy used in the film. Over 300 Dalmatian puppies were used over the course of filming, because "we could only use them when they were 5 or 6 weeks old and at their cutest." Filming took place at Shepperton Studios in London.

Writer John Hughes approached Glenn Close for the role of Cruella de Vil, but she initially turned it down. The film's costume designer, Anthony Powell, was working with Close on the Broadway show Sunset Boulevard and convinced her to take the role.

Minster Court was used as the exterior of Cruella de Vil's fashion house. Sarum Chase was used as the exterior of her home. Cruella's car is a modified 1976 Panther De Ville.

== Release ==
=== Box office ===
101 Dalmatians was released in the United States on November 27, 1996. The UK premiere of the film was held on December 4, 1996, at the Royal Albert Hall, London, and the exterior of the Hall was lit with dalmatian spots. It grossed $136.2 million in North America and $320.7 million worldwide.

=== Home media ===
101 Dalmatians was released on VHS for the first time on April 15, 1997, LaserDisc in early 1997, and on DVD on April 21, 1998. It was re-released on September 16, 2008.

=== Video game ===
- A handheld LCD game based on the film was released in 1996 by Tiger Electronics.
- The 1997 Disney's Animated Storybook (CD-ROM for PC) adaptation uses elements of this film, along with the original animated movie.
- A video game based on the film entitled 101 Dalmatians: Escape from DeVil Manor was released in May 1997.

== Reception ==
On Rotten Tomatoes, 101 Dalmatians has an approval rating of 39% based on 36 reviews. The site's critic consensus reads: "Neat performance from Glenn Close aside, 101 Dalmatians is a bland, pointless remake." On Metacritic the film has a weighted average score of 50 out of 100, based on 20 critics, indicating "mixed or average" reviews. Audiences surveyed by CinemaScore gave the film an average grade of "A" on an A+ to F scale.

Roger Ebert of the Chicago Sun-Times gave the film two and a half stars out of four and said, "For older viewers, 101 Dalmatians may seem closer to the artistic level of the Beethoven dog adventures than the mid-level Disney classic that inspired it. Hint: Don't wear your fur coat to the movie."

== Controversy ==
Animal rights organizations protested the film's release, saying that Dalmatian sales shot up after the premiere, fueled by impulsive purchases of puppies by parents for their children. Being ill-prepared to care for a relatively difficult breed of dog past puppy-hood, many of these new owners eventually surrendered their animals to shelters, where many dogs ended up being euthanized.

== Sequel ==
A sequel, 102 Dalmatians, was released on November 22, 2000. Glenn Close and Tim McInnerny returned in their roles.
