= 101 Dalmatians (franchise) =

Disney media franchise

- Official franchise logo
- Created by: Walt Disney; Dodie Smith
- Original work: One Hundred and One Dalmatians (1961)
- Owner: The Walt Disney Company
- Years: 1961–present
- Based on: The Hundred and One Dalmatians by Dodie Smith

Films and television
- Films: One Hundred and One Dalmatians (1961); 101 Dalmatians (1996); 102 Dalmatians (2000); Cruella (2021)
- Television series: Once Upon a Time (2014–2016)‡
- Animated series: 101 Dalmatians: The Series (1997–1998); House of Mouse (2001–2003); 101 Dalmatian Street (2019–2020)†
- Television film: Descendants (2015)‡
- Direct-to-video: 101 Dalmatians II: Patch's London Adventure (2003)

Games
- Video games: 101 Dalmatians Print Studio (1997); Disney's Animated Storybook: 101 Dalmatians (1997); 101 Dalmatians: Escape from DeVil Manor (1997); 102 Dalmatians: Puppies to the Rescue (2000)

Audio
- Soundtracks: One Hundred and One Dalmatians (1961); Cruella (2021)
- ^{†} 101 Dalmatian Street had sneak peek airings in 2018 before its official debut in 2019.; ^{‡} Work contains characters based on those from this franchise.

101 Dalmatians is an American media franchise owned by The Walt Disney Company and based on Dodie Smith's 1956 novel The Hundred and One Dalmatians. It began in 1961 with the release of the traditionally animated feature film One Hundred and One Dalmatians. Various adaptations produced from Disney have been released over the years.

== Origin ==
The source for the first film is the 1956 novel The Hundred and One Dalmatians, written by Dodie Smith. From this The Walt Disney Company developed and expanded the franchise into other media. Smith wrote a 1967 sequel, The Starlight Barking, but this has not been used as source material for any of Disney's work.

== Films ==
=== Animation ===
Film	U.S. release date	Directed by	Written by	Produced by
One Hundred and One Dalmatians	January 25, 1961	Wolfgang Reitherman, Hamilton S. Luske & Clyde Geronimi	Bill Peet	Walt Disney
101 Dalmatians II: Patch's London Adventure	January 21, 2003	Jim Kammerud & Brian Smith	Story by : Jim Kammerud, Dan Root, Garrett K. Schiff & Brian Smith; Screenplay by : Jim Kammerud & Brian Smith	Carolyn Bates & Leslie Hough

==== One Hundred and One Dalmatians (1961) ====
A 1961 American animated adventure comedy film produced by Walt Disney based on the novel by Dodie Smith, it was originally released in theaters on January 25, 1961 by Buena Vista Distribution.

==== 101 Dalmatians II: Patch's London Adventure (2003) ====
A 2003 American animated direct-to-video adventure comedy film produced by Disney Television Animation, and released by Walt Disney Home Entertainment on January 21, 2003, the film is the sequel to the 1961 Disney animated film One Hundred and One Dalmatians.

The plot involves the titular scrappy puppy who must come to the rescue of his 98 siblings, after villainous Cruella dognaps them once again.

=== Live-action ===
Film	U.S. release date	Directed by	Written by	Produced by
Original series
101 Dalmatians	November 27, 1996	Stephen Herek	John Hughes	John Hughes & Ricardo Mestres
102 Dalmatians	November 22, 2000	Kevin Lima	Story by : Kristen Buckley & Brian Regan; Screenplay by : Kristen Buckley, Brian Regan, Bob Tzudiker & Noni White	Edward S. Feldman
Cruella series
Cruella	May 28, 2021	Craig Gillespie	Story by : Aline Brosh McKenna, Kelly Marcel & Steve Zissis; Screenplay by : Dana Fox & Tony McNamara	Andrew Gunn, Marc Platt & Kristin Burr
Untitled Cruella sequel	TBA	Craig Gillespie	Tony McNamara	TBA

==== 101 Dalmatians films ====
===== 101 Dalmatians (1996) =====
A 1996 American live-action family comedy film written and produced by John Hughes and directed by Stephen Herek. It is the second adaptation of Dodie Smith's 1956 novel The Hundred and One Dalmatians produced by Walt Disney Pictures following the 1961 animated adventure comedy film of the same name. The film stars Glenn Close as Cruella de Vil and Jeff Daniels as Roger, the owner of the 101 dalmatians.

===== 102 Dalmatians (2000) =====
A 2000 British-American live-action family comedy film directed by Kevin Lima in his directorial debut and produced by Walt Disney Pictures. It is the sequel to the 1996 film 101 Dalmatians and stars Glenn Close reprising her role as Cruella de Vil as she attempts to steal puppies for her "grandest" fur coat yet. Among the puppies she plans to use are the children of Dipstick, a son of Pongo and Perdita. Glenn Close and Tim McInnerny were the only actors from the first film to return for the sequel.

===== Future =====
In May 2021, Glenn Close revealed that while working on Cruella as an executive producer, she wrote a new story as a sequel to the films where she would reprise the role of Cruella de Vil. The plot would involve the character in New York City.

==== Cruella films ====
===== Cruella (2021) =====
A prequel film with a standalone continuity, centered around Cruella de Vil titled Cruella, an origin story of the character, and take place during the 1970s starring Emma Stone as the titular character with Emma Thompson, Paul Walter Hauser, Joel Fry, Mark Strong, Emily Beecham and Kirby Howell-Baptiste co-starring in supporting roles. The film was directed by Craig Gillespie with a screenplay by Dana Fox and Tony McNamara, from a story by Aline Brosh McKenna, Kelly Marcel, and Steve Zissis. Andrew Gunn and Marc Platt served as producers, and Glenn Close served as the executive producer. Costume designer Jenny Beavan later stated that Close's role on the film's production was to help Stone appear as a younger 1970s portrayal of Close's role in 101 Dalmatians.

The film was scheduled to be theatrically released on December 23, 2020, but was later pushed back to May 28, 2021 due to the COVID-19 pandemic. The film was eventually released on that date, both theatrically and on Disney+ with Premier Access.

===== Untitled Cruella sequel =====
Craig Gillespie and each of the film's respective stars expressed interest in a sequel that would have the style of The Godfather Part II. By June 2021, a sequel was announced to be officially in development. Gillespie will return as director with a script by Tony McNamara. In August 2021, Stone closed a deal to reprise her role in the sequel.

=== Additional crew and production details ===
Film	Crew/Detail					
Film	Composer	Cinematographer	Editor	Production companies	Distributing companies	Running time
One Hundred and One Dalmatians	George Bruns		Roy M. Brewer, Jr. Donald Halliday	Walt Disney Productions	Buena Vista Distribution Company	1hr 19mins
101 Dalmatians II: Patch's London Adventure	Richard Gibbs		Ron Price; Robert S. Bichard	Walt Disney Television Animation	Walt Disney Studios Home Entertainment	1hr 14mins
101 Dalmatians	Michael Kamen	Adrian Biddle	Trudy Ship	Wizzer Productions; Walt Disney Pictures; Great Oaks Entertainment	Buena Vista Pictures Distribution	1hr 43mins
102 Dalmatians	David Newman	Adrian Biddle	Gregory Perler	Cruella Productions; Walt Disney Pictures; Kanzaman S.A.M. Films	Buena Vista Pictures Distribution	1hr 40mins
Cruella	Nicholas Britell	Nicolas Karakatsanis	Tatiana S. Riegel	Walt Disney Pictures; Gunn Films; Marc Platt Productions	Walt Disney Studios Motion Pictures	2hrs 14mins

== Television series ==
Series	Season	Segments	Episodes	Originally released		
Series	Season	Segments	Episodes	First released	Last released	Network
101 Dalmatians: The Series	1	23	13	September 13, 1997	January 10, 1998	ABC (One Saturday Morning)
101 Dalmatians: The Series	2	82	52	September 1, 1997	March 4, 1998	Syndication (Disney-Kellogg Alliance)
101 Dalmatian Street	1	47	26	March 18, 2019	February 22, 2020	Disney Channel

=== 101 Dalmatians: The Series (1997–1998) ===
An American animated television series produced by Walt Disney Television Animation in association with Jumbo Pictures. The show ran from September 1, 1997 to March 4, 1998 on ABC and the Disney-Kellogg Alliance for two seasons of 65 episodes. It is based on a combination of the 1961 original animated film, and its 1996 live-action remake. The series as a whole, follows the adventures of the numerous puppies from the Disney franchise. Three puppies in particular, Lucky, Rolly and Cadpig, are the main focus of the show along with their friend Spot, a chicken who wants to be a dog.

=== 101 Dalmatian Street (2019–2020) ===
A British animated television comedy series produced by Passion Animation Studios, set in 21st-century London, which follows the adventures of Dylan and his sister Dolly. Dylan and Dolly are descendants of Pongo and Perdita, who protect and take care of their 97 younger siblings. After first airing sneak peeks in December 2018, the series officially premiered in the UK on March 18, 2019, and concluded on February 22, 2020 for 26 episodes.

== Related productions ==
=== Once Upon a Time ===
An alternate version based on the Disney version of Cruella de Vil appears in the fourth and fifth seasons of the live-action television series Once Upon a Time, where she is portrayed by Victoria Smurfit. In the series, Cruella is a witch who possesses the power to control animals. Smurfit also played another alternate version of the character in the series' penultimate episode, "Homecoming".

=== Descendants ===
Cruella de Vil appears in the 2015 American live-action musical Disney Channel Original Movie Descendants, where she is portrayed by Wendy Raquel Robinson.

The film's plot involves Ben, the teenage son of King Beast and Queen Belle, who invites the exiled children of defeated villains to attend a preparatory school with the heroes' children; among them is Carlos, the 14-year-old son of Cruella, whom she abuses and treats like a servant, making him sleep near the bear traps she uses to guard her fur coats. Along with other villains, Cruella has been exiled to the Isle of the Lost, where she has lived for at least 20 years.

== Other media ==
=== Video games ===
- Math Antics with Disney's 101 Dalmatians (1996): a video game developed by Appaloosa Interactive, Disney Interactive and published by Sega on the Sega Pico.
- 101 Dalmatians: Activity Center (1996): Part of the Disney's Activity Center series of games released by Disney Interactive.
- 101 Dalmatians Print Studio (1997): Part of the Disney's Print Studio series of games released by Disney Interactive.
- Disney's Animated Storybook: 101 Dalmatians (1997): A point-and-click computer game released by Disney Interactive for Microsoft Windows and Apple Macintosh. The game retold the plot of the 1996 live action film through an animated storybook with interactive games, and songs.
- 101 Dalmatians: Escape from DeVil Manor (1997): A computer game created by Disney Interactive. The game was based on the 1996 live-action movie, although the character designs were based on the original animated film.
- Disney's 102 Dalmatians: Puppies to the Rescue (2000): A video game based on the live-action Disney film 102 Dalmatians, but with the art style based on the original animated 101 Dalmatians film. The game was developed by Toys for Bob for PlayStation, Dreamcast, and Microsoft Windows. A Game Boy Color version was also developed by Digital Eclipse.
- 102 Dalmatians Activity Center (2001): A part of the Disney's Activity Center series of games, released by Disney Interactive.
- Kingdom Hearts (2002): Pongo, Perdita, and their 99 Puppies are characters in the game. Pongo and Perdita live in a house in Traverse Town after their world was destroyed, their puppies being lost in different worlds, and the game's protagonist, Sora, having to find them in different locations.
- 101 Dalmatians II: Patch's London Adventure (2003): An action-adventure/platforming game based on the film of the same name. It was developed by Digital Eclipse Software, Inc. and published by Eidos Interactive for the Sony PlayStation. It was released on November 20, 2003 exclusively in North America.
- Disney Magic Kingdoms (2021): In a limited time event focused on 101 Dalmatians, Pongo, Perdita, Lucky, Patch, Rolly, Penny and Cruella were included as playable characters, along with some attractions based on locations of the film. In the game, the characters are involved in new storylines that serve as a continuation of the events in the 101 Dalmatians animated film (ignoring other material in the franchise).
- Disney Speedstorm (2024): Cruella De Vil was added as a playable racer during the game's ninth season as a mid-season bonus racer. A few other characters from the 1961 film are also in the game as crew members.

== Disney Parks and Resorts ==
One Hundred and One Dalmatians has a small presence at the Disney Parks and Resorts mainly through shops and occasional shows. Cruella is the only meetable character from the franchise and is usually located on Main Street, U.S.A.

Notably, Cruella makes an appearance in the Villains Unfairly Ever After show in Disney’s Hollywood Studios. As one of the three main villains, she showcases her “sympathetic” backstory to imply she was treated unfairly. Her segment mostly consists of explaining that sacrifices must be made for art and how her actions were simply her artistic vision.

== Recurring cast and characters ==
List indicators

This section includes characters who will appear or have appeared in more than two films in the series.

- An empty grey cell indicates the character was not in the film, or that the character's official presence has not yet been confirmed.
- ^{U} indicates an uncredited appearance.
- ^{V} indicates a voice-only role.
- ^{Y} indicates a younger version of the character.
- ^{S} indicates an appearance as a character's singing voice.
- ^{F} indicates the former voice of a character.

Characters	Animated films		Live-action films			Animated series			Video game
Characters	One Hundred and One Dalmatians	101 Dalmatians II: Patch's London Adventure	101 Dalmatians	102 Dalmatians	Cruella	101 Dalmatians: The Series		101 Dalmatian Street	102 Dalmatians: Puppies to the Rescue
Characters	One Hundred and One Dalmatians	101 Dalmatians II: Patch's London Adventure	101 Dalmatians	102 Dalmatians	Cruella	Season 1	Season 2	101 Dalmatian Street	102 Dalmatians: Puppies to the Rescue
Characters	1961	2003	1996	2000	2021	1997-98	1997-98	2019-20	2000
=== Animals ===
Pongo	Rod Taylor	Samuel West	Frank Welker^{V}^{U}		Uncredited Dalmatian	Kevin Schon	Kevin Schon	Photograph	
Perdita	Cate Bauer Lisa Daniels^{F}	Kath Soucie	Frank Welker^{V}^{U}		Uncredited Dalmatian	Pam Dawber	Pam Dawber	Photograph	
Lucky	Mimi Gibson	Ben Tibber	Frank Welker^{V}^{U}			Pamela Adlon Debi Mae West	Pamela Adlon Debi Mae West		
Rolly	Barbara Baird{	Eli Russell Linnetz				Kath Soucie	Kath Soucie		
Patch	Mickey Maga	Bobby Lockwood				Justin Shenkarow	Justin Shenkarow		
Sergeant Tibbs	David Frankham					Jeff Bennett	Jeff Bennett		Eddie Izzard
Colonel	J. Pat O'Malley		Uncredited Old English Sheepdog			Jim Cummings	Jim Cummings		
Thunderbolt	Silent role	Barry Bostwick				Frank Welker			
Dipstick			Uncredited Dalmatian	Uncredited Dalmatian		Thom Adcox-Hernandez	Thom Adcox-Hernandez		Jeff Bennett
Waddlesworth				Eric Idle					Eric Idle
=== Humans ===
Cruella de Vil	Betty Lou Gerson	Susanne Blakeslee	Glenn Close	Glenn Close	Emma Stone Tipper Seifert-Cleveland^{Y} Billie Gadsdon^{Y}	April Winchell	April Winchell	Michelle Gomez	Susanne Blakeslee
Jasper Badun	J. Pat O'Malley	Jeff Bennett	Hugh Laurie		Joel Fry Ziggy Gardner^{Y}	Michael McKean	Michael McKean		Jeff Bennett
Horace Badun	Frederick Worlock	Maurice LaMarche	Mark Williams		Paul Walter Hauser Joseph MacDonald^{Y}	David L. Lander	David L. Lander		Maurice LaMarche
Nanny	Martha Wentworth	Mary MacLeod	Joan Plowright			Charlotte Rae	Charlotte Rae		
Roger Radcliffe / Dearly	Ben Wright Bill Lee^{S}	Tim Bentinck	Jeff Daniels		Kayvan Novak	Jeff Bennett	Jeff Bennett		
Anita Radcliffe / Dearly	Lisa Davis	Jodi Benson	Joely Richardson		Kirby Howell-Baptiste Florisa Kamara^{Y}	Kath Soucie	Kath Soucie		
Alonzo			Tim McInnerny	Tim McInnerny					
Jean-Pierre LePelt				Gérard Depardieu					Jess Harnell

== Reception ==
=== Box office and financial performance ===
Film	Box office gross			Box office ranking		Worldwide video sales	Worldwide gross income	Budget	Ref.
Film	North America	Other territories	Worldwide	All time worldwide	North America	Worldwide video sales	Worldwide gross income	Budget	Ref.
One Hundred and One Dalmatians	$302,698,419	$301,581	$303,000,000	#365	#11,972	$88,120,888	$391,120,888	$3,300,000	
101 Dalmatians II: Patch's London Adventure	—N/a	—N/a	—N/a	—N/a	—N/a	Information not publicly available	Information not publicly available	Information not publicly available	
101 Dalmatians	$136,189,294	$168,010,706	$304,200,000	#447	#556	Information not publicly available	>$304,200,000	$75,000,000	
102 Dalmatians	$66,957,026	$116,654,745	$183,611,771	#1,239	#2,302	Information not publicly available	>$183,611,771	$85,000,000	
Cruella	$86,103,234	$142,914,031	$226,892,470	#729	#897	—N/a	$226,892,470	$100,000,000	

=== Critical and public response ===
Film	Rotten Tomatoes	Metacritic	CinemaScore
One Hundred and One Dalmatians	98% (52 reviews)	83/100 (10 reviews)	—N/a
101 Dalmatians II: Patch's London Adventure	67% (6 reviews)	—N/a	—N/a
101 Dalmatians	41% (37 reviews)	49/100 (20 reviews)	A
102 Dalmatians	31% (92 reviews)	35/100 (24 reviews)	B+
Cruella	74% (373 reviews)	60/100 (24 reviews)	A
