= Disney's Animated Storybook =

Interactive storybook video game series

- Series logo
- Genres: Point-and-click adventure, interactive storybook
- Developers: Media Station (most entries); Pixar (Disney's Animated Storybook: Toy Story); Creative Capers Entertainment (Ariel's Story Studio [with Media Station], Disney's Animated Storybook: Winnie the Pooh and Tigger Too); Revolution Software (Disney's Story Studio: Mulan for PlayStation)
- Publishers: Disney Interactive; NewKidCo (Mulan PS1 NTSC); Sony Computer Entertainment (Mulan PS1 PAL)
- Creator: Marc Teren
- Platforms: Windows, Macintosh, PlayStation
- First release: Disney's Animated Storybook: The Lion King; November 1994
- Latest release: Disney's Animated Storybook: Winnie the Pooh and Tigger Too; April 1999

Disney's Animated Storybook (stylized as Disney's Animated StoryBook, and also known as Disney's Story Studio) is a point-and-click adventure interactive storybook video game series based on Walt Disney Feature Animation and Pixar films that were released during the mid-to-late 1990s. They were published by Disney Interactive for personal computers (Microsoft Windows and Apple Macintosh) for children ages four to eight years old. Most of the entries in the series were developed by Media Station. The games take players through abridged and narrated retellings of their respective Disney films, allowing the player to click on hotspots to trigger animations or sound effects. Some of the games feature voice talent from the films reprising their roles.

During the late 1980s and early 1990s, Disney outsourced video game development via its Walt Disney Computer Software division. The Disney's Animated Storybook series was conceived following the success of Disney's 1994 animated film The Lion King, with Disney entering the edutainment software industry around that time. Development of Disney's Animated Storybook: The Lion King, one of Disney Software's first CD-based computer titles, was handled by Media Station, which only had five months to complete the title. The rush to meet a Christmas 1994 release resulted in a lack of testing, leading to widespread technical issues on consumer hardware and heavy customer complaints.

Following the commercial success of Disney's Animated Storybook: The Lion King, Disney Interactive was formed as an in-house game development studio that would handle the animation, design, and marketing of subsequent entries while Media Station handled the programming and development. The games were generally developed on tight budgets and schedules and alongside the films to ensure authenticity and efficiency. The games were heavily promoted and commercially successful, particularly The Lion King and Toy Story, which were the top selling children's titles in their respective years. Reviewers praised the games' animation, fidelity to the films, and appeal to young children, though later titles were criticized for their repetitiveness and simplicity.

== Titles ==
Title	Developer(s)	Release date	Based on
Disney's Animated Storybook: The Lion King	Disney Software (in association with Media Station)	November 18, 1994	The Lion King (1994)
Disney's Animated Storybook: Winnie the Pooh and the Honey Tree	Disney Interactive (in association with Media Station)	August 28, 1995	Winnie the Pooh and the Honey Tree (1966)
Disney's Animated Storybook: Pocahontas	Disney Interactive (in association with Animation Services at Walt Disney Feature Animation and Media Station)	December 1, 1995	Pocahontas (1995)
Disney's Animated Storybook: Toy Story	Disney Interactive and Pixar	April 24, 1996	Toy Story (1995)
Disney's Animated Storybook: The Hunchback of Notre Dame	Disney Interactive (in association with Media Station with special thanks to Animation Services at Walt Disney Feature Animation)	November 11, 1996	The Hunchback of Notre Dame (1996)
Disney's Animated Storybook: 101 Dalmatians	Disney Interactive (in association with Media Station)	March 18, 1997	One Hundred and One Dalmatians (1961)
Disney's Animated Storybook: Hercules	Disney Interactive (in association with Media Station with special thanks to Animation Services at Walt Disney Feature Animation)	July 25, 1997	Hercules (1997)
Ariel's Story Studio (a.k.a. Disney's Animated Storybook: The Little Mermaid)	Disney Interactive (in association with Media Station)	November 25, 1997	The Little Mermaid (1989)
Disney's Animated Storybook: Mulan (a.k.a. Disney's Story Studio: Mulan)	Disney Interactive (in association with Creative Capers Entertainment) (Windows and Macintosh); Developed by Kids Revolution and published by NewKidCo (PlayStation)	September 14, 1998 (PC); November 1999 (PlayStation)	Mulan (1998)
Disney's Animated Storybook: Winnie the Pooh and Tigger Too	Disney Interactive (in association with Creative Capers Entertainment)	April 30, 1999	Winnie the Pooh and Tigger Too (1974)

== Development ==
=== Background and Walt Disney Computer Software (1988–1994) ===
"'The processes that we were using were actually catching the attention of different divisional groups that all said 'Wait a minute.' They all kind of wanted to manage or have a say or control what was happening. And we were so relatively low on the totem pole that it became a bigger deal, that discussion that took place over our heads." Projects became almost impossible to get approved, according to Mullich, as pitch meetings took place in front of management teams, and after six months of continual 'no' replies, Mullich left.

— Roger Hector, director of product development for Disney Software from 1989 to 1993, quoted in Polygon.

Video games based on the Walt Disney Company's properties have been released since Mickey Mouse for Nintendo's Game & Watch in 1981. Disney licensed out its properties and established partnerships with developers and publishers such as Nintendo, Sega, Capcom, Square, and Sierra, who used the characters in games. The earliest of these resembled arcade-style "cause and effect" games that featured Disney characters. Later, licensors began to create more sophisticated adventure games that comprised different environments, interaction with characters, unlocking secrets, and overcoming obstacles. Instead of creating new narratives, the developers of these games based them on stories presented in other media; early examples include Winnie the Pooh in the Hundred Acre Wood (1985) and The Black Cauldron (1986). In the latter, designer Al Lowe had access to Disney's original musical score, hand-painted backgrounds, and animation cels, which allowed for more advanced graphics when compared to previous games. In 1988, Walt Disney Computer Software (WDCS), (Note: WDCS also used the trade names Disney Software and Buena Vista Software.) Disney's in-house game development studio, was founded so Disney could enter the software market. Because Disney did not want to handle the menial programming and expensive publishing of games on its own and instead wanted to collect profits from developers, WDSC only licensed properties to external developers. As such, it was placed in the company's Consumer Products arm for licensing agreements.

Over the next few years, Disney built a routine of releasing tie-in games shortly after film releases. They later became more involved in the development process; for example, for the Sega Genesis version of Aladdin (1993), Disney animators worked with the game designers. Roy Disney was unhappy with the quality of a third-party Fantasia game he was overseeing and shut down production; the greater involvement from Disney's feature animation team led to the games being better received by critics and the public. In 1991, low sales figures coupled with developers charging license fees and Disney shutting down low-quality games during development meant the company was to be turned into a joint partnership with outside software houses. In 1993, Disney chairman Michael Eisner publicly "defied interactive hype by portraying the company as low-tech". Disney executives discussed if they should "shift all game development in-house while tripling the number of people working in the division", or "in six weeks cut the whole team", but a final decision was reserved until 1994.

"A proven brand name does not necessarily translate into big sales. Disney preceded its run of hit titles like Winnie the Pooh Animated Storybook and The Lion King Activity Center with "unfocused attempts" based on traditional Disney characters. Then Disney Interactive began marketing software based on upcoming movies."

— Ed Thomas, software buyer at online retailer Cyberian Outpost, quoted in Computer Retail Week

Throughout the 1990s, popular children's stories in print were adapted into digital storybooks that encouraged interactive learning and play on the computer. Broderbund's Living Books series was perhaps the first example, or at least popularized the animated storybook format through games like Just Grandma and Me, and Arthur's Teacher Trouble, which were based on popular children's books from the 1980s by Mercer Mayer and Marc Brown, respectively. They combined the authors' illustrations and stories with digital activities and were guided by a narrator—each screen began with a brief animation followed by a narrator describing the action. After the conclusion of each page, the scene became an "interactive mural with hot buttons" the player could click. The Living Books became popular and encouraged other developers to follow suit and copy the formula. Disney Interactive was one of several interactive divisions of film studios sprouting at the time, including Universal Interactive Studios, Turner Interactive, Fox Interactive, Sony Imagesoft, and Imagination Pilots (MGM).

=== Series conception (June 1994) ===
Disney's 1994 animated film The Lion King won multiple awards and garnered financial success. Its merchandise sold well through the Disney Store and Disney's mail order catalog, and their product licensees had an increase in sales. The company began to cross-market the property throughout its Walt Disney Attractions, Buena Vista Television, Buena Vista Home Video, Walt Disney Records, and Disney Theatrical Productions divisions. Disney wanted to "add to the Lion King synergy of book, products, video, theme park units and recording sales" by making an animated storybook available by the 1994 Christmas shopping season. A new product line was announced on June 24, 1994, while The Lion King was being privately screened. The announcement included Disney Software's first two CD-ROM based computer games: The Lion King Animated Storybook and Aladdin Activity Center, the latter of which focused on games and learning activities rather than stories. Disney chose Media Station as its third-party developer for the game; due to the announcement, Media Station only had five months of development time. The Lion King Animated Storybook more closely followed the narrative and art style of the film it was based on than Aladdin Activity Center, released November 1994, did to Aladdin. For The Lion King Animated Storybook, the written text of the game is excerpted from Disney Publishing Group's The Lion King storybook, which reproduces the film's narrative in a truncated version. Disney spent over $3 million on promotion for the animated storybook game, and released the first version of The Lion King Animated Storybook on November 18, 1994, and its success prompted the company to turn WDCS into a full game developer, renamed Disney Interactive, with a line of animated storybooks to follow entitled Disney's Animated Storybook. The Lion King Animated Storybook was later accompanied by a CD-ROM, The Lion King Activity Center, in 1995, which started a trend that continued throughout the series. Pixar developed both Toy Story Animated Storybook and Toy Story Activity Center simultaneously in 1996, while the Winnie the Pooh in the Honey Tree Animated Storybook would be met with a companion, Winnie the Pooh Activity Center, in 2000. The Lion King Animated Storybook became Disney Interactive's second release on the Macintosh after the Aladdin Activity Center.

Media Station employee Newton Lee became one of the lead software and title engineers for The Lion King Animated Storybook. As he recalled in the book Disney Stories: Getting to Digital, "Media Station used a number of 'proprietary strategic software technologies' that made it easier for the developer to create large animation multimedia and the user to play it back, impossible until that time". A playback engine was created to provide high quality playback from a CD-ROM of large animations. WinToon, which Media Station previously developed for Microsoft, aided the projects by "reduc[ing] the amount of data actually required for larger animation playback". The software improved performance of playback in Windows by reducing the amount of data that was required", arguing that it was necessary because "unlike other interactive storybook developers who used a palette of 256 colors throughout the entire title, Media Station used 256 colors per screen; this resulted in very large animation files". In 1994, Lee created an object-oriented scripting language similar to Macromedia's ActionScript that allowed developers to create interactivity for animation quickly and easily, and a cross-platform multimedia compiler to allow the software to run on both Mac and Windows. Media Station also used a cross-platform language, Interactive Media File Script, Title Compiler, and Asset Management Systems, which allowed production for a Disney's Animated Storybook game to be between three and six months.

=== Release of The Lion King storybook (November 1994) ===
A "page" from Disney's Animated Storybook: The Lion King, showing the scene of Mufasa taking Simba on a walk through the Pride Lands and meeting with Zazu. The sidebars on the left and right has various characters from the film appear to serve as options; Zazu triggers the narration (provided by James Avery) to repeat, Simba and Nala take users to a minigame, Rafiki highlights certain words to provide simple definitions to young readers, and Timon takes users back to the main menu. The arrow signs take users to the next or previous "pages".

The Lion King Animated Storybook was originally released for Windows in December 1994, with a Mac version following in early 1995. The release of the computer game was affected by bad publicity; many customers found that the game ran poorly, if at all, on their computers; dozens of messages appeared in Disney's public bulletin board on America Online. Families became especially disgruntled because Disney's technical support team were unavailable. On the morning of December 25, Disney's customer service was flooded with calls. Complainants said that when they tried to load the game on their Compaq Presario computers, they received the blue screen of death. Eight employees were added to the Disney's phone-answering staff on December 26, 1994, to take questions from buyers. For weeks they were flooded with complaints about the title, as was Disney's CompuServe address. The company was accused of "killing Christmas" for thousands of children that year.

Disney was mostly silent but sometimes sent private replies to individual addresses. When the company made a statement, it accused Media Station of saying they had finished developing the product before it was fine-tuned; they also blamed customers for having inadequate computers for running the product and not reading the box carefully enough before buying. The Lion King Animated Storybook's minimum requirements include a 486SX MHz, MS-DOS 6.0, Windows 3.1, 4MB of RAM, 10MB of free disk space, a Windows-compatible mouse, a 256-color SVGA, and an 8 or 16-bit sound and 2xCD ROM drive, all of which were top of the range at the time. The game also relied on Window's new WinG graphics engine and could only work with select video drivers. In late 1994, Compaq released a Presario PC whose video drivers had not been tested with WinG, and due to the rush to market before Christmas 1994, the Animated Storybook was not tested for the computer. Lee asserted that the ultimate blame lay with the rush to market and lack of compatibility testing. Steve Fields, senior vice president of multimedia for Disney Interactive, blamed Disney for "timing the sales of the product so close to Christmas", and attributed its problems to the "high number of sales, more than half of which...made by new computer users who tried to learn how to use computers on Christmas Day with the Lion King animated storybook". He promised future games would be ready before Christmas and not rushed out. Fields said the problem was everywhere but Disney got a disproportionate amount of blame due to the high number of units sold. Phil Corman, vice president of the Interactive Multimedia Association, who in the aftermath created the Parallax Project to develop uniform package labelling and guidelines for developers, said that "[they're] not singling out Disney by any means, but that was just the watershed event." In The Wall Street Journal article "A jungle out there", Rose and Turner argued that "Disney had had final responsibility for quality control of the animated storybook" and that they "apparently did not exercise the responsibility". David Gregory of Media Station asserted that 90 percent of the complaint cases were due to the video driver used; Media Station resolved the video driver card issue within days, and made a second version available for purchase and as a free exchange for the earlier one. The company recalled defective programs, and "many users have supposedly been provided a video driver upgrade by Disney". In a June 1995 press release, the company noted they were providing "technical support, full refunds or product exchanges if the customer is not completely satisfied". By May 1995, families could call Disney Interactive customer support and request a free version 1.1 CD, which incorporated support for 8-bit sound boards. In 1995, a third version of the software, compatible with both Windows and MS-DOS, was released. The Lion King incident led Microsoft to develop DirectX in September 1995.

Despite the game being highly promoted and successful, negative news stories appeared on TV. The game likely worked on the systems Disney programmers used to test the game, but not on the systems used by the general public. It was used as a case study in relation to programmers having "target environment and intended end user" in mind. Lecturer Audrey Ricker felt this would "force businesses to be more publicly responsive to consumers". Entertainment Weekly called it a "humiliating fiasco" where "thousands of frustrated parents swamp[ed] tech-support lines with woeful tales of non-functioning sound cards and video freeze-ups". Ricker asserted the event demonstrated that a piece of software must be thoroughly tested on all supported platforms and system configurations before its release, regardless of what the marketing department has scheduled or what major holidays are coming up. 7th Level contacted Disney about developing a game for Christmas 1995 featuring Timon and Pumbaa in response to the misstep. George D. Grayson, 7th Level's president and chief executive, said "the computer nerd takes particular pleasure in making something work that doesn't work right". The game was Timon & Pumbaa's Jungle Games, Disney Interactive's first entry into their entertainment-focused Disney Interactive Entertainment division.

The Lion King Animated Storybook was also available in Spanish, French, German and Italian through a special mail-in offer on the English product. In November 1995, six local language versions were released in Europe. In February 1996, following the success of the first three titles in the series, Disney Interactive planned to develop 23 new foreign-language versions of the games. In June 1996, Disney announced a Japanese version of The Lion King Animated Storybook to tap into the country's growing PC home market. Michael Jardine, representative director of Disney Interactive Japan, said that while there were no sales targets, the company would be happy to sell a copy for each of the country's 7.5 million computers. Libro Animado Interactivo: Winnie Puh was released in April 1997, and from July 20 onwards a bilingual version of the game was available on the Disney website. Disney Interactive Japan released 101 Dalmatians Animated Storybook in June 1997, with The Hunchback of Notre Dame Animated Storybook following in late 1997 or early 1998. A Spanish version of Winnie the Pooh and Tigger Too Animated Storybook was released in mid-1999. In July 2001, Disney Interactive officially announced they would be launching Spanish versions of many of its titles in the U.S. and Puerto Rico in an effort to penetrate the Hispanic market; the games would begin sale that November in traditional retail, Hispanic shops, and through Hispanic exclusive distributors. Called Libro Animado Interactivo, these included El Rey León (The Lion King), Pocahontas, Winnie Puh y el Árbol De La Miel (Winnie the Pooh and the Honey Tree), 101 Dálmatas (101 Dalmatians), Hercules, and La Sirenita (The Little Mermaid). This was the first time Disney made Spanish versions of its edutainment titles, after dubbing films into Spanish and other languages, and one of the first few times any computer software company had made an effort to target the U.S. Hispanic population. Disney Interactive president Jan Smith expressed joy with Disney Interactive offering "Hispanic parents and kids the chance to experience interactive entertainment within the context of their own culture." Disney Interactive collaborated with Latin Links. the exclusive sales representative of the company's Spanish-language products within the U.S. and Puerto Rico. Isabel Valdés, head of multicultural marketing firm Santiago Valdés Consulting noted: "This initiative bridges a gap between Hispanic parents and children, who can preserve their native language while experiencing the entertainment value of Disney in a whole new way." A German version of Mulan Animated Storybook was released in 1998.

=== Disney Interactive founding (December 1994) ===
"[At Disney Interactive], there was not a deep bench of people who were experienced in interactive storytelling at any level, because all games prior to that, at that point in time, were primarily driven through the minds and eyes of a very small team that was programming and engineering-driven."

— Marc Teren, quoted in Polygon.

As a result of The Lion King Animated Storybook and Aladdin Activity Center being successful, Disney Interactive was founded December 5, 1994, by merging WDCS with the Walt Disney Television and Telecommunications (WDTT) division, to develop and market a range of interactive entertainment based on their properties. WDTT chairman Richard Frank expected Disney Interactive to become a $1 billion business within five years, with 20 interactive games and educational titles in 1995, another 40 titles in 1996, and up to 60 in 1997; development for these was to range from more than $100,000 to $1 million. The new Disney Interactive division was devoted to developing, publishing, and licensing software for children's entertainment and educational markets. It started with two sub-divisions: Disney Interactive Entertainment (for action-oriented console games in the entertainment arena) and Disney Interactive Edutainment (curriculum-based and interactive family software, particularly in the edutainment and education product markets). Disney Interactive Edutainment was Disney Interactive's main product line, under which the Disney's Animated Storybook series fell. All development moved in-house, and the division grew to between 80 and 120 employees from the eight or so the division had three years earlier. The new unit had Steve McBeth as a new president, an increased staff, more interaction with other divisions of the company, and a greater financial commitment from Disney. Its first projects were Pocahontas Animated Storybook and a software title based on Disney's Gargoyles TV show. With the new division, Disney executives were supportive of creative risks, and the studio was generally left unsupervised rather than being under "constant or undue scrutiny". McBeth was committed to "producers and directors of animated features [being] involved in [the] creative development process for CD-ROMs and video games". He noted that "Disney realizes that production is becoming an increasingly multifaceted process" and that "when creating an animated film or home video, the company also must have plans to spin off a variety of software products". The new division moved from solely licensing Disney properties or publishing titles to handling game development and publishing. Although outside contractors like Media Station were still used after the restructure, Rose and Turner asserted in The Washington Post that "they will probably be dropped if the Disney Interactive division becomes the full-service software unit that Disney seemingly intends". While Media Station and other companies continued to help develop the Disney edutainment products, including the Disney's Animated Storybook line, they could not continue a long-term relationship with Disney Interactive as it was now "subject to the whim of Disney".

Disney Interactive planned for the new series of educational video games to feature popular characters and allow players to follow the stories while learning; it named the franchise Disney's Animated Storybook, subtitled "A Story Waiting For You To Make It Happen". Marc Teren, vice president of Disney Interactive's entertainment division, hoped to create games with a "true and fair representation of the original property", while aiming to capitalize on "ancillary products to successful theatrical and home video releases". Children's Business suggested the series came into fruition because in the contemporary entertainment market, it was "customary now for entertainment companies to release CD-ROMs to support a film or TV show". According to writer Rena B. Lewis, the games were "designed for use at home, not school". The animated books were considered a type of entertainment program, one of the three types released by Disney Interactive in addition to their simulation games and discovery programs. While they were advertised as teaching tools because they give no reward to players for doing this like they do for clicking hotspots, "the teaching of reading could be considered secondary in these programs". As edutainment, these games "could be said to teach the process of and rehearse reflexes needed for playing video games".

The film stories were edited to ensure continuity of the original narrative while offering interaction and voice acting was provided. They allowed children to choose what they wanted to do onscreen. The original film scripts were considered from an activity standpoint, with clickable features added to each page so players could affect the story; for example, in The Lion King Animated Storybook, players could turn Pride Rock from green to brown, or collect bugs for Timon to eat. These techniques increased engagement with each screen's events, and helped create connections between the player and characters.

=== Media Station era (1994–1996) ===
The Lion King was the first film to be given an "interactive story life" and Disney's first venture into the storybook realm. Media Station was the main developer of the series. While Disney Interactive planned to bring software development in-house to the studio, the business model for the Disney's Animated Storybook series had Disney Interactive outsource the development work to Media Station, while handling the animation and design themselves at their Burbank head office, which left Disney in charge of the design, development, and marketing of the series, with Media Station and other companies acting as programming contractors without creative decision making. The series' distribution was handled by Buena Vista Pictures Distribution. The developers aimed to have a "true and fair representation of the original property", and had the films' directors and producers working alongside their artists and designers. Disney and Media Station co-designed the titles as a joint venture. Speaking about Media Station's work with other studios, Gregory said, "Working with Disney has given us the chance to work with the greatest content possible, and the challenge of living up to their standards. It's gotten our name in the channels". Media Station handled development for much of the series, as Disney Interactive did not yet have the technical resources to handle it themselves. In May 1996, Disney Interactive acquired Sanctuary Studios, which continued to operate as an independent developer of educational content under Disney. Sanctuary's 35 staff in their local Victoria, British Columbia, office became a small part of Disney Interactive's 300 employees, and handled the programming, sound and graphic design, and art instead of Media Station. Some background art and animation was also outsourced to Creative Capers Entertainment for these titles.

Teren oversaw development of the entire series, and directed Disney's early production of animated storybooks and activity center software. Beginning with The Lion King Animated Storybook, instead of reusing artwork from the film and forcing it into the new format, Teren's team "worked hand in hand with the group in feature animation", while the film's directors and producers worked with the games' designers and artists. Disney and Media Station created more than 12,000 frames of digital animation together for each game. For The Lion King Animated Storybook, Media Station contributed 7,000 new frames of animation while Disney animators contributed 5,000. Media Station also created over 300 music and vocal assets, using traditional orchestration and arrangement and digital composition tools. Digital music and sound effects were composed, recorded, and edited at Media Station; Gregory wrote the score for The Lion King Animated Storybook.

One of the advantages of creating software while the films were in production was that it allowed the original voice cast to be part of the projects. The voice cast sometimes consisted of actors from the films reprising their roles; for instance, Toy Story Animated Storybook featured Don Rickles as Mr. Potato Head, Annie Potts as Bo Peep, and Jim Varney as Slinky Dog. Kevin Kline, Demi Moore, Jason Alexander, and Tom Hulce reprised their roles in The Hunchback of Notre Dame Animated Storybook. For Pocahontas Animated Storybook, the developers hired Chris Webber and Irene Bedard. In The Little Mermaid, Jodi Benson and Samuel E. Wright reprised their roles as Ariel and Sebastian, respectively. At other times, different voice actors who sounded like the originals were used, such as Tom Hanks' brother Jim Hanks voicing Woody in the Toy Story game. The Lion King Animated Storybook is narrated by The Fresh Prince of Bel-Air actor James Avery, while Toy Story Animated Storybook is narrated by Cheers actor John Ratzenberger, who played Hamm in the film.

The games were generally created on tight budgets and schedules. Disney found that "planning or making software while movies are filmed helps the product stay true to the film, and makes it cheaper to produce". Disney Interactive planned to develop the software alongside the films' creative teams, and have it released simultaneously with the films, which allowed The Lion King's animated storybook to be developed quickly and released soon after the film. Lee asserted that its "quick release was in part responsible for its success in the marketplace". The company found that software released a bit after the film could also boost sales, noting The Lion King Animated Storybook's strong sales a year after release. The Lion King Animated Storybook was released "an astonishingly short six months after the movie's release, just prior to Christmas". Winnie the Pooh and the Honey Tree Animated Storybook was originally expected to be released in April 1995, but was delayed for several months. While The Hunchback of Notre Dame Animated Storybook was originally scheduled for release in September 1996 (four months after its announcement and three months after the release of the film), it was delayed until November. 101 Dalmatians Animated Storybook was intended to be released in November 1996 to coincide with the release of the live-action remake film's theatrical release, but was either released three days later or postponed to March 1997. The San Francisco Chronicle observed that the game's story concludes rapidly, noting that "the disc's developers probably had a deadline to meet". Both the Storybook and Print Studio Hercules games were released out in under a month after the theatrical version; Hercules came out simultaneously with the film's release. The success of previous titles in the series like Toy Story led to The Hercules Action Game, Animated Storybook, and Print Studio being rushed out in October to preempt the Christmas season. Toy Story made its debut before the film's video version was released. The Los Angeles Times noted the timing of Ariel's Story Studio coincided with the rerelease of The Little Mermaid. Winnie The Pooh and Tigger Too Animated Storybook was also "rushed out", according to Birmingham Evening Mail, due to its release schedule being brought forward: it was originally scheduled for February 1999, but was postponed a few months.

From December 1994 to February 1995, Disney Interactive hired 50 new employees. It felt the initial success of the Activity and Storybook games would boost the success of their Disney's Learning Series (starting with Ready to Read with Pooh) and the first game from their creativity line, Disney's Draw & Paint. Due to the success of The Lion King Animated Storybook, Media Station received contracts from other companies such as Hasbro, Mattel, Scholastic, Crayola, IBM, and HarperCollins. The success of the first Activity Center and Animated Storybook titles resulted in other developers attempting to mimic Disney with their own digital storybooks, such as Sound Source Interactive's Babe: A Little Pig Goes a Long Way - Interactive MovieBook and Viacom New Media's The Indian in the Cupboard, both released in 1995. The second title in the series was Winnie the Pooh and the Honey Tree Animated Storybook, which was aimed at a younger audience by using a popular character to introduce young players to the interactive medium through a linear story with interactive elements, following in the footsteps of the first rudimentary interactive children's story, Amanda Goodenough's Inigo Gets Out for the HyperCard, released eight years prior. During development of Winnie the Pooh and the Honey Tree Animated Storybook, Media Station suffered low employee morale and several key engineers threatened to quit. With Lee uplifting employee morale, the team was able to finish the project on schedule. By 1996, the Disney Interactive's education division had 125 staff, and was "spending enormous amounts of money to make sure there is a unique experience". The Animated Storybooks for Pocahontas, Hunchback and Hercules gave "special thanks" or "in associated with" credits to Animation Services at Walt Disney Feature Animation. In 1996, Ricker asserted that "[b]y taking control of its interactive business and competing with Broderbund and other giants in the field, Disney will most likely strengthen its position as one of the five major studios".

=== Pixar's Interactive Products Group (1996) ===
Development of Toy Story Animated Storybook was handled by Pixar instead of an outsourced developer. While most of the storybooks feature a traditional animation style, Toy Story uses CGI graphics to simulate the film's visuals. 80 percent of the artwork Pixar created for the game was new.

The Interactive Products Group (also known as the Pixar Interactive Division), a Pixar subsidiary, was founded in 1996. Its staff included 95 of Pixar's 300 and was headed by Pam Kerwin. It was founded to create computer games and had its own animators, art department, and engineers. The group was tasked with creating two products amid intense time constraints to coincide with the VHS release of the Toy Story film: Toy Story Animated Storybook (released April 1996) and Toy Story Activity Center (released October 1996); the division produced them within 16 months. As vice president of the Interactive Products Group from 1996 to 1998, Kerwin spearheaded development of interactive edutainment products based on Pixar's feature film properties. Disney's Animated Storybook: Toy Story was touted as "the first CD-ROM to deliver full screen, motion-picture-quality animation on home computers". Between the two products, the group had created as much original animation as there was in the Toy Story film itself.

Children's interactive product writer and designer Carolyn Handler Miller wrote the script and text for the game. As the team could not get Tom Hanks to narrate, Miller was forced to tell the story from the point of view of another character, settling on the "highly entertaining, sardonic" character Hamm. Hanks was replaced by his brother Jim, while Pat Fraley replaced Tim Allen as Buzz. Miller had to rewrite the story from his perspective—a significant change from the film—creating a writing challenge. The team also struggled to "incorporate meaningful interaction" that would be in the best interests of the game's quality. For instance, in the film some characters are seen playing checkers, so members of the team wanted to add the game as a minigame, but it was eventually decided that the minigame did not advance the narrative or involve the story's characters, instead "stopping everything dead". Instead, Miller designed a minigame with a time limit before Andy and his guests came into the room and made the "alarming discovery" that toys come to life when humans are not around; she said the minigame gave the players a sense of urgency and agency. According to The Guardian, the game was published by Avanquest, a French software house known for releasing antivirus software, though Wired wrote it was released via Disney Interactive. The Seattle Times noted that for Toy Story Animated Storybook, "Faced with home computers' modest processing power, Disney's programmers had to limit the number of objects moving onscreen".

While Steve Jobs was convinced the games would sell 10 million copies, on par with the sales figures of bestselling direct-to-video releases, Kerwin thought the games would not be as financially successful as the film because the gaming market had not reached that scale and the audience for tie-ins was limited. Together Storybook and Activity sold one million copies and contributed to Pixar possessing $150 million by the second quarter of 1996. CEO Lawrence Levy and entertainment analyst Harold Vogel described the games as successful. However, the storybook failed to meet Pixar's expectations, and "overall market for CD-ROM based interactive entertainment [had] not matured as many had hoped and predicted". At the time, Pixar wanted to continue work on the then-made-for-home video Toy Story 2, but the entire studio only had 300 people: around 200 were working on A Bug's Life, and 62 were developing games at the Interactive Products Group. Disney became unhappy with the slow progress of Toy Story 2, which was still in development. Pixar needed artists to work on the films, so it borrowed them from the in-house division Interactive Products Group, thinking, "Why are we doing this? Let's just make the movies. That's where our passion is." When Jobs was informed that the games would not meet sales expectations, he shut down the computer games operation and redirected the division's talent and resources to Pixar's main filmmaking division; the staff became the initial core of the Toy Story 2, which about to enter into production after a year of gestation, while leaving any future CD-ROM efforts to Disney Interactive due to their marketing and merchandising prowess. The dissolution of the division was preempted by the closure of Pixar's television-commercial unit in July 1996 so the team could focus solely on films.

Jobs said that while Pixar staff enjoyed creating the titles, the studio chose to focus talent on films produced under its partnership with Disney, as that was "where [their] greatest opportunities [lay]". The computer games operation dissolved on March 31, 1997, and no further games were made, while Kerwin was assigned to start a shortfilm group. Their first project, Geri's Game, was released alongside A Bug's Life and started a trend of shorts being paired with films. Robertson Stephens analyst Keith Benjamin felt it "[made] no sense for Pixar to waste their scarce talent on CD-ROMs now that they have a better deal with Disney. They're going to concentrate on films because that's where the real money is". Pixar co-founder Ed Catmull told Variety in 1999, that "[they] did the very best and only did fine financially" on the games, noting that the company spent as much on them as they did on films. When asked in 2012 if Pixar would return to the gaming industry, Brave director Mark Andrews firmly said "no" based on his experience at the Interactive Products Group, while the film's producer, Katherine Sarafian, said, "I don't think we would consider it now because we want to focus on the primary business of filmmaking".

=== Creative Capers era (1996–1999) ===
In 1996, Media Station production ceased, and Lee joined Disney Online, where he designed games for Disney's online subscription product. Its last product to be released was Hercules. Throughout 1997, Living Books' sales dropped while costs increased, facing growing competition from Disney Interactive and Microsoft in the animated storybook genre; as a result, its staff was laid off and the group was folded into Broderbund. Disney also faced financial challenges, with titles that would have cost $1 or 2 million reaching $5–8 million. Amidst other financial challenges, the company found that the success of games such as the Toy Story storybook lacked the flow-on in products such as 7th Level's The Hunchback of Notre Dame: Topsy Turvy Games. Teren left the company, 25 percent of its staff was laid off, and the studio moved back to a licensing model within the Consumer Products division. At the time, while all console products were licensed, Disney mostly self-published PC titles, and educational games were still developed in-house. Disney Interactive refocused on its core business of providing interactive CD-ROMs for 3- to 12-year-old children and concentrated on leveraging film properties into multimedia products. After Media Station's departure, the later titles in the Animated Storybook series were developed by Creative Capers Entertainment, which entered into an exclusive development deal with Disney in 1996. They had previously provided animation work to Media Station's 101 Dalmatians Animated Storybook and offered animation, design, and art services for such Disney Interactive game titles as Gamebreak! Timon & Pumbaa's Jungle Games, Gargoyles, and Mickey Mania; this multi-year deal meant that Disney Interactive also had the rights to any new Creative Capers projects. As a result, Creative Capers, which had also done work for films such as Tom and Jerry: The Movie, The Pagemaster and Thumbelina, was in charge of Disney Interactive's animation production and product development.

Throughout the first five months of 1997, Disney held 12 percent of the retail educational software market while The Learning Company held 18 percent; The Wall Street Journal asserted the success of Disney's games such as the 101 Dalmatians storybook had put financial pressure on its rival.

Creative Capers had provided background art and animation for earlier entries, and took over development for later titles. Coming from a film background, the company had to adjust their animation style for the projects as animations in the storybooks were displayed at around ten frames per second, much lower than feature films. Creative Capers president Sue Shakespeare noted that "in games and Animated Storybooks, there's a purpose for every scene and you have to communicate that quickly using half or even a tenth the number of the frames. In Disney's Animated Storybook, the purpose is to deliver the look and feel and the story of the movie with just a tiny percentage of the animation you would have in a film." Shakespeare enforced a rule requiring employees to avoid animating more than a third of the screen at once to prevent the game engine from overextending and causing jerky movement. She also noted the games would be played on computers of varying qualities, and that they had to acknowledge these restrictions during design. The goal was to create feature animation quality, but "at the CD-ROM level". Denver Post noted that as the games were conceived from inside Disney, "developers seem to have unparalleled access to film content while the game moves through development".

In November 1997, Disney Interactive released Ariel's Story Studio, the first in a "Story Studio" product line, where players could follow along with The Little Mermaid's storybook, or write, design and print their own. It was followed by a game called both Mulan Story Studio and Mulan Animated Storybook. In 1997, Disney rereleased The Little Mermaid as "counter-programming" to Fox's animated film Anastasia, which was set for release around the same time. The two studios were "scrambling to mine every potential dollar from their investment and make sure neither outdoes the other", so they competed in the video gaming space, with Ariel's Story Studio competing against Anastasia: Adventures with Pooka and Bartok. Joseph Adney, Disney Interactive's marketing director, said, "What we're trying to do is go way beyond the movie by providing for the child to direct it". According to Teacher Librarian, the game was produced by Disney Educational Productions, and was a part of their Disney Edu-Station website. The game was included in Disney's Classic Animated Storybook Collection and four other games in the series. Chicago Tribune reviewed Anastasia and Ariel side by side.

Toward the late 1990s, other companies began to follow Disney's storybook series strategy. Sound Source Interactive's An American Tail Animated Moviebook was timed for the rerelease of Universal Studios Home Video's first two Tail films and An American Tail III. In 1998, Disney signed a deal with Apple, which meant Winnie the Pooh and the Honey Tree would be sold for the iMac. On November 3, 1999, Business Wire revealed that Mulan was the first title to be released as the result of license agreements between Disney and NewKidCo International. In September 1999, Disney Interactive announced it was launching the three brand names "Disney's Early Learning," "Disney's Creativity" and "Disney's Games" and repricing 14 titles, including Disney's Animated Storybook Mulan from $29.99 to $19.99. In the multiyear multimillion-dollar deal, NewKidCo. was contracted to develop a series of games for the Sony PlayStation, Nintendo N64 and Game Boy Color platforms, with the first to be a port of Mulan Animated Storybook, to be released some time in 2000, but brought forward to November 1999. In late December, the game was released for GBC and was dual-compatible with Game Boy. In 2001, a compilation of three CDs titled Disney's Classic Animated StoryBook Collection was released consisting of Winnie the Pooh and Tigger Too, 101 Dalmatians, and Toy Story. A second volume was also released in 2001, featuring Winnie the Pooh and Tigger Too, The Lion King, Ariel, and Mulan. Graham Hopper, who became executive vice president/general manager of Disney Interactive Studios in 2002, closed down the last of Disney's PC studios that year, explaining, "It wasn't obvious that we could make money, given the continually lower and lower prices of children's PC titles". Animated storybooks continued to be popular until the World Wide Web evolved enough to allow different story experiences to take place on the new interactive medium. In 2011, Disney returned to the animated storybook genre when Disney Publishing Worldwide released a series of apps for Android, the first one being entitled Winnie the Pooh: What's a Bear to Do.

== Design ==
=== Gameplay ===
"Children can choose to see the sequences of the plot without any intervention or play the different pages that constitute the computer version of the story. On both sides of the screen, some characters offer additional possibilities or games or explanations of more difficult terms.

— Super PC

Players are encouraged to engage with the titles via interactive story-telling, discovery, and skill-building activities intended to provide fun yet educational experiences. The games use a point-and-click interface. The method of going from page to page is often creative and unique to the storybook; for example, in Disney's Animated Storybook: 101 Dalmatians, there are a series of inked feet leading to the exit (a reference to when the dogs roll in soot to evade Cruella De Vil). The games offer abridged retellings of their respective films, with various plot elements of the film changed. Containing in-game narration, the games allow players to read and play along with the story, or just have the narrator read the story to them. When playing along with the story, players can click on various hotspots to trigger animations or sound effects. Additionally, some "pages" of the story feature optional minigames.

Some of the voice cast from the films reprised their roles for the games. In 101 Dalmatians, to appeal to 1990s audiences, technology was updated or added, including computers, video game consoles, larger screen television sets, and passcode-enabled security gates. This game also features a soundtrack of karaoke sing-along songs, which includes five new songs and a new recording of the original film's song "Cruella De Vil".

Ariel's Story Studio also has a "Create Your Own Storybook" feature that allows players to devise their own storybooks and print out the finished product. Mulan contains more gameplay than other titles within the series; players look for scrolls across locations such as Mulan's house, the army camp, Tung Shao Pass, and the Imperial City. After the player finds all five scrolls and gives them to the emperor, they are made an official Imperial Storymaker, and given the ability to create original scrolls—their own animated storybooks. The roleplay within minigames allows players to interact with scenes from the films. In Hercules, the story is narrated in rhyming text, and allowed players to sing along to karaoke versions of songs from the film. The games provide players with art, poetry, and literature to teach sequencing, vocabulary skills, creative writing and auditory discrimination, to sing along with Disney tunes, practice memorization, learn music appreciation, focus on literacy skills such as vocabulary and reading comprehension, and create artwork on desktop publishing software; additionally the series is "designed to enhance supplemental learning in the classroom, and to give young children practice with early childhood motor skills and language arts".

=== Plot ===
"The animated story book, emulates an actual book but allows interactivity by the user with various objects on a page. The text can either be read to the user by a recorded voice as the words are highlighted, or read by the user. A click on an interactive 'hot spot' allowing user interface usually produces animation of some kind with accompanying sound.".

— The Lion King animated storybook: A case study of aesthetic and economic power

All the games' plots are abridged retellings of the animated films they are based on, with some plot elements changed or removed from their original counterparts.

Disney's Animated Storybook: The Lion King is based on the 1994 film.

Winnie the Pooh and the Honey Tree is based on the 1966 short film of the same name, and the game was the first of two Animated Storybook titles based on films included in 1977's The Many Adventures of Winnie the Pooh.

Pocahontas is based on the 1995 Walt Disney Animation Studios film of the same name, which told a fictionalised account of the relationship between Native American Pocahontas and Englishman John Smith in the midst of the European colonization of the Americas. Like in the film, the animated storybook video game follows Pocahontas and her friends Flit the hummingbird and Meeko the raccoon aim to prevent a war between British settlers and her Native American people. The game is narrated by Grandmother Willow, and features four activities.

Toy Story is based on the 1995 film of the same name. Developed by a computer game development subsidiary of Pixar that existed at the time, it is the only Animated Storybook title to be based on a Pixar (and, by extension, fully computer-animated) film.

The Hunchback of Notre Dame is based on the 1996 Walt Disney Animation Studios film of the same name, featuring the adventure of Quasimodo and his escape from Claude Frollo, and is part of the product line within Disney's The Hunchback of Notre Dame franchise. The game follows the plot of the 1996 Disney film The Hunchback of Notre Dame closely, and features six separate activities that can be played throughout the story, which is narrated by the fictional entertainer Clopin Trouillefou. The game contains the characters featured in Victor Hugo's original novel such as Quasimodo, Esmeralda and Phoebus, as well as characters created specifically for the Disney film such as the gargoyles Hugo, Victor and Laverne.

101 Dalmatians is based on the 1961 film of the same name and its 1996 live-action remake. The game is the only non-Winnie the Pooh-based Animated Storybook title based on a Walt Disney Animation Studios film that was made before the Disney Renaissance.

Hercules is based on the 1997 Walt Disney Animation Studios film of the same name.

Ariel's Story Studio was released as a tie-in to the 1997 re-release of The Little Mermaid. Despite sharing the same style of gameplay and the same primary developer in Media Station, the game has never been released under the Disney's Animated Storybook name, although it is generally considered to be the eighth entry in the series. The game is sometimes known as Disney's Animated Storybook: The Little Mermaid as a result.

Mulan is based on the 1998 film of the same name, and was developed by Media Station and published by Disney Interactive. A PlayStation port entitled Disney's Story Studio: Mulan was developed by Revolution Software (under the name Kids Revolution), and published by NewKidCo on December 20, 1999. This game was targeted toward a young female demographic ages four to nine.

Winnie the Pooh and Tigger Too is based on the 1974 short film of the same name. According to The Washington Times, the game is a loose adaptation of The House at Pooh Corner chapters, "In Which Tigger Is Unbounced" and "In Which It Is Shown That Tiggers Don't Climb Trees".

== Release ==
=== Promotion ===
Debra Streicker-Fine, head of the marketing department for Disney Software, worked on the titles' releases. The games had a variety of distribution methods, such as through retail outlets, mass merchants, software and specialty stores, and mail order catalogs. In the first year of the series' history, advertising creative for Disney Interactive's Edutainment unit (under which the Animated Storybooks lay) was completed by Kresser Stein Robaire in Santa Monica, but on September 26, 1995, the contract was awarded to Foote, Cone & Belding in San Francisco; their first assignment was the campaign for Pocahontas Animated Storybook. Meanwhile, the media portion of the account remained at Western International Media in Los Angeles.

While Disney was new to the software industry, the company was used to putting large promotional campaigns behind its products. The marketing push behind The Lion King Animated Storybook included being "advertising in computer magazines and on television, sweatshirt and plush toy giveaways at select retailers, a sweepstakes offering a trip to Walt Disney World and a free 'Lion King' mouse pad in every package". Joseph E. Adney III, marketing manager at Walt Disney Computer Software, noted that in their strategy "in-store, we looked for ways to support the retailers, make things more fun and add more value to the experience we are talking about". Disney Interactive presented information on their upcoming titles at the Winter Consumer Electronic Trade Show beginning January 6, 1995, in Las Vegas. Disney often showcased their storybook titles at E3, such as The Hunchback of Notre Dame in 1996 and Mulan in 1998. The Lion King Animated Storybook was included in the Sound Blaster Disney bundle, along with The Lion King Print Studio and The Lion King Screen Scenes. Through a partnership with Disney Interactive, the CanBeJam series of PC were exclusively bundled with CD-ROM titles for the Japanese market. In June 1996 it was announced that Apple Mcintosh Performa computers models came with the Apple Magic Collection, which bundled The Lion King Animated Storybook, Aladdin Activity Center, and a sneak peek of the film Toy Story. The Mirror held a Dalmatian Competition in 1997, in which they gave away ten free copies of 101 Dalmatians Animated Storybook to the winners. Winnie the Pooh and the Honey Tree Animated Storybook was demonstrated at the 1995 Consumer Electronics Show (CES) in Meeting Room No. M-6314, South 6 Annex. The game's release was part of a year-long, company-wide celebration of Disney's Winnie the Pooh franchise, which included cross-promotion with Disney Interactive, Disney Licensing, Buena Vista Home Video, Walt Disney Records and Disney Press. Purchases of Toddler, Preschool, or Kindergarten Winnie the Pooh video games resulted in a free copy of Winnie the Pooh and the Honey Tree Animated Storybook. The game was part of a "comprehensive advertising campaign in trade and consumer publications targeting family and home PC audiences". The Sunday Mirror and Nestle offered tickets for a free demo CD of the game; customers had to collect two tickets and pick up the CD from Tesco branches. A playable demo of Hercules was featured in the 1997 Electronic Entertainment Expo. In 1998, a game in the series was included in an iMac software bundle. In 1998, Mega offered five free copies of Mulan Animated Storybook and Mulan's Print Studio each in a promotion. Winnie-the-Pooh & Tigger Too Animated Storybook was released in retail stores on February 23, 1999, the same day as Sing a Song With Pooh Bear. In 1999, a copy of any game in Disney's Learning Series: Winnie the Pooh came with a free copy of Disney's Animated Storybook: Winnie the Pooh and the Honey Tree. The A List conducted a promotion through The Mirror to give away 10 copies of the program. In 2001, various entries within the series were repackaged with Ariel's Story Studio in Disney's Classic Animated Storybook Collection: Volumes 1 and 2. On March 1, 2002, Disney dropped the price of Winnie the Pooh and Tigger Too Animated Storybook to 9.99 pounds.

==== Promotion of Toy Story ====
Disney created a "multimillion-dollar marketing blitz" to promote Toy Story Animated Storybook, which included the "unchartered approach" of airing two 30-second TV spots television advertisement spots in 25 major markets. Pixar created new animation specifically for the commercial. While software company executives at the time did not see television ads as commercially viable, for the Animated Storybook series, Disney proceeded as it had strong ties with mass retailers (like Walmart and Target) and mainstream family appeal. The title's launch was supported with "TV, print and direct ads and, on the Web, through a tie-in with Dial for Kids soap". For the launch of Toy Story Animated Storybook, Disney Interactive offered a factory rebate and a website for its Hunt for the Lost Toy crossword puzzle contest, within 22 days, entrants into the contest could win 10,000 free copies of the new title and register for a grand-prize lottery for a free trip to Walt Disney World in Florida. In retail stores, Disney set up "elaborate POP displays featuring flashing lights and, in some cases, recorded Woody and Buzz voices activated by a motion sensor". A 30-second trailer for the game was played in 15 million copies of the home video release of The Aristocats, and Disney considered playing them in the Toy Story VHS too. Full-page print ads in computer-specialty, family and general-interest publications began in mid-July, with customers able to purchase a Toy Story backpack for $4.95. Features on the Toy Story Animated Storybook web site included "printout mazes coloring pages, connect-the-dots pages a product preview, screen shots and a printable form for a $5 rebate with the purchase of the Toy Story CD-ROM and two Dial For Kids bath products". From May to June the website received more than 15 million hits, making it one of the top 10 sites on the Internet. Disney sponsored demonstrations of the title in Computer City locations. A toll-free telephone number was set up to provide consumer support six days a week for all Disney Interactive products. The campaign continued until the Toy Story film was released on video in sell-through, with Toy Story Activity Center and the Toy Story Animated Storybook being featured in a trailer on the video release. In addition, "[a] cross-promotion with Campbell Soup's Spaghetti-O's" was planned, as well as a cross-promotion with McDonald's to begin in November, at which time, a McDonald's activity book would feature a coupon offering consumers a free CD holder with the purchase of the StoryBook CD-ROM".

=== Commercial success ===
Disney takes recognizable characters and movies and turns them into educational discs for kids quicker than you can say, "Jiminy Cricket". The strategy of building discs around big-ticket movies and well-known characters has paid off big.

— George Mannes, Daily News

By February 18, 1995, Disney's Animated Storybook: The Lion King had sold 400,000 copies since its November 1994 release. About 30 percent of these units were sold through mass merchants like Wal-Mart, Kmart, Target and Sears. The Lion King became the top selling children's title in 1994 and 1995; in 1994 it was the seventh best-selling CD-ROM after Myst, Doom II, 5 ft. 10 PAK Volume 1, Star Wars: Rebel Assault, The 7th Guest, and Microsoft Encarta. Together, The Lion King and a Winnie the Pooh title grossed between $1 and $2 million in the fourth quarter of 1994. According to PC Data data released in November 1995, The Lion King had the eighth highest retail penetration, being featured in at least three-quarters of 16 major chains. In December 1995, Pocahontas was the tenth best selling CD-ROM software title of any genre. Disney's Animated Storybook: Pocahontas and Disney's Animated Storybook: Winnie the Pooh and the Honey Tree were among the top three sellers for the 1995 Christmas season. From January to April 1996, the two games were ranked among the top three titles in the Education category, according to PC Data. By May 1996, the first five titles in the series were some of the best selling children's titles in the United States. On May 13, 1996, PR Newswire reported that in the three weeks since the release of Disney's Animated Storybook: Toy Story, the game sold more than 100,000 copies in retail. The Guardian notes The Toy Story Animated Storybook sold well "in terms of a quasi-educational CD-Rom". In December 1996's education hits list, 101 Dalmatians and Toy Story occupied the first and fourth spots, respectively. Throughout 1996, Toy Story sold more than 500,000 units, generating $15.9 million in U.S. sales. In the first five months of 1997, 101 Dalmatians was the best-selling educational title, making $4.4 million in sales. Disney's Animated Storybook: Toy Story was the best selling software title of 1996, selling over 500,000 copies. The 1996 games Toy Story Animated Storybook and Toy Story Activity Center had a combined sales total of around one million units by March 31, 1997. The Hunchback of Notre Dame was among the top-10 selling children's animated CD-ROM titles for 1997. Hercules was the best selling educational title of 1997. Throughout 1997, 101 Dalmatians Animated Storybook generated $7.69 million in sales. In the week of December 13, 1997, Ariel's Story Studio was the third-best selling home education software. According to PC Data, Disney's Animated Storybook: Mulan was the top-selling home education software at 11 software retail chains, representing 47 percent of the U.S. market, for the week of July 25. By October 1998, The Lion King had sold over 1 million units.

== Critical reception ==
In general, later titles were more negative received than earlier titles. The Toy Story title was highlighted with critical acclaim and Ariel's Story Studio was nominated for Computer Edutainment Game of the Year at the first D.I.C.E. Awards, losing to Where in Time Is Carmen Sandiego? The game also received a Best Educational Software award from DiscoverySchool.com. In 1994, Media Station received the 1995 Michigan's Leading Edge Technologies Award for the inventions and applications that the company developed and used in The Lion King, Winnie the Pooh and the Honey Tree, Hunchback, and 101 Dalmatians. Upon its release, The Lion King received "Pick of the Year" by Entertainment Weekly. It also received the most votes for the 1995 Computer Retail Week in the Best Educational Software category, but it was disqualified for being released before January 1. Parents reviewed Winnie the Pooh and the Honey Tree as part of their series entitled The best of 1995: Software. Disney's Animated Storybook, Hercules sold more than 40,000 copies within five weeks.

=== Gameplay and plot ===
"It seemed less like a book on CD-ROM and more like a scaled-down version of the movie."

— PC Novice

Computer Shopper positively compared the series to Living Books' Arthur's Reading Race and The Berenstain Bears Get in a Fight. saying the activities in Disney's Animated Storybook were "purely entertaining". Three of the games were featured in The New York Times Guide to the Best Children's Videos. Carol S. Holzberg of Computer Shopper said the games paled in comparison to the films they were based on, but felt they were still "excellent" and "engaging". Chicago Sun-Times thought it was a "perfect digital playmate". FamilyPC's 19 playtesters reviewed the series positively. Discovery Education wrote that the games were "fun and creative", and that it would appeal to children aged three to eight. The Boston Herald said Ariel's Story Studio's strong point was in its soundtrack and karaoke activity, as opposed to Anastasia's adventure game mechanics. Superkids felt Toy Story had more 'click-and-see-what-happens' objects than any other storybook program they'd seen. Superkids praised Hunchback for "combining beautiful animation with a much sanitized version of a classic story". The Lion King's gameplay and narrative has been negatively compared to those of the Virgin Interactive game tie-in to the film. Chicago Tribune suggested that the 'read' option would be for those who were just learning how to read, while the 'read and play' option could be accessed by those who were more skilled in reading and computers. Maev Kennedy from The Guardian thought that Winnie the Pooh and the Honey Tree was tainted by his belief that Disney's Winnie the Pooh franchise loses the multi-layered nature of A. A. Milne's original book series, describing the game as "slow, unsophisticated, and dull". AllGame felt that children would stick with their games due to their high replayability, and recommended parents spend their money on the better games in the series.

David Bloom of Daily News said that Mulan was "well-done", and thought the "greater strength of the program" was the inclusion of additional activities and games beyond the storybook, such as a dress-up room for Mulan to try on traditional clothing. The Boston Herald thought the game was a mixture of "absurdly simple tasks" and "practically impossible ones" while finding the dialogue "repetitive" and "irritating". Joseph Szadkowski of The Washington Post's favourite part of the game was the printable and customisable calendar. Another reviewer from that newspaper wrote that the animated storybook video game series was "thoughtfully designed product marred by a few miscalculations that lessen its impact." Tara Hernandez of AllGame praised the PlayStation version of Mulan for its graphics, sound, and characters; the site noted that achieving the title of Imperial Storymaker requires both "imagination and creativity" from the player. IGN deemed it "curious" that Disney broke away from its previous platformer formula for its console games. The Boston Herald reviewer Robin Ray offered a scathing review of Winnie the Pooh and Tigger Too, commenting that the game was "mangled", "dull", humorless, and had "simply bad design". A reviewer from The Washington Post had a similar opinion, describing the game as "completely charmless", and that the "colorful, whimsical prose" of the source material had been translated into "leadenness". Arizona Republic felt the later games lacked interesting gameplay and visuals. The Los Angeles Times criticized Disney for contracting their games to independent studios, deeming the series a "mere imitation of Broderbund's Living Books format". The study Talking Storybook Programs for Students with Learning Disabilities found that "Living Books programs appeared more comprehensible to students than the Disney programs". The Washington Post felt the game offered a "Reader's Digest version of the plot". Chicago Tribune said in regards to Tigger Too, "As cute as the program is, it lacks substance. The games are very basic on all levels and offer no surprises after repeat play". MacUser felt the games contained "repetitive, uninspired content". The Washington Post observed that kids ignored the text and played around with the onscreen hotspots and interactive games.

=== Education and girl-orientation ===
The Exceptional Parent recommended the series due to allowed parents to "develop [their] child's interest in words and reading". Daily News appreciated that some of the more difficult words came with their own poems to help players understand their meanings. The Beacon News reported that a three-year-old girl "already knows more about computers than people several times her age" because the game reads to her and lets her interact with the story. Daily Record praised Disney's creation of quality software in an untapped market, writing that through this series, the company "manage[d] to home in on a niche market others tend to ignore – the ankle-biters who can work a keyboard and mouse as efficiently as a rattle or a spinning top". A review in The Austin Chronicle praised the inclusion of brain-stimulating puzzles and a thesaurus for "highlighted words in the narration", adding that its appeal to adults was "the true genius of a disk like this". The Washington Post deemed it "a cut above" the standard for educational video games. Rocky Mountain News reviewer Karen Algeo-Krizman felt the games would win over parents due to its educational value. Edutaining Kids wrote that The Little Mermaid was the most "educationally valuable" out of the three titles included in the Disney Princess Jewelry Box Collection, along with Disney's Princess Fashion Boutique and Disney Princess Magical Dress-Up. T.J. Deci of AllGame noted that the stories were presented as "colorful" adventures, and that the activities encourage players to acquire "good memory and pattern recognition" skills. Upon the original release of The Lion King, Spanish newspaper Super PC noted the game's limited pedagogical use due to the English subtitles and dialogue, hoping that Buena Vista would release a Spanish version. The New York Times felt the series was entertaining and educational without being didactic, as well as "wholesome and life-affirming". Personal Computer Magazine felt the titles would delight fans of the films, but that parents would not be pleased with their lack of educational content. Austin Chronicle appreciated the highlighted words to help children expand their vocabulary. A pilot study at the University of Arizona, Goldstein (1994) found that "children, allowed to use animated storybooks on their own, never interacted with the reading component at all, only with the animated pictures". Scholastic Early Childhood Today liked the "interactive theaurus" as seen in titles like 101 Dalmatians.

SuperKids thought The Little Mermaid was a crowd-pleaser, and a nice entry in the edutainment category that would appeal to girls. Rocky Mountain News gave the game a "tentative endorsement", and said that it helped to counteract the bias toward boy-oriented video games and offered an opportunity for "computer-savvy girls to cheer". Lynn Voedisch of the Chicago Sun-Times described Pocahontas as a "girl-targeted CD-ROM". The Age felt that Mulan saw a "departure from most of Disney's appeal-to-everyone efforts", and would therefore be of more interest to girls than boys. The Sydney Morning Herald thought the "beautiful storybooks" and "gorgeous grotto" would make Ariel's Story Studio popular with girls. The Chicago Tribune described Hercules as the anti-Pocahontas due to having boy-oriented games and activities.

=== Audiovisuals ===
The first full-length Disney animated film to be adapted into an adventure game was The Black Cauldron; it was not until Disney's Animated Storybook that Disney achieved a "stunning visual quality" that was comparable to the theatrical films, according to Disney Stories: Getting to Digital. The Boston Herald thought the games were "beautifully produced", though it did not consider them edutainment. Daily News felt the series offered "terrific" examples of the interactive storybook genre, which read as pages out of a printed children's book. Coming Soon Magazine felt the series "[had] many things to attract young children like animal characters and great artwork". Beth Kljajic from Adventure Learning Club said the games were "very poorly written". Entertainment Weekly said the series offered stripped-down bare-bones retellings. Knight Ridder Tribune said the games' "lush animation" succeeded in "capturing the warm and fuzzy texture" of the source material. The Columbian writer Mike Langberg wrote that the games "faithfully reproduces the story, visual style, voices and music" of the original. A Knight Ridder Tribune article written by John J. Fried and William R. Macklin commented that while Pocahontas was "beautifully rendered", it was "poorer" than Winnie the Pooh and the Honey Tree due to not featuring any songs. Entertainment Weekly commented that Disney's Animated Storybook contained "all the familiar scenes" from the movies they were based on, albeit augmented by entertaining point-and-click activities. When comparing the Hunchback and Dalmatians Storybooks, a writer from the Sun-Sentinel said "the Hunchback's tale is deeper, more lustrously animated and gives kids more to do than Dalmatian". Meanwhile, a reviewer from Technology & Learning described the two games as "appealing" and "beautifully rendered". The Austin Chronicle noted that the style elements of the originals are "vividly woven in". AllGame reviewer Brad Cook commented that the games brought the films they were based on to life. Super PC noted that the game could only work properly with a 16-bit sound card and a graphics card that could handle the .avi files; the newspaper felt it was unreasonable to require a high-end PC for a children's educational game, and noting the wasted space on the CD, thought it would be better to have released a less-quality game that could work with lower-end systems. Mark Manarick praised the games for the cartoon graphics, characters, and sound taken directly from their movies. Working Mother felt games were "absolutely addictive", calling the audiovisuals "fun" and "zany". The Chicago Tribune felt that the "Dalmatians" CD-ROM was very successful "in seamlessly guiding players into and out of each screen" due to their entrances and exits integrated into doorways. The paper felt that in Tigger Too's case "the quality animation and sweetly familiar characters will give the program a lot more mileage among youthful Pooh fans than it otherwise deserves". Video Business favourably compared the series' animations positively to 1996's Puss in Boots: The Animated Storybook. Reviewing Winnie the Pooh and Tigger Too – the last game in the series – The Washington Post criticized its "charmless[ness]" and "leadenness", adding that its "jerky, disjointed narration are confusing to follow because characters move abruptly from scene to scene without much of a connecting theme". In 1997, The Times London deemed 101 Dalmatians as "[j]ust about the best Disney Interactive title to date". Consumer Reports noted that the quality of the series fluctuates between games, praising 101 Dalmatian while finding fault with Hercules' writing and Toy Story's user friendliness. The Seattle Times suggested that "While the content of these products is fairly shallow, Disney sets high standards for the graphics and animation".

==== Toy Story ====
Developed at Pixar, who worked on the original rather than a third-party developer, Toy Story was frequently highlighted to have an audio-visual quality separate from other entries in the series. The Times Leader gave particular praise to Toy Story, and felt it was a "major jump in entertainment and new media technology, where we get a glimpse of the magic of bringing a feature film to home computers" due to its dance, glow-in-the-dark, and virtual flashlight sequences. Detroit Free Press highlighted the title's "whiz-bang animation, that 'far surpass much of the stiffer animation of other CD-ROM games for kids'", but felt there was a missed opportunity for "imaginative interaction" was for players to create custom toys from parts like Sid. El Paso Times wrote that Toy Story "delivers almost everything that made the movie special". Entertainment Weekly praised the animation, noting "the sequences...(which so closely mirror those in the film) have an immediate, you-are-there quality", in comparison to other video game adaptions of movies which "present scenes from the original flick in a truncated, non-interactive manner that can be mildly off-putting for both kids and adults". WorldVillage agreed that Toy Story was "a work of art". The Washington Post said the absence of the film's two main stars "does not diminish the enjoyment" of the game. The Buffalo News said the game "captures the spirit and humor of the film". The Record thought the game had "first-rate production values". Popular Magazine felt the visual results were "much the same as the film". Macworld felt the "3-D imaging is superb for a children's edutainment package". PC World felt the game's humor worked for children and adults. In a negative review, The New York Times wrote that the game was like the film except less interesting, less detailed, simplified, and purported to be educational. Andy Pargh from Design News said that it "features the best 3-D graphics and animated sequences I have ever seen on a computer program". The Washington Post wrote the title offered evidence of more medium-appropriate software, that the game was "a groundbreaker that takes so many liberties with the basic 'animated storybook' format", and "threatens to liberate the entertainment megalith from the profitable-but-inane 'storybook' format".

=== Part of Disney franchises ===
"Computer-based books, because of their length, cannot include as much information as a film. In the Disney programs, sometimes there are gaps in the story, sometimes the story moves very quickly from one plot episode to another, and sometimes major plot elements are poorly explained."

— Enhancing the Reading Skills of Students with Learning Disabilities through Hypermedia-Based Children's Literature

Much of the discourse was around how the games fit into the larger Disney franchises. The Philadelphia Inquirer felt the series "illustrates the dangers of runaway cross-promotion", deeming it Disneymania at its most bland, uninteresting, mundane, stale, and wafer-thin, and accusing it of following the trend rather than setting it. El Paso Times thought the titles' complete names – necessary to tie them into their franchises – came across as awkward. On a positive note, The Post-Crescent felt the games could allow young audiences to remain in the fantasy adventure worlds long after the film credits rolled, calling it a "perfect digital playmate. filled with cartoon sequences and interactive content. Daily News suggested that "both [Ariel's Story Studio and Anastasia: Adventures with Pooka and Bartok] can have lives lasting far longer than the movies will be in theaters". Albuquerque Journal thought that 101 Dalmatians in particular may encourage "nostalgic blast bonding" of children with their parents who remember the 1961 film's original release. Macworld agreed that the "biggest appeal is its connection to the movie". French newspaper Liberation felt the series was "long, verbose, not very playful and ultimately not very interactive".

Detroit Free Press felt that the games would only appeal to fans of their respective film inspirations. Joseph Szadkowski of The Washington Times thought that the video games were a product line extension that served as an example of how Disney was "cram[ming] the movie...down the throats of unsuspecting consumers", although he said the graphics were "amazing". A writer from Entertainment Weekly praised Disney's "slick" series of digital pop-up books. PC Entertainment felt the edutainment games allowed their respective properties to "live on", though that they would only appeal to die-hard fans of the originals. The Chicago Tribune felt the series was a way for Disney to flex its "synergistic marketing muscles". When Toronto Star heard about the series, they were concerned that "they would flood the market with mediocre, repurposed products in a bald attempt to exploit their tremendous treasure trove of highly marketable and much-loved characters".

The Washington Post felt the games were part of "merchandising empire[s] just as a good children's story should [be]". Tekst.no: strukturer og sjangrer i digitale medier acknowledged that Disney had been adapting many of their cartoons into storybooks, describing their efforts as having "varying results". PC Mag expressed surprise that the games, against all odds, were able to match the magic of the properties that preceded them, saying the game never gets tiresome. The Los Angeles Times argued "Disney succeeded in spite of the problems with its games because of the extraordinary popularity of its characters and because the parents who buy the products trust the Disney name--and aren't necessarily looking for leading-edge technology". Toronto Star felt that Disney had "perfected the edutainment CD-ROM formula" with the animated storybooks. Computer Retail Week noted that success followed "virtually any title tied to a Disney movie". Billboard described them as "Releases linked to established franchises-from hit movies to time-tested characters".

== Awards ==
Year	Nominee / work	Award	Result
1997	Disney's Animated Storybook: 101 Dalmatians	Best Buy Award	Won
1997	Disney's Animated Storybook: 101 Dalmatians	P & C Recommendation Award	Won
1997	Disney's Animated Storybook: Toy Story	Technical Innovation Award: Best After Hours Product	Won

== See also ==
- Living Books
- Magic Tales
- Disney's Activity Center
- Playtoons
- The Kidstory Series
