= Disney's Activity Center =

- The 1994 video game Disney's Aladdin Activity Center
- Developers: Disney Software / Disney Interactive; Gryphon Software
- Publisher: Disney Software / Disney Interactive
- Platforms: Microsoft Windows, Mac OS, PlayStation
- First release: Disney's Aladdin Activity Center; 1994

Disney's Activity Center is a series of PC and PlayStation games released by Disney Interactive with each title consisting of various activities and minigames to be completed, using aspects of their licensed property.

== Development ==
Starting in 1996, Sanctuary Woods staff in their local Victoria, British Columbia office became a small part of Disney Interactive's 300 employees, handling the programming, sound and graphic design, and art. Meanwhile, Disney Interactive managed the animation and creative from their Burbank head office. The developers aimed to have a "true and fair representation of the original property", having the feature films' directors and producers working alongside their artists and designers. The developer was one of several interactive divisions of film studios sprouting at the time, including Universal Interactive Studios, Turner Interactive, Fox Interactive, Sony Imagesoft, and Imagination Pilots (MGM). Disney Interactive felt the initial success of the Activity and Storybook games would boost the success of their Learning Series (kicked off with Ready to Read with Pooh) and the first game from their creativity line Disney's Draw & Paint.

== List of games ==
Game	Year of release	Notes
Disney's Activity Center: Aladdin	November 1994	The game's designers and artists worked hand in hand with the film's directors and producers. The title sold 100,000 copies by 18 February 1995.
Disney's Activity Center: The Lion King	1995	
Disney's Activity Center: Toy Story	1996	
Disney's Activity Center: The Lion King II: Simba’s Pride	1998	
Disney's Activity Center: A Bug's Life	1998	
Disney's Activity Center: Beauty and the Beast	1999	
Disney's Activity Center: Tarzan	1999	
Disney's Activity Center: Toy Story 2	2000	
Disney's Activity Center: Winnie the Pooh	2000	Based on the story Winnie the Pooh and the Blustery Day.
Disney's Activity Center: Dinosaur	May 16, 2000	
Disney's Activity Center: The Little Mermaid II: Return to the Sea	2000	
Disney's Activity Center: 102 Dalmatians	2001	
Disney's Activity Center: The Emperor's New Groove	2001	
Disney's Activity Center: Atlantis: The Lost Empire	2001	
Disney's Activity Center: Tigger	March 2001	

== Critical reception ==
On AllGame, Disney's The Lion King Activity Center received 3.5 stars, Disney's Aladdin Activity Center received 3.5 stars, Disney's Toy Story Activity Center received 3.5 stars, Disney's Winnie the Pooh Activity Center received 3.5 stars, Disney's 102 Dalmatians Activity Center received 3.5 stars, Disney's Dinosaur Activity Center received 2 stars, Disney's Tigger Activity Center received 3 stars, and Disney's Tarzan Activity Center received 3 stars.

The Boston Herald thought that by 1999, the titles had become predictable cash-ins to Disney films, who would generally have voice actor replacements and the same structure as previous games in the series; the newspaper also commented that Activity Center games were one part of the triad (along with the "action game" and the "print studio" that Disney Interactive would generally release with each new film). Knight Ridder thought the Tarzan triad weren't groundbreaking yet fun enough to keep kids entertained, deeming the Activity Center as a pleasant diversion. The Herald News thought the series was catered toward children and kept them in mind during the design process. The Washington Post considered the games as tie-ins that Disney was cranking out at the time, strictly for fans of the film properties. The Los Angeles Times noted the games featured an online component, but the Internet content wasn't assured as safe by Disney.

== Commercial performance ==
Aladdin was the 3rd most popular education game in the week ended December 2, 1995, and 4th most popular in the Macintosh category in the week ended December 9, 1995. The Lion King was the most popular title in the Macintosh category in the week ended February 3, 1996, the 2nd most popular title in the Macintosh category in the week ended March 5, 1996, and the 8th most popular in the week ended May 4, 1996. In the month of May 1997, Toy Story was the 3rd top-selling software in Home Education (MS-DOS/Windows), while Aladdin and The Lion King were the 4th and 8th best-selling under Home Education (MacIntosh). Tarzan was the 4th top selling education title in the week ended July 17, 1999.

== See also ==
- Disney's Animated Storybook
