= How to Lose a Guy in 10 Days =

2003 romantic comedy film

- Theatrical release poster
- Directed by: Donald Petrie
- Screenplay by: Kristen Buckley; Brian Regan; Burr Steers
- Based on: How to Lose a Guy in 10 Days by: Michele Alexander; Jeannie Long
- Produced by: Lynda Obst; Robert Evans; Christine Peters
- Starring: Kate Hudson; Matthew McConaughey; Adam Goldberg; Michael Michele; Shalom Harlow
- Cinematography: John Bailey
- Edited by: Debra Neil-Fisher
- Music by: David Newman
- Production companies: Paramount Pictures; W2 Film Production
- Distributed by: Paramount Pictures
- Release dates: February 7, 2003 (United States); April 17, 2003 (Germany)
- Running time: 116 minutes
- Countries: United States; Germany
- Language: English
- Budget: $50 million
- Box office: $177.5 million

How to Lose a Guy in 10 Days is a 2003 romantic comedy film directed by Donald Petrie, from a script by Kristen Buckley, Brian Regan, and Burr Steers, and starring Kate Hudson and Matthew McConaughey. Loosely based on the picture book of the same name by Michele Alexander and Jeannie Long, the plot concerns a women's magazine writer and an advertising executive who both begin a relationship with ulterior motives. While the story and characters in the film are original, the dating "don'ts" of the picture book are included in the film.

How to Lose a Guy in 10 Days was released theatrically by Paramount Pictures in the United States on February 7, 2003, and in Germany on April 17, 2003, and was a box office success, grossing $177.5 million against a production budget of $50 million. The film received mixed reviews from critics, who praised Hudson and McConaughey's acting and chemistry, but criticized the script and predictable plot.

== Plot ==
Andie Anderson is a columnist for the women's magazine Composure in New York. As the writer of a series of "How to" articles, she is dissatisfied with her work and wishes to write about more serious issues. When her friend Michelle experiences yet another breakup, Andie is inspired to write an article on "How to Lose a Guy in 10 Days". She will begin dating a man and attempt to drive him away "only using the classic mistakes women make".

Meanwhile, advertising executive Benjamin Barry is looking to branch out from his usual remit of beer and sports campaigns by leading a prestigious ad campaign for a diamond company. Ben meets his boss Phillip Warren, and rival coworkers Judy Spears and Judy Green at a bar. To prove he is capable of pitching to women, Ben wagers that he can make any woman fall in love with him. Phillip agrees that if he can achieve this by the company ball in 10 days, he will get to lead the diamond campaign. Spears and Green, who were at Composure magazine offices earlier that day and know about Andie's planned article, pick her as the woman for the bet.

Ben and Andie start their relationship, neither revealing their true intentions. Soon, Andie kicks off a series of actions to drive Ben away, including making him miss the final moments of a Knicks game, creating a scrapbook of their future children, naming his penis Princess Sophia, and stocking his apartment with feminine hygiene products, stuffed toys, pink coverings, a not-yet-housebroken puppy, and a "love fern".

During a boys' poker game night Andie arrives unannounced and behaves outrageously, driving Ben to finally break up with her, to her relief. However, Ben's friends Tony and Thayer push him to stay the course, proposing couple's therapy. Ben chases after Andie and she reluctantly agrees to continue the relationship. Andie has Michelle pose as a therapist and together they criticize Ben, who placates them by offering to introduce Andie to his family in Staten Island that weekend. During the trip, Andie finds she truly likes his family, and is moved when Ben's mother asks her not to break his heart. Ben and Andie begin to form a genuine bond.

On the tenth day Andie and Ben go to the company ball together. Phillip meets Andie, and later tells Ben that he "met her, she loves you, you win". To sabotage Ben, Spears and Green tell Tony and Thayer that Andie knew about the bet all along and was playing along to help Ben win. Tony and Thayer ask Andie to keep quiet, unwittingly making her aware of the bet. At the same time, Andie's boss, Lana, unaware of Ben's role, tells him about Andie's article. After Andie attempts to humiliate Ben in front of everyone at the party, he responds in kind. The pair argue on stage and break up.

Tony shows Andie's subsequent article to Ben, in which she writes how she "lost the only guy I've ever fallen for". When he goes to see her, he discovers she has quit her job at Composure, as Lana still refuses to let her write about serious topics, and is on her way to Washington, D.C., for a job interview.

Ben chases after her taxi and gets Andie to pull over. He asks her if what she wrote in the article was true, and when she says yes, accuses her of running away. They reveal their true feelings for each other and kiss.

== Cast ==
- Kate Hudson as Andie Anderson
- Matthew McConaughey as Benjamin Barry
- Adam Goldberg as Tony
- Bebe Neuwirth as Lana Jang
- Michael Michele as Judy Spears
- Shalom Harlow as Judy Green
- Robert Klein as Phillip Warren
- Kathryn Hahn as Michelle Rubin
- Thomas Lennon as Thayer
- Celia Weston as Glenda
- Annie Parisse as Jeannie
- Liliane Montevecchi as Mrs. DeLauer
- Tony Longo as Sensitive Moviegoer
- William Duell as Old Concession Worker
- Rebecca Harris as Dora
- Marvin Hamlisch as himself (cameo)
- Warner Wolf as himself (cameo)

== Production ==
Gwyneth Paltrow and director Mike Newell were originally attached to the project but producer Lynda Obst was unable to get Newell to commit to a date and Paltrow went on to work on the film View from the Top.

The yellow gown Kate Hudson wore in the movie was created by Carolina Herrera with the film's costume designer. The necklace she wears is called, in the film, the "Isadora Diamond", named after Isadora Duncan. The 80-carat yellow diamond in the necklace was designed by Harry Winston and is worth $6 million.

The apartment interiors were conceived by Yeadon-born sculptor Zoë Waterman, who said she thought the characters should live in "spaces which I consider to be dream spaces. That is to say their apartments are as close as I've seen on screen to my dream apartment. I just said to myself 'where would I absolutely love to live in my wildest dreams?', and the whole design came together in about fifteen minutes."

== Soundtrack ==
How to Lose a Guy in 10 Days: Music from the Motion Picture

Soundtrack album by Various Artists
- Released: January 28, 2003
- Genres: Rock, Pop, Folk, World & Country, Stage & Screen
- Length: 42:00
- Label: Virgin Records

How to Lose a Guy in 10 Days: Music from the Motion Picture was released on January 28, 2003, by Virgin Records.

How to Lose a Guy in 10 Days: Music from the Motion Picture

1. "Somebody Like You" – Keith Urban (3:51)
2. "Good Day" – Luce (4:06)
3. "Feels Like Home" – Chantal Kreviazuk (4:41)
4. "Who Do You Love?" – George Thorogood and the Destroyers (4:21)
5. "Let's Stay Together" – Al Green (3:15)
6. "Follow You Down" – Gin Blossoms (4:29)
7. "You're So Vain" – Carly Simon (4:18)
8. "Kiss Me" – Sixpence None the Richer (3:19)
9. "L-O-V-E" – Fisher (2:37)
10. "Catch Me If You Can" – The Beu Sisters (3:35)
11. "Weight of the World" – Chantal Kreviazuk (3:34)

== Reception ==
=== Critical response ===
On Rotten Tomatoes, the film holds an approval rating of 42% based on 150 reviews, with an average rating of 5.1/10. The site's critical consensus reads: "Matthew McConaughey and Kate Hudson are charming together, but they can't overcome How to Lose a Guy in 10 Days' silly premise and predictable script." Metacritic gave the film a weighted average score of 45 out of 100, based on 31 critics, indicating "mixed or average" reviews. Audiences polled by CinemaScore gave the film an average grade of "A–" on an A+ to F scale.

=== Box office ===
The film was released on February 7, 2003, and earned $23.8 million in its first weekend. Its final gross is $105.8 million in the United States and Canada, and $71.7 million internationally (excluding Canada), for a worldwide gross of $177.5 million against a production budget of $60 million.

As of December 2003, the video sold 3.79 million copies, earning revenue of $67.2 million.

=== Butter-Yellow gown ===
The butter-yellow silk gown worn by Kate Hudson has become an iconic dress in cinema fashion. Initially designed by Carolina Herrera, the backless dress was specifically constructed to complement the 84-carat "Isadora" yellow diamond necklace worn in the film.

== Sequel ==
In August 2026, a sequel has been reported to be in development.
