= Disney's 102 Dalmatians: Puppies to the Rescue =

2000 video game

102 Dalmatians: Puppies to the Rescue
- North American PlayStation cover art
- Developer: Toys for Bob (Note: Released under the Crystal Dynamics brand name. Ported to Dreamcast and Microsoft Windows by Prolific Publishing. Digital Eclipse developed the Game Boy Color version.)
- Publisher: Eidos Interactive (Note: Disney Interactive published the Windows version, while Activision published the Game Boy Color version.)
- Composers: Burke Trieschmann; Allister Brimble (Game Boy Color)
- Series: 101 Dalmatians
- Platforms: Windows, PlayStation, Dreamcast, Game Boy Color
- Release: Microsoft Windows: NA: November 2000; PlayStation: NA: November 13, 2000; EU: December 8, 2000; Dreamcast: NA: November 14, 2000; EU: December 20, 2000; Game Boy Color: NA: December 6, 2000; EU: December 8, 2000
- Genres: Platform, action-adventure
- Mode: Single-player

102 Dalmatians: Puppies to the Rescue is a 2000 platform game, loosely based on the 2000 film 102 Dalmatians. It was developed by Toys for Bob and published by Eidos Interactive for PlayStation and Dreamcast while Disney Interactive published the Windows version. The Game Boy Color version was developed by Digital Eclipse and published by Activision.

== Plot ==
=== Story ===
==== Console version ====
Two Dalmatian puppies named Oddball and Domino are out in the backyard looking for treasure. They find a toy buried in a park that was made at one of Cruella de Vil's toy factories; this alludes to the fact that Cruella's toy sales are down. Facing financial ruin from lack of sales, Cruella sets a plan in motion: To reprogram her toys to capture any pets in sight so she can freeze them in "Super-Gloop" and sell them as a new line of realistic animal toys. Oddball and Domino are the only puppies in their family who have not been captured when they return from the park. Their parents Dipstick and Dottie set out to rescue their puppies, asking Oddball and Domino to stay home. Instead, the puppies set out to save their siblings, and their parents, who are captured along the way.

==== Game Boy Color version ====
Cruella de Vil has reprogrammed the toys of her toy factory into kidnapping all the Dalmatian puppies and locking them in cages to power the factory once they get older. Two of the puppies Oddball and Domino were able to escape through their cages due to their small size and must free the puppies and escape the factory.

=== Setting ===
Similar to the film, the game is set in London, England. There are various levels in the game that are based on well-known places or monuments, such as Regent's Park, Piccadilly, Big Ben, and Stonehenge.

== Gameplay ==
The player can choose the role of Oddball (voiced by Molly Marlette) or Domino (voiced by Frankie Muniz in console versions). Over the course of the game, the player has several opportunities to collect 'stickers' towards a virtual sticker book which can be accessed through the level menu. Various actions within the game will unlock stickers. Generally, there is a sticker for exiting every level, collecting 100 bones in each level and rescuing all the puppies in each level. Each level has its own individual tasks which will also grant stickers: completing a chore, defeating a henchman and solving puzzles. There are six stickers per a level, excluding Cruella levels, which combine together with mini games for their own sticker image. The stickers are like puzzle pieces that create a realistic picture.

Puppies to the Rescue is a 3-dimensional game with the ability to angle the camera in whichever direction will make it easiest for navigation. The player must rescue the puppies by tumbling to break open the crates, and will also avoid and bark at enemy toys to short-circuit them, or tumble into them to smash them.

Checkpoints within a level are places where the player will be sent back if a life is lost and are marked by a parrot named Waddlesworth, who will come and give them a ride around the level if they collect all the bones in the level, if they stand in the right place. If a toy hurts the player four times, a life is lost. If a checkpoint has not been reached before a life is lost, the player is sent back to the starting point. Unlike the Game Boy Color version of the game where the toys are active after being broken, toys the players break stay broken. To regain lost health, the player can collect food in the levels and will also collect lives in them as well.

Each level has a 'spirit animal friend' who will tell the player how to get through the level, and sometimes assign Oddball or Domino specific tasks to do in return for a reward or assistance. Certain levels also feature one of Cruella's three main henchmen from both films: Jasper and Horace from 101 Dalmatians, and Le Pelt from 102 Dalmatians. Unlike enemy toys, they are invincible from normal attacks and the player must perform a certain task instructed by the level's animal friend in order to defeat them. After a specific number of levels has been completed, the player will face Cruella in a series of boss battles which will unlock a minigame to play upon completion.

== Reception ==
Reception

Aggregate scores
Aggregator	Score			
Aggregator	Dreamcast	GBC	PC	PS
GameRankings	74%	80%	N/A	76%
Metacritic	66/100	N/A	N/A	N/A

Review scores
Publication	Score			
Publication	Dreamcast	GBC	PC	PS
AllGame	3.5/5	N/A	4/5	N/A
Computer and Video Games	5/5	N/A	N/A	N/A
Game Informer	N/A	N/A	N/A	6.5/10
GameSpot	6.7/10	N/A	N/A	5.4/10
IGN	7/10	6/10	N/A	7/10
Nintendo Power	N/A	3.5/5	N/A	N/A
Official U.S. PlayStation Magazine	N/A	N/A	N/A	3.5/5

The Dreamcast version received "average" reviews according to the review aggregation website Metacritic.

David Zdyrko of IGN reviewed the PlayStation version and praised the voice-overs, cutscenes and mini-games, but criticized the game for being too easy in some places. Marc Nix of IGN reviewed the Dreamcast version and wrote: "The colors and emphasized building designs are vivid and sparkly. It's disappointing that the designers didn't even afford to sync the lips in the conversation scenes". Nix wrote of the Game Boy Color version: "The levels are sharp in creativity, and just as sharp in beauty. Though not as dazzling as can be done on the Game Boy Color, the levels are clean and vibrantly drawn".

Cathy Lu of Daily Radar praised the graphics and gameplay of the Game Boy Color version.

The game generated $400,000 in revenue.
