= Kristen Buckley =

American screenwriter and author

- Born: June 9, 1968 (age 58); New York City, New York
- Occupations: Screenwriter, author

Kristen Buckley (born June 9, 1968, in New York City, New York) is an American screenwriter and author. She co-wrote the screenplays for 102 Dalmatians (for which she also co-wrote the story), How to Lose a Guy in 10 Days, and Shoe Addicts Anonymous. She also wrote The Parker Grey Show (a novel) and Tramps Like Us (a memoir).
