= One Hundred and One Dalmatians (soundtrack) =

Soundtrack album by Various artists
- Released: 1961
- Recorded: October 5–6, 1960
- Studio: Unknown
- Genre: Soundtrack
- Length: 56:34

One Hundred and One Dalmatians is the soundtrack to the 1961 animated Disney film of the same name. It was recorded on October 5–6, 1960, and is 56:34 in length. The songs were written by George Bruns and Mel Leven.

== Track listing ==
All tracks are written by George Bruns & Mel Leven.

No.	Title	Performer(s)	Length
1.	"Overture"		3:09
2.	"A Beautiful Spring Day"		3:14
3.	"What's All the Hurry? / A Perfect Situation / Stir Things Up"		3:18
4.	"Cruella De Vil"	Bill Lee	5:03
5.	"Don't Worry, Perdy / The Puppies Are Here / Lucky How Marvelous / Not One / A Bloomin' Hero"		4:07
6.	"Ol' Thunder Always Wins"		2:46
7.	"Kanine Krunchies"	Lucille Bliss	0:30
8.	"Bedtime / An Evening Constitutional / A Job To Do / They're Gone!"		3:10
9.	"Dognapped! / Anita Darling / What'll We Do?"		3:06
10.	"All Dog Alert"		0:57
11.	"Sergeant Tibb's Recon / Cat Casserole"		1:35
12.	"Can You Leave Tonight? / Arduous Trek / Any News, Colonel? / I Want the Job Done"		3:56
13.	"Pulling a Snitch / Big Hullabaloo / Battling the Baduns"		3:51
14.	"My Darlings / 99 / Better Be Off / Fire One / All Clear"		3:36
15.	"Through the Snow / Shelter"		1:55
16.	"I'm Hungry / Get Some Rest / Back on the Road / Spotted!"		3:13
17.	"Dinsford / Cruella / A Roll in the Soot / To the Van / It Can't Be / Crazed / You Fools!"		5:19
18.	"Puppies Everywhere"		2:02
19.	"Dalmatian Plantation / Finale"	Bill Lee	0:57
20.	"Cruella De Vil (demo)"		0:50

== Critical reception ==
Allmusic gave the following review:

George Bruns' score for the 1961 animated classic 101 Dalmatians remains one of the most spirited Disney soundtracks from the company's heyday. A playful, jazz-inspired effort rich in superb action cues, it largely sidesteps the schmaltz and sentimentality that defines so much of the studio's musical output. Between the bebop-influenced writing of the "Overture" and the sprightly piano improvisations of "A Beautiful Spring Day," Bruns proves a gifted interpreter of jazz idioms, and even his large-scale orchestral themes emphasize brass over strings to further emphasize the music's bold, dramatic sensibilities. He's equally adept with comedy and suspense, mixing them most effectively on 101 Dalmatians' most memorable tune, "Cruella de Vil."
