= Brian Regan (writer) =

American screenwriter

- Occupation: Screenwriter

Brian Regan is an American screenwriter. He co-wrote the screenplays for 102 Dalmatians (for which he also co-wrote the story), How to Lose a Guy in 10 Days, and the yet-to-be-produced Shoe Addicts Anonymous.
