= Disney's Print Studio =

- Genres: Arts and crafts
- Developer: Disney Interactive
- Publisher: Disney Interactive
- Platforms: MS-DOS, Windows, Mac OS
- Original release: 1994-2004

Disney's Print Studio is a series of crafts/design computer games released by Disney Interactive, which allows players to print various types of documents in the themes of its licensed property. The 1994 Aladdin game was the precursor to the Print Studio games to follow, and set in motion the template of how those games would work.

== List of games ==
Game	Year of release
Disney's Beauty and the Beast Print Kit	1991
Disney's Aladdin Print Kit	1992
Disney's The Lion King Print Studio	1995
Disney's 101 Dalmatians Print Studio	1997
Disney's Print Studio: Mickey and Crew—Deluxe Edition	1997
Disney's Winnie the Pooh Print Studio	1997
Disney's Hercules Print Studio	1997
Disney's The Little Mermaid Print Studio	1998
Disney's Mulan Print Studio	1998
Disney-Pixar's A Bug's Life Print Studio	1998
Disney's Tarzan Print Studio	1999
Disney-Pixar's Toy Story 2 Print Studio	1999
Print Artist: Disney Mickey and Friends	2001
Disney's Classic Print Studio Collection	2001
Disney's Lilo & Stitch Play and Print	2002
Disney-Pixar's Monsters, Inc.: Play & Print	2002
Disney-Pixar's The Incredibles	2004

== Reception ==
AllGame gave Disney's Aladdin Print Kit a score of three out of five and wrote: "The program may not suit the truly artistic who prefer to send friends and family personal creations but will suffice for those who prefer simpler artistic pleasures."
