= 102 Dalmatians =

2000 film by Kevin Lima

- Theatrical release poster
- Directed by: Kevin Lima
- Screenplay by: Kristen Buckley; Brian Regan; Bob Tzudiker; Noni White
- Story by: Kristen Buckley; Brian Regan
- Based on: The Hundred and One Dalmatians by Dodie Smith Characters by John Hughes
- Produced by: Edward S. Feldman
- Starring: Glenn Close; Ioan Gruffudd; Alice Evans; Tim McInnerny; Gérard Depardieu; Eric Idle
- Cinematography: Adrian Biddle; Roger Pratt
- Edited by: Gregory Perler
- Music by: David Newman
- Production company: Walt Disney Pictures
- Distributed by: Buena Vista Pictures Distribution
- Release dates: November 13, 2000 (Radio City Music Hall); November 22, 2000 (United States)
- Running time: 100 minutes
- Country: United States
- Language: English
- Budget: $85 million
- Box office: $183.6 million

102 Dalmatians is a 2000 American adventure comedy film directed by Kevin Lima and written by Kristen Buckley, Brian Regan, Bob Tzudiker and Noni White from a story by Buckley and Regan. It is the sequel to 101 Dalmatians (1996), which was a live-action remake of the 1961 animated film of the same name; both were in turn based on Dodie Smith's 1956 novel The Hundred and One Dalmatians. It stars Glenn Close reprising her role as Cruella de Vil as she attempts to steal puppies for her "grandest" fur coat yet, with Ioan Gruffudd, Alice Evans, Tim McInnerny, Ian Richardson, Gérard Depardieu, Ben Crompton, Carol MacReady, Jim Carter, Ron Cook, David Horovitch, Timothy West, and the voice of Eric Idle in supporting roles. Close and McInnerny were the only two actors from the 1996 film to return for the sequel, while Adrian Biddle and Anthony Powell reprised their respective duties as cinematographer and costume designer.

102 Dalmatians premiered at Radio City Music Hall on November 13, 2000, and was theatrically released by Buena Vista Pictures Distribution under the Walt Disney Pictures label on November 22. The film received negative reviews from critics and grossed a total of $183.6 million worldwide against a budget of $85 million. It was nominated for the Academy Award for Best Costume Design.

A backstory film in its own continuity, Cruella, was released on May 28, 2021, with Emma Stone in the title role and Close acting as an executive producer.

== Plot ==
After three years in prison following the events of the previous film, Cruella de Vil has been cured of her desire for fur coats by psychologist Dr. Pavlov and becomes a changed woman. She is released on probation but warned that if she breaks parole she will be immediately sent back to prison, as well as be forced to pay the remainder of her fortune, £8 million, to all the dog shelters in Westminster. Cruella mends her working relationship with her much-abused valet Alonzo and buys the Second Chance Dog shelter, owned by Kevin Shepherd, to save it from insolvency. Cruella's probation officer, Chloe Simon, is the owner of Dipstick (one of the original 101 Dalmatians Cruella had stolen); she suspects Cruella will strike again despite her growing popularity as an animal person.

Dipstick's mate, Dottie, gives birth to three puppies: Domino, Little Dipper, and Oddball, who appears to be an albino, and begins to feel self-conscious about her lack of spots as she grows up. Meanwhile, Dr. Pavlov discovers that when his therapy patients are subjected to the chimes of Big Ben, they revert to their former personalities, but he conceals these findings from the public. Inevitably, when Big Ben rings in her presence, Cruella reverts to her former personality. After recognizing Dipstick and remembering her failed attempt of making a dalmatian fur coat, she enlists the help of French furrier Jean-Pierre LePelt. Together, they design a new fur coat, with the intention of using Dipstick's children for a hood as a part of Cruella's revenge.

Chloe and Kevin go out on a date, where Kevin tells Chloe that, if Cruella violates her parole, her entire fortune will go to him, since his dog shelter is the only one currently operating in Westminster. Knowing this, Cruella has Kevin framed for the theft of the first 99 dalmatian puppies LePelt takes, also exploiting the fact that Kevin has a prior record of dog-napping. She invites Chloe and Dipstick to her house for a dinner party to decoy them away while LePelt steals Dottie and her three puppies. Dipstick quickly returns to the apartment but is later captured. Chloe rushes home to save her pets but arrives too late. She is joined by Kevin, who has escaped from prison with the help of his talking macaw, Waddlesworth. Kevin explains that his earlier conviction was for breaking animals out of a lab, where they were being used for experiments.

Upon finding LePelt's lost ticket for the Venice Simplon-Orient-Express to Paris, Kevin and Chloe attempt but fail to stop Cruella and LePelt before their train departs. Waddlesworth and Oddball, who managed to escape, secretly follow them to LePelt's factory in Paris. Kevin and Chloe get there as well but they are discovered by Cruella, who locks them in a cellar. Despite this, they free the puppies through a hole in the ceiling. Cruella goes after the puppies alone, while Alonzo, having been mistreated beyond his patience, defeats LePelt and frees Kevin and Chloe. They pursue Cruella to a bakery and find that the puppies, led by Oddball, have tricked Cruella into being baked in an enormous cake. Cruella survives, then she and LePelt are both arrested.

Chloe and Kevin, exonerated from the theft accusation, return to London and are personally awarded the remnants of Cruella's fortune by Alonzo himself. Oddball's coat finally develops a few small spots, much to everyone's surprise.

== Cast ==
- Glenn Close as Cruella de Vil
- Gerard Depardieu as Jean-Pierre LePelt
- Ioan Gruffudd as Kevin Shepherd
- Alice Evans as Chloe Simon
- Tim McInnerny as Alonzo
- Ian Richardson as Mr. George Torte QC
- Ben Crompton as Ewan
- Carol Macready as Agnes Wilford
- Jim Carter as Detective Mike Armstrong
- Ron Cook as Mr. Remy Button
- David Horovitch as Dr. Ivan Pavlov
- Timothy West as Judge
- Eric Idle as the voice of Waddlesworth the Red-and-green macaw
- Kerry Shale as LePelt's Assistant

== Release ==
- On November 24, 1999, a teaser trailer was released with Disney/Pixar's Toy Story 2.
- On May 19, 2000, a second trailer was released with Dinosaur.

== Production ==
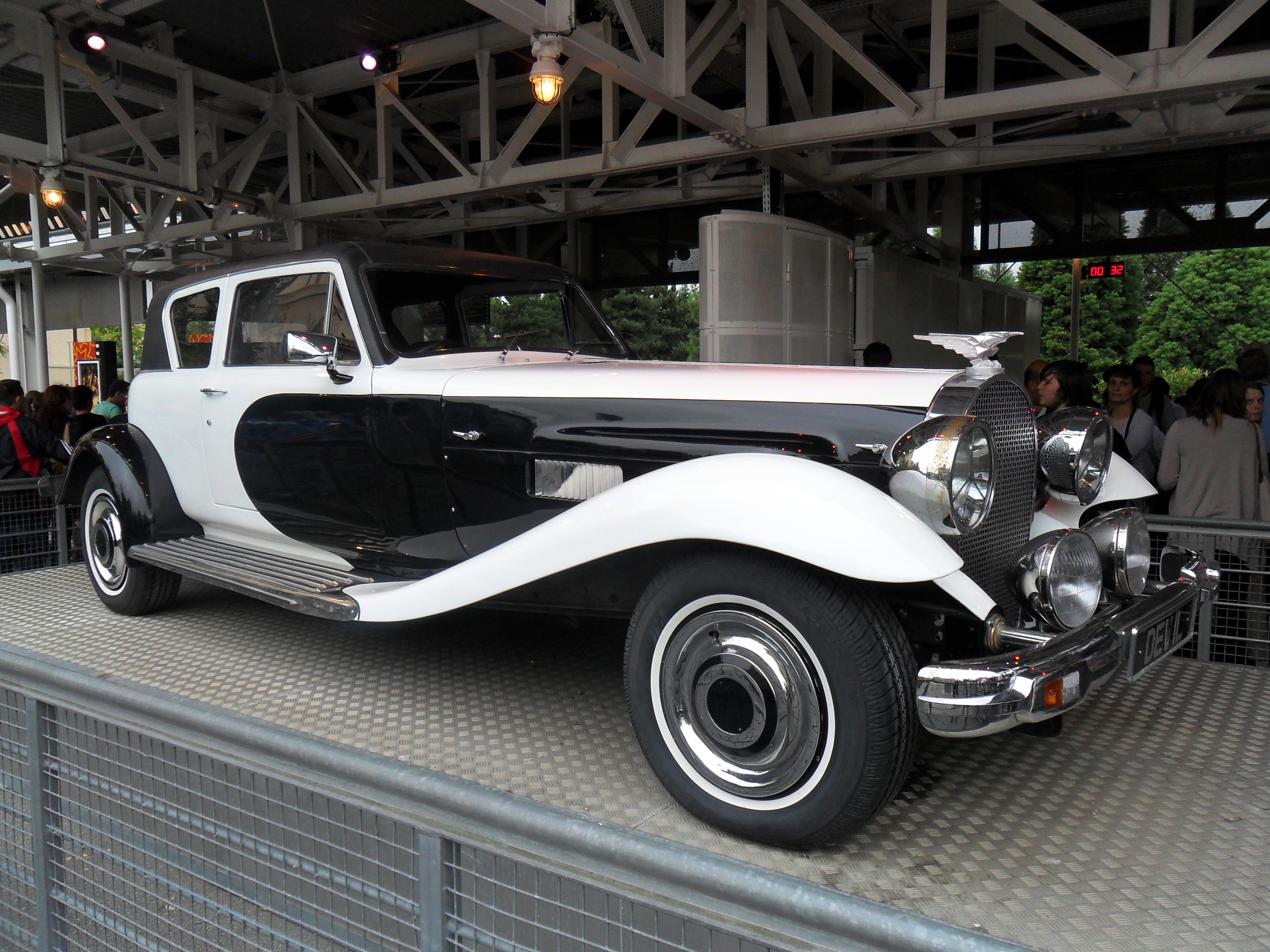
A customized Panther De Ville driven by Cruella de Vil in the film

The early working title was 101 Dalmatians Returns. Production began in December 1998 and ended in mid-November 1999 without the involvement of John Hughes who wrote and produced the 1996 film, due to the critical failure of Flubber and the shutdown of Great Oaks Entertainment. The film was set to be released on June 30, 2000, but was pushed back to November 22. Oxford Prison was used for the scene as Cruella walked out of prison. The teaser appeared in theaters before Toy Story 2 and Stuart Little as well as the home video release of Music of the Heart. 102 Dalmatians was filmed partially in Paris. On November 7, Disney released the soundtrack to the movie, including pre-eminently, a cover of Paul Anka's "Puppy Love" (sung by Myra) and original songs: Mike Himelstein's "What Can a Bird Do?" (voiced by Jeff Bennett), "My Spot in the World" (sung by Lauren Christy) and "Cruella De Vil 2000" (better known as "Cruella De Vil (102 Dalmatians)", performed by Camara Kambon featuring Mark Campbell of Jack Mack and the Heart Attack, a derivation of "Cruella de Vil").

The film is dedicated in memory of cameraman Mike Roberts, who died before it was released.

== Reception ==
=== Box office ===
The film opened at the third position behind M. Night Shyamalan's Unbreakable and Ron Howard's Dr. Seuss' How the Grinch Stole Christmas. The film grossed $67 million in the U.S. and $116.7 million in other territories, bringing its total to $183.6 million worldwide, making less than its predecessor.

=== Critical response ===
On Rotten Tomatoes, the film holds an approval rating of 30% based on 89 reviews, and an average rating of 4.50/10. The website's critics consensus reads: "This sequel to the live-action 101 Dalmatians is simply more of the same. Critics say it also drags in parts-- potentially boring children-- and that it's too violent for a G-rated movie." On Metacritic, the film has a weighted average score of 35 out of 100, based on 24 critics, indicating "generally unfavorable" reviews. Audiences polled by CinemaScore gave the film an average grade of "B+" on an A+ to F scale.

Roger Ebert gave the film 2.5 out of 4, writing: "Glenn Close does what can be done with the role. Indeed, she does more than can be done; Cruella is almost too big for a live-action film and requires animation to fit her operatic scale."

== Home media ==
102 Dalmatians was released on VHS and DVD on April 3, 2001. It was re-released on DVD on September 16, 2008.

== Video game ==
A video game loosely based on the film, that was entitled Disney's 102 Dalmatians: Puppies to the Rescue, was released in 2000, with Frankie Muniz as the voice of Domino, Molly Marlette as the voice of Oddball and Susanne Blakeslee as the voice of Cruella de Vil. Horace and Jasper also appeared in the game despite not being present in the film.

== Future ==
=== Backstory ===
A third live-action, centered around Cruella de Vil titled Cruella has been made, though it is standalone rather than connected. Glenn Close served as an executive producer on the project while Emma Stone played the eponymous role. The film was released on May 28, 2021.

=== Possible sequel ===
In May 2021, Glenn Close revealed that while working on Cruella as an executive producer, she wrote a new story as a sequel to the films where she would reprise the role of Cruella De Vil. The plot would involve the character in New York City and also take inspiration from The Godfather Part II. The actress intends to pitch it to the studio.
