= Ready to Read with Pooh =

1997 video game

- Developer: Disney Interactive Victoria
- Publisher: Disney Interactive
- Series: Winnie the Pooh
- Platforms: Macintosh, Windows
- Release: 1997

Ready to Read with Pooh is a 1997 interactive CD-ROM video game developed by Disney Interactive's Victoria studio that helps children from ages three to six, learn to read. There are nine activities in the game. When the player completes an activity successfully, they will receive an item that goes into a treehouse. A companion game Ready for Math with Pooh, which focused on math skills and has a garden and seven activities, was also released around the same time as this game.

== Gameplay and plot ==
The game starts with Pooh descending from the sky with a balloon singing the introduction song. If the game is already played, players can choose to resume or can start a new game. After Pooh lands near a tree house, which serves as the start of the game, he gives it to the player and Gopher shows up with a mailbox and that is where the player can type their name or chose to go back. The mailbox will have mail whenever the player returns to the tree house, in which the flag will be up if there's something inside. After Pooh explains the instructions, he is not seen again for the rest of the game, but is still heard off-screen. The cursor is a bee that looks at the player and flaps its wings if there's something clickable and looks at the background if there's nothing to click on. Clicking on the edge of the screen allows the player to exit an activity. Songs that are heard at the start of an activity or instructions can be skipped by simply clicking. Every activity has something that keeps track of how much the player still has to do to complete it. Pooh's honey pot on the bottom right corner serves as the options menu. Players can travels to three different parts of the Hundred Acre Woods by clicking the West, East, Home (which leads back to the tree house), or North paths and play one of the three games in each area. If the game is completed, a reward is presented to the player by Gopher, but if the game is played again, they won't get anything else. Every game has three levels and each level has a reward that can only be presented once. The rewards can later be seen in the tree house. The items and numerous other objects around the woods are clickable and have many different animations. Players can also enter the tree house by clicking on one of the two doors on the top or bottom of the tree house, as some items that they have won are found inside. If all activities in an area is fully completed, Tigger will present the player with a doorbell contraption that plays different sound effects depending on what the player selects. It can be upgraded if more games are completed. Most characters are not seen in the game but like Pooh, they are heard off-screen.

The game's counterpart, Ready For Math With Pooh, has many features that are exactly the same as its companion. The only major differences is that the starting point is in a garden where Pooh accidentally crushes a patch of thistles when first starting the game (the player has the option to revive them later). The mailbox is replaced with a wheelbarrow, which is where the player will type their name instead. Getting mail is still included, but the letter will be found attached to the fence at the back, which will blow away in the wind after the player reads it. The paths leading to the three areas in the Hundred Acre Wood are also still the same, but the Home path is replaced with the Garden path. Should the player come back later after completing several minigames, they will find that Rabbit has filled the garden with patches where they can plant seeds along with three packs of flower seeds, a watering can, a shrub, a scarecrow, a gleaming ball, and a basket. Sometimes, characters will leave items in the basket for another character (players will be informed of this via letters), who will come to the garden from the North path (except Owl, who instead descends from the sky) to collect the items. Every time the player returns to the garden, Gopher will pull down and eat some of the crops, so the player will have to replant them.

== See also ==
- List of Winnie the Pooh characters
