= Amazon Publishing =

Book publishing unit launched in 2009

- Parent company: Amazon
- Founded: 2009; 17 years ago
- Country of origin: United States
- Headquarters location: Seattle, Washington
- Key people: Mikyla Bruder (publisher); David Blum (publisher)
- Imprints: Amazon Encore, Amazon Crossing, Montlake Romance, Lake Union, Thomas & Mercer, 47North, Topple Books
- Official website: amazonpublishing.amazon.com

Amazon Publishing (or simply APub) is Amazon's book publishing unit launched in 2009. It is composed of 15 imprints including AmazonEncore, AmazonCrossing, Montlake Romance, Thomas & Mercer, 47North, and Topple Books.

Amazon publishes e-books via its Kindle Direct Publishing subsidiary.

== History ==
In May 2009, Amazon launched AmazonEncore, the inaugural flagship general imprint. It publishes titles that have gone out-of-print or self-published books with sales potential. The first book published under this imprint was Cayla Kluver's Legacy in August 2009. This was followed by ten more books in Fall 2010.

AmazonCrossing was announced in May 2010, for translated works into English. The first translated books were the French-language novel The King of Kahel and the German-language novel The Hangman's Daughter, released in November and December 2010, respectively.

In May 2011, Amazon launched two genre-focused imprints, Montlake Romance, and Thomas & Mercer. Montlake Romance is an imprint for the romance genre; "Romance is one of our biggest and fastest growing categories, particularly among Kindle customers," said Jeff Belle, vice president of Amazon Publishing. Thomas & Mercer is for mystery titles.

Powered by Amazon is a self-publishing platform that allows the publication of a series of books under any imprint name. For example, in May 2011, Seth Godin launched The Domino Project, an imprint created to publish a series of manifestos. It was the inaugural Powered by Amazon imprint project. Godin decided to end the imprint in November 2011, the 12 previously published titles would still be sold at Amazon, but no new books would be published. Also in May, it was announced Amazon had hired Larry Kirshbaum, former CEO of Time Warner Book Group, to head a new general-interest imprint. In October, Amazon launched a science-fiction/fantasy/horror imprint called 47North. In December, Amazon Publishing acquired over 450 titles of Marshall Cavendish's US Children's trade books business, Marshall Cavendish Children's Books (MCCB).

In January 2012, it was revealed that Amazon Publishing's New York publishing arm, called "Amazon Publishing's East Coast Group" (run by Larry Kirshbaum), made a deal with Houghton Mifflin Harcourt to sell books under a pseudonym imprint called New Harvest. New Harvest only included books from Amazon Publishing, and the books had a New Harvest imprint on the spine. This allowed Amazon to sell books at retailers like Barnes & Noble, which otherwise had disallowed Amazon imprints in its stores. Barnes & Noble however later announced it would not stock any Amazon imprints, including New Harvest, a move mirrored by other book stores which have also banned Amazon imprints from their stores. One of the inaugural titles published by New Harvest was Jeff, One Lonely Guy, by Jeff Ragsdale, released on March 20, 2012.

In June 2012, Amazon purchased Avalon Books, a small 62-year-old publisher that specializes in romance and mysteries with a back-list of around 3,000 titles. The books will be published under Amazon's imprints based in Seattle. In November, it was announced that Laurence Kirshbaum's position would expand to include "editorial leadership for the Seattle and New York adult imprints, as well as Amazon Children's Publishing." In addition, it was announced that Amazon would be opening a new European publishing division, which will focus on "expanding the English-language audience through its English-language bookstores in the U.K., Germany, France, Italy, and Spain." Vicky Griffith, formerly publisher of the Seattle imprints, will be the new EU publisher. In December 2012, Brilliance Audio, a division of Amazon, announced the creation of a publishing imprint called Grand Harbor Press which will focus on original self-help and inspirational hardcover, paperback and e-books.

In January 2013, Amazon announced two children's and young adult imprints. The first imprint is called Two Lions, featuring picture books, chapter books, and middle-grade fiction. The second imprint is called Skyscape, publishing fiction for young adults. In March, Amazon announced a New York-based literary fiction imprint that would publish novels, short stories and memoirs. Called Little A, it was initially overseen by senior editor Ed Park. Amazing Publishing launched its comic book and graphic novel imprint, Jet City Comics, on July 9. It will adapt existing books into comics for Kindle e-reader and print.

In October 2013, Amazon Publishing announced a new weekly digital literary magazine called Day One. The magazine focused on short fiction and poetry, including works from new authors and foreign authors in English translation. Each issue looked at one fiction writer and one poet each week, including a short story and poem with each issue. The issues were accessed through Kindle devices. Issues contained an introductory essay about a writer, author interviews, illustrations and playlists. The phrase "Day One" has often been used by Bezos in annual reports to shareholders as a way to experiment and fight complacency: "This is still Day 1."

In March, 2014, Amazon Publishing opened a German-language department based in Munich under the direction of publisher Sarah Tomashek. According to Amazon, the "European Amazon Publishing team will acquire German-language fiction for publication in Kindle and print editions available on Amazon websites."

In November, 2017, Amazon Publishing announced a new imprint Amazon Original Stories for works of fiction and non-fiction that can be read in a single sitting ranging from 5,000 to 20,000 words.

In February 2018, Amazon Publishing announced a new imprint Topple Books focused on revolutionary feminist voices with Joey Soloway as editor-at-large.

=== Weathervane ===
During the 1999 Christmas season, Amazon leased the rights to a defunct imprint called Weathervane. This was Amazon's first attempt at publishing. The titles included Christmas recipe books and others without much market appeal, they were the "creatures from the black lagoon of the remainder table" according to a former employee James Marcus. The imprint soon disappeared, and according to "representatives at [Amazon] today claim never to have heard of [Weathervane]."

=== Publishers ===
Larry Kirshbaum was the first publisher when Amazon Publishing was founded in 2009. He was based in New York City. In January 2014, Kirshbaum left the company. According to Publishers Weekly, "Under his direction, Amazon Publishing has had a difficult time gaining traction in the marketplace and failed to deliver any major bestsellers. In addition to the lackluster performance of the group, Kirshbaum drew unwanted attention in the summer of 2013 when a lawsuit was filed against him for sexual assault."

Kirshbaum was replaced by Daphne Durham who has spent her entire career at Amazon and is based in Seattle. Durham left the company a year later to "seek time off". Mikyla Bruder became the publisher on January 16, 2015, and was responsible for most of the imprints; she is based in Seattle. David Blum was named publisher and editor-in-chief of the Little A and Two Lions imprints; he is based in New York City.

=== Kindle Worlds ===
Kindle Worlds was established on May 22, 2013, as part of Amazon Publishing devoted to providing a commercial venue for fan fiction creations of specific licensed media properties. Amazon shut down Kindle Worlds in August 2018.

== Criticism ==
In a 2014 article in The New Yorker, George Packer writes that nearly all of Amazon Publishing's books had under-performed. For example, it purchased two high-profile books at auction, including Timothy Ferriss' The 4-Hour Chef for 1 million dollars, which did worse than his previous titles; and My Mother Was Nuts, a memoir by Penny Marshall, for eight-hundred thousand dollars, which only sold seventeen thousand copies. Actors Anonymous, a novel by James Franco, has sold fewer than five thousand copies. Packer says "In the past year [2012-2013], Amazon Publishing has barely been a presence at auctions, and several editors have departed; last month [January 2014], Kirshbaum left the company, having failed at the task Amazon gave him." Reasons given for the poor performance include bookstores refusing to carry Amazon titles since Amazon is a direct competitor; incompetence as a publisher (as one New York publisher said about Amazon, "There are certain things it takes to be a publisher. You have to have luck, but you also have to have judgment, discernment."); and Amazon's culture of machines, algorithms and mass products which do not fit well with the publishing world's emphasis on human networking and reputation.

== List of imprints ==
Amazon Publishing imprints
Imprint	Inaugural date	Description	Notes
AmazonEncore	May 2009	Previously out-of-print or self-published books	
AmazonCrossing	May 2010	Translated books	
Montlake Romance	May 2011	Romance	
Thomas & Mercer	May 2011	Mysteries and thrillers	
47North	October 2011	Science fiction, fantasy, horror	
The Domino Project	December 2010	Founded by Seth Godin; short books by "thought leaders"	A "Powered by Amazon" imprint. Godin decided to end the imprint in November 2011.
New Harvest	January 2012	General adult titles	Via Amazon Publishing's East Coast Group run by Larry Kirshbaum. New Harvest is distributed by Houghton Mifflin Harcourt.
Amazon Publishing		Nonfiction, memoirs, and general fiction	
Grand Harbor Press	December 2012	Spirituality and self-discovery	A division of Brilliance Audio, owned by Amazon
Amazon Children's Publishing	January 2013	Young adult and children's picture books	Composed of two imprints: Two Lions and Skyscape
Little A	March 2013	Literary fiction	
Jet City Comics	July 2013	Comic books and graphic novels	
Day One	October 2013	Weekly digital literary magazine	
Lake Union Publishing		Contemporary and historical fiction, memoir, and popular nonfiction	
StoryFront		Short fiction	
Waterfall Press		Christian nonfiction and fiction	
Kindle Press		Digital works in popular genres	
Original Stories	November 2017	Fiction and non-fiction pieces that can be read in a single sitting	
Westland Publishing India	2016	Non fiction	Amazon acquired Westland from the Tata Group in 2016, but ceased publishing in January 2022.
Topple Books	2018	Stories from nonbinary and queer authors	Curated by Joey Soloway
