= The 4-Hour Chef =

2012 book by Timothy Ferriss

The 4-Hour Chef: The Simple Path to Cooking Like a Pro, Learning Anything, and Living the Good Life
- Author: Timothy Ferriss
- Language: English
- Subject: Self-actualization, self-employment, self-improvement, cooking
- Genre: Non-fiction
- Published: 2012 (New Harvest)
- Publisher: Amazon Publishing
- Publication place: United States
- Media type: Print
- OCLC: 785865773
- Preceded by: The 4-Hour Workweek, The 4-Hour Body
- Followed by: Tools of Titans

The 4-Hour Chef: The Simple Path to Cooking Like a Pro, Learning Anything, and Living the Good Life is a self-help book by Timothy Ferriss, published on November 20, 2012. Like Ferriss' other "4-Hour" books, The 4-Hour Chef revolves around a theme of self-improvement; this time, through the lens of cooking.

== Synopsis ==
The 4-Hour Chef contains practical cooking and recipe tips and uses the skill of cooking to explain methods for accelerated learning. Recipes based on Ferriss' "Slow-Carb Diet" are included, and the book is presented as a practical guide to mastering cooking and food. Ferris presents these cooking techniques alongside his ideas on self-improvement and "meta-learning".

== Release and reception ==
The 4-Hour Chef premiered on the New York Times, Publishers Weekly and USA Today bestseller lists, and was a #1 Wall Street Journal bestseller.

Prior to the release of The 4-Hour Chef, the book was boycotted by a selection of brick and mortar bookstores, most notably Barnes & Noble, because the book was published by Amazon Publishing rather than a traditional publisher. This boycott led to Ferriss striking a handful of partnerships with non-conventional partners, including BitTorrent, Panera Bread, and TaskRabbit. In particular, Ferriss partnered with BitTorrent to distribute an exclusive bundle of 4-Hour Chef content including excerpts from the book, photos, interviews and unpublished content. The bundle was downloaded over 300,000 times the first week after release.

In the week of release, Ferriss orchestrated an extensive media campaign, one that USA Today described as an "online media onslaught." The campaign included an "All-You-Can-Eat" promotion assembled by Ferriss, which offered incentives for book pre-orders ranging from supplemental materials to keynote speeches by Ferriss. During the first week of publication, the book received coverage in outlets such as CBS, Wired Magazine, Outside Magazine, and Dr. Oz.

Reviewing for the Wall Street Journal, Aram Bakshiam Jr gave a mostly negative review, praising the book for describing the challenges and joys of cooking, but ultimately concluding it "lacks balance and coherence and has the feel of an overlong report produced by a committee." Kirkus Reviews was more positive, calling the book a "wildly inventive excursion through the creation of our daily bread."
