= Klüver =

Klüver or Kluver may refer to:

- Billy Klüver (1927–2004), American electrical engineer at Bell Telephone Laboratories who founded Experiments in Art and Technology
- Felipe Klüver (born 2000), Uruguayan rower
- Heinrich Klüver (1897–1979), German-American psychologist born in Holstein, Germany
- Johan Wilhelm Klüver (born 1910), Norwegian sailor who was highly decorated after the Second World War
- Cayla Kluver (born 1992), author of the Legacy series

== See also ==
- Klüver–Bucy syndrome, behavioral disorder named after Heinrich Klüver and Paul Bucy that occurs when both the right and left medial temporal lobes of the brain malfunction
