= Online assistant =

Online assistant may refer to:

- An automated online assistant
- A human virtual assistant
