= Jeff Ragsdale =

American author and filmmaker (1971–2023)

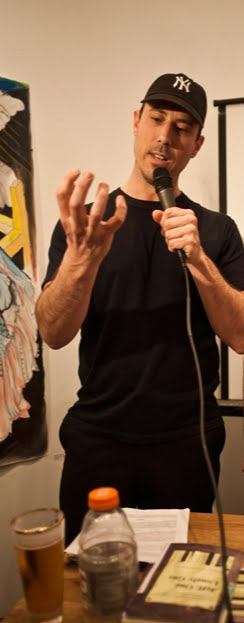
- Ragsdale in 2013
- Born: Jeffrey Charles Ragsdale; September 26, 1971; Bellingham, Washington, U.S.
- Died: September 22, 2023 (aged 51); Santa Monica, California, U.S.
- Education: University of Washington
- Occupations: Writer; actor; filmmaker
- Years active: 1999–2023
- Notable work: Jeff, One Lonely Guy, Hotline (2014 film), The Best American Nonrequired Reading, 30 Nights with a Call Girl
- Awards: 2012 GQ.com Book of the Year
- Website: twitter.com/jeff_ragsdale/

Jeffrey Charles Ragsdale (/ræɡsˈdeɪl/) (September 26, 1971 – September 22, 2023) was an American author, documentary filmmaker, actor and stand-up comedian. In 2011 he posted a flyer in New York City as a "social experiment", stating his phone number and asking people to call him, describing himself as "Jeff, one lonely guy". He was overwhelmed with thousands of calls after photos of the flyer were posted on the internet. The experience led to his 2012 book Jeff, One Lonely Guy, and indirectly to a 2013 pilot episode for a reality television show, Being Noticed, and a starring role in the 2014 documentary Hotline.

Jeff, One Lonely Guy was selected by Dave Eggers for inclusion in The Best American Nonrequired Reading 2012, and it was a GQ 2012 "Book of the Year".

== Early life ==
Ragsdale was born in Bellingham, Washington. He was the second of two children born to a Roman Catholic mother, Dolores, and father, Milton. His father was of Czechoslovak (paternal) and German (maternal) descent, while his mother was of Irish and German descent. His parents operated a real estate developing business in Whatcom County. As a child he won the Presidential Physical Fitness Award, signed by Ronald Reagan. Ragsdale attended Sehome High School and starred on the school's basketball team. During high school he lived with actor Jim Caviezel and his family for a period. Ragsdale was friends with actress Hilary Swank at Sehome High School. In 2000 Ragsdale received a Bachelor's degree in English from the University of Washington. He studied in the Columbia University MFA Writing Program in 2000. In 2001 and 2002 Ragsdale lived in Guadalajara, Mexico City, and San José del Cabo.

== "Jeff, one lonely guy" ==
In October 2011 Ragsdale posted a flyer in New York City as a social experiment. The flyer stated that he wanted to talk to people about anything, and listed his name as "Jeff, one lonely guy". Pictures of the flyer went viral after they were posted to the Internet, which resulted in Ragsdale receiving thousands of phone calls, texts, and voicemails from people from all over the world. This prompted him to collect several of the messages and conversations in a Postsecret-esque book, which he entitled Jeff, One Lonely Guy. Ragsdale compiled the messages into several themes, releasing the book on March 20, 2012. The book was well received by many news outlets and authors and was a GQ's 2012 "Book of the Year".

Critical reception for Jeff, One Lonely Guy was very positive. Bret Easton Ellis stated: "The symphony of voices here is an overwhelming reading experience. This short book is also a verification of a legitimate new form of narrative; it's the definitive document so far of where our medium is heading. I've never read anything like it." Ellis writes on Twitter: "The most powerful reading experience I've had in the last year is Jeff, One Lonely Guy by Jeff Ragsdale". He continues, "What I mean about a new art form: Jeff, One Lonely Guy by Jeff Ragsdale is really the first example of successful post-Empire reportage yet." Dave Eggers writes, "I love this—a great idea, and so deftly put together. A telling mosaic of modern loneliness and almost-connectedness." Poet and critic Nick Flynn asserts: "We have crossed over the threshold [with Ragsdale's new collage form], and are now—strangely, terrifyingly, beautifully—in this transformed world." Literary critic JW McCormack, writing for Bookforum, described it as "revolutionary".

Ragsdale's publicity tour for the book included interviews on NPR, 10-10 WINS, CBS's Man Cave, the podcast Other People with Brad Listi and by Nick Flynn.

In 2013 Ragsdale shot a pilot for a reality show, Being Noticed, which was produced by David Hurwitz (producer of Fear Factor and Million Second Quiz). The show was based on Ragsdale's social experiments and conceptual art projects. Ragsdale and Hurwitz wrote the script for the pilot together. The pilot was shot in Hollywood, Santa Monica, Venice Beach, Malibu, as well as various locations throughout Sherman Oaks. The cast and crew numbered in the dozens and the pilot was shot over the course of several weeks.

In 2013 New Museum in New York City launched a street exhibit inspired by Ragsdale's flyer. New Museum posted 5000 flyers around the city instructing people to call a phone number to connect.

Ragsdale starred in the 2014 documentary Hotline, directed by MTV producer Tony Shaff. Shaff and his film crew followed Ragsdale around New York City for weeks as Ragsdale worked his "Lonely Guy" hotline. Hotline premiered in Toronto at Hot Docs in April 2014, where it was an official selection and audience and jury favorite. Hotline won First Prize for Best Feature Documentary at the 2014 Rhode Island International Film Festival. It was also screened at the 2014 Brooklyn Film Festival.

In 2014 writer and journalist Amitava Kumar included portions of the book Jeff, One Lonely Guy in his book, A Matter of Rats: A Short Biography of Patna. Kumar previously interviewed Ragsdale and wrote about him in The New York Times.

== Other career ==
In 2009 Ragsdale competed on an episode of Whoopi Goldberg's Head Games, which he won.

Ragsdale's work has been featured in The New Yorker, The New York Times, New York Post, New York Magazine, The Daily Beast, CBS News, O, The Oprah Magazine, Huffington Post, BBC News, Glamour Magazine, The Examiner, The New York Observer, Seattle Post-Intelligencer, Daily Mail (UK), Capital New York, The Rumpus, The Millions, The Advocate, among others. The New York Times asserts that Ragsdale's "work sometimes involves blurring lines between reality and performance".

In 2011 Ragsdale published the book-length essay "Rage", which was run in The Seattle Review, and in 2012, he became a contributor to the online culture magazine The Nervous Breakdown.

Ragsdale appeared in a supporting role in the feature film Sister Italy in 2012.

During 2012 and 2013 Ragsdale lived in Canada and produced, shot and edited an "immersion documentary" in which he accompanied Canadian sex workers on hundreds of calls over a span of months.

On May 17, 2015 Ragsdale appeared on the most popular Australian talk show, Sunrise. Ragsdale made a documentary of the events leading up to the interview, titled Behind the Glitter.

== Personal life and activism ==
Ragsdale was an activist, participating in and organizing several protests and demonstrations for causes, one of which was prompted by the murder of Imette St. Guillen. The resulting protest, organized by Ragsdale, helped contribute to the closing of The Falls bar in New York City.

Jeffrey died from cancer on September 22, 2023, at the age of 51. At the time of his death, he was residing in Santa Monica, California.

== Filmography ==
Film & Television
Year	Title	Role	Notes
2015	Behind the Glitter	Director, writer	Shot in Los Angeles, California. Documentary.
2015	Sunrise	Himself	TV Series (episode: "Episode dated 17 May 2015" - aired May 17, 2015)
2014	Good Morning America	Himself	TV Series (episode: "Episode dated 18 March 2014" - aired May 18, 2014)
2014	Hotline	Himself	Feature-length award-winning documentary
2014	Being Noticed	Himself	Reality show pilot, co-creator with David Hurwitz (producer of Fear Factor, The Million Second Quiz)
2013	30 Nights with a Call Girl	Director, writer	Shot in Alberta, Canada
2013	Interviews at a Bordello	Director, writer	Shot in Alberta, Canada
2013	Sister Italy	Dr. Gerodi	Feature film
2012	Inside Edition	Himself	TV Series (episode: "Episode dated 19 July 2012" - aired July 19, 2012)
2012	The Jeff Probst Show	Himself	TV Series (episode: "The Loneliest Guy in America" - aired September 19, 2012)
2012	CBS News Sunday Morning	Himself	TV Series (2 episodes: "Episode dated 13 May 2012" - aired May 13, 2012 & "Episode dated 5 August 2012" - aired August 5, 2012)
2012	Channel One (Russia)	Himself	TV Series (episode: "Episode dated 21 March 2012" - aired March 21, 2012)
2012	FOX	Himself	TV Series (episode: "Episode dated 25 July 2011" - with Joyce DeWitt - aired March 22, 2012)
2012	Lorraine (TV programme)	Himself	TV Series (episode: "Episode dated 18 June 2012" - aired June 18, 2012)
2012	BBC World News	Himself	TV Series (episode: "Episode dated 28 December 2012" - aired December 28, 2012)
2012	CTV National News	Himself	TV Series (episode: "You Could Sing the Anthem at a Leafs Game" aired September 13, 2012)
2012	Sistema Brasileiro de Televisão	Himself	TV Series (episode: "Episode dated 24 March 2012" - aired March 24, 2012)
2012	Yahoo!	Himself	Web Series by Yahoo! "Broken News Daily" (episode: "Jeff Ragsdale" - aired September 13, 2012)
2010	Last Comic Standing	Himself	TV Series (episode: "Episode #7.4" - aired June 21, 2010)
2010	Head Games (game show)	Himself	TV Series (episode: "Episode #1.1" - aired October 11, 2009)
2010	The Early Show	Himself	TV Series (episode: "Mending a Relationship Hurt by Jealousy" - aired February 25, 2010)
2009	NY1	Himself	TV Series (episode: "Episode dated 16 August 2009" - aired August 16, 2009)
2009	The Morning Show with Mike & Juliet	Himself	TV Series (episode: "Ask the Experts: Friends and Foes" - aired March 2, 2009)
2009	Chronicles of the Beyond	Det. Brogan	Feature film
2009	Death Daily	Friend	Short film
2009	Legalized Mafia	J.R.	Short film
2009	Ironic Odyssey	Joe	Feature film
2009	Married Life	Sol	Short film
2009	Group Therapy With Dr. Paul Jacoby	Paul Jacoby	Short film
2009	Throttle	Andy	Short film
2009	The Homeowner	Pete Reynolds	Short film
2006	At Large with Geraldo Rivera	Himself	TV Series (episode: "Mummy Murder Mystery" - aired March 13, 2006)
2006	Catherine Crier Live	Himself	TV Series (episode: "Match in Imette Case" - aired March 13, 2006)
2006	WPIX	Himself	TV Series (2 episodes: "Episode dated 16 March 2006" - aired March 16, 2006 & "Episode dated April 18 April" - aired April 18, 2006)
2006	WCBS-TV	Himself	TV Series (episode: "Episode dated 29 November 2006" - aired November 29, 2006)
2006	WBZ-TV	Himself	TV Series (episode: "Episode dated 1 December 2006" - aired December 1, 2006)

== Commercials ==
Commercials
Year	Title	Role	Notes
2010	Old Spice	Lead actor	Commercial for Old Spice luffa bathroom sponge
2010	Mercedes-Benz	Lead actor	Industrial commercial shot at Mercedes-Benz of Manhattan
2010	Catholic	Lead actor	Catholic Diocese promoting safe sex virtues
2009	The Art of Fong	Lead actor	Web Commercial for Fong equipment
