= Larry Kirshbaum =

- Born: 1944 (age 81–82)
- Education: University of Michigan
- Occupation: Book publisher
- Known for: Chief of publishing at Amazon.com
- Spouse: Barbara Feder
- Children: 2

Laurence "Larry" Kirshbaum is the former chief of publishing for Amazon Publishing.

== Biography ==
Born to a Jewish family in Chicago in 1944 and raised in the Lincoln Park neighborhood. In 1966, Kirshbaum graduated with a B.A. from the University of Michigan. After school, he worked for Newsweek. In 1970, he co-wrote a book with Roger Rapoport about student protests, Is the Library Burning? In 1970, he accepted a job as a salesman for Random House selling to drugstores, small groceries, and gift shops. In 1974, he went to work for Warner Books where he became a publisher in 1985, working with Jack Welch and Michael Eisner on their memoirs. He then became CEO of the Time Warner Book Group. In 2005, he left Time Warner to found his own literary agency. In 2011, he went to work as the chief of publishing for Amazon Publishing; which was striving to build its own publishing business. He signed numerous authors including actress and director Penny Marshall and best-selling writer Timothy Ferris. In 2012, his efforts were crushed after bookseller Barnes & Noble stated that it would not sell books published by Amazon in its stores. In October 2013, it was announced that he was leaving Amazon and will be replaced by Daphne Durham.

== Personal life ==
He is married to the former Barbara Feder of Highland Park, Illinois; they have two children.

In 2013, he was accused of sexually assaulting a woman. Catherine Redlich, Kirshbaum's attorney, stated that the incident was a "consensual relationship from a decade ago which turned sour".
