= Legacy (novel series) =

Novel series

- 2011 Harlequin cover of Legacy
- Legacy, Allegiance, Sacrifice
- Author: Cayla Kluver
- Country: United States
- Language: English
- Genre: Young adult novel
- Publisher: Forsooth Books, Harlequin Teen, AmazonEncore
- Published: 2008, (Forsooth Books); 2009, (AmazonEncore), 2011 - 2012 (Harlequin Enterprises)
- Media type: Print, e-book

Legacy is a series of novels by Cayla Kluver that follow a young princess that must decide between a forbidden love and her obligations to her kingdom. Kluver first began writing the series around the mid-2000s and finished her first rough draft of Legacy at the age of fourteen.

Kluver initially self-published the first volume in the series with the help of her parents, but was later re-released by AmazonEncore in 2008. AmazonEncore passed on further volumes in the series, with Harlequin Teen purchasing the rights to the entire trilogy and releasing the series between 2011 and 2012. Book rights have been sold to over fifteen countries.

== Plot ==
=== Legacy ===
Legacy follows Princess Alera of Hytanica, a willful young woman that cringes at the idea of marrying over bearing Steldor, her father's chosen suitor. Assuming that she will spend her days with a man that she's attracted to, yet does not actually love, Alera finds herself almost instantly drawn to a youthful intruder. Narian is initially captured by the palace guards as a spy from an enemy kingdom, but is eventually discovered to be the son of a noble family that was long since thought to be dead. Alera begins to secretly meet with Narian, who tells her of life in the other kingdom and the two begin to fall in love. Despite this, Alera is forced to marry Steldor while Narian is condemned as a traitor.

=== Allegiance ===
Allegiance finds Alera as Queen of Hytanica, married to Steldor. She finds herself unable to love him and equally unable to forget Narian, the one she truly loves. This provokes conflicted emotions in her, as she knows that Narian is destined to conquer her kingdom for the magic user Overlord, the ruler of the rival kingdom of Cokyria. Alera initially refuses to believe that Narian could be capable of these actions until she discovers him leading Cokyrian troops in an attack against the city. Despite her heartbreak, Alera must find a way to lead her kingdom to more hopeful times.

=== Sacrifice ===
Sacrifice is told through the dual perspectives of Alera, the fallen Queen of a conquered kingdom, and Shaselle, a rebel whose father was murdered. Alera must not only rebuild her kingdom under the rule of Cokyria, but she must also find a way to rebuild the spirit and pride of her people. Meanwhile, Shaselle seeks to shirk her duties as a Lady in favor of achieving her revenge against those responsible for her father's death. Both women are faced with the choice of love or country, a choice that might lead to painful repercussions.

== Reception ==
Critical reception for the series has been mostly positive. RT Book Reviews has praised the trilogy as a whole, giving the final volume four and a half stars and marking it as a "top pick". Kirkus Review's opinion of the series is predominantly positive, with the site stating that while Allegiance was "formulaic" the final volume "rises above genre by including thought-provoking elements that examine the role of women, family allegiances and the damaging nature of prejudice".
