= Carter Manny =

American architect

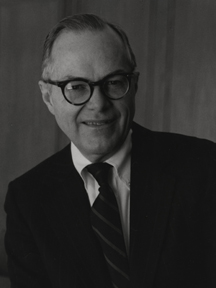
- Carter Manny
- Born: November 16, 1918; Michigan City, Indiana, US.
- Died: February 1, 2017 (aged 98); San Rafael, California, US.
- Occupation: Architect
- Parent(s): Carter H. Ada Barnes Manny
- Practice: Associated architectural firm[s]
- Buildings: Chicago O'Hare International Airport; the FBI Building in Washington, D.C.; the First National Bank of Chicago

Carter Hugh Manny Jr. (November 16, 1918 – February 1, 2017 in San Rafael, California) was an American architect and foundation administrator who studied architecture under Frank Lloyd Wright and Mies van der Rohe and spent his career in Chicago. His work helped shape the Chicago O'Hare International Airport, the FBI Building in Washington, D.C., the First National Bank of Chicago, and the addition to the Chicago Board of Trade.

== Education ==
Carter Manny in San Rafael, CA in 2006

Carter Hugh Manny Jr. was born in Michigan City, Indiana, on November 16, 1918, to Carter H. and Ada Barnes Manny. After attending public schools in Michigan City, he went on to Harvard where he was elected a member of Phi Beta Kappa and graduated magna cum laude in 1941. During his last year as an undergraduate, Manny began his architectural studies at the Graduate School of Design under Walter Gropius and Marcel Breuer. With war clouds gathering in mid-1941, he shifted to a special war production program at the Harvard Business School where he obtained a degree in Industrial Administration in 1942. During WWII he worked for a division of the War Production Board at Wright Field in Dayton, Ohio.

== Architectural career ==
After the war Manny returned to architectural studies, first with a brief stint as an apprentice of Frank Lloyd Wright at Taliesin and then with two years under Mies van der Rohe at the Illinois Institute of Technology in Chicago. Following graduation from IIT in 1948 he began architectural practice with the Chicago firm of Naess & Murphy, becoming a partner in 1957. He spent his entire professional career with this firm and its two successors, C.F. Murphy Associates and Murphy/Jahn, until he retired at the end of 1983.

Among the major projects in which he led the team of architects are Chicago O'Hare International Airport (an unusually long assignment that lasted off and on for 27 years until his retirement), the FBI Building in Washington, D.C., the First National Bank of Chicago, and the addition to the Chicago Board of Trade.

== Graham Foundation ==
In addition to his architectural practice, Carter Manny is widely known for his work over many years with the Graham Foundation of Chicago. The foundation is internationally recognized for its support of educational activities in architecture and in related fields of the fine arts.

Manny served as a trustee of the foundation for several years after its formation in 1956 and later became its director, serving in this capacity for 22 years until his retirement in December 1993. He is credited with shaping many of the policies of this institution and with guiding it through a perilous period in the 1980s when the foundation's continued existence was seriously threatened. Following his retirement the foundation's trustees created a special grant in his honor to be awarded annually to a doctoral candidate in architectural history.

In the early 1990s Carter Manny was the subject of a lengthy oral history taken by the noted art and architecture critic, Franz Schulze, as part of a series on Chicago architects for the Art Institute of Chicago. It is now hosted online by the Art Institute, as is his childhood memoir: A Boyhood Revisited: 1918–1937. The Carter H. Manny, Jr. Papers, a collection of archival materials, is held by the Ryerson & Burnham Libraries at the Art Institute of Chicago.

== Associations ==
Manny was a fellow of the American Institute of Architects and of the Illinois Society of Architects. He was a past president of the Chicago Chapter of AIA, a past director of the Society of Architectural Historians and is a Fellow of the Society. He also served on the advisory committee of both the Art Institute of Chicago and Illinois Institute of Technology. He was a member of the Tavern Club while living in Chicago and Michigan City as well as the Cliff Dwellers Club and the Arts Club.

== Family ==
In 1942 he married Mary Alice Kellett who died in 1994. There were two children from this marriage, Elizabeth Manny and Carter H. Manny III, as well as a grandson William Manny. In 1995 Carter Manny married Maya Moran an artist and writer, of which he shared four step-children. He resided in California.
