= The 4-Hour Body =

2010 book by Timothy Ferriss

The 4-Hour Body: An Uncommon Guide to Rapid Fat-Loss, Incredible Sex, and Becoming Superhuman
- Cover
- Author: Timothy Ferriss
- Language: English
- Subject: Health & fitness, weight loss, diet, self-help
- Genre: Non-fiction
- Published: 2010 (Crown Publishing Group)
- Publication place: United States
- Media type: Print
- Pages: 592 pp
- ISBN: 978-0-307-46363-0
- Preceded by: The 4-Hour Workweek
- Followed by: The 4-Hour Chef

The 4-Hour Body: An Uncommon Guide to Rapid Fat-Loss, Incredible Sex, and Becoming Superhuman is a nonfiction book by American writer Timothy Ferriss. It was published by Crown Publishing Group in 2010.

It focuses on diet, with chapters on exercise, sleep, and sexual performance. It debuted at number one on the New York Times Bestseller List and spent three weeks in the top three. The book elicited some controversy for its claims.

== Book ==
The book advocates what Ferriss calls a "Slow-carb Diet", which imposes three cardinal strictures: eat a very simple set of meals repeatedly; focus on "slow carbs"; and allow one "cheat day" a week when all foods are allowed. The diet prohibits starches and all things sweet (including fruit and all artificial sweeteners), with strong preferences for lean protein and a few specific vegetables.

The Dietary Guidelines for Americans do not specifically address the "Slow-carb Diet".

== Reception ==
A review of The 4-Hour Body in WebMD was skeptical of the diet, quoting Barry Sears (creator of the Zone diet): "Skip the 4-hour body and opt for a 24-hour-365-day-a-year body, because you need a plan that makes sense that you can live with." In the same article, Michael Aziz (creator of the Perfect 10 Diet) claims the cheat day is "dangerous". On the other hand, the review praises the avoidance of "white" carbohydrates and the recommendation to eat the same few meals repeatedly.

The Harvard Business Review quoted Dr. Tieraona Low Dog: "many people will lose weight if they follow it, though I don't think that the diet is capable of all the claims in the book." Low Dog also warns about "the very limited number of vegetables to choose from," though in fact apart from starchy vegetables such as potatoes the Slow-carb Diet allows free choice in vegetables.

U.S. News quoted Scott Kahan (codirector of the George Washington University Weight Management Program) describing it "as another cockamamie fad diet" and expressing doubts about its sustainability.

The New York Times review stated "it's among the craziest, most breathless things I've ever read, and I've read Klaus Kinski, Dan Brown and Snooki."

== Marketing and sales ==
As part of the press for the book, Ferriss appeared as a guest on The Dr. Oz Show and ABC's The View.

Ferris describes a detailed marketing plan for promoting the book, including trailers, aggressively seeking out fitness and exercise bloggers and influencers, and prizes for readers who bought The 4-Hour Body package deals.

The 4-Hour Body debuted at number one on the New York Times Bestseller List and spent three weeks in the top three. It peaked at number four on both the Wall Street Journal and USA Today's lists, and was one of Amazon.com's top 5 bestselling books for December 2010 and January 2011.

== See also ==
- Atkins diet
- List of diets
- Low-carbohydrate diet
- Low-glycemic diet
- Paleolithic diet
