= Tools of Titans =

2016 self-help book by Timothy Ferriss

Tools of Titans: The Tactics, Routines, and Habits of Billionaires, Icons, and World-Class Performers
- First edition
- Author: Timothy Ferriss
- Published: 2016 (Houghton Mifflin Harcourt)
- Publication place: United States
- Pages: 736
- ISBN: 978-1328683786
- Website: toolsoftitans.com

Tools of Titans: The Tactics, Routines, and Habits of Billionaires, Icons, and World-Class Performers (2016) is a self-help book by Timothy Ferriss, an American entrepreneur. For the book, he interviewed more than one hundred "world-class performers" from diverse fields to solicit their advice about how to be successful. The book debuted as a #1 New York Times bestseller.

Arnold Schwarzenegger wrote the foreword.

== Content ==
Ferriss noticed patterns in the successful people he interviewed, including:

- 80% engaged in meditation or mindfulness activities daily
- A number of males over 45 either never ate breakfast, or ate it lightly.
- Many used the Chilipad, a sleep-aid device.
- Many enjoyed the books Sapiens, Poor Charlie's Almanack, Influence, Man's Search for Meaning.
- Many listened to single songs on repeat for focus.
- Many did a form of "spec" work (completing projects on their own time and at their own expense, then submitting them to prospective buyers)
- Many believed that "failure is not durable".
- They often turned weaknesses into advantages.

== Critical reception ==
According to Publishers Weekly, in the week covered by its December 19, 2016 bestseller report, Tools of Titans ranked No. 2 in hardcover nonfiction and No. 6 overall, with 62,938 copies sold as measured by Nielsen BookScan.

In a 2017 review for The Cut, Stella Bugbee wrote that she had become "engrossed in a book about lifehacking" that she could not "extricate" herself from, while also calling the book her "nightmare" and writing that "every page brims with the contagious mania of tech-bro self-improvement."
