= Virtual assistant (occupation) =

A virtual assistant (typically abbreviated to VA, also called a virtual office assistant) is generally self-employed and provides professional administrative, technical, or creative (social) assistance to clients remotely from a home office. Because virtual assistants are independent contractors rather than employees, clients are not responsible for any employee-related taxes, insurance, or benefits, except in the context that those indirect expenses are included in the VA's fees. Clients also avoid the logistical problem of providing extra office space, equipment, or supplies. Clients pay for 100% productive work and can work with virtual assistants, individually, or in multi-VA firms to meet their exact needs. Virtual assistants usually work for other small businesses but can also support busy executives. It is estimated that there are as few as 5,000 to 10,000 or as many as 25,000 virtual assistants worldwide. The profession is growing in centralized economies with "fly-in fly-out" staffing practices.

== Pay and salary ==
In terms of pay, according to Glassdoor, the annual salary for virtual assistants in the US is $35,922. However, worldwide, many virtual assistants work as freelancers on an hourly wage. One recent survey involving 400 virtual assistants on the popular freelancer site Upwork shows a huge discrepancy in hourly pay commanded by virtual assistants in different countries.

== Modes of communication ==
Common modes of communication and data delivery include the internet, e-mail and phone-call conferences, online workspaces, and fax machine. Increasingly, virtual assistants are utilizing technology such as Skype and Zoom, Slack, as well as Google Voice. Professionals in this business work on a contractual basis, and long-lasting cooperation is standard. Typically, office administrative experience is expected in positions such as executive assistant, office manager/supervisor, secretary, legal assistant, paralegal, legal secretary, real estate assistant, and information technology.

In recent years, virtual assistants have also worked their way into many mainstream businesses, and with the advent of VOIP services such as Skype and Zoom, it has been possible to have a virtual assistant who can answer phone calls remotely, without the end user's knowledge. This allows businesses to add a personal touch in the form of a receptionist, without the additional cost of hiring someone.

== Types ==
Virtual assistants consist of individuals as well as companies who work remotely as independent professionals, providing a wide range of products and services, both to businesses and consumers. Virtual assistants perform many different roles, including typical secretarial work, website editing, social media marketing, customer service, data entry, accounts (MYOB, Quick books), and many other remote tasks.

Virtual assistants come from a variety of business backgrounds, but most have several years' experience earned in the "real" (non-virtual) business world, or several years' experience working online or remotely.

== Dedicated virtual assistants ==
A dedicated virtual assistant is someone working in the office under the management of a company. The facility and internet connection as well as training are provided by the company, though not in all cases. The home-based virtual assistant works either in an office sharing environment or from home. General VAs are sometimes called an online administrative assistant, online personal assistant, or online sales assistant. A virtual webmaster assistant, virtual marketing assistant, and virtual content writing assistant are specific professionals that are usually experienced employees from corporate environments who have set up their own virtual offices.

== In popular culture ==
Virtual assistants were an integral part of the 2007 bestselling book The 4-Hour Workweek by Tim Ferriss. Ferriss claimed to have hired virtual assistants to check his email, pay his bills, and run parts of his company.

== See also ==
- Crowdsourcing
- Virtual volunteering
- Virtual office
- Virtual team
