= Hotline (2014 film) =

- Directed by: Tony Shaff
- Written by: Tony Shaff
- Produced by: Tony Shaff, Bryce Renninger, Lauren Belfer
- Starring: Jeff Ragsdale, Miss Cleo, Jamie Blaine, and Tonya Jone Miller
- Cinematography: Tony Shaff, Lauren Belfer
- Edited by: Charlie Dugan
- Music by: Jess Stroup
- Distributed by: Gravitas Ventures
- Release date: April 28, 2014 (Hot Docs)
- Running time: 82 minutes
- Country: United States
- Language: English

Hotline is a 2014 documentary feature film written and directed by Tony Shaff. The film explores the intense connections that are made between strangers over the telephone, and explores these anonymous conversations people are often too hesitant to have with the people closest to them. The film stars Miss Cleo, Jeff Ragsdale, Jamie Blaine, and Tonya Jone Miller.

The film was first shown in Toronto at Hot Docs in April 2014, where it was an official selection and audience and jury favorite. On August 9, 2014 Hotline won First Prize for Best Feature Documentary at the Rhode Island International Film Festival. On May 9, 2014, the Brooklyn Film Festival announced that Hotline had been selected for inclusion in its prestigious feature film line-up.

== Synopsis ==
Hotline explores telephone hotlines throughout the United States. Among those profiled Brad Becker of the GLBT Hotline, Youree Dell Harris (aka Miss Cleo, formerly of the Psychic Readers Network), and the Homework Hotline in Nashville. Additionally, the telephone volunteers at the Anti-Violence Project are profiled, as are Alan Ross of the Samaritans in New York, crisis counselor Jamie Blaine of Nashville, Pastor Brent Furlong of Go Time Ministries in Pennsylvania, and Tonya Jone Miller of the Bay City Blues sex-line in Portland, Oregon. Another telephone sex worker known only as Gypsy is seen, as is Jeff Ragsdale, the eponymous Jeff, One Lonely Guy hotline out of New York.

== Production ==
Shaff, a former telephone psychic and suicide prevention hotline volunteer as well as reality television producer and director, shot the film at various locations across the United States. In post-production, Shaff worked with both the film's composer, Jess Stroup, and the film's editor, Charlie Dugan, on a score which utilized an analog dial tone theme. "The jumping off point for working on the score for Hotline came after I listened to a Radiolab piece about phone phreaking that featured a blind boy with a difficult school and home life who said that he found comfort in the sound of a telephone dial tone," Shaff explains. Shaff used the crowd source funding website, Kickstarter, to finance portions of the project.

== Release and distribution ==
Hotline screened at IFC Center on November 17, 2014, as part of DOC NYC festival. Gravitas Ventures released the film in select theaters and on iTunes and VOD on November 18, 2014.

== Awards ==
On August 9, 2014, Hotline won First Prize for Best Feature Documentary at the Rhode Island International Film Festival.
