= Miss Cleo =

American TV personality (1962–2016)

- Miss Cleo on The Jenny Jones Show
- Born: Youree Dell Harris; August 12, 1962; Los Angeles, California, U.S.
- Died: July 26, 2016 (aged 53); Palm Beach, Florida, U.S.
- Other names: Cleomili Harris; Youree Perris
- Occupations: Television personality; actress
- Known for: Phone/TV psychic
- Children: 2

Youree Dell Harris (August 12, 1962 – July 26, 2016) was an American television personality and actress best known for portraying Miss Cleo, a spokeswoman for the psychic pay-per-call-minute service Psychic Readers Network, in a series of television commercials that aired from 1997 to 2003. Harris used various aliases, including Ree Perris, Youree Cleomili, Youree Perris, Rae Dell Harris, Cleomili Perris Youree, and Cleomili Harris.

== Early life ==
Youree Harris was born on August 12, 1962, at Los Angeles County Hospital to Alisa Teresa Hopis and David Harris, and raised in a Catholic Afro-Caribbean family. She attended, as a boarder, Ramona Convent Secondary School, a Catholic girls' school in Alhambra, California.

The Seattle Post-Intelligencer's Dorothy Parvaz reported that University of Southern California found no records that Harris had enrolled for four classes in 1980, as reported by People magazine.

== Career ==
=== Seattle ===
In 1996, Harris as "Ree Perris", wrote a play entitled For Women Only, playing a Jamaican woman named "Cleo", in Seattle.

In 1997, Harris as "Ree Perris", produced and performed two plays with the Langston Hughes Performing Arts Center in Seattle, Summer Rhapsody and Supper Club Cafe.

Her last project, Supper Club Cafe in 1997, was not successful, and she "left town with a trail of debts and broken promises", according to the Seattle Post-Intelligencer. Some of the cast of her productions claimed that they were never paid, and that Harris "told her cast members she had bone cancer" and "her medical costs would prevent her from paying people immediately", but she wrote each actor and crew member a letter telling him or her how much money she owed them.

=== Psychic Readers Network ===
In January 1993, Steven Feder and Peter Stolz (sometimes spelled: Stotz Stoltz Stolz) started Psychic Advisors Network, launched to compete with Psychic Friends Network using Philip Michael Thomas, Billy Dee Williams and Catherine Oxenberg.

In 1997, Harris moved to Florida, met Steven Feder and Peter Stolz, Fort Lauderdale cousins behind Access Resource Services, doing business as Psychic Readers Network and took a call-taker job as reader No. 16153. Harris was using the Jamaican accent when she moved to Florida and began working as a tarot-reading psychic for a telemarketing center. Harris was approached by Access Resource Services while working at an event in a Pompano Beach, Florida, mall and agreed to appear in an ad in 2000. As one employee of the Psychic Readers Network was told during training:

"the whole point was two things: keeping people on the phone as long as possible...and...telling people what they wanted to hear"

In the late 1990s, Harris began work for the Psychic Readers Network under the name Cleo. She appeared as a television infomercial psychic in which she claimed to be a shaman from Jamaica. Her employers' website also stated that Harris had been born in Trelawny, Jamaica, and grown up there.

The network used the title "Miss Cleo" and sent unsolicited emails, some of which stated, "[Miss Cleo has] been authorized to issue you a Special Tarot Reading!... it is vital that you call immediately!" Charges of deceptive advertising and of fraud on the part of the network began to surface around this time. Among the complaints were allegations that calls to Miss Cleo were answered by her "associates" who were actors reading from scripts, and that calls promoted as "free" were in fact charged for.

A tie-in book, Keepin' It Real: A Practical Guide for Spiritual Living appeared in 2001. Its authorship was attributed to Miss Cleo.

In 2001, Access Resource Services, doing business as Psychic Readers Network, was sued in various lawsuits originating in multiple jurisdictions, including Arkansas, Illinois, Indiana, Kansas, Missouri, New York, Oklahoma, Pennsylvania, Wisconsin, Florida and the Federal Communications Commission.

In 2002, the Federal Trade Commission charged the company's owners and Harris' promoters, Steven Feder and Peter Stolz, with deceptive advertising, billing, and collection practices; Harris was not indicted. The network had billed its victims for an estimated $1 billion. Her promoters agreed to settle by paying a $5 million fine to the Federal Trade Commission, as well debt forgiveness to callers which came to $500 million and returning any uncashed checks that had been sent by callers. It emerged during a lawsuit in Florida that Harris had been born in Los Angeles, and that her parents were American citizens.

The state of Florida also sued Harris under a provision of the law that allowed spokespeople to be held liable. Dave Aronberg of the Florida Attorney General’s Office led the state’s case against her. His successor dropped the charges.

=== After Psychic Readers Network ===
On July 11, 2001, Harris started a company, Waghwaan Entertainment.

Harris voiced the character of Auntie Poulet in the 2002 video game Grand Theft Auto: Vice City.

In 2003, the New York Daily News reported that TV music network Fuse had signed Harris as a spokeswoman. In early 2005, Harris was reportedly appearing on television as Miss Cleo in advertisements for a used car dealership in Florida, according to the Broward-Palm Beach New Times.

Harris offered "readings", priced from $75 to $250, and "weddings", priced from $350 and up. Harris had a podcast.

In September 2007, Harris released a spoken-word CD, Convicted for My Beliefs.

Under the name Cleomili Harris she spoke, from Toronto, about her experiences at the Psychic Readers Network in the 2014 documentary Hotline, which focuses on the history of telephone hotlines.

== Psychic Readers Network's "Miss Cleo" lawsuits ==
In 2015, as Miss Cleo, Harris appeared in a series of advertisements for the General Mills breakfast cereal French Toast Crunch. The Psychic Readers Network sued on the basis that they owned the character of Miss Cleo. The advertisements were discontinued.

The Psychic Readers Network sued Benefit Cosmetics, a Louis Vuitton Moet Hennessey subsidiary, for using Harris as "Miss Cleo" in a makeup commercial, as the persona's owner.

== Personal life and death ==
Harris married at age 19, gave birth to a daughter, and divorced at age 21. She had a second daughter while in her late 20s. In 2006, she came out as a lesbian.

Harris developed colorectal cancer, which metastasized. She died under hospice care in Palm Beach, Florida, on July 26, 2016, at the age of 53.

== In film ==
In December 2022, HBO Max released a feature documentary about Harris' life titled Call Me Miss Cleo.

On August 10, 2024, Lifetime Movie Network released the television film Miss Cleo: Her Rise and Fall, starring The Lady of Rage as Harris.
