= The Tim Ferriss Show =

Podcast by Tim Ferriss

- Genre: Talk
- Format: Audio ∙ video
- Country of origin: United States
- Language: English

Cast and voices
- Hosted by: Tim Ferriss

Production
- Length: 1 – 2+ hours

Technical specifications
- Video format: YouTube
- Audio format: Spotify , Apple Podcasts

Publication
- No. of episodes: 750+
- Original release: 2014 – present

Reception
- Cited for: 3 times for Best of Apple Podcasts

Related
- Website: tim.blog/podcast/

The Tim Ferriss Show is a podcast hosted by American author, entrepreneur, and philanthropist Tim Ferriss.

== History ==
The Tim Ferriss Show was launched in 2014. It features weekly interviews with successful people who share how they've achieved success in their profession. After the initial failure of his TV series and the stress of trying to get his recently published book distributed, Ferriss decided to start the podcast as a side project.

In 2016, the show reached 70 million downloads. According to the Journal of Business Communication, the show reached about one billion downloads in 2024.

== Format ==
The Tim Ferriss Show features long-form interviews of a variety of guests.

Ferriss asks questions designed to explore the everyday routines of high-achieving performers in order to understand the methods behind their accomplishments.

== Reception ==
Ferriss has been described as the "Oprah of Audio" for his podcast. The term "Tim Ferriss Effect" has been used to explain how a product mention on the podcast can increase sales.

In 2016, the Wall Street Journal included The Tim Ferriss Show as one of the Best Podcasts for Self-Improvement.
