= Chilipad =

Temperature-regulating sleep system

- Type: Temperature-regulating sleep system
- Inception: 2014
- Manufacturer: Sleep Solutions Inc.
- Available: yes
- Models: Chilipad Cube, Chilipad 1.0, Chilipad 2.0
- Website: sleep.me

Chilipad is a temperature-regulating cooling mattress topper developed by Sleepme, a brand of Sleep Solutions Inc. whose main operations are in Mooresville, North Carolina. It controls bed temperature through water-based cooling and heating mattress toppers, offering adjustable climate settings for individual users.

== History ==
The Chilipad was developed between 2005 and 2007 by Dr Tara Youngblood and Todd Youngblood in Mooresville, North Carolina. Sleepme Inc., the company behind Chilipad, was previously known as Chili Technology, LLC, Kryo Inc. and Sleepme Inc eventually acquired Sleep Solutions Inc.

In 2007 Chilipad PLS was launched. The original Chilipad was introduced as one of the first temperature control sleep systems, with the ability to cool or warm beds through a water circulation system. It gained popularity among athletes, biohackers, and individuals struggling with temperature-related sleep issues. The ChiliPad Cube was introduced in 2014. The OOLER Sleep System was introduced in 2019, featuring a companion mobile app. It was followed by the launch of Chilipad Dock Pro in 2022. The Dock Pro model was quieter, colder, and allowed customers to optionally use Wi-Fi to connect to the companion app. Also in 2022, Sleep Tracker by Sleepme was launched. In July 2023, Sleep Solutions Inc. acquired the assets of Sleepme Inc. Sleep Solutions Inc. subsequently continued the Chilipad product line.

In May 2026 a redesigned system Chilipad 2.0 was released. The Dock Pro was renamed the Chilipad 1.0 and remained available alongside the new model.

== Reviews ==
Chilipad received coverage from various publications, with reviews highlighting effectiveness in temperature regulation.

In 2022, the Chilipad Dock Pro was included in TIME's Best Inventions list.

The product also won recognition in the Men's Health Sleep Awards within the sleep tech category.

GQ magazine named the Chilipad Dock Pro as the "Most Versatile Cooling Mattress Cover" in its 2024 roundup.

In 2024 Woman's World awarded the Chilipad Cube the 50 Over 50 Award in 2024: The Best Products for Women Embracing Life Over 50.

The New York Times' Wirecutter reviewed the Chilipad Cube and Dock Pro, describing them as effective products for night sweats and temperature regulation.

The Spruce reviewed the Chilipad Cube Sleep System and noted its suitability for couples, highlighting its dual-zone temperature control, which allows each partner to set their preferred sleep temperature.

== Overview ==
The Chilipad consists of a mattress pad embedded with water channels, connected to an external control unit. This unit circulates water through the pad, allowing it to set the preferred sleeping temperature. The bed cooling system provides temperature regulation from 55°F to 115°F (13°C to 46°C). Chilipad has several temperature-regulating sleep systems that use active cooling and heating, allowing users to manage the sleep environment.

Pads are produced in single-zone and dual-zone configurations. A dual-zone setup uses two independent control units, allowing each side of the bed to be set to a different temperature. Temperature settings can be adjusted directly on the dock or through a companion mobile app.

The system uses distilled water, the reservoir must be topped up periodically, a cleaning solution is run through the circuit monthly to limit microbial growth, and the system is flushed approximately twice a year.

=== Chilipad 1.0 ===
The Chilipad 1.0, formerly known as the Chilipad Dock Pro, was introduced in 2022 as the successor to the OOLER. Chilipad Dock Pro features precise temperature control, Wi-Fi connectivity via app, AI-based optimization, and sleep tracking when paired with Sleepme’s mattress-based sleep tracker. Chilipad Cube offers water-based cooling/heating with adjustable single or dual-zone settings.

=== Chilipad 2.0 ===
The Chilipad 2.0 was introduced in 2026 as a redesigned version of the system. It uses a revised mattress pad, a quieter control unit and a physical bedside remote. The remote dial allows the bed cooling system to be operated without a phone or network connection.

The 2.0 is also available in single- and dual-zone configurations for couples, with bed sizes ranging from Twin XL to Split King. It retains the 55 to 115 °F (13 to 46 °C) temperature range of earlier models.

=== Other models ===
The original Chilipad Cube was introduced in 2014. It uses a separate control unit and manual controls to circulate heated or cooled water through the pad.

Chilipad OOLER, available from 2019 to 2023, featured app-based controls and scheduling. It was replaced by Chilipad 1.0 (formerly known as Dock Pro).

Sleepme’s mattress-based Sleep Tracker, available from 2022 to 2026, was a non-wearable sleep tracking system that monitors metrics like steep staging, heart rate, heart rate variability and respiratory rate, integrating with Sleepme's systems for automatic temperature adjustments.
