= Jeff, One Lonely Guy =

2012 book by Jeff Ragsdale

- First edition cover showing the flier
- Author: Jeff Ragsdale
- Language: English
- Genre: Nonfiction
- Published: March 20, 2012, New Harvest
- Publication place: United States
- ISBN: 1612183247
- Website: jeffragsdale.tumblr.com

Jeff, One Lonely Guy is a 2012 nonfiction book by Jeff Ragsdale. It was published on March 20, 2012 by New Harvest. Dave Eggers selected the book for inclusion in The Best American Nonrequired Reading 2012, and it was a GQ 2012 "Book of the Year". In 2014 Amitava Kumar included portions of Jeff, One Lonely Guy in his newly released book, A Matter of Rats: A Short Biography of Patna. Kumar previously interviewed Ragsdale and wrote about him in The New York Times.

== Background ==
In October 2011 Ragsdale posted several fliers around New York City as a social experiment.

Ragsdale collected many of the phone calls and texts into a book project similar to Postsecret. Ragsdale compiled the material into a manuscript, illustrating major themes that appeared most often in the correspondences. Ragsdale weaved personal essays throughout the manuscript to detail and illuminate his relationships, family life, and his forays into the New York stand-up comedy world.

== Reception ==
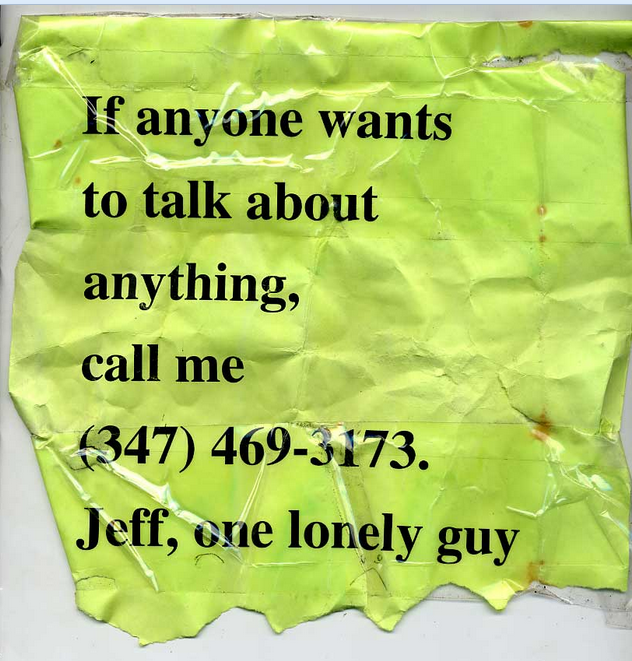
Original "Jeff, One Lonely Guy" flyer created & posted by Jeff Ragsdale in October, 2011 in the Soho district of New York City.

Critical reception for Ragsdale's book, Jeff, One Lonely Guy, has been very positive, with Bret Easton Ellis praising Jeff, One Lonely Guy: "The symphony of voices here is an overwhelming reading experience. This short book is also a verification of a legitimate new form of narrative; it’s the definitive document so far of where our medium is heading. I've never read anything like it." Ellis writes on Twitter: "The most powerful reading experience I've had in the last year is Jeff, One Lonely Guy by Jeff Ragsdale". He continues, "What I mean about a new art form: Jeff, One Lonely Guy by Jeff Ragsdale is really the first example of successful post-Empire reportage yet." Dave Eggers writes, "I love this—a great idea, and so deftly put together. A telling mosaic of modern loneliness and almost-connectedness." Poet and critic Nick Flynn asserts: "We have crossed over the threshold [with Ragsdale's new collage form], and are now—strangely, terrifyingly, beautifully—in this transformed world.” Literary critic, JW McCormack, writing for Bookforum, describes it as "revolutionary". A reviewer for the Seattle Post-Intelligencer commented that individual reader reception would be "a matter of personal taste" and that "[s]ome will be delighted at how well Ragsdale appears to know them. Others may just throw the book across the room in disgust. In the case of the latter, one should probably attempt to finish reading the entire thing first".

== Reality show based on flyer ==
In June 2013 Ragsdale was approached by Hollywood producer David A. Hurwitz (Fear Factor, Million Second Quiz, Bam's Bad Ass Game Show). Hurwitz was interested in developing a television show based on Ragsdale's social experiments and conceptual art projects. In fall 2013 Ragsdale and Hurwitz teamed up, wrote, and shot the pilot for the reality show, Being Noticed. The pilot was shot in Hollywood, Santa Monica, Venice Beach, Malibu, as well as various locations throughout Sherman Oaks. The cast and crew numbered in the dozens and the pilot was shot over the course of several weeks.

== Hotline documentary ==
Ragsdale stars in the award-winning 2014 documentary feature film, Hotline (2014 film), which The Daily Beast calls "brilliant". The film is directed by acclaimed MTV producer and director, Tony Shaff. Shaff and his film crew followed Ragsdale around New York City for weeks as Ragsdale worked his "Lonely Guy" hotline. Hotline premiered in Toronto at Hot Docs in April 2014, where it was an official selection and audience and jury favorite. On August 9, 2014 Hotline won First Prize for Best Feature Documentary at the Rhode Island International Film Festival. On May 9, 2014 the Brooklyn Film Festival announced that Hotline had been selected for inclusion in its prestigious feature film line-up.
