= The 4-Hour Workweek =

2007 self-help book by Timothy Ferriss

The 4-Hour Workweek: Escape 9–5, Live Anywhere, and Join the New Rich
- Author: Timothy Ferriss
- Cover artist: Barbara Sturman
- Language: English
- Subject: Self-actualization, self-employment, self-improvement
- Genre: Non-fiction
- Published: 2007 (Crown Publishing Group)
- Publication place: United States
- Pages: 308 pp
- ISBN: 978-0-307-35313-9 978-0-307-35313-9 (2007; 1st ed.); 978-1-4070-2300-7 (2007; 1st ed.; eBook); 978-0-307-46535-1 (2009; 2nd ed.); 978-0-307-59116-6 (2009; 2nd ed.; eBook)
- OCLC: 76262350
- Dewey Decimal: 650.1 22
- LC Class: HD6955 .F435 2007
- Followed by: The 4-Hour Body

The 4-Hour Workweek: Escape 9–5, Live Anywhere, and Join the New Rich (2007) is a self-help book by Timothy Ferriss, an American writer, educational activist, and entrepreneur. It deals with what Ferriss refers to as "lifestyle design", and repudiates the traditional "deferred" life plan in which people work grueling hours and take few vacations for decades and save money in order to relax after retirement. The book spent four years on The New York Times Best Seller List, was translated into 40 languages, and sold around 2.1 million copies.

== Background ==
Ferriss developed the ideas present in The 4-Hour Workweek (4HWW) while working 14-hour days at his sports nutrition supplement company, BrainQUICKEN. Frustrated by the overwork and lack of free time, Ferriss took a 3-week sabbatical to Europe. During that time and continued travels throughout Europe, Asia, and South America, Ferriss developed a streamlined system of checking email once per day and outsourcing small daily tasks to virtual assistants like AskSunday, paying them meagerly. His personal escape from a workaholic lifestyle was the genesis of the book.

The format of The 4-Hour Workweek took shape during a series of lectures Ferriss delivered on high-tech entrepreneurship at Princeton University, his alma mater. The lectures (and book) described Ferriss's own experiences in company automation and lifestyle development.

== Reception ==
The New York Times noted that Ferriss spends far more than 4 hours per week in blogging and self-promotion, which Ferriss describes as "evangelizing." USA Today commented: "If it all sounds too good to be true, maybe it is. Or maybe not. Clearly, selective ignorance, farming out chores and applying the 80/20 principle have paid off for Ferriss." Wired praised the book's ideas for remote work and its pre-retirement advice, but faulted it for "formulaic writing" and that "nearly every idea [is] taken to an extreme. No sense of work being anything more than a paycheck". Some reviewers noted that the book was quite lengthy and hard to read. Leslie Garner of The Telegraph noted that the book had a "punchy writing style" and that Ferriss had "struck a chord with his critique of workers' slavish devotion to corporations." Meagan Day of Jacobin criticized the book for advising readers to "become a fake expert." Jimmy Wales, cofounder of Wikipedia, said that he secretly moved to Buenos Aires, Argentina for a month after reading the book.

The book received coverage also through Fast Company, ABC News, The Today Show, Newsweek, and MSNBC.

== In popular culture ==
The book was mentioned in a 2011 episode of The Office (2005-2013) entitled "Lotto" (S08E03), in which warehouse foreman Darryl Philbin uses his interpretation of the book's ideas to do less work after not receiving a promotion.

On September 21, 2023, the book was featured on an episode of the podcast If Books Could Kill.
