= Trippy =

American travel website

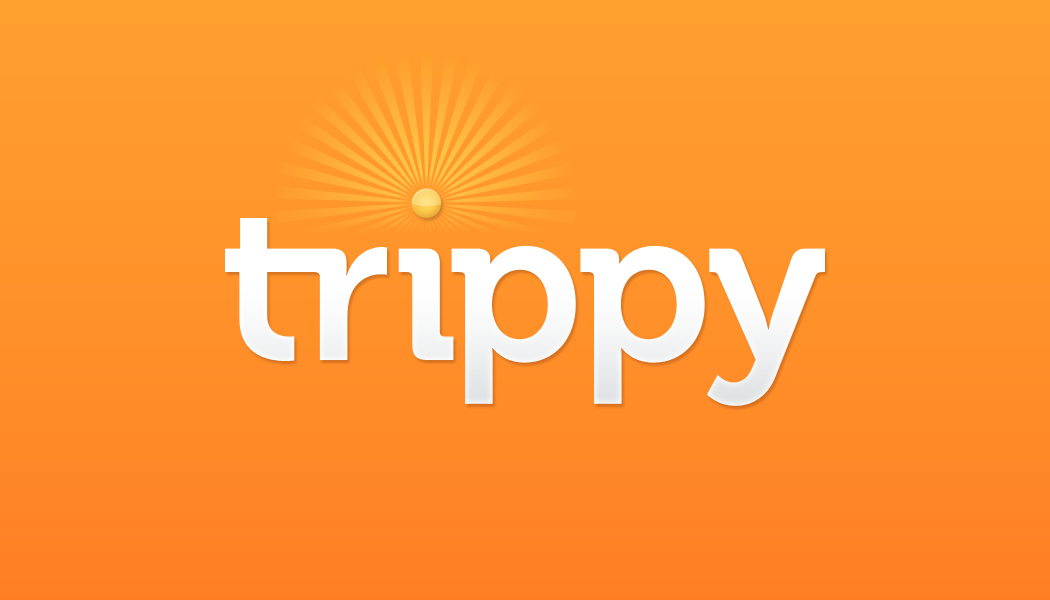

Trippy is a social and mobile friend-sourced tool launched in September 2011 founded by technology entrepreneur J.R. Johnson. who also founded Lunch.com, OneTime.com and VirtualTourist which was acquired by Expedia in 2008.

== About Trippy ==
Trippy aims to simplify and improve travel planning through what they call "friend-sourcing." The app ties into users' social networks, such as Facebook, to discover which friends, family and contacts have visited the considered destination—whether it be that they've checked-in, lived, worked, or studied there.

Through one-click recommendations and Facebook-style commenting, Trippy lets friends provide recommendations on hotels, restaurants, and destinations. The startup offers an auto-complete tool to quickly pull up what users are looking for from a database of locations. Users can then add places they're considering so that friends can comment on the itinerary, offering feedback in Facebook-style comment feeds.

== Launch ==
After debuting a private beta in September 2011 as a Battlefield Finalist at TechCrunch Disrupt, Trippy launched the open beta of its friend-sourced solution for travel content in October 2011.

== Investors ==
On November 15, 2011, Trippy announced its first round of seed funding, equaling $1.75M, co-led by Sequoia Capital and True Ventures. SV Angel also participated, along with individuals including Rob Solomon, Tim Ferriss, Brian Lee, Gil Ebaz, Brandee Barker, Chase Jarvis, Randi Zuckerberg, Jason Mraz, and Rachel Zoe, as well as others. The company announced that the capital would be used to accelerate product development.
