= Head Games (game show) =

- Genre: Game show
- Starring: Greg Proops
- Country of origin: United States
- No. of seasons: 1
- No. of episodes: 16

Production
- Producer: Whoopi Goldberg
- Running time: 30 minutes

Original release
- Network: Science Channel
- Release: October 17, 2009 – 2010

Head Games is an American science-themed game show, hosted by Greg Proops and produced by Whoopi Goldberg. It aired on the Science Channel. The show relied heavily on science experiments and demonstrations to provide a basis for the trivia questions that the contestants must answer. Goldberg described the gameplay as a "mashup" of many different game shows. Describing herself a "geek" and a curious person, Goldberg created Head Games to show people that there's "all kinds of science", not just the popular stereotype of laboratory "science with beakers".

The show aired regularly on Science Channel at 9:00 p.m. eastern on Saturday evenings from October through December 2009. Airings continued in reruns for several months past that time, before the show completely disappeared from the network's schedule in spring 2010.

== Gameplay ==
Three contestants compete simultaneously. During normal gameplay, all of the questions are related to science experiments or demonstrations which are shown to the contestants as prerecorded video clips. The contestants must attempt to predict the outcome of the experiment or demonstration. Each contestant chooses one of three possible outcomes and then the answer is revealed. After several multiple choice video questions, the gameplay changes to a faster paced bonus round where contestants must buzz-in and answer questions related to the previous video round. In the bonus round, wrong answers do not penalize the player, and other players may not answer a question once one player has attempted it.

After two video rounds and two bonus rounds, the lowest scoring player is eliminated. The final two players progress to the "under the microscope" round, where questions are presented rapidfire for a fixed amount of time, and contestants must buzz-in and choose from one of three answers. There is a Jeopardy!-style penalty in this last round, during which wrong answers subtract from the player's score. The player with the higher score at the end of the round wins his or her money and a Head Games championship trophy.
