= Cayla Kluver =

American author

Cayla Kluver is an American author known for her young adult trilogy series Legacy, which she began writing while she was fourteen. Kluver originally self-published the series before it was picked up by AmazonEncore and later, Harlequin Teen. Kluver briefly attended Elizabethtown College for one year. Kluver lives in Eau Claire, Wisconsin.

== Bibliography ==
=== Legacy ===
1. Legacy (2007 – AmazonEncore, 2011 – Harlequin Teen)
2. Allegiance (2011 – Harlequin Teen)
3. Sacrifice (2012 – Harlequin Teen)

=== Heirs of Chrior ===
1. The Queen's Choice (2014)
2. The Empty Throne (2015)
3. Untitled third book (TBA)
