= Tim Ferriss =

American entrepreneur, investor, author, and podcaster (born 1977)

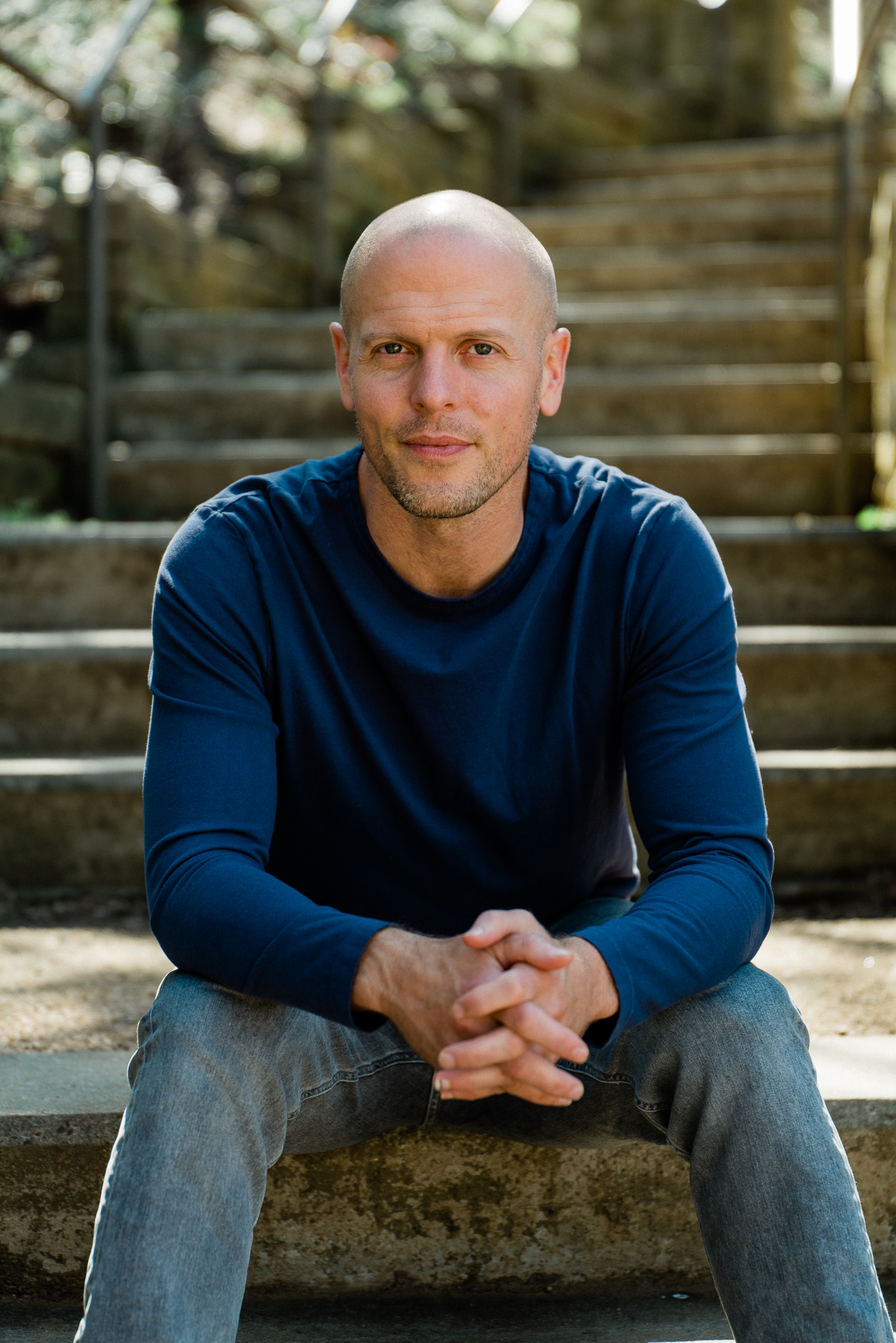
- Tim Ferriss in 2021
- Born: Timothy Ferriss; July 20, 1977 (age 49); East Hampton, New York, U.S.
- Education: Princeton University (BA)
- Occupations: Author, podcaster, investor
- Writing career
- Genres: Self-help, Physical fitness
- Notable works: The 4-Hour Workweek; The 4-Hour Body; The 4-Hour Chef; Tools of Titans

Timothy Ferriss (born July 20, 1977) is an American entrepreneur, investor, author, podcaster, and lifestyle guru. He is known for his 4-Hour self-help book series—including The 4-Hour Work Week, The 4-Hour Body, and The 4-Hour Chef—that focused on lifestyle optimizations, but he has since reconsidered this approach. He also supports scientific research into psychedelic treatments.

== Early life ==
Ferriss grew up in East Hampton, New York, and credits his poor health in childhood for sparking an interest in self-improvement. At age 15, he spent a year in Japan as an exchange student. He was a member of the wrestling team in high school. After graduating from St. Paul's School, he attended Princeton University, earning a B.A. in East Asian studies in 2000, then first worked in sales at a data storage company.

== Career ==
=== Early Career ===
In 2001, Ferriss founded BrainQUICKEN, an internet-based nutritional supplements business, while still employed at his prior job. He sold the company, then known as BodyQUICK, to a London-based private equity firm in 2010. He has stated that The 4-Hour Workweek was based on this period.

=== Investments ===
Ferriss has been an angel investor and startup advisor. He invested or advised in companies including Reputation.com, Trippy, Digg, StumbleUpon, Posterous, SimpleGeo, DailyBurn, Facebook, Ampa, and Neko Health. Ferriss also served as a strategic advisor to Evernote and TaskRabbit. He is a pre-seed money advisor to Uber. In 2013, Ferriss raised $250,000 to invest in Shyp by forming a syndicate on AngelList. Ferriss raised over $500,000 through his backers, and Shyp raised a total of $2.1 million. In 2018, Shyp shut down and laid off all its employees. Ferriss was an advisor to Shopify, helping them to launch the "Build a Business" competition that fostered web-store startups in 2010 with a $100,000 prize. He was also an investor in Duolingo and Twitter.

In 2015, Ferriss declared a long vacation from new investing. He cited the stress of the work and a feeling his impact was "minimal in the long run", and said he planned to spend time on his writing and media projects. In 2017 he stated one of the reasons he moved from Silicon Valley was that, "After effectively 'retiring' from angel investing 2 years ago," he had no professional need to be in the Bay Area.

=== Books ===
In November 2013, Ferriss began an audiobook publishing venture, Tim Ferriss Publishing. The first book published was Vagabonding by Rolf Potts. Other books include Ego Is the Enemy and The Obstacle Is the Way by Ryan Holiday, Daily Rituals by Mason Currey, and What I Learned Losing a Million Dollars by Jim Paul and Brendan Moynihan.

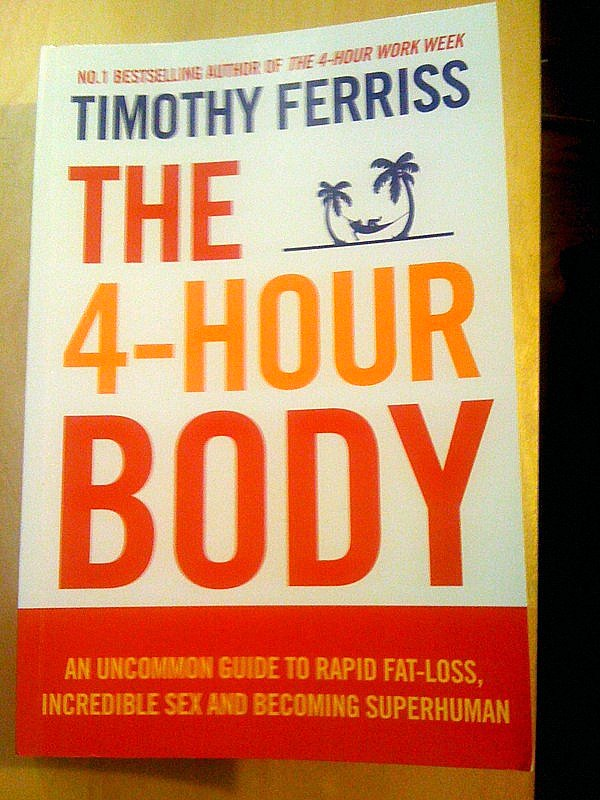
The 4-Hour Body, one of the most notable works of Ferriss

Ferriss has written five books, The 4-Hour Workweek (2007, expanded edition 2009), The 4-Hour Body (2010), The 4-Hour Chef (2012), Tools of Titans (2016), and Tribe of Mentors (2017).

=== Television ===
In December 2013, The Tim Ferriss Experiment debuted on HLN. The series focused on Ferriss' life hacking and speed learning methods. Although 13 episodes were produced, only a portion were shown on television. Ferriss also hosted the 2017 TV show Fear{Less} with Tim Ferriss, in which he interviews people from different industries about success and innovation. In 2015, Ferriss acquired the rights to all of The Tim Ferriss Experiment's episodes. He distributed them on iTunes, where they were featured in the most-downloaded chart. In 2016, Ferriss was listed in Fortune (magazine)'s 40 Under 40.

=== Podcast ===
Ferriss is the host of The Tim Ferriss Show, an interview-centered podcast that has been running since 2014. The podcast has more than one billion downloads. Popular podcast guests include Brené Brown, Jamie Foxx, Arnold Schwarzenegger, Maria Sharapova, LeBron James, and Matthew McConaughey.

== Views ==
Ferriss has publicly advocated the value of Stoicism and meditation, crediting it with helping him deal with his bipolar disorder, and states that his personal experience with psychiatric disorders and losing a friend to fentanyl drug overdose motivates his involvement in psychedelics research. In 2017, Tim Ferriss gave the TED talk "Why you should define your fears instead of your goals".

He reevaluated his earlier ideas in a 2020 interview with GQ, concluding that "not everything that is meaningful can be measured." In his turn towards resilience and even spirituality, he recommended three books, Radical Acceptance by Tara Brach, Awareness by Anthony de Mello, and Letters From a Stoic (Epistulae Morales ad Lucilium) by Lucius Seneca. He calls the last one, "My favorite writing of all time".

== Philanthropy ==
Ferriss became interested in the potential of psychedelics due to personal experiences with depression, as well as bipolar disorder, and addiction in his family. In 2015, Ferriss met Roland Griffiths, who was leading research in psychedelics at the Johns Hopkins University School of Medicine, and organized a crowdfunding campaign to support Griffiths' research into depression.

In 2019, Ferriss contributed to Imperial College London's Center for Psychedelic Research. That year, Ferriss donated more than $2 million to fund the Johns Hopkins Center for Psychedelic & Consciousness Research led by Griffiths, and he organized an additional $8 million in commitments.

In 2020, Ferriss donated $1 million to the Multidisciplinary Association for Psychedelic Studies for research into PTSD treatments using psychedelic-drug MDMA. He issued a $10 million challenge grant, and helped to raise a total of $30 million for the research by publicizing the challenge on his podcast. The following year, Ferriss donated to promote psychedelic research at the Neuroscape Psychedelics Division at the University of California, San Francisco, led by Robin Carhart-Harris and Adam Gazzaley.

In 2018, Ferriss founded the Saisei Foundation. In 2021, the foundation committed $800,000 to UC Berkeley's Center for the Science of Psychedelics to create the Ferriss – UC Berkeley Psychedelic Journalism Fellowship with author Michael Pollan. The fellowship provides ten annual grants of $10,000 each to journalists working on in-depth print and audio stories focused on psychedelics. The Foundation also collaborated with the Petrie-Flom Center for Health Law Policy, Biotechnology, and Bioethics at Harvard Law School and co-funded POPLAR, the Project on Psychedelics Law and Regulation.

Ferriss was a member of the National Advisory Council of DonorsChoose and, as of 2016, was a donor and a member of the advisory board of QuestBridge. In 2016, as part of a #BestSchoolDay campaign led by Stephen Colbert, Ferriss funded all 145 classroom projects on Long Island, as well as all the classroom projects in New Hampshire and Sacramento, California with DonorsChoose.org.

== Personal life ==
Ferriss won a National Chinese Kickboxing Championship by technical knock-out, and is the first American to hold a Guinness World Record for tango spins.

In 2025, he released a card game, Coyote, in partnership with Exploding Kittens.

== Published works ==
- Ferriss, Timothy (2007). The 4-Hour Workweek: Escape 9–5, Live Anywhere, and Join the New Rich. New York: Crown Publishers. ISBN 978-0-307-35313-9.
- Ferriss, Timothy (2009). The 4-Hour Workweek: Escape 9–5, Live Anywhere, and Join the New Rich (Expanded and Updated ed.). New York: Crown Publishers. ISBN 978-0-307-46535-1.
- Ferriss, Timothy (2010). The 4-Hour Body: An Uncommon Guide to Rapid Fat-Loss, Incredible Sex, and Becoming Superhuman. New York: Crown Archetype. ISBN 978-0307463630.
- Ferriss, Timothy (2012). The 4-Hour Chef: The Simple Path to Cooking Like a Pro, Learning Anything, and Living the Good Life. New York: Houghton Mifflin Harcourt. ISBN 978-0-547-88459-2.
- Ferriss, Timothy (2016). Tools of Titans: The Tactics, Routines, and Habits of Billionaires, Icons, and World-Class Performers. New York: Houghton Mifflin Harcourt. ISBN 978-1-328-68378-6.
- Ferriss, Timothy (2017). Tribe of Mentors: Short Life Advice from the Best in the World. New York: Houghton Mifflin Harcourt. ISBN 978-1-328-99496-7.
