= 2023 British Academy Scotland Awards =

- Date: 19 November 2023
- Site: Glasgow, Scotland
- Hosted by: Edith Bowman

The 2023 British Academy Scotland Awards took place on 19 November 2023 in Glasgow, Scotland. The ceremony was hosted by Edith Bowman.

== Nominations and winners ==
The nominations were announced on 11 October and the winners were announced on 19 November. Winners are listed first and highlighted in boldface.

Best Actor in Film	Best Actress in Film
**Paul Mescal – Aftersun**: James Cosmo – My Sailor, My Love; Chinaza Uche – A Good Person	**Lucy Halliday – Blue Jean**: Frankie Corio – Aftersun; Sally Hawkins – The Lost King
Best Actor in Television	Best Actress in Television
**Lewis Gribben – Somewhere Boy**: Brian Cox – Succession; Tony Curran – Mayflies; Conor McCarron – Dog Days	**Lauren Lyle – Karen Pirie**: Izuka Hoyle – Big Boys; Ashley Jensen – Mayflies; Vignette Robinson – Six Four
Best Director (Factual)	Best Director (Fiction)
**Jono McLeod – My Old School**: Alice McMahon-Major – Three Mothers, Two Babies and a Scandal; Matt Pinder – The Hunt for the World’s End Killers	**Charlotte Wells – Aftersun**: Jon S. Baird – Tetris; Gareth Bryn – Karen Pirie
Entertainment	Factual Series
**Frankie Boyle's Farewell to the Monarchy – Production Team (Two Rivers Media/Channel 4)**: Richard Osman's House of Games – Tamara Gilder, Breid McLoone, John Smith, Gemma Whitford - Remarkable Television/BBC Two; Susan Calman’s Grand Day Out – Production Team (IWC Media/Channel 5)	**Three Mothers, Two Babies and a Scandal – Alice McMahon-Major, Nicole Kleeman, Vari Innes, Naomi Buchanan (Firecrest Films/Amazon Prime Video)**: Fred West: The Glasgow Girls – Production Team (IWC Media/Sky Crime); The Women Who Changed Modern Scotland – Production Team (Two Rivers Media/BBC Scotland)
Feature Film	Features
**Winners – Hassan Nazer, Nadira Murray, Paul Welsh, Arash Seifie Jamadi**: My Old School – Jono McLeod, John Archer, Olivia Lichtenstein, Berny McGurk; Aftersun – Charlotte Wells, Mark Ceryak, Amy Jackson, Barry Jenkins, Adele Romanski	**Designing the Hebrides –** Production Team (DSP/BBC Scotland): Kirstie and Phil’s Love it or List it – Kirstie Allsopp, Phil Spencer, Laura Harding, Jonny Wharton (Raise the Roof Productions/Channel 4); The Yorkshire Auction House – Craig Hunter, John Redshaw, Diccon Green, Sarah Forster (STV Studios/Really)
Short Film & Animation	Single Documentary
**A Long Winter – Eilidh Munro, Finlay Pretsell**: Clean – Miranda Stern, Reece Cargan; Shackle – Ainslie Henderson, Will Anderson	**The Mysterious Mr Lagerfeld – Michael Waldman, Lorraine McKechnie, David G. Hill, Calum Leslie (Finestripe Productions/BBC Two)**: The Snowman: The Film That Changed Christmas – Production Team (Two Rivers Media/Channel 4); War and Justice: The Case of Marine A – Production Team (Two Rivers Media, Uppercut Films/Channel 4)
Specialist Factual	Television Scripted
**Imagine: Douglas Stuart... Love, Hope and Grit – Linda Sands, Tanya Hudson, Alan Yentob, Ed Horne (BBC Studios/BBC One)**: Becoming Fridah Kahlo – James Rogan, Mark Hedgecoe, Nancy Bornat, Louise Lockwood (Rogan Productions/BBC One); What Killed the Whale? – Production Team (STV Studios/Channel 4)	**Mayflies – Claire Mundell, Brian Kaczynski, Andrea Gibb, Peter Mackie Burns (Synchronicity Films/BBC One)**: Guilt – Production Team (Expectation North, Happy Tramp North/BBC Scotland); Karen Pirie – Production Team (World Productions/ITV)
Writer Film/Television in partnership with Screen Scotland
**Charlotte Wells – Aftersun**: Neil Forsyth – The Gold; Krysty Wilson-Cairns – The Good Nurse

=== Outstanding Contribution awards ===
- Outstanding Contribution to Film & Television – Shirley Henderson
- Outstanding Contribution to Craft – Stuart Wilson (sound engineering)
