= Lucy Halliday =

Scottish actress (born 2003)

- Born: Lucy Caroline Halliday; 2003 (age 22–23); Paisley, Renfrewshire, Scotland
- Occupation: Actress
- Years active: 2022–present
- Known for: Blue Jean (2022); California Schemin' (2025); The Testaments (2026)
- Awards: BAFTA Scotland

Lucy Caroline Halliday (born 2003) is a Scottish actress. She rose to prominence in 2022 after making her screen debut in the British drama Blue Jean, for which she received a British Independent Film Award nomination and won the BAFTA Scotland Award for Best Actress.

She appeared in the musical biographical film California Schemin' (2025) alongside James McAvoy, before taking the co-lead role of Daisy in The Testaments (2026).

== Early life and career ==
Halliday was born and raised in Paisley where she took part in youth theatre productions with PACE Youth Theatre from a young age. Despite her early involvement in acting, she did not initially consider it a long-term career and had set those ambitions aside by the time she reached adulthood. After being accepted to study medicine, her plans changed when Halliday came across an open casting call for Blue Jean and decided to audition.

"How I got my first job was quite gutsy, There was an open call for a film that I saw online, and I didn't really match any of the description that they'd said, but I sent an email anyway, being like, ‘I'm perfect for this!’."

— Halliday on winning her first acting role

Blue Jean was Halliday's first professional audition. By her own account, she did not match the brief listed in the call, but emailed the production regardless. She was cast as Lois, a secondary school student. At the 2022 British Independent Film Awards, Halliday was nominated for Best Supporting Performance, and was also included in the ensemble nomination shared by the cast. She won the Actress Film award at the BAFTA Scotland Awards in Glasgow on 19 November 2023 for her debut screen performance.

In 2025, Halliday appeared as Mary Boyd in California Schemin', a musical biographical film based on Gavin Bain's memoir of the same name. The film tells the true story of Silibil N' Brains, a rap duo from Dundee. Halliday was listed among the principal cast alongside Séamus McLean Ross and Samuel Bottomley.

Halliday stars in Hulu's television adaptation of Margaret Atwood's 2019 novel The Testaments, a sequel to The Handmaid's Tale. She portrays Daisy, one of the two protagonists.

Halliday is set to star as Ann Westbourne in the upcoming drama film 7 Miles Out, which is scheduled to be released by Cannon and Morley Productions and Revolution Films.

== Filmography ==
Key
†	Denotes productions that have not yet been released

=== Film ===
Year	Title	Role
2022	Blue Jean	Lois
2025	California Schemin'	Mary Boyd
2026	7 Miles Out	Ann Westbourne

=== Television ===
Year	Title	Role
2026	The Testaments	Daisy / Marguerite

== Awards and nominations ==
Year	Award	Category	Work	Result
2022	British Independent Film Awards	Best Supporting Performance	Blue Jean	Nominated
2022	British Independent Film Awards	Best Ensemble Performance	Blue Jean	Nominated
2023	BAFTA Scotland	Actress Film	Blue Jean	Won
