= British Independent Film Awards 2022 =

25th British Independent Film Awards
- Awarded for: Best in British independent film
- Date: 4 December 2022
- Site: Old Billingsgate, London
- Hosted by: Ben Bailey Smith
- Official website: www.bifa.film

Highlights
- Best Feature: Aftersun
- Most awards: Aftersun (7)
- Most nominations: Aftersun (16)

The British Independent Film Awards 2022 were held on 4 December 2022 to recognise the best in British independent cinema and filmmaking talent from United Kingdom. The nominations were announced on 4 November 2022 by actors Sam Claflin and Kosar Ali during an event in London. Aftersun led the nominations with 16, followed by Blue Jean with 13 and The Wonder with 12. The ceremony took place at Old Billingsgate in London and was hosted by Ben Bailey Smith.

Aftersun won the most awards, winning 7 awards including the top prize, Best British Independent Film.

In July 2022, it was announced that gender-neutral categories would replace the male and female performance categories, introducing Best Lead Performance, Best Supporting Performance, Best Joint Lead Performance and Best Ensemble Performance. Additionally, the creation of Best Debut Director – Feature Documentary and the division of the Best Music category into Best Original Music and Best Music Supervision were also announced.

The longlists for Best International Independent Film, Best Documentary and the Raindance Discovery Award were announced on 21 October, while the longlists for The Douglas Hickox Award (Best Debut Director), Best Debut Director – Feature Documentary, Best Debut Screenwriter, Breakthrough Performance and Breakthrough Producer were announced on 24 October.

== Winners and nominees ==
The nominations were announced on 4 November 2022. The winners of the craft categories were announced on 18 November 2022. The winners for the remaining categories were announced during a ceremony on 4 December 2022.

| Best British Independent Film | Best Director |
|---|---|
| Aftersun – Charlotte Wells, Barry Jenkins, Mark Ceryak, Adele Romanski, Amy Jackson; Blue Jean – Georgia Oakley, Hélène Sifre; Good Luck to You, Leo Grande – Sophie Hyde, Katy Brand, Debbie Gray, Adrian Politowski; Living – Oliver Hermanus, Kazuo Ishiguro, Stephen Woolley, Elizabeth Karlsen; The Wonder – Sebastián Lelio, Emma Donoghue, Alice Birch, Juliette Howell, Andrew Lowe, Tessa Ross, Ed Guiney | Aftersun – Charlotte Wells; Living – Oliver Hermanus; Good Luck to You, Leo Grande – Sophie Hyde; The Wonder – Sebastián Lelio; Blue Jean – Georgia Oakley |
| Best Lead Performance | Best Supporting Performance |
| Rosy McEwen – Blue Jean as Jean; Sally Hawkins – The Lost King as Philippa Langley; Cosmo Jarvis – It Is In Us All as Hamish Considine; Emma Mackey – Emily as Emily Brontë; Bill Nighy – Living as Mr. Williams; Florence Pugh – The Wonder as Lib Wright; Emily Watson – God's Creatures as Aileen O'Hara; Hala Zein – Nezouh as Zeina | Kerrie Hayes – Blue Jean as Viv; Zoey Deutch – The Outfit as Mable Shaun; Aisling Franciosi – God's Creatures as Sarah Murphy; Lucy Halliday – Blue Jean as Lois; Zainab Joda – Our River... Our Sky as Reema; Fatma Mohamed – Flux Gourmet as Elle di Elle; Paul Mescal – God's Creatures as Brian O'Hara; Fionn Whitehead – Emily as Branwell Brontë; Aimee Lou Wood – Living as Margaret |
| Best Joint Lead Performance | Breakthrough Performance |
| Letitia Wright and Tamara Lawrance – The Silent Twins as June and Jennifer Gibbons; Frankie Corio and Paul Mescal – Aftersun as Sophie and Calum; Daryl McCormack and Emma Thompson – Good Luck to You, Leo Grande as Leo Grande / Connor and Nancy Stokes / Susan Robinson; Jessie Buckley and Rory Kinnear – Men as Harper Marlowe and Geoffrey | Safia Oakley-Green – The Origin as Beyah; Frankie Corio – Aftersun as Sophie; Leo Long – I Used to Be Famous as Stevie; Kíla Lord Cassidy – The Wonder as Anna O'Donnell; Rosy McEwen – Blue Jean as Jean |
| Best Screenplay | Best Documentary |
| Aftersun – Charlotte Wells; Good Luck to You, Leo Grande – Katy Brand; Living – Kazuo Ishiguro; The Wonder – Sebastián Lelio, Alice Birch and Emma Donoghue; Blue Jean – Georgia Oakley | Nothing Compares – Kathryn Ferguson, Eleanor Emptage, Michael Mallie; My Childhood, My Country – 20 Years in Afghanistan – Phil Grabsky, Shoaib Sharifi, Amanda Wilkie; My Old School – Jono McLeod, John Archer, Olivia Lichtenstein; Nascondino – Victoria Fiore, Jennifer Corcoran, Aleksandra Bilić; Young Plato – Neasa Ní Chianáin, Declan McGrath, David Rane |
| Best International Independent Film | Best Short Film |
| The Worst Person in the World – Joachim Trier, Eskil Vogt, Andrea Berentsen Ottmar, Thomas Robsahm; All the Beauty and the Bloodshed – Laura Poitras, Howard Gertler, John Lyons, Nan Goldin, Yoni Golijov; Close – Lukas Dhont, Angelo Tijssens, Michiel Dhont, Dirk Impens; Decision to Leave – Park Chan-Wook, Chung Seo-Kyung; Everything Everywhere All at Once – Daniel Kwan, Daniel Scheinert, Jonathan Wang, Joe Russo, Anthony Russo, Mike Larocca | Too Rough – Sean Lìonadh, Ross McKenzie, Alfredo Covelli; A Fox in the Night – Keeran Anwar Blessie, Benjamin Jacob Smith; Honesty – Roxy Rezvany, Emily Renée, Elly Camisa; Sandstorm – Seemab Gul, Abid Aziz Merchant; Scale – Joseph Pierce, Hélène Mitjavile |
| Best Casting | Cinematography |
| Blue Jean – Shaheen Baig; Our River... Our Sky – Leila Bertrand; The Silent Twins – Kharmel Cochrane; Living – Kahleen Crawford; Aftersun – Lucy Pardee | Aftersun – Gregory Oke; Nascondino – Alfredo de Juan; Men – Rob Hardy; Kanaval – Joel Honeywell; The Wonder – Ari Wegner |
| Best Costume Design | Best Editing |
| Mrs. Harris Goes to Paris – Jenny Beavan; Flux Gourmet – Saffron Cullane; The Wonder – Odile Dicks-Mireaux; Aftersun – Frank Gallacher; Living – Sandy Powell | Aftersun – Blair McClendon; Elizabeth: A Portrait in Parts – Joanna Crickmay; Blue Jean – Izabella Curry; Flux Gourmet – Mátyás Fekete; Nothing Compares – Mich Mahon |
| Best Effects | Best Make-Up & Hair Design |
| Men – David Simpson; The Feast – Chris Marshall; Nezouh – Ahmed Yousry | Medusa Deluxe – Eugene Souleiman, Scarlett O'Connell; Aftersun – Oya Aygör, Murat Çağin; The Wonder – Morna Ferguson, Lorry Ann King; Flux Gourmet – Siobhan Harper-Ryan; The Origin – Niamh Morrison |
| Best Original Music | Best Music Supervision |
| The Wonder – Matthew Herbert; God's Creatures – Danny Bensi, Saunder Jurriaans; Aftersun – Oliver Coates; The Origin – Adam Janota Bzowski; Men – Ben Salisbury, Geoff Barrow | Aftersun – Lucy Bright; The Phantom of the Open – Phil Canning; Living – Rupert Hollier |
| Best Production Design | Best Sound |
| Living – Helen Scott; Flux Gourmet – Fletcher Jarvis; The Wonder – Grant Montgomery; Aftersun – Bailur Turan; Medusa Deluxe – Gary Williamson | Flux Gourmet – Tim Harrison, Raoul Brand, Cassandra Rutledge; Men – Glenn Freemantle, Ben Barker, Gillian Dodders, Howard Bargoff, Mitch Low; Aftersun – Jovan Adjer; The Wonder – Hugh Fox, Ben Baird; The Feast – Dom Corbisiero, Dai Shell |
| Douglas Hickox Award (Best Debut Director) | Best Debut Screenwriter |
| Aftersun – Charlotte Wells; The Origin – Andrew Cumming; Medusa Deluxe – Thomas Hardiman; Emily – Frances O'Connor; Blue Jean – Georgia Oakley | Blue Jean – Georgia Oakley; God's Creatures – Shane Crowley; Brian and Charles – Davi Earl, Chris Hayward; The Origin – Ruth Greenberg; Aftersun – Charlotte Wells |
| Breakthrough Producer | The Raindance Discovery Award |
| Winners – Nadira Murray; Nascondino – Aleksandra Bilić, Jennifer Corcoran; Nightride – Paul Kennedy; Brian and Charles – Rupert Majendie; Blue Jean – Hélène Sifre | Winners – Hassan Nazer, Nadira Murray, Paul Welsh; Electric Malady – Marie Lidén, Aimara Reques; Fadia's Tree – Sarah Beddington, Susan Simnett; Off the Rails – Peter Day, Grant Keir, Rob Alexander; Rebellion – Elena Sánchez Bellot, Maia Kenworthy, Kat Mansoor |
| Best Debut Director – Feature Documentary | Best Ensemble Performance |
| Nothing Compares – Kathryn Ferguson; Nascondino – Victoria Fiore; Kanaval – Leah Gordon, Eddie Hutton; My Old School – Jono McLeod; Fashion Reminagined – Becky Hutner | Our River... Our Sky – Zainab Joda, Darina Al Joundi, Amed Hashimi, Mahmoud Abo Al Abbas, Basim Hajar, Labwa Arab, Meriam Abbas, Siham Mustafa; Blue Jean – Rosy McEwen, Kerrie Hayes, Lucy Halliday, Lydia Page, Stacy Abalogun, Farrah Cave, Amy Booth-Steel; Emily – Amelia Gething, Emma Mackey, Oliver Jackson-Cohen, Fionn Whitehead, Alexandra Dowling, Gemma Jones, Adrian Dunbar; Flux Gourmet – Makis Papadimitriou, Gwendoline Christie, Asa Butterfield, Fatma Mohamed, Ariane Labed, Richard Bremmer; The Wonder – Kíla Lord Cassidy, Florence Pugh, Tom Burke, Toby Jones, Niamh Algar, Elaine Cassidy, Ciarán Hinds, Brían F. O'Byrne, Josie Walker |
Richard Harris Award
Samantha Morton

=== Films with multiple nominations and awards ===
Films that received multiple nominations
| Nominations | Film |
|---|---|
| 16 | Aftersun |
| 13 | Blue Jean |
| 12 | The Wonder |
| 8 | Living |
| 7 | Flux Gourmet |
| 5 | Men |
| 5 | The Origin |
| 5 | God's Creatures |
| 4 | Good Luck to You, Leo Grande |
| 4 | Nascondino |
| 4 | Emily |
| 3 | Nothing Compares |
| 3 | Medusa Deluxe |
| 3 | Our River... Our Sky |
| 2 | My Old School |
| 2 | The Silent Twins |
| 2 | Kanaval |
| 2 | Brian and Charles |
| 2 | Winners |
| 2 | Nezouh |
| 2 | The Feast |

Films that received multiple awards
| Awards | Film |
|---|---|
| 7 | Aftersun |
| 4 | Blue Jean |
| 2 | Nothing Compares |
| 2 | Winners |
