= Séamus McLean Ross =

Scottish actor

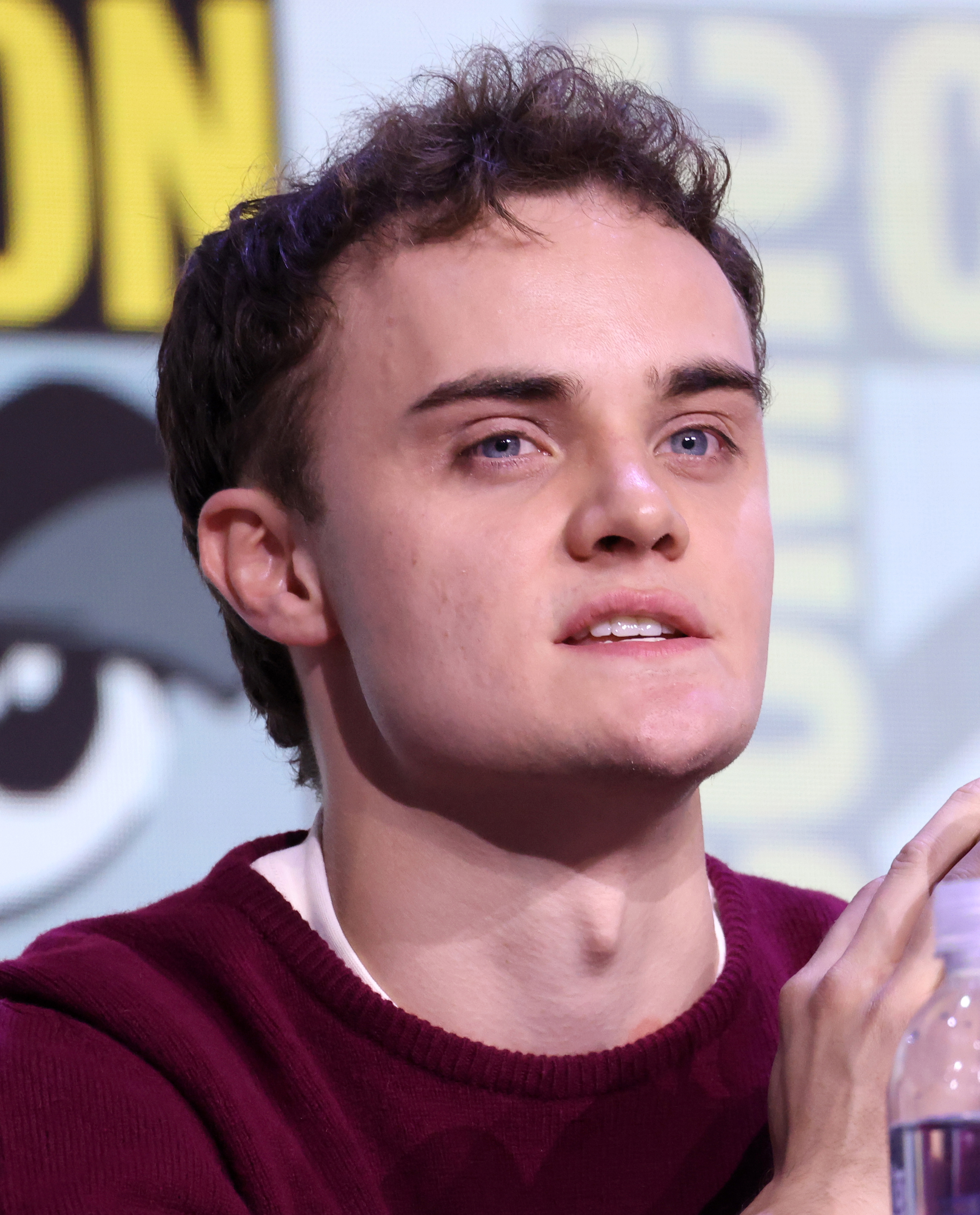
- McLean Ross in 2025.
- Education: Guildhall School of Music & Drama
- Occupation: Actor
- Years active: 2023–
- Television: Outlander: Blood of My Blood
- Parents: Ricky Ross (father); Lorraine McIntosh (mother)

Séamus McLean Ross is a Scottish actor.

== Early life ==
He is the son of Deacon Blue musicians Ricky Ross and Lorraine McIntosh. He attended Guildhall School of Music & Drama in London.

== Career ==
He had an early role in television thriller Payback alongside Peter Mullan, and appeared in the reboot of Scottish detective series Rebus. He can also be seen on television as the younger version of Colum MacKenzie in 2025 Outlander prequel series Outlander: Blood of My Blood, a role played by Gary Lewis in the original series. He was included by Screen International as part of their Rising Stars Scotland series.

He was cast in a leading role opposite Samuel Bottomley in James McAvoy's directorial debut film California Schemin', a musical biopic of Scottish rap duo Silibil N' Brains. Principal photography began on the film in November 2024 with a premiere date set for the following year at the 2025 Toronto International Film Festival. For their performance, he and Bottomley were nominated for Best Joint Lead Performance at the British Independent Film Awards.

== Personal life ==
He is a keen football fan and a season ticket holder at Dundee United where the Deacon Blue song "Dignity" has been adopted by fans of the club. The song Still Walking on his father's album Short Stories – Vol 2 (2022) is written about a camping trip they took together.

== Filmography ==
Year	Title	Role	Notes
2023	Payback	Nicky Leigh	
2024	Rebus	Jack	3 episodes
2025	Outlander: Blood of My Blood	Colum MacKenzie	10 episodes
2025	California Schemin'	Gavin Bain	Lead role
TBA	Bare	TBA	Filming
