= The Split Second =

2008 novel by John Hulme and Michael Wexler

- The first cover edition of The Split Second
- Author: John Hulme and Michael Wexler
- Language: English
- Series: The Seems
- Genre: Fantasy novel
- Publisher: Bloomsbury Publishing
- Publication date: September 30th, 2008
- Publication place: United States
- Media type: Print (Hardback & Paperback)
- Preceded by: The Glitch in Sleep
- Followed by: The Lost Train of Thought

The Split Second is the second novel in The Seems series. It was published by Bloomsbury Publishing and written by John Hulme and Michael Wexler. It follows Becker Drane, a Fixer for The Seems on a Mission to retrieve a Second. A Second is a mineral in The Seems which provides Time for our World. The Seems is a parallel universe in charge of providing our World with what it needs to keep on going.

== Plot ==
The second book follows Becker Drane on another mission. At the end of the first book, The Glitch in Sleep, it was revealed 50 trays of Frozen Moments were stolen. With that, a Time Bomb could be constructed causing great damage to The World. When news show the Time Bomb has been found in the Department of Time, Lucien Chiappa is sent in to Fix it, until the bomb explodes and Becker is called in to repair the mess by bringing the two parts of the bomb together so no Essence (a liquid that causes everything to age much faster) can enter the World.

To Fix the Second, Becker must bring both halves of the Second together again to prevent any more Essence from dripping out. The first is found in a basement and the second is found to be trapped by the Tide, the organization who created the bomb and wants to overthrow the current order of the Seems and create a new world.

A legendary Fixer thought to be dead, Tom Jackal arrives to help Becker and manages to capture the Second and put it together, but the Essence has soaked through their Sleeves (lightweight bodysuits) and causes him to age. Tom dies from overexposure, but saves the World.

At the end, Becker breaks the Golden Rule which prevents him from meeting with Jenifer Kaley, whose Case File (documents on her private life) was given to Becker after the Mission. However, in the epilogue, the Time Being, a powerful founder of the Seems agrees to join The Tide.

== Themes ==
The main theme in The Split Second as a reviewer noted is how, "the Seemsians, especially our protagonist Becker Drane, have strong ethics, remain true to their goals and doing the right thing, and they understand and buy into doing your part for society and following the rules that accompany life." This is a common problem for Becker as he has broken many of the Rules by the end of the book such as the Golden Rule which is also known as the "'granddaddy of them all[rules]"

== Critical reception ==
The Split Second received positive reviews. A review from the School Library Journal in the audio book criticized Oliver Wyman's narration, but praised the books "many hilarious wordplays and puns". It also commented on the book's complex plot and many varying viewpoints. A review from Booklist was very positive stating "This sequel continues to develop a truly ingenious setting while proving every bit as much of a nail-biter as the first".The Split Second was also ranked fifth for the 20 best books for middle schoolers in 2008 by reviewer Peter Glassman. He called the book "ingenious, wildly inventive, laugh out loud funny, touching and poignant at times" Kirkus Reviews was not as positive saying, "Heartwarming fluff follows predictable story lines with original and silly set-dressing".
