= The Glitch in Sleep =

2007 novel by John Hulme and Michael Wexler

- The first cover edition of The Glitch in Sleep
- Author: John Hulme and Michael Wexler
- Language: English
- Series: The Seems
- Genre: Fantasy novel
- Publisher: Bloomsbury Publishing
- Publication date: September 18, 2007
- Publication place: United States
- Media type: Print (Hardback & Paperback)
- Pages: 288
- ISBN: 978-1-59990-129-9
- Followed by: The Split Second

The Glitch in Sleep is the first novel in The Seems children series, released as a hardcover on September 18, 2007 by Bloomsbury Publishing. It was written by John Hulme and Michael Wexler. The book follows Becker Drane, a Fixer for The Seems on his first Mission to find and capture a Glitch. The Seems is a parallel universe in charge of providing our World with what it needs to keep on going.

The book has also been released as a paperback and as an audiobook. The audiobook was read by Oliver Wyman whose performance was praised by Booklist. Two new covers have been released for the book both in paperback format. The book was well received by critics who commonly praised the creativity and humor. The Glitch in Sleep has also received many awards such as included in Amazon's Best Books of the Year (2007). There is a movie in production being directed by Shawn Levy who also directed Night at the Museum and Night at the Museum: Battle of the Smithsonian. However, no release date has been announced yet.

== Synopsis ==
=== Setting ===
The Glitch in Sleep takes place in two worlds, The Seems and The World. The Seems is another world which is in charge of providing our World (The World) with everything it might need, from Sleep to Sunset. In the Seems, there are Departments that control various needs of our World such as Time and Nature. Whenever something goes wrong in The Seems, an elite team of professionals are sent in to Fix the problem. The team is made up of one Fixer and one Briefer. A Briefer is equal to the assistant of the Fixer. If the problems of The Seems are not fixed, The World would be affected depending on how the severe the problem is in the Seems.

=== Characters ===
- Becker Drane (Age 12) is the main protagonist of the book. He is a Fixer in The Seems and is called in to Fix the Glitch when it breaks out and attacks the Department of Sleep.
- Simly Frye is a young Seemsian who helps Becker as the Briefer of the Mission. In the book, he discovers his 7th sense which tells him when something is going wrong in The Seems even though Seemsians are thought to be unable to have the 7th sense.
- Jenifer Kaley is Becker's chosen Mission within a Mission (MIM), someone a Fixer remembers for motivation during a Mission. At the end of the book, Becker gives Jenifer a dream to compensate for one he destroyed during his Mission.
- Casey Lake is another Fixer who was the Fixer of Becker's last Mission as a Briefer and helps along to catch the Glitch.
- The Glitch of Sleep is the main antagonist in the book. The glitch survived the Clean Sweep Mission when The Seems destroyed every Glitch they could find. In the end, the glitch is found and shipped to Seemsberia, the prison in The Seems.

=== Plot ===
In the beginning, the Village of Covas, Minho, Portugal is experiencing a severe drought. In reality however, a Rain Tower where water is stored in The Seems, another world that controls our World, had been blocked by the Tide. Anytime a problem occurs in The Seems, a special team is called in consisting of one Briefer and one Fixer. They are both highly trained professionals at Fixing any problems. To get the Rain back, Fixer Cassiopeia (Casey) Lake and Briefer Becker Drane are called in. For his exceptional Fix, Briefer Drane is promoted to Fixer #37.

Five weeks later, Becker, receives his first mission as Fixer at night and his Mission is to catch a Glitch destroying the Department of Sleep. Glitches are one of the most destructive problems within the Seems and were thought to have been wiped out during a Missions called the "Clean Sweep". Glitches have three hands which can easily pull wires and destroy items. They are known for being destructive and unpredictable. Quickly, Becker arrives at the Department of Sleep and meets up with his Briefer Simly Frye and they are given aware of the situation. The Glitch is causing no one in The World to get a wink of sleep due to the destruction of many of the ingredients to make a Good Night's Sleep. Soon, many Chain of Events start slipping; The Chain of Events are a complicated series of events trying to give a person the best life they can. However, with a Glitch not allowing anyone to get any sleep, a Ripple Effect could occur which would cause mass destruction to The World.

Becker, Simly and fellow Fixer Casey Lake finally find and trap the Glitch in the Master Bedroom. Using his own invention, the Helping Hand, Becker is finally able to catch the Glitch. During the battle Simly finds his 7th sense, a set of chills that were sent down from his arms to his toes that told him where the Glitch was hiding even though it is thought that Seemsian's can not develop a 7th sense. After fixing up whatever destruction the Glitch caused in the Master Bedroom, everyone hopes that the Good Night Sleeps have been sent on time. However, the team might have been too late, with a warning that the Chain of Events are dissembling and the Ripple Effect about to commence in thirty seconds. With 3 seconds left, the Ripple Effect was successful reverted with enough Good Night Sleeps getting out.

In the epilogue a few Fixers have gathered together and are celebrating the successful Fix of the Glitch when Casey arrives with bad news. Someone has just stolen 50 trays of Frozen Moments, ice cubes made up of one period of one person's life. Although this alone is not to panic, if the Frozen moments are combined with Fertilizer from the Department of Nature and a Second, a Time Bomb could be made.

== Publication history ==
The Glitch in Sleep was first published in the US and UK as a hardcover on September 18, 2007. About two months later the audiobook version was released on November 1, 2007. The paperback was released along with a new cover on August 19, 2008. On July 7, 2008 a new cover was again released as a paperback.

== Themes ==
The main theme running throughout the story as review from VOYA noted is "suffering and its purpose in the world." The review notes how although many of the older kids will not buy the Bed Bugs, they serve a meaningful purpose. The Bed Bugs can show how suffering is still necessary just like how the Nightmare like qualities of the dream needed a scary moment before jumping into the happy parts.

== Critical reception ==
The Glitch in Sleep has been well reviewed by many critics. Publishers Weekly said the book has a "high sense of adventure and an abundance of goofball humor". It also praised how "the authors use the conceit to the fullest, creating a complex and intricate world with a sometimes daunting array of gadgets, bureaucracy, vocabulary and capitalization (a glossary is included—and welcome)" yet at the same time "these details don't become overwhelming, fortunately, thanks to the book's consistently lighthearted tone".Booklist praised the audiobook version read by Oliver Wyman, saying his performance "brings humor, excitement, and an occasional satirical twist to scenes involving the fascinating alternative universe". Booklist also praised the book calling the Glitch in Sleep an imaginative series. The New York Times commented how the book can be read just for fun or could also be "mulled over for its implied questions about big philosophical issues". A reviewer from School Library Journal wrote "This is a rollicking tale" and praised the characters while comparing it to Garth Nix's"The Keys to the Kingdom" series and also writing "this story is upbeat and full of humor, seeming to draw a novel from David Wiesner's Sector 7"

=== Awards and recognitions ===
The Glitch in Sleep was nominated for the Dorothy Canfield Fisher Award, a Vermont children’s choice award. It was also chosen as one on Amazon's Best Books of 2007 along with nine other books and was also named as an Autumn Book Sense Children's pick in 2007. The Glitch in Sleep was also in Publishers Weekly "BEA 2007: Fall Titles to Watch" list.

== Movie ==
Film rights to the first book have been acquired by Twentieth Century Fox, but no release has been yet planned. The movie will be directed by Shawn Levy who also directed Night at the Museum and Night at the Museum: Battle of the Smithsonian. Levy first decided to make a movie when he read the book and loved it. He later met up with John Hulme and Michael Wexler during one of their tours to show them what the movie would look like. Levy stated he wanted to produce the movie since

"This is such a visually original and fresh world, where memory, weather, sleep and things like that are created.I've been working with Fox to find the next major all-audience franchise, and we feel that if we nail the screenplay, this has the potential to fit that bill, with the same humor, family friendliness, and lack of condescension."

This story was also on the cover of the magazine Variety.
