= The Lost Train of Thought =

2009 novel by John Hulme

- Author: John Hulme and Michael Wexler
- Language: English
- Series: The Seems
- Genre: Fantasy novel
- Publisher: Bloomsbury Publishing
- Publication date: October 1, 2009
- Publication place: United States
- Media type: Print (Hardback & Paperback)
- Preceded by: The Split Second
- Followed by: A Better Place

The Lost Train of Thought is the third novel in The Seems series and was released on October 1, 2009 by Bloomsbury Publishing. It was written by John Hulme and Michael Wexler. It follows Becker Drane, a Fixer for The Seems on his last Mission as a Fixer to retrieve a train filled with Thought that went missing. Raw Thought is imported into The World to allow us to think for ourselves.

== Plot ==
The third and final book on The Seems begins with Becker Drane on trial against his breaking the Golden Rule. The Golden Rule forbids any employee that has had access a person's Case File to communicate with them. At the end of The Split Second, Becker Drane came in contact with Jenifer Kaley who he got her Case File in The Glitch in Sleep. When tried, he was found guilty on all counts. He was suspended from duty for one year, unremembered of Jenifer Kaley and has his Seems Credit Card revoked. Jenifer Kaley and Benjamin Drane will also be unremembered of all they know about The Seems.

When about to tell Jenifer about his punishment, Simly, Becker's favorite Briefer calls Becker in for a Mission. He along with the Octogenarian, Shahzad Hassan and Jelani Blaque are called in as a second team to find a missing train of Thought that was supposed to supply The World with enough Thought for the next six weeks. When Thought was first discovered, it was debated on how it should be used. Some felt the Raw Thought should be given directly to the people of the World while others felt it should be processed first. It was decided for Raw Thought to be given to people in The World so they can think for themselves. However, without Thought to keep emotions such as Jealousy and Anger in, the Unthinkable could occur causing mass destruction to The World. The first team consisted of Li Po, Casey Lake, Lisa Simms and Greg the Journeyman, but they went missing when a sudden bright light appeared.

The second team go into The Middle of Nowhere in hope of finding the Train and if possible, rescuing the missing Fixers of the first team. The team first makes a pit stop at Seemsberia, the prison in The Seems where Blaque asks Thibadeau, a previous member of the Tide a few questions. The Tide is an organization trying to overthrow the current order of The Seems. Meanwhile the team manages to find Lisa Simms and Greg the Journeyman, but Li Po and Casey Lake are still missing.

Meanwhile, in The Seems, The Tide has taken over many major departments of The Seems and even Seemsberia. To rescue The Seems, Freck reveals he is a double agent for The Seems and gets the help of the Glitches in exchange for a place to live. The Glitches succeed in destroying The Tide and recapture The Seems, but the Unthinkable is about to occur. All the extra Thought was used during the siege to The Seems.

In the Middle of Nowhere, the team along with Casey Lake has found the lost Train of Thought. However, the natives of the Middle of Nowhere have trapped all the Fixers except Becker who is trying to get the train back to The Seems. With the so little time left before the Unthinkable occurs, Becker has no choice to use the In-Betweener, an automated freight line previously used to pile wares. Becker succeeds, but is lost when the Train crashes into the entrance of the In-Betweener. With the Thought delivered and The Tide defeated, the Unthinkable does not occur.

Two days later, Freck is cleared of all charges by the new Second in Command, Samuel Hightower, who is also Triton, leader of The Tide. Despite wanting to recreate The World, he now feels that The World will now grow into a new place after all that happened in the last few days.

In the epilogue, Becker finds himself swimming through an ocean and finally arriving on a beach. On the beach, he meets Li Po, the only Fixer in the first team never to be found. Po talks although his Vow of Silence prevented him before. Becker suddenly realizes he is in A Better Place, where people go when they die.

== Critical reception ==
The Lost Train of Thought was mainly well received by reviewers. One reviewer criticized the book complaining how "Readers need to really invest all their energies into keeping track of this alternate universe while at the same time possessing enough experiences with language and idioms to get their double meanings in an instant while whizzing through the action." In the end, the reviewer felt that some readers may like the book, but not many. Another review was more positive. The reviewer says the book "has it all: adventure, action, charm, humor." Although they liked the book, they felt the first two books were better.
