= The Seems =

Children's novel series

- The Glitch in Sleep; The Split Second; The Lost Train of Thought; A Better Place
- Author: John Hulme and Michael Wexler
- Publisher: Bloomsbury
- Published: 2007–present

The Seems is a children's novel series by John Hulme and Michael Wexler. The series follows the character of Becker Drane, age 12, living in a world called "The Seems"; in the series, The Seems world is responsible for the protection of the reader's "reality" (that is, planet Earth). The series currently includes The Glitch in Sleep, published in 2007, The Split Second, published in 2008, and The Lost Train of Thought, published in 2009. A fourth book, called A Better Place, has been confirmed, but no release date has been announced yet.

== Synopsis ==
The series follows Becker Drane, a Fixer for a world called The Seems, which provides our world with resources such as Sleep, Time and Energy.

In the first book, Becker Drane must find and capture a Glitch wreaking havoc in the Department of Sleep. Glitches are creatures with three arms that are able to move very quickly, creating problems wherever they go. With the help of Briefer Simly Frye and Fixer Casey Lake, the three try to Fix this Glitch. After many challenges, Becker manages to find and capture the Glitch.

In the second book, The Tide, using 50 trays of Frozen Moments, has managed to construct a Time Bomb which could cause unimaginable damage to both The World and The Seems. The Fixers are not able prevent the explosion, and Essence is spilled into the World. Becker Drane, Fixer No. 37, is sent in to recover the bomb, which could still be hazardous. Tom Jackal, Fixer No. 7, who was thought to be dead, Fixes the bomb but dies in the process. Becker also breaks the Golden Rule, which forbids anyone with access to a Case File for a person in The World to have contact with that person.

In the third book, Becker is found guilty of breaking the Golden Rule by meeting with Jennifer Kaley at the end of The Split Second. Because of this, he is suspended from duty for a year, and his memories of Jennifer are "unremembered". Jennifer is also unremembered of everything about The Seems. However, before they are both unremembered, a train of Thought goes missing and Becker is called in with three other Fixers to find it. The train is found, and Becker must drive it back. However, all the extra Thought that The Seems had was spent already. To get The World the Thought it needs, Becker drives through to the Inbetweener. He succeeds in getting the Thought back, but he crashes into the dangerously low entrance and may not have survived. Jennifer receives a job in The Seems, but at Becker's request, she is still unremembered about Becker and The Seems.

A fourth book, titled A Better Place, has been confirmed on the official website for the series. "Chapter Zero" of the book was made available to read in May 2012, but as of April 2019, no release date or cover have been revealed. However, as of August 2018, the authors have continued to indicate that they are working on getting it released eventually.

== Themes ==
In the first book, "suffering and its purpose in the world" serves as one of the themes. A review of the first installment has noted the meaningful purpose of the Bed Bugs, despite many of the older child characters' refusal to purchase them. It has been suggested that the Bed Bug characters show that suffering is a necessary aspect of existence, with Nightmares used as an analogy in the novel; authors Hulme and Wexler portray dreams that require the occurrence of scary elements before the pleasant content takes place.

In an article in the Children's Book Examiner, Diane Bloom wrote: "The Seemsians, especially our protagonist Becker Drane, have strong ethics, remain true to their goals and do the right thing, and they understand and buy into doing your part for society and following the rules that accompany life."

== Reception ==
The series has been well reviewed. Publishers Weekly said that "the authors use the conceit to the fullest, creating a complex and intricate world with a sometimes daunting array of gadgets, bureaucracy, vocabulary and capitalization (a glossary is included—and welcome)" yet at the same time "these details don't become overwhelming, fortunately, thanks to the book's consistently lighthearted tone". A review by Booklist praised the audiobook version and described the series as very imaginative.

Newsday commented that the book can be read just for fun or can also be "mulled over for its implied questions about big philosophical issues". In a review in School Library Journal, the first book was called "a rollicking tale"; the review praised the characters while comparing it to Garth Nix's "The Keys to the Kingdom" series.

The second book also received many positive reviews. Another review from School Library Journal praised the audiobook version but commented that background information would be needed for new readers.

Booklist said that the second book was just as good as the first and has an "ingenious setting". However, Kirkus Reviews criticized the book's predictability.

=== Awards ===
The first book, The Glitch in Sleep, was nominated for the Dorothy Canfield Fisher Award and a Vermont children's choice award. It was also chosen as one of Amazon's Best Books of the Year (2007) for "Middle Readers" (older children) along with nine other books. It was also named an Autumn Book Sense Children's pick in 2007.

The second book ranked fifth on a list of the 20 best books for middle schoolers in 2008 by reviewer Diane Bloom.

== TV series ==
On August 20, 2014, John Hulme and Michael Wexler used the official Facebook page for The Seems to announce a partnership with Six Point Harness, in which an animated half-hour TV series would be produced. However, there was no further news, and the post was deleted from the page at some point after April 12, 2015. As of April 2019, the status of the TV series remains unclear.

== Film adaption ==
Film rights to the first book have been acquired by Twentieth Century Fox, but no release has been yet planned. The film will be directed by Shawn Levy, who directed Night at the Museum and Night at the Museum: Battle of the Smithsonian. Levy first decided to make a film when he read the book and loved it. He later met up with John Hulme and Michael Wexler during one of their book tours to show them what the film would look like. This story was also on the cover of the magazine Variety. Shawn Levy said:

"This is such a visually original and fresh world, where memory, weather, sleep and things like that are created. I've been working with Fox to find the next major all-audience franchise, and we feel that if we nail the screenplay, this has the potential to fit that bill, with the same humor, family friendliness, and lack of condescension."
