= Emma Mackey =

British and French actress (born 1996)

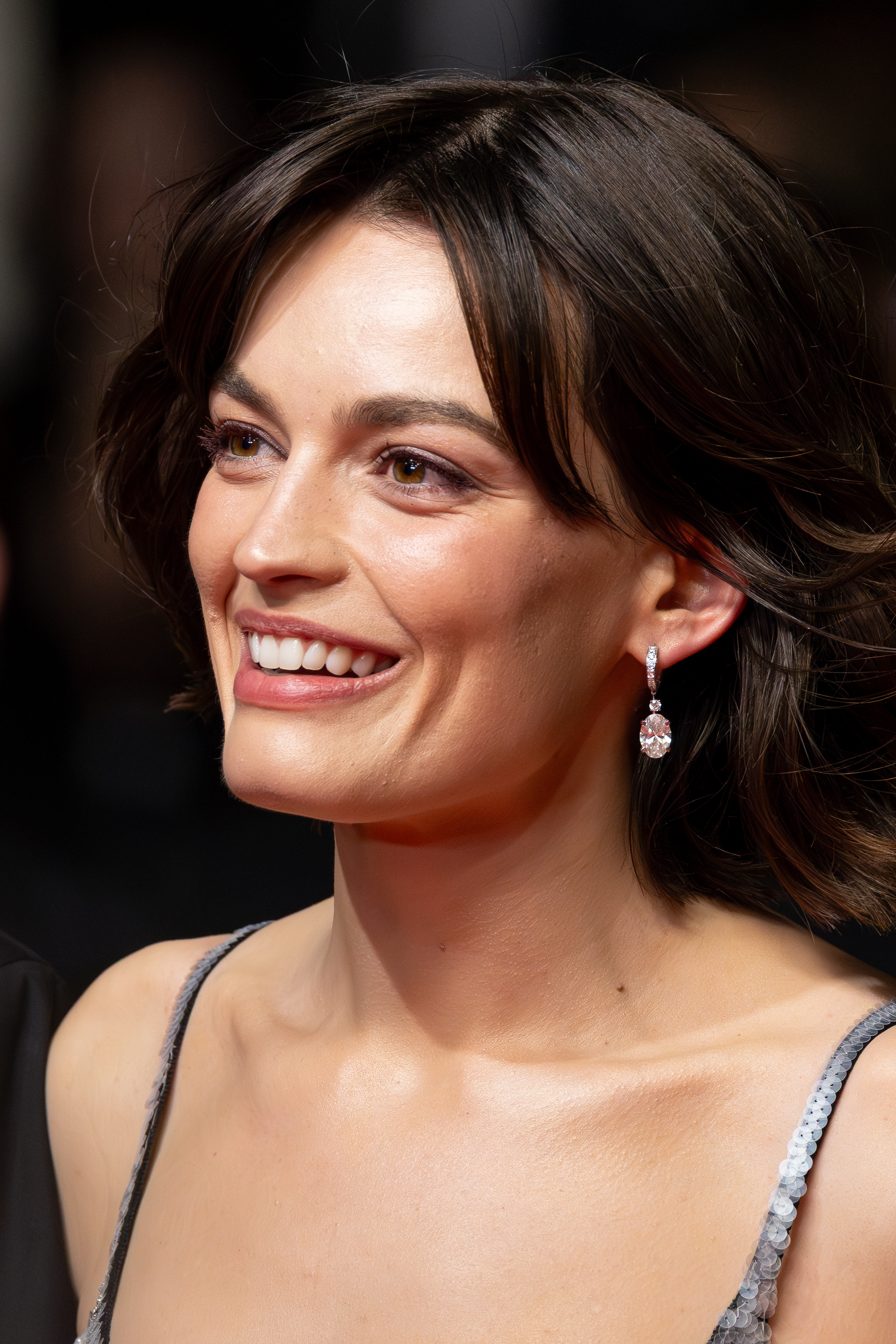
- Mackey in 2025
- Born: Emma Margaret Marie Tachard-Mackey; 4 January 1996 (age 30); Le Mans, France
- Citizenship: United Kingdom; France
- Education: University of Leeds (BA)
- Occupation: Actress
- Years active: 2016–present

Emma Margaret Marie Tachard-Mackey (born 4 January 1996) is a British-French actress. She is widely known for her breakthrough performance as troubled teenager Maeve Wiley in the Netflix comedy-drama series Sex Education (2019–2023) which earned her the nomination for the British Academy Television Award.

Mackey has since starred in the mystery film Death on the Nile (2022) and portrayed Emily Brontë in the drama film Emily (2022). She won the BAFTA Rising Star Award in 2023.

== Early life and education ==
Tachard-Mackey was born 4 January 1996 in Le Mans, the daughter of a French father and an English mother. Her father is a school headmaster. She grew up in Sablé-sur-Sarthe, and received her baccalauréat in 2013 in l'académie de Nantes, a French school district, subsequently moving to England to study English language and literature at the University of Leeds. She graduated in 2016.

== Career ==
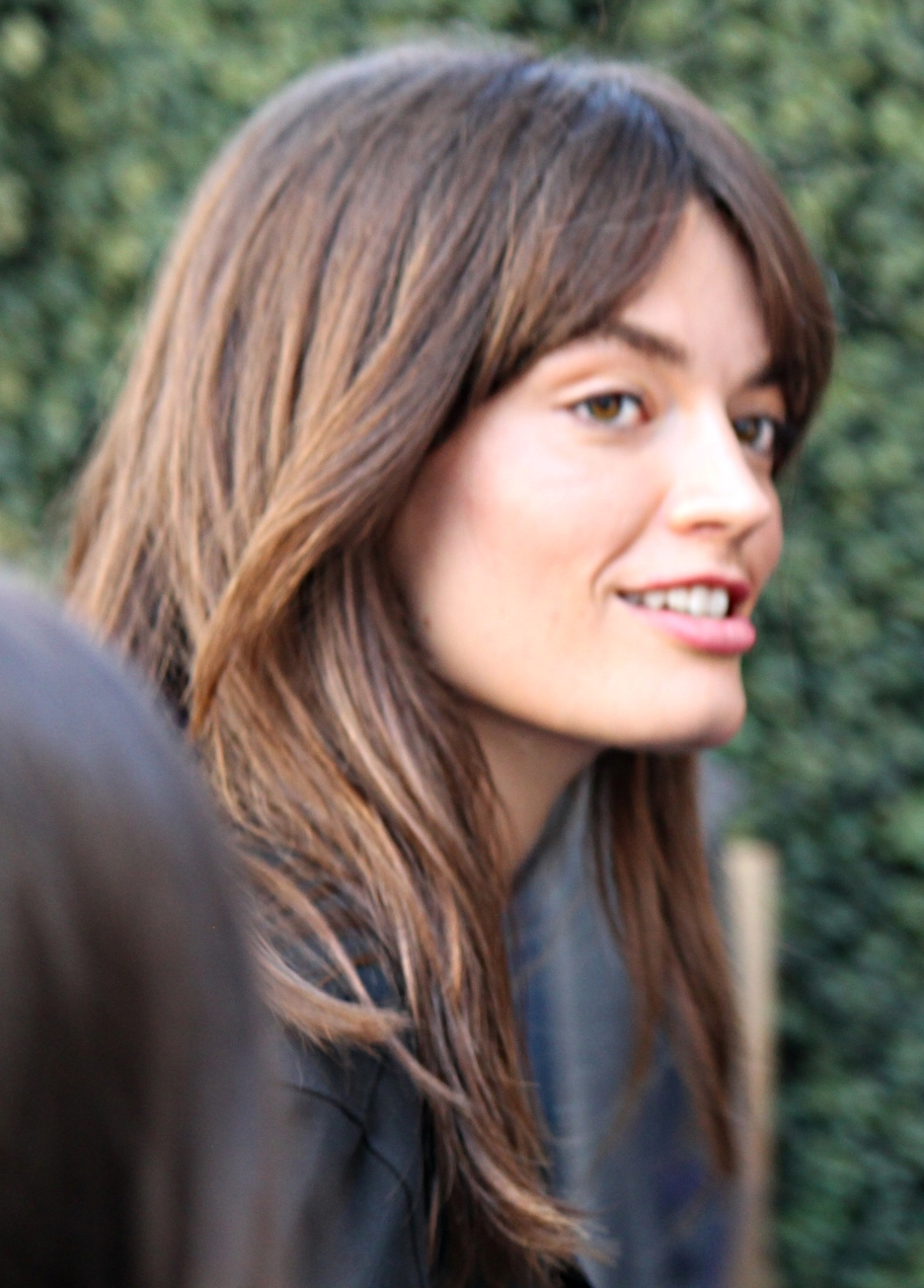
Mackey at the premiere of Emily during the 2022 Toronto International Film Festival

Mackey was cast in her first professional role with the Netflix comedy-drama series Sex Education as Maeve Wiley, an intelligent, quick-witted, business-savvy "bad girl" who persuades fellow student Otis Milburn (Asa Butterfield) to start an underground sex therapy business at their school. She said, "For me, this is my first piece of work ... It was—and still is—a really happy time." Mackey's work on the series earned her acclaim. The Hindustan Times wrote, "Emma Mackey, as Maeve, is a revelation; perhaps the best performance by a young British actress I've seen since I discovered Florence Pugh. She's alluring yet distant, pragmatic yet emotional, whip-smart yet foolishly in love." For the role, she received a British Academy Television Award nomination in 2021 and won a National Comedy Award in 2022.

In 2021, Mackey appeared in the independent romantic drama film Eiffel, which premiered at the Alliance Française French Film Festival and earned numerous international theatrical releases; it grossed $13.6 million worldwide. Review site DoItInParis wrote that Mackey "radiates mischief in the boots of a rebellious and entire provincial bourgeoisie, a bit capricious but madly endearing." In 2022, she starred in the mystery thriller film Death on the Nile, a sequel to 2017's Murder on the Orient Express, in the supporting role of Jacqueline de Bellefort. Mackey had her first lead film role as the novelist Emily Brontë in the partly fictional 2022 film Emily, focusing on Brontë's early life. In 2023, she appeared in the fantasy comedy film Barbie and became the brand ambassador for Burberry's Goddess perfume, in print and commercials. in 2025, she played the title role in the romantic comedy Ella McCay, directed by James L. Brooks. In April 2025, Mackey was cast as the White Witch in Greta Gerwig's 2026 adaptation of The Magician's Nephew, the sixth book in The Chronicles of Narnia series.

== Personal life ==
Mackey lives in London as a dual French-British citizen.

== Filmography ==
Key
| † | Denotes films that have not yet been released |

=== Film ===
| Year | Title | Role | Notes | Ref. |
|---|---|---|---|---|
| 2020 | Tic | Jess | Short film | |
| 2020 | The Winter Lake | Holly | | |
| 2021 | Eiffel | Adrienne Bourgès | | |
| 2022 | Death on the Nile | Jacqueline de Bellefort | | |
| 2022 | Emily | Emily Brontë | | |
| 2023 | Barbie | Physicist Barbie | | |
| 2025 | Hot Milk | Sofia | | |
| 2025 | Alpha | Infirmière | | |
| 2025 | Ella McCay | Ella McCay | | |
| 2026 | Full Phil | The girl from the Marais | | |
| 2027 | Narnia: The Magician's Nephew † | Jadis | Post-production | |
| 2027 | The Great Beyond † | TBA | Post-production | |
| TBA | Peaked † | TBA | Filming | |

=== Television ===
| Year | Title | Role | Notes | Ref. |
|---|---|---|---|---|
| 2016 | Badger Lane | Michelle | TV short film | |
| 2019–2023 | Sex Education | Maeve Wiley | Main role; 32 episodes | |

== Awards and nominations ==
| Year | Award | Category | Nominated work | Result | Ref. |
|---|---|---|---|---|---|
| 2021 | British Academy Television Awards | Best Female Comedy Performance | Sex Education | Nominated | |
| 2022 | National Comedy Awards | Outstanding Comedy Actress | Sex Education | Won | |
| 2022 | British Independent Film Awards | Best Lead Performance | Emily | Nominated | |
| 2022 | British Independent Film Awards | Best Ensemble Performance (Note: Shared with Amelia Gething, Oliver Jackson-Cohen, Fionn Whitehead, Alexandra Dowling, Gemma Jones, and Adrian Dunbar) | Emily | Nominated | |
| 2023 | British Academy Film Awards | BAFTA Rising Star Award | —N/a | Won | |
| 2023 | National Film Awards UK | Best Actress | Emily | Nominated | |

== See also ==
- List of British actors
