= Kerrie Hayes =

English actress

- Born: Liverpool, England
- Occupation: Actress
- Years active: 2007–present

Kerrie Hayes is an English actress.

== Early life and education ==
Born and brought up in Anfield, Liverpool, Kerrie Hayes is one of five siblings. She has two older sisters and two younger brothers.

She attended Holly Lodge Girls' College in West Derby, where her interest in acting began after she joined a drama class with her sister, and later Liverpool Community College.

== Career ==
Hayes made her professional and television debut in BBC drama Lilies, playing the lead role of Ruby Moss. She has made guest appearances in Holby City, The Commander, Casualty, Inspector George Gently and four episodes of Doctors.

Hayes' film credits include Sparkle (2007), Nowhere Boy (2009), Kicks (2009), playing the lead role of Nicole, and Rowan Joffé's remake of Brighton Rock (2010).

She was selected for the 2009 Trailblazer showcase, an annual initiative at the Edinburgh International Film Festival highlighting new talent, for her performance in Kicks. She has appeared in two series of the Channel 4 period drama The Mill for which she was nominated for the Bafta award for Leading Actress. She portrayed Gwen Pearce in the 2016 BBC TV drama series The Living and the Dead.

== Filmography ==
=== Film ===
Year	Title	Role	Notes
2007	Sparkle	(unknown)	Uncredited role
2008	Flick	Young Sue	
2009	Kicks	Nicole	
2009	Nowhere Boy	Marie's Friend	
2010	Brighton Rock	Borstal Girl 1	
2011	Tribe	Ann	
2013	Traveller	Ann	
2014	Demob	(unknown)	Short films
2014	Serious Swimmers	Gail	Short films
2015	Schrödinger's Waltz	Dead/Alive	Short films
2016	The Laughing King	Maddie	Short films
2019	Diversion	Sal	Short films
2022	Blue Jean	Vivian Highton	

=== Television ===
Year	Title	Role	Notes
2007	Lilies	Ruby Moss	Series regular. Miniseries; Episodes 1–8
2007	Holby City	Belinda Swift	Episode: "Dust Off Your Wings"
2008	The Commander: Abduction	Sharon Davis	TV film
2008	Doctors	Poppy Taylor	Series 10; 4 episodes
2010	Casualty	Poppy Wells	Episode: "Die and Let Live"
2010	D.O.A.	Sharon Selby	TV film
2010	Inspector George Gently	Elizabeth Higgs	Episode: "Peace & Love"
2011	Shameless	Bex	Episode: "My Name Is Avril"
2011	Black Mirror	Glee	Episode: "Fifteen Million Merits"
2012	Room at the Top	Marla	Miniseries; Episode 2
2012	Good Cop	Amanda Morgan	Miniseries; Episodes 1–4
2013–2014	The Mill	Esther Price	Series regular. Series 1 & 2; 10 episodes
2016	The Living and the Dead	Gwen Pearce	Series regular. Series 1; Episodes 1–6
2017	Vera	Alice Wyatt	Episode: "Natural Selection"
2017	Little Boy Blue	Sandra Oxley	Miniseries; Episodes 1–4
2017	Three Girls	DC Nina Prentiss	Miniseries; Episodes 2 & 3
2017	The Frankenstein Chronicles	Queenie	Recurring role. Series 2; 4 episodes
2020	The English Game	Doris Platt	Series regular. Series 1; Episodes 1–6
2020	Tin Star	D.I. Sara Lunt	Series regular. Series 3; Episodes 1–6
2022, 2024	The Responder	Ellie Mullen	Series 1 & 2; 4 episodes
2024	Criminal Record	Jenny Whitlow	Series 1; 3 episodes
2024	Showtrial	PC Becky Hollis	Series 2; 3 episodes
2025	Silent Witness	Faith Oscott	Series 28; Episodes 5 & 6
2025	Maigret	Sgt. Andrea Lucas	Series 1; 6 episodes
2026	Falling	Bianca	Miniseries; Episode 1
2026	The Party	Rachel Samuels	5 episodes

== Awards and nominations ==
Year	Award	Category	Work	Result	Ref.
2014	British Academy Television Awards	Best Actress	The Mill	Nominated	
2022	British Independent Film Awards	Best Supporting Performance	Blue Jean	Won	
