= The Mill (TV series) =

- Genre: Period drama
- Based on: Quarry Bank Mill
- Written by: John Fay
- Directed by: James Hawes
- Country of origin: United Kingdom
- Original language: English
- No. of series: 2
- No. of episodes: 10

Production
- Executive producers: Emily Dalton Dominic Barlow; Julian Ware
- Producers: Caroline Levy (Series 1); Johnathan Young (Series 2)
- Running time: 60 minutes (inc. adverts)
- Production company: Darlow Smithson Productions

Original release
- Network: Channel 4
- Release: 28 July 2013 – 24 August 2014

The Mill is a 2013 period television drama broadcast on Britain's Channel 4. It was developed by Emily Dalton using stories from the archives of the National Trust Property. It is based on real-life stories and people of the textile mill workers at Quarry Bank Mill in Cheshire, England, combined with fictional characters and events. The programme is also filmed in Cheshire.

The first series, written by John Fay, is set in 1830s Britain during the Industrial Revolution. It was directed by James Hawes and produced by Caroline Levy.

The second and final series, which began airing on 20 July 2014, is set between 1838 and 1842, four years after the first series. The series was cancelled by Channel 4 in 2014, leaving the story unfinished.

== Plot ==
The Mill tells the story of life in Quarry Bank Mill in Cheshire during the 1830s through the eyes of central characters, Esther Price and Daniel Bate. Esther is played by Kerrie Hayes and is a young millworker who risks her own position to stand up for justice. Daniel is played by Matthew McNulty and is a progressive young engineer with a troubled past. Based on the extensive historical archive of Quarry Bank Mill in Cheshire and real people's lives, the series depicts Britain at a time when the industrial revolution is changing the country beyond recognition. The series deals with themes of worker's rights, safety in millwork, child labour laws and the political movement to improve these conditions.

== Production ==
Some of the exteriors were filmed at the Quarry Bank Mill while others in the city centre of Chester and at Chester Crown Court. Interiors of the work in the mill were filmed in Manchester because "the real factory floor couldn’t be easily converted from its contemporary function as a museum". Additional filming was completed in the village of Styal and at MediaCityUK in Salford.

== Cast ==
The cast include:

- Donald Sumpter – Quarry Bank's founder, Samuel Greg
- Barbara Marten – Samuel's wife, Hannah Greg (née Lightbody)
- Jamie Draven – Samuel and Hannah's son, Robert Greg
- Andrew Lee Potts – another son, William Greg
- Rosilyn Ann Southgate – Mill apprentice
- Matthew McNulty – Daniel Bate
- Kerrie Hayes – Esther Price
- Katherine Rose Morley – Lucy Garner
- Holly Lucas – Susannah Catterall
- Sope Dirisu - Peter Gardner
- Mark Frost - John Howlett
- Ciarán Griffiths – Matthew Boon
- Craig Parkinson – Charlie Crout
- Sacha Parkinson – Miriam Catterall
- Kevin McNally – Mr Timperley
- Aidan McArdle – John Doherty
- Morgan Watkins – George Windell

== Series overview ==
Series	Episodes	Originally released	
Series	Episodes	First released	Last released
1	4	28 July 2013	18 August 2013
2	6	20 July 2014	24 August 2014

== Episodes ==
=== Series 1 (2013) ===
No.	Title	Directed by	Written by	Original release date	UK viewers (millions)
1	"Clock-in"	James Hawes	John Fay	28 July 2013	3.45
In the 1830s, a third of the workforce at Quarry Bank are apprentices: many are orphaned youngsters in workhouses required to labor for the Gregs, the mill owners, in return for meager board and care. Ruthless overseer Charlie Crout forces apprentice Miriam to leave the factory floor with him against her will. His absence leads to a serious accident, but can the apprentices risk sticking together to reveal Crout's negligence to the patriarchal mill owner, Samuel Greg? A few miles away in Manchester—ahead of his appearance before the Parliamentary Commission on factory legislation—Samuel's ambitious son Robert Greg visits a debtors prison, where he recruits young mechanic Daniel Bate, who is talented but has been blacklisted for political activity.
2	"Order in Court"	James Hawes	John Fay	4 August 2013	2.85
Esther Price arrives at court in Manchester after assaulting her overseer, Charlie Crout. On the assumption that she will be found guilty, Mr Timperley has been sent to the workhouse in Liverpool to collect a replacement apprentice. He returns with two sisters, Lucy and Catherine Garner. But it's soon clear that Catherine is too weak to work and the Gregs must decide whether they should split the sisters up and send Catherine back to the workhouse. Susannah Catterall begins to work alongside the charismatic young engineer Daniel Bate but they don't get off to a good start. Hannah Greg attends an abolitionist meeting where the speaker, freed slave Mary Prince, outlines the shocking reality of slavery first-hand. But political campaigner John Doherty is there, and is determined to portray Hannah as a hypocrite.
3	"On the run"	James Hawes	John Fay	11 August 2013	2.72
Esther and Lucy head for Liverpool, chased by Timperley, but discover that Lucy's sister Catherine never returned to the workhouse. Meanwhile, back at Quarry Bank, Daniel and Susannah show political activist John Doherty's pamphlet – which attacks the Gregs – to the apprentices, revealing some of Daniel's more radical beliefs. Esther visits churches in Liverpool, hoping to find information that will confirm her age and help her find her family. And when Robert finds out who the father of Susannah's child is, he arranges to move her to another mill, separating her from her two siblings, so Daniel makes an impulsive offer so that she can stay at the Mill.
4	"Bide our time"	James Hawes	John Fay	18 August 2013	2.66
Lucy and Esther are convinced that Mr Timperley is responsible for Catherine's disappearance. They're determined to expose him but are blocked at every turn. Meanwhile, in Liverpool, Esther's sister Martha finds one of the notes Esther left there and travels to Quarry Bank Mill in the hope of finding her. Robert arrives back at the Mill bearing the news that parliament has not passed the Ten Hour Bill, meaning children will continue to work 12-hour days. As political unrest escalates, Robert attempts to keep Daniel on his side by offering him a half-share in the patent of their new loom, but Daniel's loyalty is tested when John Doherty digs for more dirt on the Gregs and calls a key union meeting.

=== Series 2 (2014) ===
No.	Title	Directed by	Written by	Original release date	UK viewers (millions)
1	"A Good Mechanic"	Susan Tully	John Fay	20 July 2014	2.34
2	"Episode 2"	Susan Tully	John Fay	27 July 2014	2.13
3	"Episode 3"	Bill Anderson	Ian Kershaw & Debbie Oates	3 August 2014	1.85
4	"Surprise Visitor"	Bill Anderson	Alice Nutter	10 August 2014	1.80
5	"Episode 5"	Bill Anderson	Steven Fay & Tony Green	17 August 2014	1.74
6	"Episode 6"	Bill Anderson	John Fay	24 August 2014	1.68

== Reception ==
The first episode of Series 1 was aired on the evening of 28 July 2013. The series was well received among UK viewers but received mixed reviews due to its controversial storylines and characters.

Grace Dent of The Independent described it as "so bloody serious, so dry, so gritty Bafta, so bang-you-around-the-head worthy" that she could not describe the first 10 minutes "without laughing". Arifa Akbar, also at The Independent, compared its social realism with the BBC's The Village but noted the plot nevertheless had sufficient intrigue and promise to keep an audience interested. Ceri Radford in The Telegraph summarised it as: "Take every cliché you can think of about the Industrial Revolution, mix them all up into one gloomy morass of woe, and that's pretty much last night's opening."
