= 7 Miles Out =

2026 British drama film

- Directed by: Carol Morley
- Screenplay by: Carol Morley
- Based on: 7 Miles Out by Carol Morley
- Produced by: Cairo Cannon
- Starring: Lucy Halliday; Aidan Gillen; Gemma Whelan
- Cinematography: Agnès Godard
- Edited by: Raluca Petre
- Music by: Carly Paradis
- Production companies: Cannon and Morley Productions; Revolution Films
- Release date: 17 October 2026 (BFI)
- Running time: 127 minutes
- Country: United Kingdom
- Language: English

7 Miles Out is a 2026 British drama film directed by Carol Morley, starring Lucy Halliday, Aidan Gillen, and Gemma Whelan. Adaption of her semi-autobiographical eponymous novel, the film follows Anne, who, after losing her father in tragic circumstances, finds solace and trouble in the Manchester music scene of the 1970s and '80s.

The film had its world premiere at the 2026 BFI London Film Festival on 17 October 2026.

== Cast ==
- Lucy Halliday as Ann Westbourne
- Aidan Gillen as Ronald Westbourne
- Gemma Whelan as Bryn Westbourne
- Kasper Hilton-Hille as Scott Westbourne
- Hannah McIver as Susan Westbourne
- Clare Grogan as Pamela Ryan
- Jim English as Tony Wilson
- Elizabeth Meadows as Vamp
- Misha Mond as Terri
- Daisy-Mai Foden as Helen Ash (11)
- Gracie Darlington as Wendy
- Lewis McArdle as Simon

== Production ==
=== Development ===
In September 2025, it was reported that Carol Morley was developing a feature film adaptation of her semi-autobiographical novel 7 Miles Out. It was also reported that Cairo Cannon would produce the film under Cannon and Morley Productions. The film was expected to begin principal photography in November 2025, on location in Manchester.

=== Filming ===
Shot entirely on location in Stockport, Greater Manchester, by cinematographer Agnès Godard, the film unfolds over seven years. Its backdrop traces the rise of post-punk influences, including the emergence of Joy Division and the formative energy of The Haçienda, and capturing period of music and the cultural pulse of the 1970s and '80s.

=== Music ===
The film features a soundtrack that captures the musical spirit of the 1970s and 1980s, the very era in which its story unfolds.

The songs performed in the film were written by Morley and Carly Paradis, with Paradis also composing the score. The songs by the Fall, Joy Division, New Order, Magazine, the Raincoats, Nico and the Durutti Column also feature in the film.

== Release ==
7 Miles Out premiered at the 2026 BFI London Film Festival on 17 October 2026 in official competition.

== Accolades ==
Award ceremony	Date of ceremony	Category	Recipient(s)	Result	Ref.
BFI London Film Festival	18 October 2026	Best Film	7 Miles Out	Nominated	
