= The Great Hip Hop Hoax =

- Directed by: Jeanie Finlay
- Starring: Gavin Bain; Billy Boyd
- Release date: 6 September 2013
- Running time: 93 minutes
- Country: United Kingdom
- Language: English

The Great Hip Hop Hoax is a documentary film by Jeanie Finlay about a Scottish hip-hop duo called Silibil N' Brains, who pretended to be Americans to secure a £250,000 record deal with Sony. The film premiered at South by Southwest and was later shown at the Edinburgh International Film Festival, before a national theatrical release in Scotland and broadcasts on BBC Two Scotland, BBC Four, and Danish station DR2. It was pitched at Sheffield Doc/Fest's MeetMarket in 2008.

== Reception ==
The movie has received positive reviews. Both members of Silibil 'N Brains are reportedly happy with how the film turned out, though find it "bizarre" to watch with other people.

== See also ==
- California Schemin', a 2025 movie based on the same story
