= Vancouver Film Critics Circle Award for Best Supporting Actress =

Canadian film award

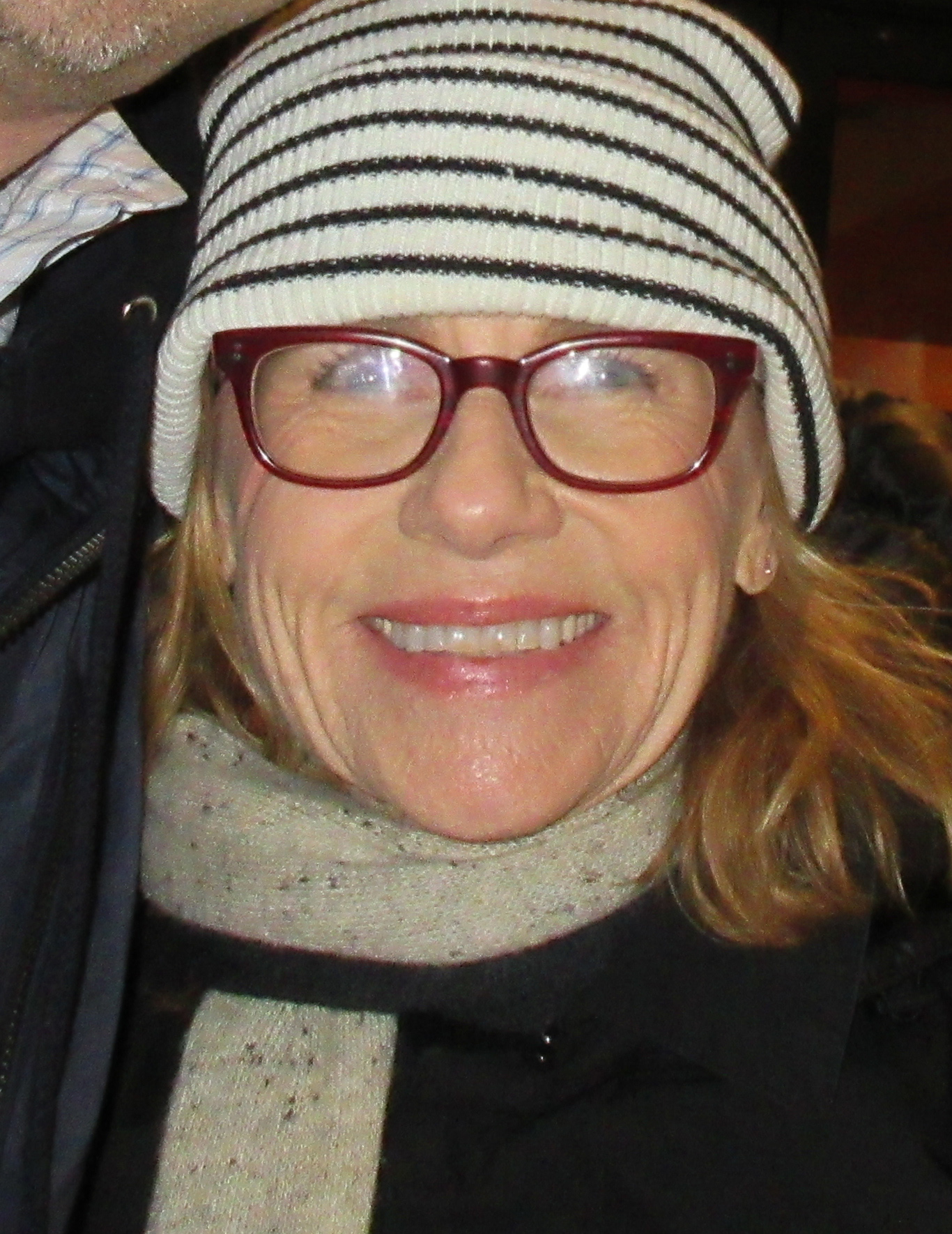
- Current recipient: Amy Madigan
- Awarded for: Best Performance by an Actress in a Supporting Role
- Country: United States
- Presented by: Vancouver Film Critics Circle
- First award: Toni Collette, The Hours (2002)
- Currently held by: Amy Madigan; Weapons (2025)
- Website: vancouverfilmcritics.com

The winners of the Vancouver Film Critics Circle Award for Best Supporting Actress are listed below.

== Winners and nominees ==
=== 2000s ===
Year	Winner and nominees	Film	Role
2002	Toni Collette	The Hours	Kitty
2002	Kathy Bates	About Schmidt	Roberta Hertzel
2002	Meryl Streep	Adaptation.	Susan Orlean
2002	Emily Watson	Punch-Drunk Love	Lena Leonard
2003	Patricia Clarkson	Pieces of April	Joy Burns
2003	Shohreh Aghdashloo	House of Sand and Fog	Nadereh "Nadi" Behrani
2003	Maria Bello	The Cooler	Natalie Belisario
2004	Virginia Madsen	Sideways	Maya Randall
2004	Cate Blanchett	The Aviator	Katharine Hepburn
2004	Cate Blanchett	Coffee and Cigarettes	Cate / Shelly
2004	Natalie Portman	Closer	Alice Ayres
2004	Natalie Portman	Garden State	Sam
2005	Amy Adams	Junebug	Ashley Johnsten
2005	Catherine Keener	Capote	Harper Lee
2005	Rachel Weisz	The Constant Gardener	Tessa Quayle
2005	Michelle Williams	Brokeback Mountain	Alma Beers-Del Mar
2006	Cate Blanchett	Notes on a Scandal	Sheba Hart
2006	Adriana Barraza	Babel	Amelia
2006	Meryl Streep	The Devil Wears Prada	Miranda Priestly
2007	Tilda Swinton	Michael Clayton	Karen Crowder
2007	Cate Blanchett	I'm Not There	Jude Quinn
2007	Amy Ryan	Gone Baby Gone	Helene McCready
2008	Rosemarie DeWitt	Rachel Getting Married	Rachel
2008	Viola Davis	Doubt	Mrs. Miller
2008	Marisa Tomei	The Wrestler	Pam / Cassidy
2009	Vera Farmiga	Up in the Air	Alex Goran
2009	Anna Kendrick	Up in the Air	Natalie Keener
2009	Mo'Nique	Precious: Based on the Novel "Push" by Sapphire	Mary Lee Johnston

=== 2010s ===
Year	Winner and nominees	Film	Role
2010	Hailee Steinfeld	True Grit	Mattie Ross
2010	Amy Adams	The Fighter	Charlene Fleming
2010	Melissa Leo	The Fighter	Alice Eklund
2011	Jessica Chastain	The Tree of Life, Take Shelter, & The Help	Mrs. O'Brien, Samantha LaForche, & Celia Foote
2011	Melissa McCarthy	Bridesmaids	Megan
2011	Shailene Woodley	The Descendants	Alex King
2012	Amy Adams	The Master	Peggy Dodd
2012	Anne Hathaway	Les Misérables	Fantine
2012	Helen Hunt	The Sessions	Cheryl
2013	Jennifer Lawrence	American Hustle	Rosalyn Rosenfeld
2013	Lupita Nyong'o	12 Years a Slave	Patsey
2013	June Squibb	Nebraska	Kate Grant
2014	Patricia Arquette	Boyhood	Olivia Evans
2014	Jessica Chastain	A Most Violent Year	Anna Morales
2014	Laura Dern	Wild	Barbara "Bobbi" Grey
2015	Alicia Vikander	Ex Machina	Ava
2015	Jennifer Jason Leigh	The Hateful Eight	Daisy Domergue
2015	Alicia Vikander	The Danish Girl	Gerda Wegener
2016	Michelle Williams	Manchester by the Sea	Randi Chandler
2016	Viola Davis	Fences	Rose Maxson
2016	Naomie Harris	Moonlight	Paula
2017	Laurie Metcalf	Lady Bird	Marion McPherson
2017	Allison Janney	I, Tonya	LaVona Golden
2017	Lesley Manville	Phantom Thread	Cyril Woodcock
2018	Rachel Weisz	The Favourite	Sarah Churchill, Duchess of Marlborough
2018	Claire Foy	First Man	Janet Armstrong
2018	Emma Stone	The Favourite	Abigail Masham, Baroness Masham
2019	Laura Dern	Marriage Story	Nora Fanshaw
2019	Jennifer Lopez	Hustlers	Ramona Vega
2019	Florence Pugh	Little Women	Amy March

=== 2020s ===
Year	Winner and nominees	Film	Role	Ref
2020	Youn Yuh-jung	Minari	Soon-ja	
2020	Maria Bakalova	Borat Subsequent Moviefilm	Tutar Sagdiyev	
2020	Amanda Seyfried	Mank	Marion Davies	
2021	Ann Dowd	Mass	Linda	
2021	Jessie Buckley	The Lost Daughter	Young Leda Caruso	
2021	Kirsten Dunst	The Power of the Dog	Rose Gordon	
2022	Jessie Buckley	Women Talking	Mariche	
2022	Kerry Condon	The Banshees of Inisherin	Siobhán Súilleabháin	
2022	Frankie Corio	Aftersun	Sophie	
2022	Jamie Lee Curtis	Everything Everywhere All at Once	Deirdre Beaubeirdre	
2022	Dolly de Leon	Triangle of Sadness	Abigail	
2022	Stephanie Hsu	Everything Everywhere All at Once	Joy Wang / Jobu Tupaki	
2022	Michelle Williams	The Fabelmans	Mitzi Fabelman	
2023	Da'Vine Joy Randolph	The Holdovers	Mary Lamb	
2023	Emily Blunt	Oppenheimer	Katherine Oppenheimer	
2023	Jodie Foster	Nyad	Bonnie Stoll	
2024	Margaret Qualley	The Substance	Sue	
2024	Monica Barbaro	A Complete Unknown	Joan Baez	
2024	Zoe Saldaña	Emilia Pérez	Rita Mora Castro	
2025	Amy Madigan	Weapons	Aunt Gladys	
2025	Elle Fanning	Sentimental Value	Rachel Kemp	
2025	Teyana Taylor	One Battle After Another	Perfidia Beverly Hills	
