= Charlotte Wells =

Scottish filmmaker

- Born: Charlotte Anna Wells; 13 June 1987 (age 39); Morningside, Edinburgh, Scotland
- Education: King's College London (BA); University of Oxford (MA); New York University (MBA/MFA)
- Occupations: Film director; film producer; screenwriter
- Years active: 2014–present
- Website: charlotte-wells.com

Charlotte Wells (born 13 June 1987) is a Scottish filmmaker. She is known for her feature film debut Aftersun (2022), which premiered in 2022 at the Cannes Film Festival, receiving 121 nominations and 33 awards, including Gotham and British Independent Film Awards. Wells has worked on numerous other films, such as Blue Christmas (2017), and her films have screened at festivals worldwide.

== Early life and education ==
Wells was born in Edinburgh, and attended secondary school at the independent George Heriot's School. Wells did not live with her father, who died when she was 16, but remembers him as a very involved parent, despite the living situation. Wells has explored the father-daughter dynamic in her filmography. She has called Aftersun an autobiographical account of her grief over her father's death.

Wells was interested in film from an early age, but did not initially pursue it. She graduated with a Bachelor of Arts in Classics from King's College London and a Master of Arts from Oxford University. She went into finance and rediscovered film through helping Callum Just, a school friend, run Digital Orchard, a post-production and DIT agency. She used this experience to apply to New York University's joint business and film graduate program with the intention of becoming a producer. She completed a dual Master of Fine Arts and Master of Business Administration at Tisch School of the Arts and the Stern School.

== Career ==
=== Early career ===
Before starting her career in the film industry as a producer, Wells helped run Digital Orchard, a company specializing in film, finishing images, developing film, and digital imaging. While enrolled at NYU, where she originally intended to be a producer, Wells wrote and directed three short films.

==== Tuesday (2015) ====
Tuesday follows a 16-year-old girl who is learning to cope with a big loss, introducing the themes of fatherhood and personal trauma characteristic of Wells's films. The girl (Megan McGill) goes to her deceased father's residence and grieves her loss. The film presumably takes place in Scotland and reflects Wells's experience of her father's death when she was 16. The film earned Wells the Best Writer Nominee at BAFTA Scotland New Talent Awards 2016.

==== Laps (2016) ====
Laps is a New York-based short film about a woman who is sexually assaulted on a crowded subway train. Like Tuesday, Laps explores a severe trauma and how life continues despite it. The handheld camera emphasizes the claustrophobic nature of the subway. The film features Thea Brooks, and earned Wells Special Jury Recognition at the SXSW Short Film Awards and Special Jury Award for Editing at Sundance 2017.

==== Blue Christmas (2017) ====
The longest of Wells's three shorts, Blue Christmas is a period piece about Alec, a Scottish debt collector in the late 1960s who goes to work on Christmas Eve instead of spending time with his wife and son, due in part to her worsening psychosis. It follows him around town as he subjects other families to displeasure at his presence and collects a television from one family. He eats dinner with one of the people he visits before going home late to see his wife trying to burn down the Christmas tree with a lit cigarette while his son tries to restrain her. The son sees Alec come in and is angry with him. Alec steps in to intervene, comforting his wife and talking her out of her episode. She drops the cigarette onto the tree as her body relaxes, burning up the tree and the rest of the room. The film's title is a reference to the song Blue Christmas. Elvis Presley's version is heard toward the end. The film features Jamie Robson and Michelle Duncan.

==== Other work ====
Wells was a fellow at the 2020 Sundance Institute Screenwriters and Directors Labs with her feature film debut Aftersun, which premiered at the 2022 Cannes Film Festival to critical acclaim. She was also a producer on the 2019 film Raf, which premiered at the 2019 Toronto International Film Festival.

=== Aftersun ===
Aftersun is a coming-of-age film that tells the story of a young woman, Sophie, recalling a holiday she took with her father, Calum (Paul Mescal), 20 years earlier, for Calum's 31st birthday. The 11-year-old Sophie (Frankie Corio) does not spend much time with her father, but they have an annual vacation together. They go to a Turkish budget resort, and each wants to bond and connect with the other, but Calum struggles with depression, creating a barrier. Adult Sophie tries to remember her father by looking back on this holiday and piecing together her memories with the help of the videos they took on the vacation.

The film is shot on 35mm film and partly by the actors themselves on a MiniDV camera. This camera is used for many of the scenes with Sophie during the holiday, including playing with friends at the resort and spending time with her father. Wells's father died when she was 16 and she lived apart from him, though she did not feel that he was uninvolved with her upbringing. The father-daughter dynamic was not something Wells initially tried to uncover in the film; it arose during its making, specifically during the screenwriting.

Aftersun received 121 nominations, and 33 awards, including the British Independent Film Award for Best Director and Best Screenplay for Wells and a nomination for Best Actor at the 2023 Academy Awards for Mescal. The National Board of Review named the film the Best Directorial Debut of 2022. Wells also received the Bingham Ray Breakthrough Director Award at the Gotham Awards and the Outstanding Debut by a British Writer, Director, or Producer at the BAFTA Awards.

=== Post-Aftersun ===
In February 2024, Wells directed her first advertisement, a video for Quaker Oats titled "You've Got This". It follows the relationship of a father and son across time, Quaker Oats connects them all through the stages of life. Wells has said that familial relationships and the passage of time are front of mind when she writes, as evidenced by the commercial and her other work.

In July 2024, Wells directed advertisements for the American Red Cross titled "What's Your Type?" and "Growing Up". The first was created with the goal of relatability and encouraging people to donate blood. After beginning with upbeat music and ordinary lighting, the commercial takes a quick turn to a hospital, where the cast is injured and sickly, in need of blood donations to save their lives. "Growing Up" was intended to target Hispanic audiences and focuses on intimate family moments. It also tells an emotional story, ending with the importance and growing necessity of blood donations.

In May 2024, Wells directed a video for Romy's song "Always Forever". The two were close to collaborating earlier in their careers, but never found the right time. The video is a departure from Wells's previous work both thematically and stylistically, but maintains some of her visual style, featuring collaborators from the club scenes in Aftersun.

Wells served as the Jury President of the Bright Horizons competition at the 2025 Melbourne International Film Festival, where Aftersun debuted in Australia in 2022 as part of the same competition in its first year. Simón Mesa Soto's A Poet won the award and its $140,000 prize. Wells also led the jury for the Luigi De Laurentiis debut film award at the 82nd Venice International Film Festival, where Nastia Korkia's Short Summer won.

== Style and themes ==
=== Traumatic personal experiences and isolation ===
Wells's films highlight personal trauma and explore how people grapple with it. In Tuesday (2015) and Aftersun (2022), that trauma is reliving the loss of a father through the eyes of his daughter, mirroring Wells's own journey with grief as a teenager. Aftersun also highlights depression. Laps (2016) is about a woman who is sexually assaulted in a crowded subway car in New York City. Despite there being dozens of people around and alert while this is happening, it goes unnoticed, leaving her alone to figure out what to do and how to respond emotionally. In Blue Christmas (2017), Wells tells the story of a man who chooses to work on Christmas Eve instead of staying to care for his wife as her psychosis worsens. He spends the whole day working, doing anything to stay out of the house and ignore everything that is unfolding inside.

Not all of Wells's films are autobiographical, but they all revolve around very specific and similar experiences of isolating personal traumas. Her characters are never truly alone, in that they have families and people to interact with, but only they experience the specific trauma, isolating them from the people around them.

=== Complex fathers ===
Most of Wells's films focus on fathers and the complexities of their lives, the one exception being Laps. Tuesday (2015) follows a teenage girl, Allie, who is grappling with the loss of her father. Wells represents him and his life through his belongings in his house. The image that emerges of him is of an interesting, dynamic man, not just Allie’s father, before it slowly becomes clear that he has passed away.

The protagonist of Blue Christmas (2017) is a husband and father, Alec, who goes to work on Christmas Eve rather than take care of his son and wife, who is in the midst of a worsening psychotic episode. The film follows Alec throughout his workday, depicting his life as a debt collector and revealing bits of a personal life separate from his family. The film paints a complex picture of Alec, attempting to understand him as more than just a father. It is revealed that he may have been unfaithful to his wife, but toward the end of the film he is shown comforting her and providing her with support.

Aftersun (2022), Wells's first feature film, expands on the theme of complex fathers through the character of Calum, a father struggling with depression. It takes place in the memories of Calum's daughter, Sophie, who is watching videos of a holiday she took with her dad when she was 11. The film foregrounds the duality of Calum’s identity as a father and a person struggling. He goes from intense sadness immediately into playful banter as soon as he sees Sophie. He works hard to hide his personhood from her in order to show up as her father, which highlights his complexities and internal struggle.

== Filmography ==
Year	Title	Credited as			Notes	Ref(s)
Year	Title	Director	Producer	Writer	Notes	Ref(s)
2014	F to 7th	No	Yes	No	TV series (8 episodes)	
2015	Tuesday	Yes	Yes	Yes	Short	
2015	In a Room Below	No	Yes	No	Short	
2016	Red Folder	No	Yes	No	Short	
2016	Briefcase	No	Yes	No	Short	
2016	Alice	No	Yes	No	Short	
2017	Laps	Yes	No	Yes	Short	
2017	Blue Christmas	Yes	No	Yes	Short	
2017	Eté	No	Yes	No	Short	
2019	I'm the One Who's Singing	No	Yes	No	Short	
2019	Raf	No	Yes	No	Feature	
2022	Aftersun	Yes	No	Yes	Feature	

== Awards and nominations ==
Year	Association	Category	Film	Result	Ref.
2016	BAFTA Awards, Scotland	New Talent Award: Best Writer	Tuesday	Nominated	style="text-align:center;"
2016	Encounters Film Festival	International Competition	Tuesday	Nominated	style= "text-align:center;"
2018	London Critics Film Festival	British/Irish Short Film of the Year	Tuesday	Nominated	style="text-align:center;"
2017	Sundance Film Festival	rowspan="5" |Laps| style="background: #FFE3E3; color: black; vertical-align: middle; text-align: center; " class="no table-no2 notheme"|Nominated| style= "text-align:center;"			
2017	SXSW Film Festival				
2017	SXSW Film Festival	style="background: #FFE3E3; color: black; vertical-align: middle; text-align: center; " class="no table-no2 notheme"|Nominated| style="text-align:center;"			
2017	SXSW Film Festival	style="background: #9EFF9E; color: #000; vertical-align: middle; text-align: center; " class="yes table-yes2 notheme"|Won| style= "text-align:center;"			
2017	Encounters Film Festival	International Competition	Nominated		
2017	Toronto International Film Festival	Best International Short Film	Blue Christmas	Nominated	
2018	Molodist Kyiv International Film Festival	International Competition: Best Student Film	Blue Christmas	Nominated	
2018	Sundance Film Festival	Short Film Grand Jury Prize	Blue Christmas	Nominated	
2018	Savannah Film Festival	Best Student Short	Blue Christmas	Won	
2022	British Independent Film Award	Best British Independent Film	Aftersun	Won	
2022	British Independent Film Award	Best Director	Aftersun	Won	
2022	British Independent Film Award	Best Screenplay	Aftersun	Won	
2022	British Independent Film Award	Best Debut Screenwriter	Aftersun	Nominated	
2022	Cannes Film Festival		Aftersun		
2022	Cannes Film Festival	Critics' Week Grand Prize	Aftersun	Nominated	
2022	Cannes Film Festival	Caméra d'Or	Aftersun	Nominated	
2022	Cannes Film Festival	French Touch Prize of the Critics' Week Grand Jury	Aftersun	Won	
2022	Gotham Independent Film Awards	Bingham Ray Breakthrough Director Award	Aftersun	Won	
2022	New York Film Critics Circle	Best First Film	Aftersun	Won	
2022	National Society of Film Critics	Best Director	Aftersun	Won	
2023	Directors Guild of America	Outstanding Directing – First-Time Feature Film	Aftersun	Won	
2023	BAFTA Awards	Outstanding Debut by a British Writer, Director or Producer	Aftersun	Won	
2023	BAFTA Awards	Outstanding British Film of the Year	Aftersun	Nominated	
2023	BAFTA Awards, Scotland		Aftersun		
2023	BAFTA Awards, Scotland	Best Director - Fiction	Aftersun	Won	
2023	BAFTA Awards, Scotland	Best Feature Film	Aftersun	Nominated	
2023	Critics' Choice Awards	Best Original Screenplay	Aftersun	Nominated	
