= Emily (2022 film) =

British film directed by Frances O'Connor

- Theatrical release poster
- Directed by: Frances O'Connor
- Written by: Frances O'Connor
- Produced by: Jo Bamford; David Barron; Robert Patterson; Piers Tempest
- Starring: Emma Mackey; Fionn Whitehead; Oliver Jackson-Cohen; Alexandra Dowling; Amelia Gething; Adrian Dunbar; Gemma Jones
- Cinematography: Nanu Segal
- Edited by: Sam Sneade
- Music by: Abel Korzeniowski
- Production companies: Embankment Films; Ingenious Media; Tempo Productions; Arenamedia
- Distributed by: Warner Bros. Pictures
- Release dates: 9 September 2022 (TIFF); 14 October 2022 (United Kingdom)
- Running time: 130 minutes
- Country: United Kingdom
- Language: English
- Box office: $3.9 million

Emily is a 2022 British biographical drama film written and directed by Frances O'Connor in her directorial debut. It is a part-fictional portrait of English writer Emily Brontë (played by Emma Mackey), concentrating on a fictional romantic relationship with the young curate William Weightman. Fionn Whitehead, Oliver Jackson-Cohen, Alexandra Dowling, Amelia Gething, Adrian Dunbar and Gemma Jones appear in supporting roles.

Emily premiered at the 2022 Toronto International Film Festival before being theatrically released in the United Kingdom by Warner Bros. Pictures on 14 October 2022.

== Plot ==
As Emily Brontë is ill and near death, her older sister Charlotte asks her what inspired her to write her novel Wuthering Heights.

Sometime in the past Charlotte, nearly graduated from school, returns home for a visit. Emily tries to talk to her about the fictional worlds she has been creating while Charlotte was at school, but Charlotte tries to dissuade her from these juvenile activities.

At the same time William Weightman, a new curate, arrives. While her sisters and several other young women seem enamoured of the young man, Emily is dismissive of him. While visiting the Brontë home, Weightman partakes in a childhood game of the Brontës in which they take turns donning a mask and impersonating a character, while other members guess who the character is. When it is Emily's turn, she claims to be possessed by the ghost of their deceased mother. Coincidentally, a strong wind bursts open the windows. Charlotte, Anne and Branwell become distressed, while Weightman is disturbed by the scene. Emily buries the mask in the ground the next day.

Emily goes with Charlotte to her school to learn to be a teacher, while her brother Branwell goes to study at the Royal Academy of Arts. Both Emily and Branwell return shortly after as failures, with Branwell proclaiming that he is now more interested in writing and Emily at a loss for what to do.

Emily's father engages Weightman to tutor Emily in French, and during their first lesson the two argue over religious philosophy. Branwell encourages Emily to drink and play, and Emily uses some opium she finds in a desk. Like Branwell, she writes "Freedom in thought" on her arm; their favourite pastime involves staring through the window of a local family and scaring them at night. Both are eventually caught, but when Emily denies her involvement, Branwell is sent to work for the family as a tutor as punishment. Branwell is caught kissing the mistress of the house and is sent elsewhere in disgrace.

Emily and Weightman grow increasingly close and begin a romantic and sexual entanglement. When Charlotte returns and begins to suspect an affinity between the two, Weightman abruptly ends their relationship. Emily is devastated and is finally honest with Branwell about his writing, telling him that his attempts at fiction are clichéd and trite. To move on with her life, Emily decides to leave with Charlotte for Brussels and tells Weightman that she no longer intends to write. Weightman writes Emily a letter urging her to change her mind, which he gives to Branwell, who reads its contents and does not pass on the message.

In Brussels, Emily has a vision of Weightman and shortly after receives news that he has died of cholera. The sisters return to tend an ailing Branwell. His final act before dying is to give Emily Weightman's letter in which he urges her to continue to write. After Branwell's death Emily writes Wuthering Heights. Now on her death bed, Emily confesses to Charlotte that she was in love with Weightman and asks Charlotte to burn the love letters between the two after she dies. Charlotte does so and begins to write her own works.

== Cast ==
- Emma Mackey as Emily Brontë
- Fionn Whitehead as Branwell Brontë
- Oliver Jackson-Cohen as William Weightman
- Alexandra Dowling as Charlotte Brontë
- Amelia Gething as Anne Brontë
- Adrian Dunbar as Patrick Brontë
- Gemma Jones as Aunt Branwell
- Gerald Lepkowski as Mr Linton
- Sacha Parkinson as Ellen Nussey

== Production ==
The film was announced in May 2020 with Emma Mackey cast in the titular role, with Joe Alwyn, Fionn Whitehead and Emily Beecham being cast as people in Emily's life. Frances O'Connor was set to write and direct the film. Both Alwyn and Beecham left the project prior to the start of filming in April 2021, with Oliver Jackson-Cohen, Alexandra Dowling, Amelia Gething, Gemma Jones and Adrian Dunbar joining the cast. Filming began in Yorkshire on 16 April 2021 and concluded on 26 May.

Warner Bros. UK distributes the film in its native United Kingdom as well as the Republic of Ireland.

== Release ==
Emily had its world premiere in the Platform Prize lineup at the 2022 Toronto International Film Festival on September 9, 2022. The film premiered at the 2022 Toronto International Film Festival before being theatrically released in the United Kingdom by Warner Bros. Pictures on 14 October 2022.

== Reception ==
=== Critical response ===
Review aggregator Rotten Tomatoes reports that 88% of 123 critics have given the film a positive review, with an average rating of 7.3 out of 10. The website's critical consensus reads, "With a bracingly irreverent approach to its story and Emma Mackey bringing Brontë vibrantly to life, Emily is a biopic that manages to feel true while taking entertaining creative liberties." Metacritic, which uses a weighted average, assigned the film a score of 75 out of 100, based on 35 critics, indicating "generally favorable reviews".

In his review for The Guardian, Peter Bradshaw describes the film as "beautifully acted, lovingly shot, fervently and speculatively imagined". Mark Kermode describes Emily as a "full-blooded gothic fable", praising O’Connor's "spine-tingling feature debut".

The film received three awards at the Dinard British Film Festival: Golden Hitchcock, Best Performance Award for Emma Mackey and Audience Award.

=== Accolades ===
Award	Date of ceremony	Category	Recipient(s)	Result	Ref.
British Independent Film Awards	4 December 2022	Best Lead Performance	Emma Mackey	Nominated	
British Independent Film Awards	4 December 2022	Best Supporting Performance	Fionn Whitehead	Nominated	
British Independent Film Awards	4 December 2022	Douglas Hickox Award (Best Debut Director)	Frances O'Connor	Nominated	
British Independent Film Awards	4 December 2022	Best Ensemble Performance	Amelia Gething, Emma Mackey, Oliver Jackson-Cohen, Fionn Whitehead, Alexandra Dowling, Gemma Jones, Adrian Dunbar	Nominated	

== See also ==
- The Brontë Sisters (1979)
