= Bagman (2024 film) =

2024 American film by Colm McCarthy

- Promotional poster
- Directed by: Colm McCarthy
- Written by: John Hulme
- Produced by: Marty Bowen; John Fischer; Wyck Godfrey; Isaac Klausner
- Starring: Sam Claflin; Antonia Thomas; William Hope; Steven Cree; Frankie Corio
- Cinematography: Nick Remy Matthews
- Edited by: Jeff Betancourt
- Music by: Tim Williams
- Production company: Temple Hill Entertainment
- Distributed by: Lionsgate Films
- Release date: September 27, 2024
- Running time: 92 minutes
- Country: United States
- Language: English
- Budget: $12–15 million
- Box office: $1.8 million

Bagman is a 2024 American supernatural horror film directed by Colm McCarthy and written by John Hulme. It stars Sam Claflin, Antonia Thomas, William Hope, Steven Cree, and Frankie Corio.

The film was released on September 27, 2024, by Lionsgate Films.

== Plot ==
Patrick McKee, struggling with his finances, moves back to his childhood home with his wife Karina and their young son Jake. His brother Liam runs the lumber business there, but Patrick is haunted by strange sounds at night, flickering lights and weird sightings — he becomes convinced that a sinister force is invading their home. When Jake starts talking about an invisible friend named Dolly, Patrick's fears deepen, especially because he carries trauma from his past: as a boy, he narrowly escaped a creature known in local folklore as the “Bagman,” who snatches well-behaved children and stuffs them into a rotting bag.

Patrick's childhood memories resurface when he recalls his father telling him about the Bagman's lair in an old, abandoned copper mine nearby. A psychologist explains that, according to legend, the Bagman feeds on vulnerability and fear, targeting the “good” children. Patrick also remembers a special carving knife his father gave him — a talisman, he was told, that could ward off the evil. But he had broken it in a moment of frustration long ago.

As the hauntings intensify, Karina's sister Anna is attacked by the Bagman while babysitting Jake, sparking more terror. One night, Patrick witnesses a horrifying vision: Bagman crawling through their house, heading toward Jake's cot, holding his decaying duffel bag. He chases the creature into the mine shaft, where he finds a porcelain doll inside the unzipped bag — but instead of Jake's cries, the doll emits Jake's recorded voice as a trap.

The Bagman reveals that its true target was always Patrick, not Jake. In a final confrontation, Patrick fights back using his broken knife. Though he wounds the creature, he is overpowered. In a self-sacrificing act, he lets himself be captured, stuffing himself into the duffel bag. Karina realizes what's happened when she later finds Jake's bloodstained flute — she understands Patrick gave himself up to protect their son, and she leaves their home to keep Jake safe, carrying the flute as his only protection.

== Cast ==
- Sam Claflin as Patrick McKee
- Antonia Thomas as Karina McKee
- William Hope as Chief Isaacs
- Steven Cree as Liam McKee
  - Jordan Gubian as Young Liam
- Frankie Corio as Emily
- Adelle Leonce as Anna
- Henry Pettigrew as Don
- Sharon D. Clarke as Barbara
- Neil Linpow as Officer Rawls
- Caréll Vincent Rhoden as Jake McKee
- Will Davis as Bagman

== Production ==
On October 11, 2019, Paramount Players announced Bagman, with Colm McCarthy set to direct the film. On May 13, 2022, Sam Claflin was announced to star in the film, with the project moving to Lionsgate.

Media Capital Technologies co-financed the film.

== Release ==
Bagman was released in a limited theatrical release on September 27, 2024.

== Reception ==
Peter Sobczynski of RogerEbert.com gave the film one star of four, stating "The only chance of experiencing any actual chills is if you doze off and generate a more interesting nightmare of your own". Jayanty Nada Shofa of Jakarta Globe found the film to be an uneven horror film with a weak buildup, but notes that it gains interest in the latter half, ultimately deeming it not memorable despite having some engaging moments.

Enid Román Almansa of Cinemanía gave the film three stars out of five considered the film entertaining and acknowledges Sam Claflin's strong performance as a father protecting his adorable son, but notes that it suffers from predictable moments and common horror clichés. Whang Yee Ling of The Straits Times gave the film two stars out of five described the film as "forgettable" with a thin and often nonsensical plot, despite its touches of fatherly love and the intriguing premise of confronting childhood trauma.
