= The Great Beyond (film) =

Upcoming American fantasy film

- Directed by: J. J. Abrams
- Written by: J. J. Abrams
- Produced by: J. J. Abrams; Tommy Gormley
- Starring: Glen Powell; Jenna Ortega; Emma Mackey; Sophie Okonedo; Merritt Wever; Samuel L. Jackson
- Cinematography: James Friend
- Music by: J. J. Abrams
- Production company: Bad Robot
- Distributed by: Warner Bros. Pictures
- Release date: October 1, 2027
- Country: United States
- Language: English

The Great Beyond is an upcoming American science fantasy film written, co-produced, and directed by J. J. Abrams. The film stars Glen Powell, Jenna Ortega, Emma Mackey, Sophie Okonedo, Merritt Wever, and Samuel L. Jackson.

The Great Beyond is scheduled to be released by Warner Bros. Pictures in the United States on October 1, 2027.

== Cast ==
- Glen Powell
- Jenna Ortega
- Emma Mackey
- Samuel L. Jackson
- Sophie Okonedo
- Merritt Wever

== Production ==
In May 2024, it was reported that J. J. Abrams had been working on his next feature film, in which Glen Powell had entered talks to join as the lead. In August, Jenna Ortega joined the cast in an undisclosed role, with Powell confirmed to star as well. In November, Emma Mackey joined and Samuel L. Jackson entered talks. In April 2025, Jackson was confirmed to star in the film. James Friend serves as the cinematographer. On April 4, 2025, it was reported that the film was in pre-production at Warner Bros. Studios Leavesden in Hertfordshire, England.

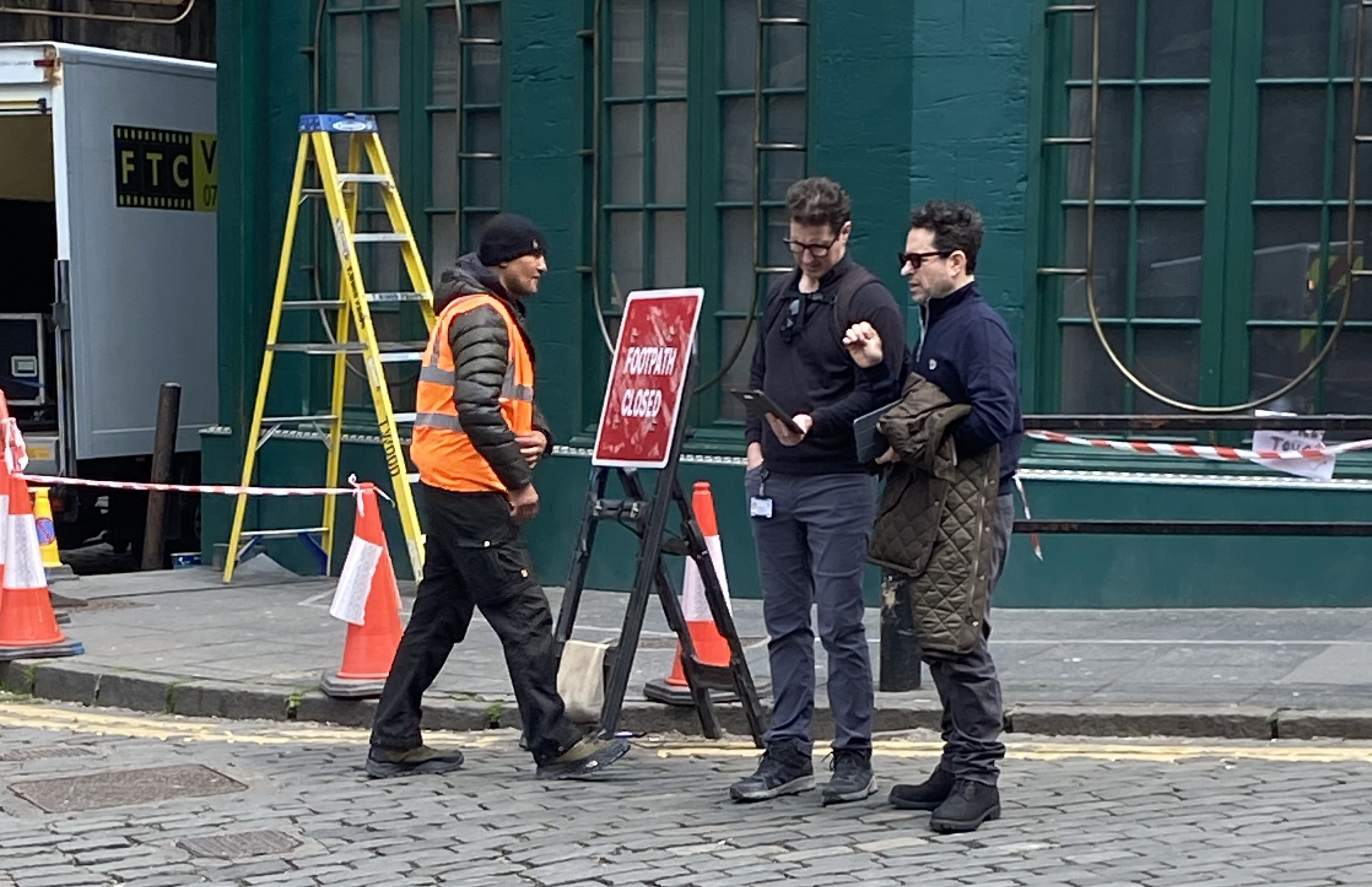
J. J. Abrams (right) filming in Edinburgh during June 2025

Filming took place in Edinburgh and Glasgow in June 2025. In August 2025, additional filming occurred in Cranston and Providence, Rhode Island, where the movie was referred to under the working title of Ghostwriter. Filming wrapped on August 25, 2025. In January 2026, it was reported that the film's official title is The Great Beyond, with Sophie Okonedo and Merritt Wever joining the cast. In July 2026, it was announced that Abrams would also compose the score for the film.

== Release ==
The Great Beyond is scheduled to be released in the United States by Warner Bros. Pictures on October 1, 2027, taking the original release date of The Batman: Part II (2028), giving that film more time for its post-production process. It was previously scheduled to release on November 13, 2026.
