= California Schemin' =

2025 film by James McAvoy

- Theatrical release poster
- Directed by: James McAvoy
- Written by: Elaine Gracie; Archie Thomson
- Based on: California Schemin': How Two Lads from Scotland Conned the Music Industry by Gavin Bain
- Produced by: Danny Page; Paul Aniello; Simon Kay; Michael Mendelsohn
- Starring: Séamus McLean Ross; Samuel Bottomley; Lucy Halliday; Rebekah Murrell; James McAvoy
- Cinematography: James Rhodes
- Edited by: Joe Sawyer
- Music by: Raffertie
- Production companies: Patriot Pictures; Homefront Productions
- Distributed by: StudioCanal (United Kingdom); Magenta Light Studios (United States)
- Release dates: 6 September 2025 (TIFF); 10 April 2026 (United Kingdom); 9 October 2026 (United States)
- Running time: 107 minutes
- Countries: United Kingdom; United States
- Language: English
- Box office: $730,764

California Schemin' (stylized as California $chemin') is a 2025 biographical musical film directed by James McAvoy in his directorial debut. The film stars Samuel Bottomley and Séamus McLean Ross as Scottish faux-American rap pairing Silibil N' Brains, Gavin Bain and Billy Boyd, and is based on Bain's 2010 memoir California Schemin': How Two Lads from Scotland Conned the Music Industry.

California Schemin' premiered at the Toronto International Film Festival on 6 September 2025. It was released theatrically in the United Kingdom by StudioCanal on 10 April 2026, and was released by Magenta Light Studios in the United States on 9 October 2026. The film received positive reviews from critics.

== Plot ==
The film tells the true story of Silibil N' Brains, a rap duo from Dundee who, for three years, pretended to be American in order to be taken seriously by the record industry.

== Cast ==
- Samuel Bottomley as Billy "Silibil" Boyd
- Séamus McLean Ross as Gavin "Brains" Bain
- James McAvoy as Anthony Reid
- Lucy Halliday as Mary Boyd
- Rebekah Murrell as Tessa
- James Corden as a music executive
- Jennifer Winn as Hayley

== Production ==
James McAvoy was reported to be directing a film about faux-Californian rap duo, Silibil N' Brains, otherwise known as Gavin Bain and Billy Boyd from Dundee in Scotland, in October 2023.

The film is produced by Danny Page of Homefront Productions and Michael Mendelsohn of Patriot Pictures. It is based on Bain's 2010 memoir California Schemin': How Two Lads from Scotland Conned the Music Industry (which was later re-printed as Straight Outta Scotland) and adapted by Elaine Gracie and Archie Thomson. Samuel Bottomley and Séamus McLean Ross were cast to play Boyd and Bain. McAvoy also has a small role in the film. It was funded by Screen Scotland.

Principal photography began on 29 October 2024. Filming locations include Dundee and Glasgow.

== Release ==
Bankside Films handled international pre-sales on the film in September 2024; among the buyers was StudioCanal, which bought the film for the U.K. and Ireland. California Schemin premiered at the Toronto International Film Festival on 6 September 2025.

The film was screened at the 20th Rome Film Festival in October 2025. It also received a special screening at the Gasparilla International Film Festival on March 5, 2026, and was also screened at the Glasgow Film Festival on March 8, 2026.

In the United Kingdom, it was released theatrically on 10 April 2026. In March 2026, Magenta Light Studios acquired the U.S. distribution rights. It was released in the United States on 9 October 2026.

== Reception ==
On the review aggregator website Rotten Tomatoes, 92% of 71 critics' reviews are positive. The website's consensus reads: "California Schemin' transcends its predictability with its tonal evolution from playful comedy to poignant drama and central performances that make its underdog journey hard to resist." Metacritic assigned the film a score of 65 out of 100, based on 18 critics, indicating "generally favorable" reviews. Séamus McLean Ross and Samuel Bottomley were nominated for Best Joint Lead Performance at the 2026 British Independent Film Awards.

== See also ==
- The Great Hip Hop Hoax, a 2013 documentary which also told the story of the group
