= Utopia (2015 film) =

2015 film

- Film poster
- Directed by: Hassan Nazer
- Written by: Amir Aghaei
- Produced by: Chris Robb
- Starring: Malalai Zikria; Hannah Spearritt; Homayoun Ershadi; Bhasker Patel
- Cinematography: Hákon Pálsson; Ahmad Kavoosi; Yiannis Manolopoulos
- Edited by: Reza Jouze
- Music by: Arman Moosa Pour
- Production companies: Tripswitch Productions; World Film Production; Nay Media Production
- Release date: 26 July 2015
- Running time: 87 minutes
- Countries: Afghanistan; Scotland; India
- Languages: Dari; English; Hindi; Persian

Utopia is a 2015 Afghan drama film directed by Hassan Nazer and produced by Chris Robb. The film was selected as the Afghan entry for the Best Foreign Language Film at the 88th Academy Awards but it was not nominated. However, it was disqualified a few days prior to its Academy screening for having too much dialogue in English. The Afghan filmmakers union tried to appeal, citing the language breakdown by minutes, but the appeal was unsuccessful.

== Cast ==
- Malalai Zikria as Janan
- Hannah Spearritt as Lucy
- Homayoun Ershadi as Najib
- Bhasker Patel as Spiritual Man
- Andrew Shaver as William
- Saahil Chadha as Rajnesh
- Arun Bali as Rajendra
- Alec Westwood as UK Doctor
- Chris Robb as William's friend

== See also ==
- List of submissions to the 88th Academy Awards for Best Foreign Language Film
- List of Afghan submissions for the Academy Award for Best Foreign Language Film
