= British Independent Film Award for Breakthrough Producer =

British film award

- Awarded for: Best Breakthrough Producer
- Country: United Kingdom
- Presented by: BIFA
- First award: 2016
- Currently held by: Balthazar De Ganay and James Bowsher for Santosh (2024)
- Website: www.bifa.org.uk

The British Independent Film Award for Breakthrough Producer is an annual award given by the British Independent Film Awards (BIFA) to recognize the best British breakthrough producer.

The award was first presented in the 2016 ceremony. Camille Gatin was the first recipient of the award for he sci-fi horror film The Girl with All the Gifts.

According to BIFA, the category is for a "British producer for their first or second documentary or fiction feature film".

== Winners and nominees ==
=== 2010s ===
Year	Recipient(s)	Film
2016 (19th)	Camille Gatin	The Girl with All the Gifts
2016 (19th)	Michael Berliner	Adult Life Skills
2016 (19th)	Mike Brett, Jo Jo Ellison and Steve Jamison	Notes on Blindness
2016 (19th)	Paul Fegan	Where You're Meant to Be
2016 (19th)	Dionne Walker	The Hard Stop
2017 (20th)	Emily Morgan	I Am Not a Witch
2017 (20th)	Fodhla Cronin O'Reilly	Lady Macbeth
2017 (20th)	Gavin Humphries	Pin Cushion
2017 (20th)	Brendan Mullin and Katy Jackson	Bad Day for the Cut
2017 (20th)	Jack Tarling and Manon Ardisson	God's Own Country
2018 (21st)	Jacqui Davies	Ray & Liz
2018 (21st)	Kristian Brodie	Beast
2018 (21st)	Anna Griffin	Calibre
2018 (21st)	Marcie MacLellan	Apostasy
2018 (21st)	Faye Ward	Stan & Ollie
2019 (22nd)	Kate Byers and Linn Waite	Bait
2019 (22nd)	Finn Bruce	Tucked
2019 (22nd)	Joy Gharoro-Akpojotor	Blue Story
2019 (22nd)	Becky Read	Three Identical Strangers
2019 (22nd)	Jack Sidey and Eric Abraham	Moffie

=== 2020s ===
Year	Recipient(s)	Film
2020 (23rd)	Irune Gurtubai	Limbo
2020 (23rd)	Douglas Cox	Host
2020 (23rd)	Daniel Emmerson	Calm with Horses
2020 (23rd)	Oliver Kassman	Saint Maud
2020 (23rd)	Edward King and Martin Gentles	His House
2021 (24th)	Michele Antoniades	Sweetheart
2021 (24th)	Helen Jones	Censor
2021 (24th)	Jessica Malik	She Will
2021 (24th)	Hester Ruoff	Boiling Point
2021 (24th)	Rob Watson	The Power
2022 (25th)	Nadira Murray	Winners
2022 (25th)	Aleksandra Bilić and Jennifer Corcoran	Nascondino
2022 (25th)	Paul Kennedy	Nightride
2022 (25th)	Rupert Majendie	Brian and Charles
2022 (25th)	Hélène Sifre	Blue Jean
2023 (26th)	Theo Barrowclough	Scrapper
2023 (26th)	Georgia Goggin	Pretty Red Dress
2023 (26th)	Yvonne Isimeme Ibazebo	Rye Lane
2023 (26th)	Gannesh Rajah	If the Streets Were on Fire
2023 (26th)	Chi Thai	Raging Grace
2024 (27th)	Balthazar De Ganay and James Bowsher	Santosh (Note: Also produced by Mike Goodridge and Alan McAlex.)
2024 (27th)	Hollie Bryan and Lucy Meer	The Ceremony
2024 (27th)	Jacob Swan Hyam	Bring Them Down (Note: Also produced by Julianne Ford, Ivana Mackinnon, Jean-Yves Roubin, Ruth Treacey and Cassandre Warnauts.)
2024 (27th)	Ben Toye	Treading Water
2024 (27th)	Rebecca Wolff	Grand Theft Hamlet (Note: Also produced by Julia Ton.)

== See also ==
- BAFTA Award for Outstanding Debut by a British Writer, Director or Producer
