= Winners (2022 film) =

- Theatrical release poster
- Directed by: Hassan Nazer
- Written by: Hassan Nazer- Hamed Emami
- Produced by: Mohsen Mosaferchi; Nadira Murray; Paul Welsh
- Starring: Parsa Maghami; Helia Mohammadkhani; Hossein Abedini
- Cinematography: Arash Seifi; Arash Seyfijamadi
- Edited by: Hamid Bashe Ahangar; David Arthur; Reza Jouze; Hassan Nazer
- Music by: Mohsen Amini; Mohammad Saeed Shayan
- Production companies: Edge City Films; Screen Scotland; Sylph Productions; World Film Production
- Release date: August 2022 (EIFF)
- Running time: 85 minutes
- Country: United Kingdom
- Language: Persian

Winners (Persian: برنده‌ها Barandehâ) is a 2022 British Persian-language drama film written and directed by Hassan Nazer. The plot follows two children from a small Iranian community who discover the lost Academy Award statuette of Asghar Farhadi. It was selected as the British entry for the Best International Feature Film at the 95th Academy Awards, but was not nominated.

== Synopsis ==
In a small provincial Iranian town, the children work hard to support their families. One day nine-year-old Yahya and his friend Leyla find a precious statue. Sharing a passion for cinema, Yahya's boss Naser Khan (Reza Naji) decides to help them find the owner.

== Cast ==
The actors participating in this film are:

- Parsa Maghami as Yahya
- Helia Mohammadkhani as Leyla
- Hossein Abedini as Saber
- Mahmoud Jafari as Driver
- Shahrzad Kamalzadeh as Mrs. Sadeghi
- Reza Naji as Naser Khan
- Ezzatollah Ramazanifar as Uncle Ezzat
- Asghar Semsarzade as Antique Dealer
- Martine Malalai Zikria as Mother

== Production ==
=== Script ===
Hassan Nazer had the conceptual idea for the film from a very young age, but it wasn't until Trump's travel ban prevented eventual winner Asghar Farhadi from picking up his Academy Award for Best Foreign Language Film for The Salesman in February of 2017.

=== Filming ===
Winners was financed, developed and post-produced in Scotland and shot on Iranian territory.

== Release ==
The film had its world premiere at the Edinburgh International Film Festival in August 2022, where it won the Audience Award.

== Reception ==
=== Critical reception ===
Deadline's Anna Smith wrote: "Winners, is an ode to cinema and the joys it brings, and it also pays tribute to the great achievements of Iranian filmmakers, dedicating the work to Abbas Kiarostami, Asghar Farhadi, Majid Maijdi and Jafar Panahi. But it also highlights the contrast between film festival plaudits and real life: what the cast and crew are left with once the party’s over." Screendaily's Fionnula Halligan wrote: "Ostensibly a film in the vein of Cinema Paradiso — which it references on several occasions — this is a curio for cineastes and festivalgoers, especially given the presence of Reza Naji in a lead role... Visually, Winners also harks back to the distinctive work of the Iranian New Wave; to Kiarostami and Makhmalbaf and everyone who came before. One thing is for sure: Nazer, and everyone in his film, loves Iranian cinema."

=== Accolades ===
| Year | Award | Category | Recipient | Result | Ref. |
|---|---|---|---|---|---|
| 2022 | British Independent Film Awards 2022 | Breakthrough Producer | Nadira Murray | Won | |
| 2022 | British Independent Film Awards 2022 | The Raindance Discovery Award | Hassan Nazer, Nadira Murray, Paul Welsh | Won | |
| 2022 | Edinburgh International Film Festival | Audience Award | Winners | Won | |
| 2022 | Raindance Film Festival | Best UK Feature | Winners | Won | |
