= Amelia Gething =

English actress, comedy writer and creator

- Born: 24 January 1999 (age 27); Redbridge, Greater London, England
- Occupation: Actress
- Years active: 2016–present

Amelia Gething (born 24 January 1999) is an English actress and writer. She began her career as a content-creator and wrote the BBC show The Amelia Gething Complex (2019–2021). She has since appeared in the film Emily (2022) and the Starz historical drama The Spanish Princess (2020).

== Early life ==
Gething was born in the East London Borough of Redbridge and grew up in Barking. She participated in school productions from a young age. She planned to study psychology at university, but made the decision to leave her sixth-form college early before completing her A Levels when her career began to take off.

== Career ==
Gething first began performing as a comedy artist and content-creator on social media in 2016, writing and performing sketches to over 7 million followers across YouTube and Musical.ly (later TikTok). She was approached by the BBC in mid-2018 and invited to create a female-led comedy sketch show, which eventually became The Amelia Gething Complex.

The first season of The Amelia Gething Complex was released in October 2019, with a second season commissioned by the BBC released in March 2021. In total, there have been 18 episodes over the course of two seasons.

In 2020, Gething played Ursula Pole in the second installment of the Starz historical drama The Spanish Princess. It was announced in 2021 that Gething had been cast as Anne Brontë in Frances O'Connor's biographical film Emily alongside Emma Mackey, Oliver Jackson-Cohen and Fionn Whitehead, directed by Frances O'Connor. The cast were jointly nominated for Best Ensemble Performance at the 2022 British Independent Film Awards.

In 2023, it was revealed Gething had voiced the female player character in the video game Hogwarts Legacy. She has roles in the Sky Atlantic historical drama Mary & George, the Apple TV+ war drama Masters of the Air, the Belgian series The Phoebus Files, and the vampire film Blood & Ink with Malcolm McDowell and Derek Jacobi.

== Filmography ==
Year	Title	Role	Notes
2018	Hollyoaks	Herself	1 episode
2019–2021	The Amelia Gething Complex	Writer / Herself	18 episodes
2020	The Spanish Princess	Ursula Pole	7 episodes
2022	Emily	Anne Brontë	
2023	Hogwarts Legacy	Female Protagonist (voice)	Video game
2024	Masters of the Air	Isabel	Upcoming
2024	Mary & George	Frances Coke, Viscountess Purbeck	Upcoming
TBA	The Phoebus Files	Louise Weckx	Upcoming
TBA	Blood & Ink		Upcoming
