= Blue Jean (film) =

2022 film by Georgia Oakley

- Release poster
- Directed by: Georgia Oakley
- Written by: Georgia Oakley
- Produced by: Hélène Sifre
- Starring: Rosy McEwen; Kerrie Hayes; Lucy Halliday
- Cinematography: Victor Seguin
- Edited by: Izabella Curry
- Music by: Chris Roe, Stavros Papanikolaou
- Production companies: BBC Film; BFI; Kleio Films; Great Point Media
- Distributed by: Altitude Films
- Release dates: 3 September 2022 (Venice); 10 February 2023
- Running time: 97 minutes
- Country: United Kingdom
- Language: English
- Box office: $693,331

Blue Jean is a 2022 British drama film written and directed by Georgia Oakley, in her directorial debut. It stars Rosy McEwen, Kerrie Hayes and Lucy Halliday.

The film premiered on 3 September 2022 at the 79th Venice Film Festival and was released in cinemas on 10 February 2023.

== Plot ==
In Newcastle in 1988, Jean is a physical education teacher at a secondary school. On her way to work, she hears a news broadcast about the proposed Section 28 legislation, but switches it off. At school, she is reserved and closeted, and lies to her coworkers to avoid socialising with them after work. She regularly visits a lesbian bar with her friends and girlfriend Viv.

While Viv is at Jean's flat, Jean tries to watch Blind Date, while Viv refuses, declaring it to be anti-gay propaganda. Jean's sister arrives unannounced and asks her to look after her son, Sam. Jean hides Viv's presence from her sister and downplays their relationship to Sam, which angers Viv.

A new student, Lois, arrives at school. Later, Jean and Lois recognise each other in the lesbian bar, but do not exchange words or acknowledge the meeting later. Lois gains a sudden interest in netball and joins Jean's netball team, where she clashes with another student, Siobhan. Lois also spends more time at the bar, and befriends Jean's friendship group. Jean confronts her and tells her to stay away, warning her she could lose her job at the school if she is outed. Viv sees Jean and Lois exiting the toilets, and leaves in anger, firstly believing Jean is cheating on her. Jean confesses to Viv about how she knows Lois, and Viv responds by telling Jean she is setting a poor example for her students.

Jean visits her sister for Sunday lunch, where she sees a photograph of her from her wedding day. She asks her sister to take the photograph down, and her sister reveals that she knows Jean is a lesbian.

Jean's boss Paula finds a copy of a lesbian magazine on Jean's desk, left there by somebody else, and Jean assumes Lois is responsible. Siobhan provokes Lois after a game of netball, and the two students fight. After Jean breaks the fight up, Siobhan kisses Lois in the shower, which Jean sees, but Siobhan claims Lois assaulted her. Despite knowing this to be a lie, Jean goes along with it, and Lois is suspended.

Jean tries to apologise to Viv, but Viv says they cannot get back together. She also tries to make amends to Lois, but she is uninterested in talking to Jean. At a children's birthday party, Jean comes out to her brother-in-law and a friend, before bursting out in laughter as she leaves.

She convinces Lois to come with her to a house party, where Jean's friends share in the "bog fund", a co-operative fund for lesbians in the city. A friend of Jean's tells Lois the lesbians with "real jobs" like Jean contribute to the fund. Later that night, Viv and Jean talk in friendly terms, but don't reconcile.

The next day, Jean arrives at school with a smile on her face.

== Cast ==
- Rosy McEwen as Jean
- Kerrie Hayes as Viv
- Lucy Halliday as Lois
- Lydia Page as Siobhan
- Stacy Abalogun as Ace
- Amy Booth-Steele as Debbie
- Aoife Kennan as Sasha
- Scott Turnbull as Tim
- Farrah Cave as Michelle
- Kylie Ann Ford as Lisa
- Lainey Shaw as Paula
- Izzy Neish as Abi
- Becky Lindsay as Jill

== Release ==
Blue Jean premiered on 3 September 2022 in the Venice Days section of the 79th edition of the Venice Film Festival. It was released in cinemas in the United Kingdom on 10 February 2023 by Altitude Films.

=== Critical reception ===
The film received positive reviews from film critics. Review aggregator Rotten Tomatoes reports 96% of 113 critics have given the film a positive review, with an average rating of 7.9/10. The website's critical consensus reads, "Bridging times past with issues that are still current, Blue Jean resonates intellectually and emotionally thanks to thoughtful direction and authentic performances". Metacritic gives the film a weighted average rating of 87 out of 100, based on 18 reviews, indicating "universal acclaim".

=== Accolades ===
Award	Date of ceremony	Category	Recipient(s)	Result	Ref.
Venice Film Festival	11 September 2022	People Choice's Award	Blue Jean	Won	
British Independent Film Awards	4 December 2022	Best British Independent Film	Blue Jean	Nominated	
British Independent Film Awards	4 December 2022	Best Director	Georgia Oakley	Nominated	
British Independent Film Awards	4 December 2022	Best Lead Performance	Rosy McEwen	Won	
British Independent Film Awards	4 December 2022	Best Supporting Performance	Kerrie Hayes	Won	
British Independent Film Awards	4 December 2022	Best Supporting Performance	Lucy Halliday	Nominated	
British Independent Film Awards	4 December 2022	Breakthrough Performance	Rosy McEwen	Nominated	
British Independent Film Awards	4 December 2022	Best Screenplay	Georgia Oakley	Nominated	
British Independent Film Awards	4 December 2022	Best Casting	Shaheen Baig	Won	
British Independent Film Awards	4 December 2022	Best Editing	Izabella Curry	Nominated	
British Independent Film Awards	4 December 2022	Best Debut Director	Georgia Oakley	Nominated	
British Independent Film Awards	4 December 2022	Best Debut Screenwriter	Georgia Oakley	Won	
British Independent Film Awards	4 December 2022	Breakthrough Producer	Hélène Sifre	Nominated	
British Independent Film Awards	4 December 2022	Best Ensemble Performance	Rosy McEwen, Kerrie Hayes, Lucy Halliday, Lydia Page, Stacy Abalogun, Farrah Cave, Amy Booth-Steel	Nominated	
British Academy Film Awards	19 February 2023	Outstanding Debut by a British Writer, Director or Producer	Georgia Oakley (director), Hélène Sifre (producer)	Nominated	
Gotham Independent Film Awards	27 November 2023	Breakthrough Director	Georgia Oakley	Nominated	
GLAAD Media Awards	14 March 2024	Outstanding Film – Limited Theatrical Release	Blue Jean	Nominated	
Chlotrudis Awards	17 March 2024	Best Breakout Performance	Rosy McEwen	Won	
