= Samuel Bottomley =

English actor (born 2001)

- Born: 14 June 2001 (age 25); Wibsey, Bradford, England
- Occupation: Actor
- Years active: 2011–present

Samuel Bottomley (born 14 June 2001) is an English actor. He began his career as a child actor, making his acting debut in the drama film Tyrannosaur (2011). After starring as Brandon Kelleher on the CBBC children's series Rocket's Island (2014–2015), he portrayed Jordan Wilson on the Channel 4 school drama Ackley Bridge (2017–2018). He then appeared in Kiss Me First (2018), Ladhood (2019–2022), the film adaptation of Everybody's Talking About Jamie (2021) and Somewhere Boy (2022).

Bottomley has since appeared in projects including How to Have Sex (2023), The Last Rifleman (2023), Coldwater (2025) and Anemone (2025). He also starred as Billy "Silibil" Boyd in the biographical musical film California Schemin' (2025).

== Early life ==
Bottomley was born on 14 June 2001 in Wibsey, Bradford. He attended Lightcliffe Academy. Bottomley was a member of the Buttershaw St Paul's Amateur Operatic Dramatic Society.

== Career ==
At the age of nine, Bottomley made his professional acting debut in the 2011 drama film Tyrannosaur. He then appeared in the 2012 film Private Peaceful as the younger version of Tommo.

In 2014, Bottomley began portraying Brandon in the CBBC series Rocket's Island, a role he portrayed until 2015. From 2017 to 2018, Bottomley portrayed Jordan Wilson in the Channel 4 school drama Ackley Bridge. In 2019, he starred in the comedy film Get Duked! as Ian. In the same year, he began starring in the iPlayer series Ladhood as Ralph Roberts. In 2021, he starred in the film Everybody's Talking About Jamie, in the role of Dean Paxton. Also in 2021, Bottomley was cast in the Channel 5 drama The Teacher, which aired in early 2022. This was followed by his casting in the Channel 4 comedy-drama series Somewhere Boy, as well as a recurring role in the BBC series Am I Being Unreasonable?.

In 2023, Bottomley appeared in the coming-of-age film How to Have Sex, as well as The Last Rifleman, a war drama film. 2025 saw him star in the ITV1 thriller series Coldwater. Also in 2025, Bottomley starred as Billy "Silibil" Boyd in the 2025 musical film California Schemin', as well as a role in the psychological drama film Anemone.

== Filmography ==
=== Film ===
Year	Title	Role	Notes
2011	Tyrannosaur	Samuel	
2012	Private Peaceful	Young Tommo	
2017	Ghost Stories	Young Goodman	
2019	The Last Right	Louis Murphy	
2019	Get Duked!	Ian	
2020	Running Naked	Young Mark	
2021	Everybody's Talking About Jamie	Dean Paxton	
2021	Sundown	Colin Bennett	
2023	How to Have Sex	Paddy	
2023	The Last Rifleman	Rory	
2024	Early Twenties	Jack	Short film
2025	California Schemin'	Billy Boyd	
2025	Anemone	Brian	
2026	The State of Us	Frankie	

=== Television ===
Year	Title	Role	Notes
2014–2015	Rocket's Island	Brandon Kelleher	Main role
2015	Sons of Liberty	Christopher Seider	Episode: "A Dangerous Game"
2015	Wolf Hall	Young Thomas Cromwell	Recurring role
2016	Moving On	Connor	Episode: "Passengers"
2016	Jericho	George Quaintain	Main role
2017–2018	Ackley Bridge	Jordan Wilson	Main role
2018	Kiss Me First	Ben / Denier	Main role
2019–2022	Ladhood	Ralph Roberts	Main role
2022	The Teacher	Kyle	Main role
2022	Somewhere Boy	Aaron	Main role
2022	Am I Being Unreasonable?	Boy	Recurring role
2025	Coldwater	Cameron	Main role
2026	Break Clause	Ben	Main role
