= Frankie Boyle's Farewell to the Monarchy =

2023 Channel 4 documentary

- Genre: Documentary
- Starring: Frankie Boyle
- Country of origin: United Kingdom
- Original language: English

Production
- Running time: 47 minutes

Original release
- Network: Channel 4
- Release: 30 April 2023

Frankie Boyle's Farewell to the Monarchy is a 2023 television documentary that aired on Channel 4 about British kings and queens. Scheduled around Charles III's coronation, Boyle explores the reigns of William the Conqueror, Richard III, Henry VIII, Lady Jane Grey, Elizabeth I and Queen Victoria.

== Synopsis ==
In light of Charles III's coronation in 2023, Frankie Boyle explores the history of the British monarchy. He makes jokes linking historical royals with the modern-day institution, focusing on accusations of sexual violence by Prince Andrew and Prince Harry's reduced role as a royal.

Boyle speaks to an expert on combat about William the Conqueror and the Battle of Hastings. He draws connections between William's views on land ownership and the Crown Estate, including Regent Street and much land in Scotland, which makes the royals "the world's largest landowners". Moving onto Richard III, the documentary details portrayals of the king in Shakespeare's play and his 2010s exhumation. Boyle visits Hever Castle, an occupancy of Anne Boleyn, to talk about Henry VIII, and consults with experts on Lady Jane Grey's execution as a teenager, within a fortnight of becoming queen.

He sees Elizabeth I as establishing the symbolic role of the monarchy and consults with Emma Dabiri on the monarchy's role in slavery and colonialism. Boyle believes that institutional misogyny of the monarchy can be seen in Queen Victoria's reign.

== Production ==
A 75-minute documentary titled Frankie Boyle: Monarchy was announced in August 2022, as part of Channel 4's Truth or Dare series to commemorate its 40th anniversary. Set to be Boyle's first Channel 4 programme in 10 years, it was shelved following the death of Elizabeth II in September 2022.

The 60-minute Farewell to the Monarchy premiered on 30 April 2023, in a Sunday 10 p.m. timeslot, shortly before Charles III's coronation. It aired on Channel 4 alongside other specials critical of the monarchy, including the two-part Andrew – The Problem Prince, an episode of The Windsors and a repeat broadcast of Prince Andrew: The Musical.

The British regulator Ofcom dismissed over 100 complaints about the programme, most focused on a line in which Boyle encouraged viewers to "raise a bottle" to the royal family that was "filled with petrol and a burning rag".

== Reception ==
The programme won the Entertainment category of the 2023 British Academy Scotland Awards (BAFTA Scotland).

Stuart Jeffries of The Guardian gave the show five out of five stars, lauding it for speaking "comedy truth to power" and having an "excellent take on the monarchy". Jeffries suggested the programme could continue as a series and Boyle could explore the Scottish monarchy. Chortle's Steve Bennett rated it four stars, finding its critical perspective "welcome" in contrast to other media coverage of the coronation. Bennett critiqued its format as an "odd hybrid" of stand-up comedy, republican polemic and historical documentary. The Herald's Alison Rowat described the humour as predictable, though sometimes breathtaking, and the documentary as "pacey" and "enlightening". Writing for Radio Times, Jack Seale commented that the documentary had many factual insights and showed Boyle's "uncompromising" anti-royalist perspective.
