= Frankie Corio =

Scottish actress

- Born: 7 July 2010 (age 15); Livingston, West Lothian, Scotland
- Occupation: Actress
- Years active: 2022–present
- Known for: Aftersun

Francesca Corio (born 7 July 2010) is a Scottish child actress. She is known for her debut role in the film Aftersun (2022), for which she received a number of accolades, including Critics Choice and British Independent Film Award nominations.

== Early life ==
Corio was born in Livingston, West Lothian. She is of Italian descent and has two siblings.

== Career ==
Corio was 10 when she was cast in Aftersun among 800 applicants from schools and youth clubs across Scotland, after her mother sent a photograph of her to a casting agent, and 12 by the film's release. The film, starring Paul Mescal as her character Sophie's father, marked director Charlotte Wells' feature debut, and principal photography took place in Ölüdeniz, Turkey. Corio had never acted before and claimed that she "had not been trying to get into acting". She has also starred in The Bagman as Emily.

== Filmography ==
Film
Year	Title	Director	Role	Notes
2022	Aftersun	Charlotte Wells	Sophie Patterson	
2024	Bagman	Colm McCarthy	Emily	
2025	Stray	Morven Christie	Eilidh	Short film

== Awards and nominations ==
Year	Award	Category	Work	Result	Ref
2022	Chicago Film Critics Association	Most Promising Performer	Aftersun	Nominated	
2022	Florida Film Critics Circle	Pauline Kael Breakout Award	Aftersun	Runner-up	
2022	Gotham Independent Film Awards	Breakthrough Performer	Aftersun	Nominated	
2022	Greater Western New York Film Critics Association	Breakthrough Performance	Aftersun	Nominated	
2022	Indiana Film Journalists Association	Best Supporting Performance	Aftersun	Nominated	
2022	Indiana Film Journalists Association	Breakout of the Year (performer)	Aftersun	Nominated	
2022	Las Vegas Film Critics Society	Best Female Youth Performance	Aftersun	Won	
2022	North Texas Film Critics Association	Best Newcomer	Aftersun	Nominated	
2022	Online Association of Female Film Critics	Breakthrough Performance	Aftersun	Nominated	
2022	Phoenix Film Critics Society	Best Performance by a Youth	Aftersun	Won	
2022	UK Film Critics Association	Supporting Actress of the Year	Aftersun	Nominated	
2022	Washington D.C. Area Film Critics Association	Best Youth Performance	Aftersun	Nominated	
2023	Alliance of Women Film Journalists	Best Breakthrough Performance	Aftersun	Nominated	
2023	Austin Film Critics Association	Breakthrough Artist Award	Aftersun	Nominated	
2023	Chicago Indie Critics	Breakout Artist	Aftersun	Nominated	
2023	Critics' Choice Movie Awards	Best Young Actor/Actress	Aftersun	Nominated	
2023	DiscussingFilm Critics Awards	Best Breakthrough Performance	Aftersun	Nominated	
2023	Dorian Awards	Rising Star of the Year	Aftersun	Nominated	
2023	Film Independent Spirit Awards	Best Breakthrough Performance	Aftersun	Nominated	
2023	International Cinephile Society	Breakthrough Performance	Aftersun	Won	
2023	London Film Critics Circle	Young British/Irish Performer	Aftersun	Won	
2023	Music City Film Critics Association	Best Young Actress	Aftersun	Won	
2023	North Carolina Film Critics Association	Best Breakthrough Performance	Aftersun	Nominated	
2023	Online Film and Television Association	Best Youth Performance	Aftersun	Won	
2023	Online Film and Television Association	Best Breakout Performer (female)	Aftersun	Nominated	
2023	Seattle Film Critics Society	Best Youth Performance	Aftersun	Won	
2023	Vancouver Film Critics Circle	Best Supporting Female Actor	Aftersun	Nominated	
