= Hassan Nazer =

British-Iranian film director, film editor and producer

- Occupations: Film director, film editor and Film producer
- Years active: 2011–present

Hassan Nazer (Persian: حسن ناظر) is a British-Iranian film director, screenwriter, film editor and producer. The Aberdeen-based filmmaker first settled as a young refugee in 2002. He is also a judge in international film festivals. He was the head of jury team in SAARC Film Festival 2019 which was held in Sri Lanka.

== Career ==
Nazer moved from his hometown of Garmsar to Tehran and took theatre courses under the Iranian director Hamid Samandarian. As a new theatre director, Nazer had been "red-flagged" for putting women on stage in the holy city of Mashad which motivated him to leave his home country in order to work in cinema and theatre. Nazer arrived in Scotland in 2000, and attended the University of Aberdeen where he studied film and visual culture. He also began to build a restaurant business to support his filmmaking. Nazer stated in an interview, "Even though my father is a wealthy person, so he could have helped me, he didn't want me to go into the cinema, so I was determined to stand on my own two feet." Nazer eventually raised enough money to finance his own independent films.

His third film, Utopia (aka "ArmanShahr") about an Afghan woman as she travels to the U.K. for artificial insemination, was selected as the Afghan entry for the Best Foreign Language Film at the 88th Academy Awards and at Golden Globes. The film has won more than 18 awards in nationally and internationally film festivals.

Nazer's film Winners (2022) is his first film to be fully funded by outside backers and received financial support from Screen Scotland. Winners was the official UK entry for the 95th Academy Awards (2023) for Best International Feature.

He has remained involved in the political process in Iran and recently voted in the first round of the Presidential elections via a polling station in London.

Without Permission is a 2025 Iranian–Scottish drama film directed and written by Nazer. The film follows the story of an exiled Iranian filmmaker who, after being denied permission to make his scripted project, turns to children to capture their candid voices and perspectives on love, identity, and freedom. By filming secretly in hidden locations, the narrative evolves into a reflection on self-expression within a world of limitations. The film stars Behrouz Sebt Rasoul. The screenplay and direction were undertaken by Nazer. The Iranian–British co-production *Without Permission*, written and directed by **Hassan Nazer** (a BAFTA award-winning filmmaker), was selected for the main Competition section of the **30th Busan International Film Festival** in 2025. The film stars **Behrouz Sebt‐Rasoul**, previously known as a director, in his acting debut, and **Ali Mohammad Ghasemi** served as the cinematographer. The narrative follows a filmmaker's return to his homeland and his collaboration with children in search of a new expressive language—a poetic and introspective journey emphasizing the power of imagination and the self-expression of younger generations. The film's international distribution is handled by the French company DreamLab Films, led by **Nesrin Mirsheb**.

== Filmography ==
Year	Title	Role
2011	Black Day	Director, Producer
2013	We Are All Sinners (Ma Hameh Gonahkarim)	Director, Producer
2014	Whistle My Lad	Co-producer
2014	Here... Iran	Director
2015	Utopia (ArmenShahr)	Director
2022	Winners	Director
2023	American Soldier	Executive Producer
2025	Without Permission	Director

== Awards and nominations ==
Year	Film	Award	Category	Results
2022	Winners	British Independent Film Awards	The Rain Dance Maverick Award	Won
2022	Winners	Edinburgh International Film Festival	Audience Award	Won
2022	Winners	Edinburgh International Film Festival	Best New British Feature	Nominated
2022	Winners	Raindance Film Festival	Best UK Feature	Won
2023	Winners	BAFTA Scotland Awards	Best Feature Film	Won

== General references ==
- Edinburgh Film Festival Review: Hassan Nazer's ‘Winners'
- "Winners" wins audience award at Edinburgh Intl. Film Festival
- ‘Winners': Edinburgh Review
- 17 films to watch from the summer festivals
