= Colm McCarthy (director) =

Scottish television director

Colm McCarthy (born 16 February 1973) is a Scottish television director, who has directed several BBC drama productions.

== Filmography ==
=== Film ===
Year	Title	Director	Writer	Notes
2003	The Making of a Prodigy	Yes	Yes	Short film
2010	Outcast	Yes	Yes	
2016	The Girl with All the Gifts	Yes	No	
2024	Bagman	Yes	No	

=== Television ===
Year	Title	Director	Executive Producer	Notes
2001	No Frontiers	Yes	No	
2003-2005	Dream Team	Yes	No	3 episodes
2004	The Big Bow Wow	Yes	No	
2005	Footballers' Wives	Yes	No	4 episodes
2006	Hustle	Yes	No	2 episodes
2006-2007	Murphy's Law	Yes	No	6 episodes
2007	Single-Handed	Yes	No	3 episodes
2008	The Tudors	Yes	No	2 episodes
2008	Spooks	Yes	No	2 episodes
2009	Hunter	Yes	No	2 episodes
2010	The Deep	Yes	No	2 episodes
2011	Injustice	Yes	No	5 episodes
2012-2013	Endeavour	Yes	No	2 episodes
2013	Ripper Street	Yes	No	2 episodes
2013	Doctor Who	Yes	No	1 episode
2014	Sherlock	Yes	No	1 episode
2014	Peaky Blinders	Yes	No	6 episodes
2017	Black Mirror	Yes	No	1 episode
2018	Krypton	Yes	Yes	1 episode
2019	Curfew	Yes	Yes	3 episodes
2022	The Bastard Son & The Devil Himself	Yes	Yes	4 episodes
2026	Young Sherlock	Yes	TBA	TBA
