= John Hulme (author) =

American film director

John Hulme (born 1969) is an American author, screenwriter, and documentarian. He rose to prominence as a co-author of The Seems fantasy book series with Michael Wexler.

== Career ==
John Hulme and collaborator Michael Wexler edited an anthology of short stories, Voices of the Xiled, created the National Public Radio radio series, "Vanishing Point", and wrote the comedic non-fiction book Baked Potatoes: a Pot Smoker's Guide to Film and Video.

In 2005, as part of HBO’s America Undercover, Hulme directed Unknown Soldier: Searching For A Father, a documentary about his father who was killed in the Vietnam War and who he never met.

A native of Highland Park, New Jersey, Hulme directed the 2017 documentary film Blood, Sweat & Tears: A Basketball Exorcism, which covers the story of the 1987 championship basketball game between Hulme's Highland Park High School and their rivals at New Brunswick High School.

His first feature length horror screenplay, Bagman, was produced by Paramount Pictures, and directed by Colm McCarthy.
