= Silibil N' Brains =

Scottish hip-hop duo

- Origin: Dundee, Scotland
- Genre: Scottish hip-hop
- Years active: 1998–2005, 2013
- Label: Sony Records
- Members: Gavin Bain; Billy Boyd

Silibil N' Brains were a Scottish hip-hop duo consisting of Gavin Bain and Billy Boyd (not to be confused with the Scottish actor of the same name). Their experiences masquerading as two American rappers from California to secure a record deal formed the basis of Bain's 2010 memoir California Schemin' (later reprinted as Straight Outta Scotland), the 2013 documentary The Great Hip Hop Hoax, and the 2025 musical biography film California Schemin'.

== History ==
In the early 2000s, Bain and Boyd were working together in Scotland, but found that the idea of Scottish rap was not taken seriously in London. After being dismissed as "rapping Proclaimers" during auditions because of their accents, they decided to take on American identities, pretending to be from San Jacinto in California. They created the personas of Silibil (Boyd, a play on "silly Bill" and "syllable") and Brains McLoud (Bain).

Under their new identity, Silibil N' Brains were more successful at getting attention in London, eventually moving to the city to do the rounds performing live. They rapidly got management with Jonathan Shalit and later a record deal with Sony Music UK for two singles and an album. The pair worked on recording material and continued to perform live, including opening for D12 and appearing on MTV. However, Sony's merger and subsequent job losses left them without supporters in the record company and their planned first single was delayed for at least 6 months as the label focused on other acts. Boyd had got married and his wife, still in Scotland, was expecting a child. With work having dried up, he left the group, moving back to Scotland, and getting work in the oil industry. Bain continued performing as Brains on a smaller scale, and eventually told the story of the group's signing to, and then being dropped by Sony in his 2010 memoir California Schemin' (later reprinted as Straight Outta Scotland).

The duo subsequently reunited and released an EP in October 2013 called Dirty Rotten Scoundrels. They also uploaded unreleased material from their original 1998–2005 run to Bandcamp.

Bain released his solo album Almost Dead Famous on 4 July 2015, and has since continued his solo career as Brains. Boyd has carried on making music as well, but said in March 2026 that he did not want to reunite with Bain. "That's just not me any more, it wouldn't feel right. Of course I wish Gav all the best in everything, but the whole experience was tarnished because it wasn't genuine and real," he told The Courier. "I have learned from that, so it's really important to be honest and authentic with the music I make now. I'll leave the acting to the guys on screen. I've never courted this stuff. I moved on."

== In popular culture ==
The Great Hip Hop Hoax, a feature documentary about Silibil N' Brains, was made in 2013, directed by Jeanie Finlay.

A musical biographical film of the duo entitled California Schemin' began filming in Glasgow and Dundee in November 2024, directed by James McAvoy. It premiered at the 2025 Toronto International Film Festival and was released in cinemas in April 2026.

== Discography ==
- "Play with Myself" (2004, promotional single)
- Eat Your Brains (2013)
- Dirty Rotten Scoundrels (2013)
- Losers (2014, intended to be released in 2004 as the band's debut album)
- The Rejects (2014, demos recorded in 2003 before getting signed)
- Cunt (2015, demos and rehearsals recorded by the 2004-era S&B live band in a more pop-punk style)
