= British Independent Film Awards 2026 =

29th British Independent Film Awards
- Awarded for: Best in British independent film
- Date: 6 December 2026
- Site: Roundhouse, London
- Official website: www.bifa.film

Highlights
- Most nominations: Elsinore (12)

The British Independent Film Awards 2026 are scheduled to be held on 6 December 2026 to recognise the best in British independent cinema and filmmaking talent from United Kingdom. The ceremony will take place at the Roundhouse in London, for the third time in a row.

The shortlists for multiple categories, including Best International Independent Film and Breakthrough Performance were revealed through October 2026. The nominations were announced on 3 November 2026 by Jay Lycurgo and Posy Sterling. Simon Stone's biographical drama Elsinore led the nominations with twelve, followed by I See Buildings Fall like Lightning with eight and Animol with seven. The award for Cinema of the Year was introduced.

== Winners and nominees ==
Winners will be listed in bold.

Best British Independent Film	Best Director
Effi o Blaenau – Marc Evans, Gary Owen, Branwen Cennard; Elsinore – Simon Stone, Stephen Beresford, Andrea Occhipinti, Gabrielle Tana, Pete Shilaimon, Mickey Liddell, Stefano Massenzi, Carolyn Marks Blackwood, Andrew Scott; I See Buildings Fall like Lightning – Clio Barnard, Enda Walsh, Tracy O'Riordan; Queen at Sea – Lance Hammer, Tristan Goligher; Tender Loving Care – Mike Leigh, Georgina Lowe	Clio Barnard – I See Buildings Fall like Lightning; Andrew Haigh – A Long Winter; Mark Jenkin – Rose of Nevada; Mike Leigh – Tender Loving Care; Simon Stone – Elsinore
Best Lead Performance	Best Supporting Performance
Juliette Binoche – Queen at Sea as Amanda Powell; Erin Doherty – Faith as Gina; Leisa Gwenllian – Effi o Blaenau as Effi; Jonathan Jules – Florid as Jamal; Tut Nyuot – Animol as Troy; Andrew Scott – Elsinore as Ian Charleson	Anna Calder-Marshall – Queen at Sea as Leslie Carville; Tom Courtenay – Queen at Sea as Martin Carville; Sekou Diaby – Animol as Dion; Claire Foy – Ink as Jules Davies; Billie Piper – Elsinore as Patsy Pollock; Bill Pullman – Everybody Digs Bill Evans as Harry Evans
Best Joint Lead Performance	Breakthrough Performance
Séamus McLean Ross and Samuel Bottomley – California Schemin' as Gavin "Brains" Bain and Billy "Silibil" Boyd; Flora Nicholson, Clare Dunne and Mia Tharia – The Education of Jane Cumming as Jane Pirie, Marianne Woods and Jane Cumming; Marni Duggan and Galaxie Clear – Extra Geography as Flic and Minna; Chimpaye Florence Mariserena and Bizimana Hussain – Small Gods as Florence and Bizimana	Galaxie Clear – Extra Geography as Minna; Sekou Diaby – Animol as Dion; Leisa Gwenllian – Effi o Blaenau as Effi; Jonathan Jules – Florid as Jamal; Tut Nyuot – Animol as Troy
Best Ensemble Performance
I See Buildings Fall like Lightning – Anthony Boyle, Joe Cole, Jay Lycurgo, Daryl McCormack, Lola Petticrew; Sunny Dancer – Bella Ramsey, Daniel Quinn-Toye, Ruby Stokes, Earl Cave, Conrad Khan, Jasmine Elcock, Shalom Brune-Franklin, Louis Gaunt, Josie Walker, Jessica Gunning, James Norton, Neil Patrick Harris, James Blunt; Tender Loving Care – Marion Bailey, Paul Jesson, Kate O'Flynn, Alice Bailey Johnson
Best Screenplay	Best Documentary
Elsinore – Stephen Beresford; Queen at Sea – Lance Hammer; Tender Loving Care – Mike Leigh; Effi o Blaenau – Gary Owen; I See Buildings Fall like Lightning – Enda Walsh	All Rivers Spill Their Stories to the Sea – Jeanie Finlay, Charlie Phillips; Everybody to Kenmure Street – Felipe Bustos Sierra, Ciara Barry; One in a Million – Itab Azzam, Jack MacInnes, Will Anderson, Andrew Palmer, James Bluemel, Raney Aronson-Rath; Something Familiar – Rachel Taparjan, Aleksandra Bilic, Monica Lăzurean-Gorgan; We, the Hated – Rich Felgate, David Allen
Best International Independent Film	Best Short Film
All of a Sudden – Ryusuke Hamaguchi, Léa Le Dimna, David Gauquié, Julien Deris, Kôsuke Oshida, Yûji Sadai, Jean-Luc Ormières, Renan Artukmaç, Hiroko Matsuda; Club Kid – Jordan Firstman, Galen Core, Alex Coco; La bola negra – Javier Ambrossi, Javier Calvo; La Gradiva – Marine Atlan, Anne Brouilet, Inès Daïen Dasi; Possible Love – Lee Chang-dong, Oh Jung-mi	Allies in Exile – Hasan Kattan, Orlando von Einsiedel; Coyotes – Said Zagha, Myriam Sassine, Laura Jumel; Forgotten Spaceman – Elham Ehsas, Lorraine Bhattachary; Untitled Woman – Camille Summers-Valli, Rosmarie Vind, Sorcha Bacon, Martha McGuirk, David Zander; Vote Gavin Lyle – Aneil Karia, Scott O'Donnell, Tom Gardner
Best Casting	Best Cinematography
I See Buildings Fall like Lightning – Shaheen Baig; Animol – Heather Basten; Florid – Lara Manwaring; Extra Geography – Lucy Pardee; Elsinore – Jessica Ronane	Elsinore – Mike Eley; Everybody Digs Bill Evans – Piers McGrail; Straight Circle – Christopher Ripley; I See Buildings Fall like Lightning – Simon Tindall; A Long Winter – André Turpin
Best Costume Design	Best Editing
The Incomer – Sarah Blenkinsop; Savage House – Alex Boivard; A Long Winter – Carol Case; Straight Circle – Darion Hing; Elsinore – Mel Page	Elsinore – Valerio Bonelli; Black Is Beautiful: The Kwame Brathwaite Story – Otto Burnham; Straight Circle – Fouad Gaber; I See Buildings Fall like Lightning – Maya Maffioli; Ink – Fin Oates
Best Effects	Best Make-Up & Hair Design
Shaun the Sheep: The Beast of Mossy Bottom – Jon Biggins, Jeff Dillon; The Magic Faraway Tree – Ruslan Borysov, Richard Cheal, Tim Ledbury; The Incomer – Daniel Morris	Savage House – Jacquetta Levon; Elsinore – Nadia Stacey; Madfabulous – Nadia Stacey; The Magic Faraway Tree – Karen Hartley Thomas; Straight Circle – Tristan Versluis
Best Original Music	Best Music Supervision
Everybody Digs Bill Evans – Roger Goula; Rose of Nevada – Mark Jenkin; Elsinore – Stefan Gregory; Underland – Hannah Peel; Effi o Blaenau – Ioana Selaru, Sion Trefor	I See Buildings Fall like Lightning – Connie Farr; Queen at Sea – Connie Farr; Sunny Dancer – Phil Canning
Best Production Design	Best Sound
Straight Circle – Luke Moran-Morris; Ink – Gareth Pugh, Carson McColl; Elsinore – Helen Scott; The Magic Faraway Tree – Alexandra Walker; Savage House – Gary Williamson	Everybody Digs Bill Evans – Andy Coles, John Brennan; A Long Winter – Paul Cotterell, Ron Osiowy, Joakim Sundström; Ink – Simon Hayes, Johnnie Burn; Rose of Nevada – Mark Jenkin, Ian Wilson; Florid – Dario Swade, George Elliott, Tom Harburt
Douglas Hickox Award (Best Debut Director)	Best Debut Screenwriter
Billy Lumby – Florid; Molly Manners – Extra Geography; Bertil Nilsson – Masc; Louis Paxton – The Incomer; Ashley Walters – Animol	Miriam Battye – Extra Geography; Thea Gajic – Surviving Earth; Rhys Marc Jones – Black Church Bay; Jess O'Kane – Bad Apples; Louis Paxton – The Incomer
Breakthrough Producer	The Raindance Maverick Award
Itab Azzam, Jack MacInnes, Will Anderson, James Bluemel, Andrew Palmer – One in a Million [also produced by Raney Aronson-Rath]; Branwen Cennard – Effi o Blaenau; Tom Hawlins – Animol [also produced by Joy Gharoro-Akpojotor, Nick Love, and Ashley Walters]; Oskar Pimlott – Bad Apples; Alex Polunin – Black Church Bay [also produced by Tristan Goligher]	Act 3 – Christine Molloy, Joe Lawlor, Alex Thiele, Hannah Patterson; Chatlines – Neil Ely, Lloyd Eyre-Morgan, Paul Mortlock; Masc – Bertil Nilsson; The Peril at Pincer Point – Jake Kuhn, Noah Stratton-Twine; Something Familiar – Rachel Taparjan, Monica Lăzurean-Gorgan, Elena Martin, Aleksandra Bilic
Best Debut Director – Feature Documentary	Cinema of the Year
Janay Boulos, Abd Alkader Habak – Birds of War; Ed Sayers – Super Nature; Rachel Taparjan – Something Familiar	Abbeygate Cinema; Campus West; Hippodrome Cinema; The Kinema in the Woods; The Ultimate Picture Palace

=== Films with multiple nominations and awards ===
Films that received multiple nominations
Nominations	Film
12	Elsinore
8	I See Buildings Fall like Lightning
7	Animol
6	Effi o Blaenau
6	Queen at Sea
5	Florid
5	Straight Circle
5	Extra Geography
4	Everybody Digs Bill Evans
4	Tender Loving Care
4	A Long Winter
4	Ink
4	The Incomer
3	Rose of Nevada
3	The Magic Faraway Tree
3	Savage House
3	Something Familiar
2	One in a Million
2	Bad Apples
2	Black Church Bay
2	Masc
2	Sunny Dancer
