= British Independent Film Award for Best Lead Performance =

British film award

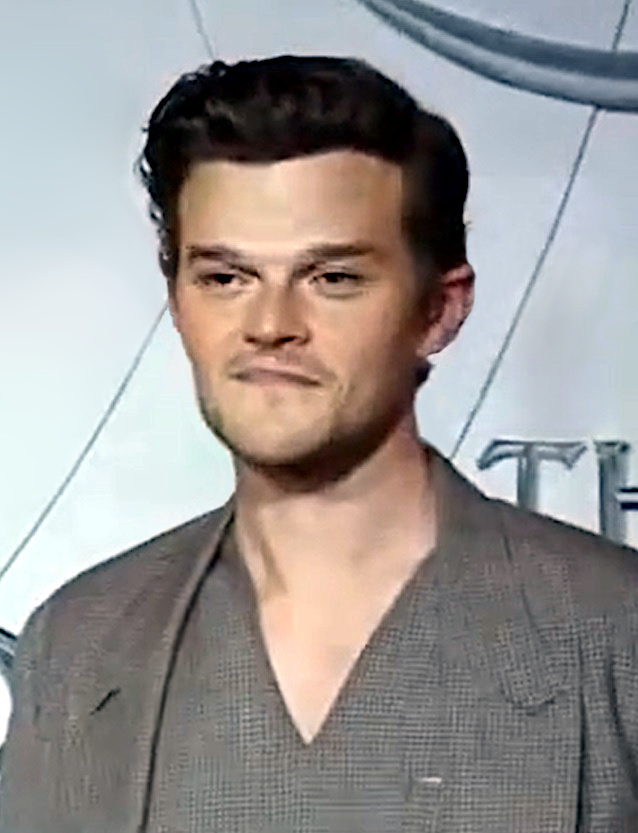
- 2025 Recipient: Robert Aramayo
- Awarded for: Best Leading Performance
- Country: United Kingdom
- Presented by: BIFA
- First award: 2022
- Currently held by: Robert Aramayo – I Swear (2025)
- Website: www.bifa.film

The British Independent Film Award for Best Lead Performance is an annual award given by the British Independent Film Awards (BIFA). The award was first presented in the 2022 ceremony. Rosy McEwen was the first recipient of the award for her work in Blue Jean.

From 1998 to 2021, leading performances were rewarded with two categories separated by gender: Best Performance by an Actor and Best Performance by an Actress. The change was made in 2022, creating this category alongside Best Supporting Performance and Best Joint Lead Performance.

== Winners and nominees ==
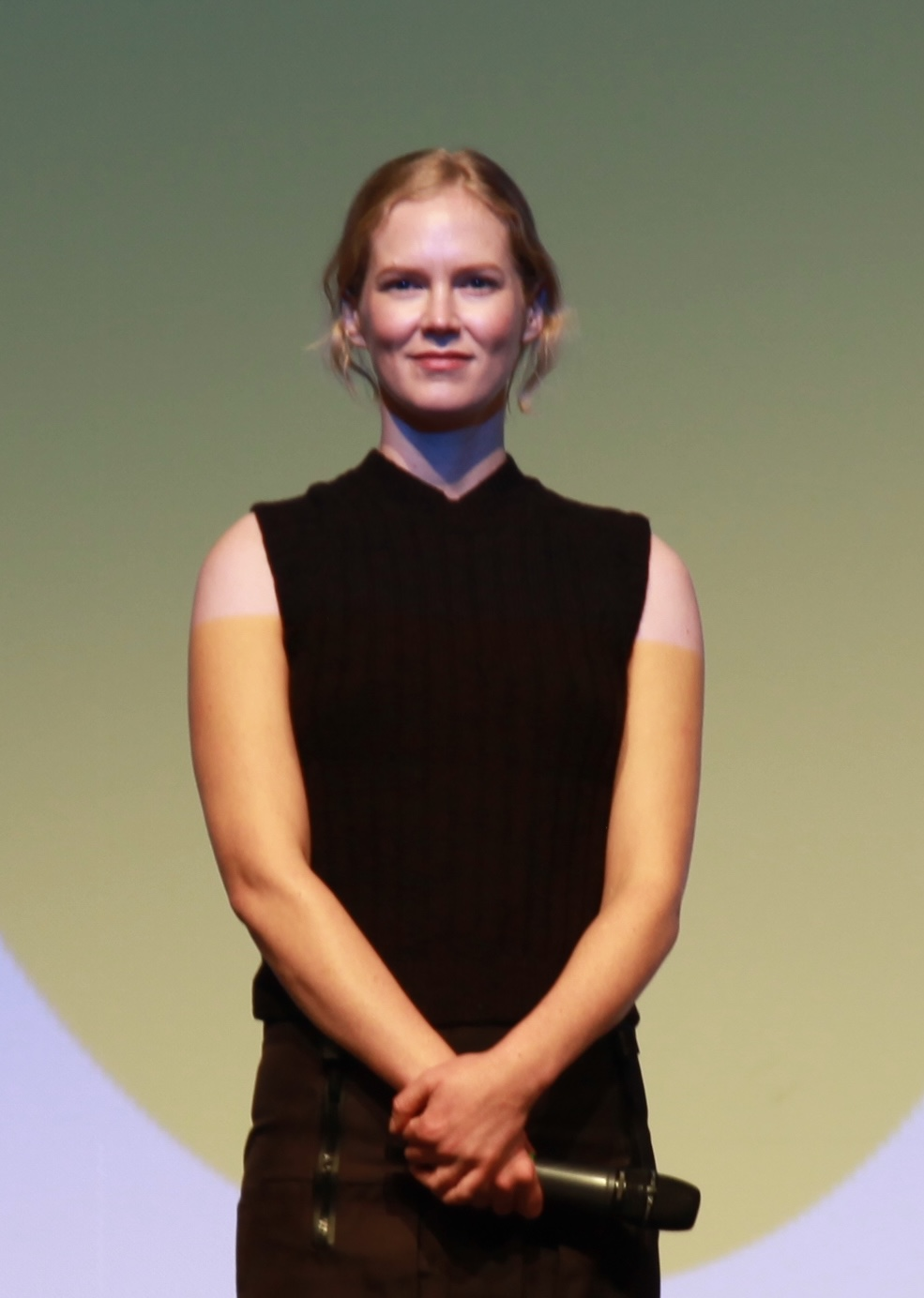
Rosy McEwen won for Blue Jean (2022).

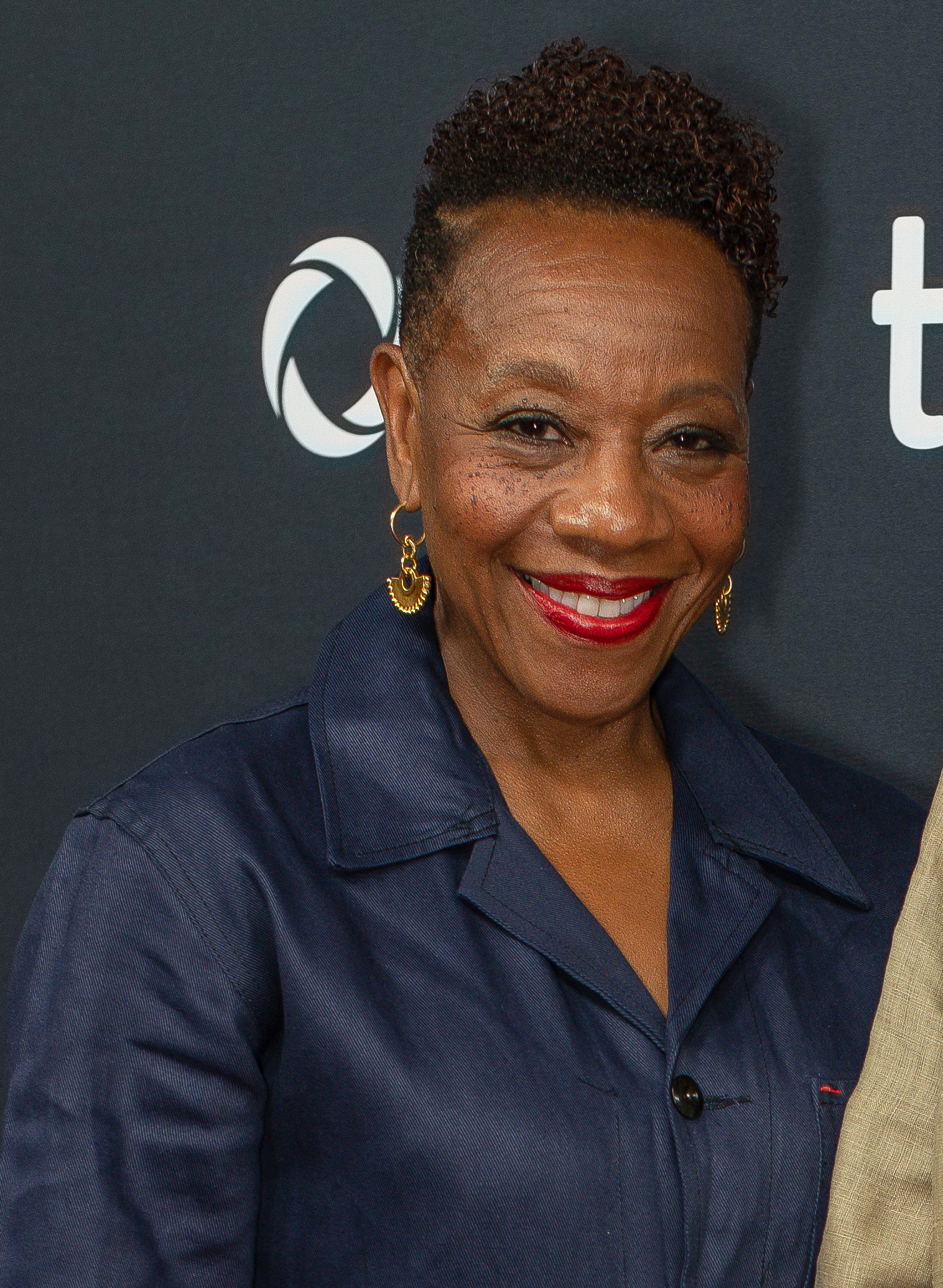
Marianne Jean-Baptiste won for Hard Truths (2024).

=== 2020s ===
Year	Performer	Film	Character
2022 (25th)	Rosy McEwen	Blue Jean	Jean
2022 (25th)	Sally Hawkins	The Lost King	Philippa Langley
2022 (25th)	Cosmo Jarvis	It Is In Us All	Hamish Considine
2022 (25th)	Emma Mackey	Emily	Emily Brontë
2022 (25th)	Bill Nighy	Living	Mr. Williams
2022 (25th)	Florence Pugh	The Wonder	Lib Wright
2022 (25th)	Emily Watson	God's Creatures	Aileen O'Hara
2022 (25th)	Hala Zein	Nezouh	Zeina
2023 (26th)	Mia McKenna-Bruce	How to Have Sex	Tara
2023 (26th)	Jodie Comer	The End We Start From	Mother
2023 (26th)	Tia Nomore	Earth Mama	Gia
2023 (26th)	Nabhaan Rizwan	In Camera	Aden
2023 (26th)	Andrew Scott	All of Us Strangers	Adam
2023 (26th)	Tilda Swinton	The Eternal Daughter	Julie and Rosalind Hart
2024 (27th)	Marianne Jean-Baptiste	Hard Truths	Pansy Deacon
2024 (27th)	Radhika Apte	Sister Midnight	Uma
2024 (27th)	Susan Chardy	On Becoming a Guinea Fowl	Shula
2024 (27th)	Elliot Page	Close to You	Sam
2024 (27th)	Saoirse Ronan	The Outrun	Rona
2024 (27th)	Alicia Vikander	The Assessment	Virginia
2025 (28th)	Robert Aramayo	I Swear	John Davidson
2025 (28th)	Frank Dillane	Urchin	Mike
2025 (28th)	David Jonsson	Wasteman	Taylor
2025 (28th)	Jennifer Lawrence	Die My Love	Grace
2025 (28th)	Harry Melling	Pillion	Colin
2025 (28th)	Cillian Murphy	Steve	Steve
2026 (29th)	Juliette Binoche	Queen at Sea	Amanda Powell
2026 (29th)	Erin Doherty	Faith	Gina
2026 (29th)	Leisa Gwenllian	Effi o Blaenau	Effi
2026 (29th)	Jonathan Jules	Florid	Jamal
2026 (29th)	Tut Nyuot	Animol	Troy
2026 (29th)	Andrew Scott	Elsinore	Ian Charleson

== See also ==
- BAFTA Award for Best Actor in a Leading Role
- BAFTA Award for Best Actress in a Leading Role
