= I See Buildings Fall like Lightning =

2026 drama film by Clio Barnard

- British theatrical release poster
- Directed by: Clio Barnard
- Screenplay by: Enda Walsh
- Based on: I See Buildings Fall like Lightning by Keiran Goddard
- Produced by: Tracy O'Riordan
- Starring: Anthony Boyle; Joe Cole; Jay Lycurgo; Daryl McCormack; Lola Petticrew
- Cinematography: Simon Tindall
- Edited by: Maya Maffioli
- Music by: Harry Escott
- Production companies: Moonspun Films; BBC Film; BFI
- Distributed by: Curzon Film (United Kingdom)
- Release dates: 20 May 2026 (Cannes); 4 December 2026 (United Kingdom)
- Running time: 109 minutes
- Countries: United Kingdom; France; United States
- Language: English

I See Buildings Fall like Lightning is a 2026 drama film directed by Clio Barnard, written by Enda Walsh and based on the book of the same name by Keiran Goddard. It stars Anthony Boyle, Joe Cole, Jay Lycurgo, Daryl McCormack and Lola Petticrew as five childhood friends who confront their unfulfilled dreams in the midst of the UK housing crisis.

The film had its world premiere at the Directors' Fortnight section of the 2026 Cannes Film Festival in 20 May, where it won the section's Audience Award. It received positive reviews from critics.

== Cast ==
- Anthony Boyle as Patrick
- Joe Cole as Rian
- Jay Lycurgo as Oli
- Daryl McCormack as Conor
- Lola Petticrew as Shiv
- Millie Brady as Emma
- Lucie Shorthouse as Sophie
- James Eeles as Marcus
- Ryan Walker-Edwards as Si
- Sam Brasnell as Kate
- Michael Horton

== Production ==
The novel by Keiran Goddard is adapted by Enda Walsh for the film directed by Clio Barnard. It has producer Tracy O’Riordan for Moonspun Films with funding from BBC Film and BFI and Curzon Film distributing. Goddard always thought the book had cinematic potential despite having long interior monologues.

Principal photography took place in the United Kingdom in April 2025, with locations including Birmingham. Cinematographer Simon Tindall shot the production in hybrid formats, 16mm film and digitally, marking his first collaboration with Barnard.

== Release ==
The film is scheduled to be released in the United Kingdom on 4 December 2026.

== Reception ==
=== Critical response ===
On review aggregator Rotten Tomatoes, the film holds an approval rating of 91% based on 23 reviews, with an average rating of 8.3/10. On Metacritic, the film has a weighted average score of 77 out of 100, based on nine critics, indicating "generally favorable reviews".

Peter Bradshaw in The Guardian praised the "warmth and heartfelt passion" of the central quintet in the cast in a five-star review and described the film as having a "mix of poignancy, defiance and contaminated euphoria [which] stayed with me hours after the closing credits". Nikki Baughan for Screen Daily called the film an "expertly-observed study of human relationships" but warned that "there are moments when the screenplay veers towards the soapbox…against the scourge of landlords, the inhumanity of capitalism, the stagnation of the working class" but that " these sentiments come from a place of genuine, brow-beaten human experience, rather than a filmmaker trying to make a political point". Hannah Strong in Little White Lies magazine wrote that "Boyle, Lycurgo and McCormack emerge as the stand-outs, portraying different aspects of modern masculinity thoughtfully" and that the film "displays the intricacies of male friendships with a real tenderness".

=== Accolades ===
Award	Year	Category	Recipient(s)	Result	Ref.
Cannes Film Festival	23 May 2026	Audience Award	Clio Barnard	Won	
Cannes Film Festival	23 May 2026	Palm Dog Award - Grand Jury Prize	Clio Barnard	Won	
British Independent Film Awards	6 December 2026	Best British Independent Film	Clio Barnard, Enda Walsh, Tracy O'Riordan	Pending	
British Independent Film Awards	6 December 2026	Best Director	Clio Barnard	Pending	
British Independent Film Awards	6 December 2026	Best Ensemble Performance	Anthony Boyle, Joe Cole, Jay Lycurgo, Daryl McCormack, Lola Petticrew	Pending	
British Independent Film Awards	6 December 2026	Best Screenplay	Enda Walsh	Pending	
British Independent Film Awards	6 December 2026	Best Casting	Shaheen Baig	Pending	
British Independent Film Awards	6 December 2026	Best Cinematography	Simon Tindall	Pending	
British Independent Film Awards	6 December 2026	Best Editing	Maya Maffioli	Pending	
British Independent Film Awards	6 December 2026	Best Music Supervision	Connie Farr	Pending	
