= British Independent Film Award for Best Supporting Performance =

British film award

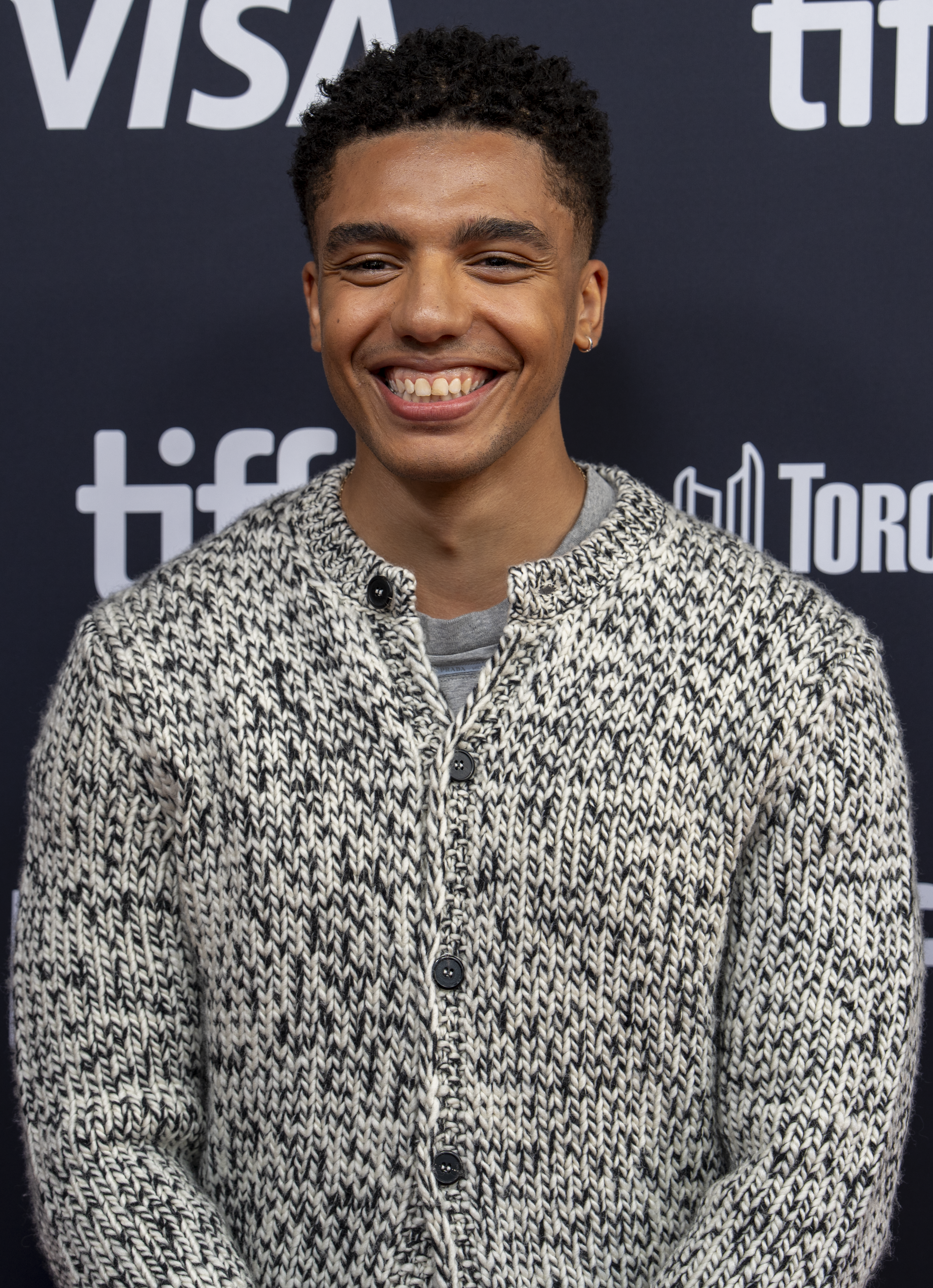
- 2025 Recipient: Jay Lycurgo
- Awarded for: Best Supporting Performance
- Country: United Kingdom
- Presented by: BIFA
- First award: 2022
- Currently held by: Jay Lycurgo – Steve (2025)
- Website: www.bifa.film

The British Independent Film Award for Best Supporting Performance is an annual award given by the British Independent Film Awards (BIFA). The award was first presented in the 2022 ceremony. Kerrie Hayes was the first recipient of the award for her work in Blue Jean.

From 2008 to 2021, supporting performances were rewarded with two categories separated by gender: Best Supporting Actor and Best Supporting Actress. The change was made in 2022, creating this category alongside Best Lead Performance and Best Joint Lead Performance.

== Winners and nominees ==
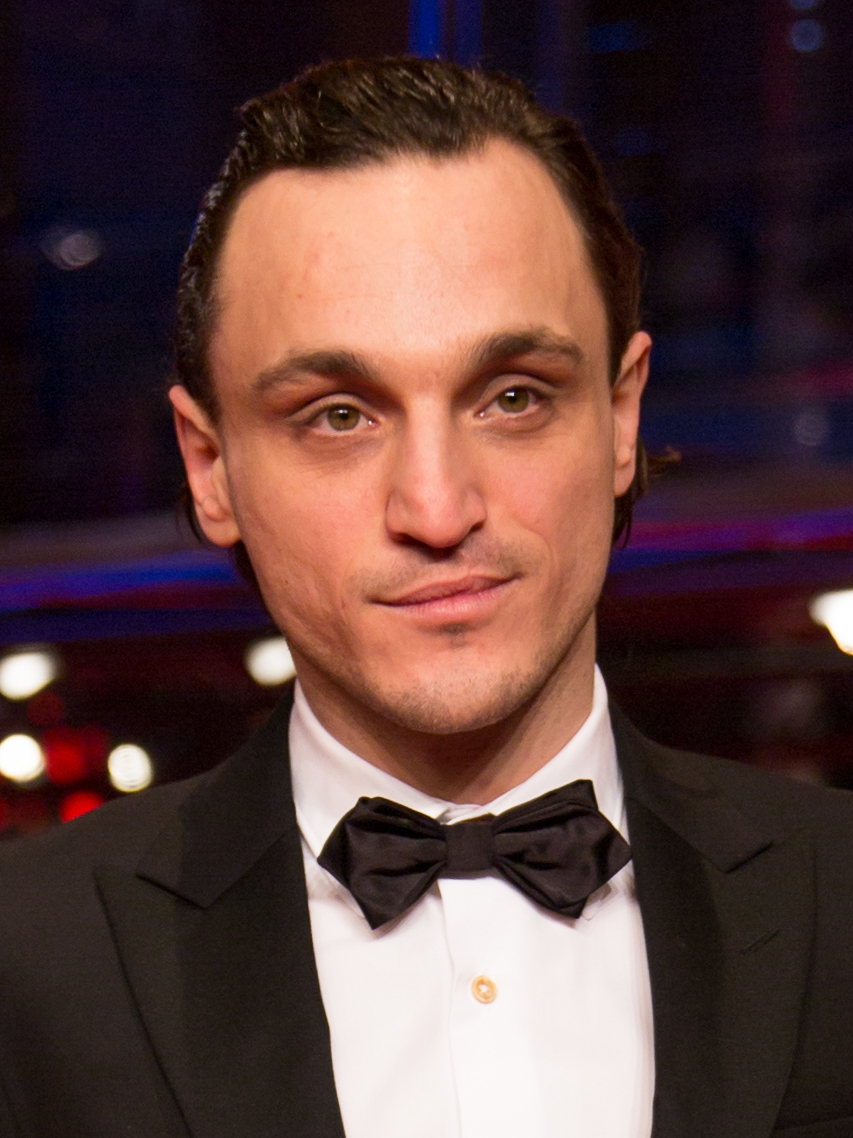
Franz Rogowski won for Bird (2024).

=== 2020s ===
Year	Performer	Film	Character
2022 (25th)	Kerrie Hayes	Blue Jean	Viv
2022 (25th)	Zoey Deutch	The Outfit	Mable Shaun
2022 (25th)	Aisling Franciosi	God's Creatures	Sarah Murphy
2022 (25th)	Paul Mescal	God's Creatures	Brian O'Hara
2022 (25th)	Lucy Halliday	Blue Jean	Lois
2022 (25th)	Zainab Joda	Our River... Our Sky	Reema
2022 (25th)	Fatma Mohamed	Flux Gourmet	Elle di Elle
2022 (25th)	Fionn Whitehead	Emily	Branwell Brontë
2022 (25th)	Aimee Lou Wood	Living	Margaret
2023 (25th)	Paul Mescal	All of Us Strangers	Harry
2023 (25th)	Shaun Thomas	How to Have Sex	Badger
2023 (25th)	Ritu Arya	Polite Society	Lena Khan
2023 (25th)	Jamie Bell	All of Us Strangers	Adam's father
2023 (25th)	Claire Foy	All of Us Strangers	Adam's mother
2023 (25th)	Samuel Bottomley	How to Have Sex	Paddy
2023 (25th)	Alexandra Burke	Pretty Red Dress	Candice
2023 (25th)	Amir El-Masry	In Camera	Conrad
2023 (25th)	Alia Shawkat	Drift	Callie
2023 (25th)	Katherine Waterston	The End We Start From	O
2024 (27th)	Franz Rogowski	Bird	Bird
2024 (27th)	Michele Austin	Hard Truths	Chantelle
2024 (27th)	Elizabeth Chisela	On Becoming a Guinea Fowl	Nsansa
2024 (27th)	Barry Keoghan	Bird	Bug
2024 (27th)	Jack O'Connell	Back to Black	Blake Fielder-Civil
2024 (27th)	Hayley Squires	Hoard	Cynthia
2025 (28th)	Jay Lycurgo	Steve	Shy
2025 (28th)	Tom Blyth	Wasteman	Dee
2025 (28th)	Scott Ellis Watson	I Swear	Young John Davidson
2025 (28th)	Peter Mullan	I Swear	Tommy Trotter
2025 (28th)	Maxine Peake	I Swear	Dottie Achenbach
2025 (28th)	Alexander Skarsgård	Pillion	Ray
2026 (29th)	Anna Calder-Marshall	Queen at Sea	Leslie Carville
2026 (29th)	Tom Courtenay	Queen at Sea	Martin Carville
2026 (29th)	Sekou Diaby	Animol	Dion
2026 (29th)	Claire Foy	Ink	Jules Davies
2026 (29th)	Billie Piper	Elsinore	Patsy Pollock
2026 (29th)	Bill Pullman	Everybody Digs Bill Evans	Harry Evans

== Multiple nominations ==
2 nominations

- Paul Mescal

== See also ==
- BAFTA Award for Best Actor in a Supporting Role
- BAFTA Award for Best Actress in a Supporting Role
