= Elsinore (film) =

2026 film by Simon Stone

- Theatrical release poster
- Directed by: Simon Stone
- Screenplay by: Stephen Beresford
- Produced by: Andrea Occhipinti; Gabrielle Tana; Pete Shilaimon; Mickey Liddell; Stefano Massenzi; Carolyn Marks Blackwood; Andrew Scott
- Starring: Andrew Scott; Olivia Colman; Billie Piper; Johnny Flynn; Luke Thompson; David Dawson; Matthew Beard; Joe Locke; Juliet Stevenson; Peter Mullan
- Cinematography: Mike Eley
- Edited by: Valerio Bonelli
- Music by: Stefan Gregory
- Production companies: Lucky Red; Magnolia Mae Films
- Distributed by: StudioCanal (United Kingdom); Focus Features (United States); Lucky Red (Italy)
- Release dates: 4 September 2026 (Telluride); 20 November 2026 (United States); 28 January 2027 (Italy); 29 January 2027 (United Kingdom)
- Running time: 111 minutes
- Countries: Italy; United Kingdom; United States
- Language: English
- Box office: $240,000

Elsinore is a 2026 biographical drama film directed by Simon Stone and written by Stephen Beresford. It focuses on Scottish actor Ian Charleson (1949–1990) and his performances as Hamlet at the National Theatre in the final months of his life, and the odds he faced in preparing for and performing the role while seriously ill from AIDS. The film stars Andrew Scott as Charleson, alongside Olivia Colman as his doctor Margaret Johnson. The supporting cast includes Billie Piper, Johnny Flynn, Luke Thompson, David Dawson, Matthew Beard, Joe Locke, Juliet Stevenson and Peter Mullan.

Elsinore had its world premiere at the 53rd Telluride Film Festival on 4 September 2026, and is scheduled to be theatrically released in the United States by Focus Features on 20 November 2026, in Italy on 28 January 2027 by Lucky Red and in the United Kingdom by StudioCanal on 29 January 2027. The film received positive reviews from critics, with particular praise for Scott's performance.

== Plot ==
In 1989, 40-year old actor Ian Charleson juggles film roles and his reputation for starring in Chariots of Fire while privately battling AIDS, which has begun to show on his body through Kaposi's sarcoma lesions. When Daniel Day-Lewis suddenly storms off the stage during a performance of Hamlet at the National Theatre, director Richard Eyre reaches out to Ian about replacing him. Having long felt dissatisfied with his previous attempt at playing Hamlet, Ian sees this as his second and last chance to do his dream role justice. He accepts the part but discloses his condition to Richard, who reluctantly agrees to keep his secret despite his own concerns for Ian's well-being.

On the advice of a friend, Charleson seeks treatment from Margaret Johnson at the Royal Free Hospital's AIDS ward. Johnson strongly advises against performing the strenuous role of Hamlet, but Charleson persuades her that he will continue treatment while performing. He divides his time between appointments at the hospital and rehearsals for Hamlet at the National, with friends Patsy Pollock and Sean Mathias coming to support and care for him. Ian spars with his friend Derek Jarman, who feels Ian has turned his back on the gay community by hiding his condition, while Ian argues he does not want to be defined in public by his sexuality or illness.

The physical demands of the role combined with the illness take its toll, and Ian is further devastated when his friend and former lover Georgie dies. Eventually, Ian is hospitalized with pneumonia on the eve of the first preview. Richard promises the role is open for him when he recovers, but Johnson forbids him from returning to the stage. Ian meets with his parents and apologizes for not disclosing his sexuality or illness to them.

While recuperating in the AIDS ward, Ian bonds with fellow patients, including Nicholas, an admirer of his and an aspiring actor whose career has been stalled by his illness. Ian organizes a ballroom performance to give Nicholas and the other patients a chance to perform and cheer up the others, which Johnson enjoys. Ian's health stabilizes, but he insists to Johnson that while he could maintain his health for a few more years, he would rather risk dying while playing Hamlet than continue fighting a losing battle with his illness.

Ian reconciles with Derek, pledging to have his sexuality and illness announced to the public upon his death. With Johnson's approval, Ian returns to the National and discloses his illness to the rest of the cast and crew, who are supportive and help assist him backstage so he can power through performances. The production opens to rave reviews. While being comforted by Patsy, Ian is asked to think of a place that makes him happy: he pictures his time rehearsing and performing in Hamlet, as well as the love shown to him by family, friends, and castmates.

A postscript explains Ian made it through 24 performances of his run of Hamlet, passing away seven weeks later. It also reveals Margaret Johnson's AIDS clinic at the Royal Free Hospital vastly improved the quality of life for thousands of AIDS patients, and was renamed in 1992 to the "Ian Charleson Day Centre."

== Cast ==
- Andrew Scott as Ian Charleson
- Olivia Colman as Margaret Johnson, Charleson's doctor
- Billie Piper as Patsy Pollock, a casting director who nurses Charleson during his last days
- Sadie Soverall as Alice, Patsy Pollock's daughter
- Johnny Flynn as Richard Eyre, who directs Charleson in Hamlet at the National Theatre
- Luke Thompson as Georgie, a close friend of Charleson's who is dying
- Monica Dolan as Linda Tolhurst, the National Theatre's longtime stage-door supervisor
- Joe Locke as Nicholas, a young fellow patient in the AIDS ward at the hospital
- Matthew Beard as Sean Mathias, a director and Charleson's close friend and caregiver
- David Dawson as Derek Jarman, an openly gay director who had directed Charleson in Jubilee, his first film role
- Louis Healy as Keith Collins, Derek Jarman's longtime companion and manager
- Dickie Beau as Sister Belladonna, member of the London branch of the activist drag group the Sisters of Perpetual Indulgence
- Kadiff Kirwan as Sister Frigidity of the Nocturnal Emission, member of the activist drag group the Sisters of Perpetual Indulgence
- Peter Mullan as Jack, Charleson's father
- Georgie Glen as Jean, Charleson's mother
- Juliet Stevenson as Sylvia Syms, the actress who plays Gertrude
- Danny Webb as Michael Bryant, the actor who plays Polonius
- Jamie Bogyo as Jeremy Northam, the actor who plays Laertes
- Alyth Ross as Stella Gonet, the actress who plays Ophelia
- David Rintoul as David Burke, the actor who plays the Ghost
- Malcolm Jeffries as the actor who plays Fortinbras
- John Hollingworth as the actor who plays Rosencrantz
- Rishi Rian as the actor who plays Guildenstern
- Adeel Akhtar as Shahid, a motorcycle salesman who has a motorbike named Elsinore
- Ronkẹ Adékoluẹjo as Nurse Lee, at the Royal Free Hospital

== Production ==
=== Development ===
The concept of a film about Charleson, starring Andrew Scott, was originally introduced by executive producer Ethan Silverman, who had been heading a prospective film project about Charleson that was a road-trip story set in Italy with a script by Stephen Beresford. Producer Gabrielle Tana was introduced to the project but felt the film should not be a road trip; she rehired Beresford, who mentioned that he wanted the film to be tied to Charleson's final Hamlet at the National Theatre. Another director was originally offered the picture, but they later learned that Tana had gone with Stone via a third party.

The scope of Elsinore then evolved organically between producer/star Scott, director Simon Stone, and screenwriter Beresford, who are all screen and stage veterans and who shared and refined their ideas in a WhatsApp group chat called "The Charleson Chaps". They focused the story on human resilience, the LGBT community, and the experience of a visible but closeted gay actor in the 1980s. They also searched through Hamlet to find passages that most strongly connected to Charleson's story.

Scott, who had played Hamlet in 150 Olivier Award-nominated London stage performances in 2017, lost a significant amount of weight for the role of the ailing Charleson. Beresford interviewed the still-living members of Charleson's inner circle from that time, including his best friend David Rintoul, who was cast in the film as the actor playing the Ghost of Hamlet's father. The filmmakers structured the movie like a traditional humanist Hollywood drama from the 1970s, 1980s, and 1990s, such as sports drama films like Rocky, including montages. They also included a good deal of humor and lightness in the script.

The title of the film refers to Elsinore and Elsinore Castle, the setting in Denmark of the play Hamlet. According to Steve Pond writing in TheWrap, the film is "named for the Danish castle where Prince Hamlet lives, but the title is deliberately evocative of the forbidding National Theatre building in London. Stone and cinematographer Mike Eley shoot the Brutalist structure in a manner befitting a monument, often as not with its stark columns looming above the characters' heads."

=== Casting ===
Everyone cast in the film had either worked with Scott or had previous connections with him, or had worked with Stone or Beresford. Luke Thompson, Juliet Stevenson, and David Rintoul had all co-starred in Robert Icke's 2017 production of Hamlet, starring Scott, on the London stage, which transferred to the West End and was filmed and broadcast on BBC Two in 2018.

Nigel Havers, Charleson's co-star in Chariots of Fire (1981), and Hilton McRae, Charleson's close friend and University of Edinburgh classmate and fellow actor, have brief cameos in the film as financial donors to the AIDS clinic.

=== Filming ===
Principal photography began on 5 January 2026, in the United Kingdom, and concluded in February 2026. Post-production was completed August 26, 2026.

== Release ==
Elsinore premiered on 4 September 2026 at the 53rd Telluride Film Festival. It had its Canadian premiere in the Special Presentations section of the 2026 Toronto International Film Festival on 12 September 2026. It opened the 2026 BFI London Film Festival on 7 October 2026, marking its European premiere.

Initial reports in December 2025 about the film's production stated that LD Entertainment, also a co-producer on the film, had pre-emptively acquired North American distribution rights to it. By July 2026, following interest from every major fall festival, a competitive bidding war among distributors ensued and Focus Features acquired distribution rights to the film for North and Latin America.

Elsinore is scheduled for an initial limited theatrical release in the United States beginning 20 November 2026, with expansions throughout November and December. It will be theatrically released in Italy by Lucky Red on 28 January 2027, and in the United Kingdom by StudioCanal on 29 January 2027.

== Reception ==
=== Critical response ===
On the review aggregator website Rotten Tomatoes, 87% of 92 critics' reviews are positive, with an average rating of 7.7/10. Metacritic, which uses a weighted average, assigns the film a score of 74 out of 100, based on 31 critics, indicating "generally favorable" reviews.

Initial reviews following the film's Telluride and TIFF premieres broadly and unanimously praised Scott's "role of a lifetime" performance as Charleson. The film itself was also praised as affecting and moving. Certain reviewers critiqued the film's scoring, editing, or directing, including what some perceived as heavy-handedness in the scoring and montage of the film's final moments.

Mainstream news sources have also praised Scott's performance and found the film moving, with The Times proclaiming that "Andrew Scott’s tearjerker will win him an Oscar". Tim Robey in The Telegraph calls Scott "perfect .... [a]ngelically so." Robey also notes that "The script ... is not short on wicked gallows humour and straight-up zingers, so much so that the film’s first half is almost indecently entertaining, with a string of witty moments for the supporting cast .... The good stuff in here is not only about gay shame and hiding it away, but the backstage frivolity of an actor’s life." He concludes that the film is however not perfect because "Stone, in cahoots with his composer and editor, reduces the last act into a mulch of iffy montages, leaving us yearning for proper scenes with the actors, intimate agony and longer conversations."

=== Accolades ===
Award	Date	Category	Recipient(s)	Result	Ref.
Toronto International Film Festival	20 September 2026	International People's Choice Award	Elsinore	Won	
Mill Valley Film Festival	3 October 2026	Acting Award	Andrew Scott	Won	
Montclair Film Festival	18 October 2026	Screenwriter Award	Stephen Beresford	Won	
Middleburg Film Festival	18 October 2026	Distinguished Makeup and Hair Design Award	Nadia Stacey	Won	
San Diego International Film Festival	26 Ocotober 2026	Audience Award: Best Gala	Elsinore	Won	
SCAD Savannah Film Festival	28 October 2026	Marquee Award	Billie Piper	Won	
Gotham Independent Film Awards	30 November 2026	Outstanding Lead Performance	Andrew Scott	Pending	
Gotham Independent Film Awards	30 November 2026	Legacy Tribute	Andrew Scott, Stephen Beresford, and Simon Stone	Won	
British Independent Film Awards	6 December 2026	Best British Independent Film	Simon Stone, Stephen Beresford, Andrea Occhipinti, Gabrielle Tana, Pete Shilaimon, Mickey Liddell, Stefano Massenzi, Carolyn Marks Blackwood, Andrew Scott	Pending	
British Independent Film Awards	6 December 2026	Best Director	Simon Stone	Pending	
British Independent Film Awards	6 December 2026	Best Lead Performance	Andrew Scott	Pending	
British Independent Film Awards	6 December 2026	Best Supporting Performance	Billie Piper	Pending	
British Independent Film Awards	6 December 2026	Best Screenplay	Stephen Beresford	Pending	
British Independent Film Awards	6 December 2026	Best Casting	Jessica Ronane	Pending	
British Independent Film Awards	6 December 2026	Best Cinematography	Mike Eley	Pending	
British Independent Film Awards	6 December 2026	Best Costume Design	Mel Page	Pending	
British Independent Film Awards	6 December 2026	Best Editing	Valerio Bonelli	Pending	
British Independent Film Awards	6 December 2026	Best Make-Up & Hair Design	Nadia Stacey	Pending	
British Independent Film Awards	6 December 2026	Best Original Music	Stefan Gregory	Pending	
British Independent Film Awards	6 December 2026	Best Production Design	Helen Scott	Pending	
European Film Awards	16 January 2027	Best European Actor	Andrew Scott	Pending	
European Film Awards	16 January 2027	Best European Casting Director	Jessica Ronane	Pending	
