= Kadiff Kirwan =

British actor

- Born: 3 February 1989 (age 37); Plymouth, Montserrat
- Education: Central School of Speech and Drama
- Occupations: Actor; writer
- Years active: 2013–present

Kadiff Kirwan (born 3 February 1989) is a British-Montserratian actor and writer. He is known for his roles in several British television series, particularly Chewing Gum, Timewasters, The Stranger, and Slow Horses.

== Early life and education ==
Kadiff Kirwan was born on 3 February 1989 and raised in Plymouth, Montserrat. Kirwan moved with his family to Antigua, at the age of 7, after the 1995 Soufrière Hills volcanic eruption destroyed the family home. After two years in Antigua, Kirwan's family moved to Preston, England.

Kirwan said that he was misbehaving at school and not doing well until his Year 9 drama teacher persuaded him to attend drama classes after school. He realised his misbehaviour was due to grappling with being secretly gay, later saying that acting "saved me. It gave me my voice". At 14 Kirwan was cast in a school production of Bugsy Malone.

He graduated from the Central School of Speech and Drama in 2011.

== Career ==
Kirwan is an actor and writer. He has had roles in several British television series, including Chewing Gum, This Way Up, Slow Horses, and The Stranger. He has said that he enjoys acting on stage more than on screen.

== Personal life ==
In a 2022 interview with Attitude, he spoke about coming out as queer to his family. He has been in a relationship with Ben Whishaw since 2022.

== Filmography ==
=== Film ===
Year	Title	Role
2018	Mary Queen of Scots	Attaché
2019	Pokémon Detective Pikachu	Mayor
2022	My Policeman	Nigel
2026	Ladies First	Austin
2026	Supergirl	Bomar
2026	Elsinore	Sister Frigidity of the Nocturnal Emission

=== Television ===
Year	Title	Role	Notes
2015	Call the Midwife	Terence Bissette	Episode: "4.2"
2015	Crims	Jason	6 episodes
2015–2017	Chewing Gum	Aaron	8 episodes
2016	Comedy Feeds	James	Episode: "Pumped"
2016	Black Mirror	Chester	Episode: "Nosedive"
2016	Drifters	Patrick	3 episodes
2017	Drunk History	Knight	Episode: "King Arthur/Eric Liddell"
2017	Queers	Fredrick	Episode: "Safest Spot in Town"
2017	C.B. Strike	Guy Somé	3 episodes
2018	Informer	Adrian Hodge	Episode: "No Sleep Till Brooklyn"
2018	Zapped	Bramble	3 episodes
2019	Flack	Gary	Episode: "Patrick"
2019	Fleabag	Anthony	Episode: "2.5"
2019	Timewasters	Jason	12 episodes
2019	The Capture	DS Charlie Fereday	Episode: "What Happens in Helmand"
2019	This Way Up	Bradley	5 episodes
2019	The Big Narstie Show	Himself	Episode: "2.4"
2020	The Stranger	DC Wesley Ross	8 episodes
2020	Inside No. 9	Sam	Episode: "Death Be Not Proud"
2020	I May Destroy You	Officer Tom	Episode: "...It Just Came Up"
2020	Death in Paradise	Henri Dupre	Episode: "Death in the Salon"
2021	Time	Pete	Episode: "1.1"
2021	Dodo	Pete Wilson	20 episodes
2022	This Is Going to Hurt	Julian	6 episodes
2022–2024	Slow Horses	Marcus Longridge	18 episodes
2023	Everyone Else Burns	Andrew	11 episodes
2025	Doctor Who	Mike Gabbastone	Episode: "The Interstellar Song Contest"
2026	RuPaul's Drag Race UK	Himself	Guest judge; Episode: "Ghost Hunties"

=== Theatre ===
Year	Title	Role	Venue
2013	Home	Nadia Fall	The Shed, Royal National Theatre
2015	The Vote	Jerome Hanikie	Donmar Warehouse
2019	Guys and Dolls	Sky Masterson	Crucible Theatre
2024	The Hot Wing King	Cordell	Dorfman Theatre, Royal National Theatre
2026	The Resistible Rise of Arturo Ui	Roma	Swan Theatre, Stratford-upon-Avon (Royal Shakespeare Company)
