= Lobby Land =

BBC Radio show

- Genre: Comedy
- Running time: 28 minutes
- Country of origin: United Kingdom
- Language(s): English
- Home station: BBC Radio 4
- Starring: Ophelia Lovibond, Charlie Higson, Yasmine Akram
- Written by: Christopher Davies; Alistair Griggs; Jon Harvey; Sarah Dempster
- Produced by: Jon Harvey
- Executive producer(s): Lucy Armitage
- Original release: 5 September 2017 – 16 August 2019
- No. of series: 2 plus pilot
- No. of episodes: 10
- Website: Lobby Land at BBC Online

Lobby Land is a British political satire broadcast on BBC Radio 4. It centres on political editor Samantha Peakes of fictional clickbait website Hot Takes as she tries to scoop a story from the events in Westminster and avoid losing her job. It is very topical, using current events to form part of the story, and was commissioned as "a sharp satirical sitcom for post-Brexit Britain". It is created, produced and co-written by Jon Harvey.

== Characters ==
=== Principal cast ===
- Samantha (Sam) Peakes, political editor of the clickbait website Hot Takes, who has to fight to ensure her job and politics articles are secure. The actor playing Samantha has changed with each series: for the pilot it was Gemma Whelan, for series 1 it was Ophelia Lovibond and for series 2 it was Yasmine Akram.
- Mia Phillips, played by Cariad Lloyd, is a showbiz reporter for Hot Takes who specialises in listicle and clickbait articles. She is a close friend of Sam and the two share a flat.
- Tom Shriver MP, played by Charlie Higson, is one of Sam's key sources in Westminster and is often involved in every episode in some way. For series 1, he was identified as a Conservative MP but from series 2 onwards he is identified as an independent.
- Sam is often accompanied by an intern, Scot Lawrence Mills played by Ryan Sampson in series 1 and Nathan Edmonds played by Daniel Lawrence Taylor in series 2.
- Sam often has to contend with the editor of Hot Takes, who is Dom Bell in series 1, played by Lewis MacLeod, and Gideon Burnside in series 2, played by Dan Tetsell.

== Episode list ==
=== Pilot ===
No. overall	No. in season	Title	Original release date
1	1	"Pass the Source"	5 September 2017
As parliament returns from its summer recess, in Westminster the halls are alive with the sound of gossip, but young political editor Sam Peakes is struggling to stay afloat. Having drawn the short straw at work, she's being tailed around by Lawrence the office intern, and she needs a story - fast.

=== Series one ===
The cast for the first series was largely the same as that of the pilot with the main change being the replacement of Whelan with Lovibond for Sam Peakes. The series was produced by Hat Trick Productions. The plot of the first episode of the series overlaps significantly with the plot of the pilot with both focused on Sam finding a Westminster source.

No. overall	No. in season	Title	Original release date
2	1	"Frozen Out"	7 June 2018
It's summer in Westminster and the halls are alive with the sound of gossip, but young political editor Sam Peakes is struggling to stay afloat. Having drawn the short straw at work, she's being tailed around by Lawrence the office intern, and she needs a story - fast.
3	2	"Poker Face"	14 June 2018
Westminster lobby hack Sam Peakes has just written her best political story yet. But in journalism, what you write isn't always what people read.
4	3	"Plane Sailing"	21 June 2018
After missing her flight home, and her chance to get a political interview on the flight, Sam has to resort to the in-flight magazine for a scoop.
5	4	"Summer in the City"	28 June 2018
Sam needs a story and Mia needs something to fill the void left by Glastonbury Festival. Can a political festival help both of them?

=== Series two ===
A number of cast changes were made between the two series with only Higson and Lloyd remaining as part of the main cast. The series was recorded in front of a live audience. Production of the second series was carried out by Naked Productions for BBC Radio 4.

No. overall	No. in season	Title	Original release date
6	1	"Vis-a-Vis"	19 July 2019
Sam misses out on a scoop when a dull press event turns viral, just when Hot Takes is taken over.
7	2	"Risky Business"	26 July 2019
As Boris enters Number 10 and Britain melts in a heat-wave, the Hot Takes journalists follow the only reasonable course of action - hole up at home and turn off the news. Can the peace last?
8	3	"Brecon Bad"	2 August 2019
Sam heads to Wales to cover the fallout from the Brecon and Radnorshire by-election, giving Mia the worst birthday of her life.
9	4	"Sideways Moves"	9 August 2019
Tom Shriver MP decides the time is right to reap the benefits of a cash-in memoir, and Sam wants a piece of the action. But is there more to their relationship than meets the eye?
10	5	"Cometh the Power"	16 August 2019
Sam and Mia have been nominated for journalism awards at the prestigious DONCASTAs. But has Sam got a bigger decision to make?
