= Secret Service (British TV series) =

British espionage television series

- Genre: Spy; Thriller; Drama
- Based on: Secret Service by Tom Bradby
- Screenplay by: Tom Bradby; Jemma Kennedy
- Directed by: James Marsh; Farren Blackburn
- Starring: Gemma Arterton; Rafe Spall; Mark Stanley; Alex Kingston; Roger Allam; Avi Nash; Amaka Okafor; Khalid Abdalla
- Country of origin: United Kingdom
- Original language: English
- No. of series: 1
- No. of episodes: 5

Production
- Executive producers: Gail Egan; Andrea Calderwood
- Production companies: Potboiler Productions; All3Media

Original release
- Network: ITVX
- Release: 27 April – 5 May 2026

Secret Service is a British espionage television series commissioned by ITVX and premiered on 27 April 2026 on ITV1 and ITVX. It is an adaptation of the novel of the same name by Tom Bradby.

== Premise ==
When an MI6 intelligence agent uncovers a Russian plot to infiltrate the British Cabinet before a leadership election, senior SIS officer Kate Henderson leads the investigation. When the Prime Minister announces his sudden resignation, the Home Secretary Imogen Conrad and the Foreign Secretary Ryan Walker emerge as the contenders to succeed him.

Kate and her team find deep financial and compromising links between both political factions to Russia. Amid political backstabbing, leaked videos, and the killing of her colleague Rav, Kate races to expose a high-level conspiracy within the government before one of the candidates becomes PM.

== Cast ==
- Gemma Arterton as Kate Henderson, an MI6 officer and head of the Russia Desk
- Rafe Spall as Stuart Henderson, Kate's husband and a special adviser to Conrad
- Alexander Terentyev as Sergei Malinski, an SVR operative, old friend and informant of Kate, codename "Cyclops"
- Roger Allam as Sir Alan Brabazon, the Chief of MI6, codename "C"
- Avi Nash as Ravindra "Rav" Sangvhi, an MI6 Russia Desk officer working for Kate
- Mark Stanley as the Rt Hon Ryan Walker MP, the Foreign Secretary aligned with the centre-right wing of the Labour Party
- Alex Kingston as Rose Trewen, the Head of Security for MI6
- Amaka Okafor as the Rt Hon Imogen Conrad MP, the Home Secretary aligned with the left wing of the Labour Party
- Khalid Abdalla as Zak Hussein, the Deputy Chief of MI6 and Kate's superior
- Aoife Hinds as Julie Price, an MI6 Russia Desk officer working for Kate
- Rochenda Sandall as Melissa Morris, a special adviser to Walker
- Lydia Leonard as Amanda Walker, an auctioneer and Ryan's wife
- Steven Elder as the Rt Hon Anthony Fletcher MP, the Prime Minister and Leader of the Labour Party
- Alma Prelec as Lena Savic, an MI6 asset and nanny employed by Mikhail Borodin, codename "Echo"
- Galaxie Clear as Fiona Henderson, Kate and Stuart's teenage daughter
- Harley Barton as Gus Henderson, Kate and Stuart's son
- Juris Zagars as Lev Amatov, a British–Russian oligarch and political donor
- Michael Tcherepashenets as Mikhail Borodin, Igor's son and Lena's employer
- Petar Zekavica
- Miglen Mirtchev as Igor Borodin, the Director of the SVR
- Samuel Anderson as Harry Conrad, husband of Imogen Conrad
- Ben Lloyd-Hughes as Joshua Long
- Ed Balls as himself (cameo role)
- Susanna Reid as herself (cameo role)
- Robert Peston as himself (cameo role)
- Oleg Levin as Kyril Markov

== Episodes ==
No.	Title	Directed by	Written by	Original release date
1	"Episode 1"	James Marsh	Tom Bradby & Jemma Kennedy	27 April 2026
MI6 officer Kate Henderson meets in Malta with Lena, an asset providing intel on Russian SVR chief Igor Borodin, whose family she works for as a nanny. Lena plants a bugged cigar box in the Borodin villa. MI6 eavesdrop on Borodin speaking with operative Kyril Markov, who says they have an asset ready to replace a member of the British Cabinet who is dying of pancreatic cancer. Zak Hussein, Kate's superior, is cautious of Russia feeding false intel and gives her 48 hours to conclude the operation. During dinner with Home Secretary Imogen Conrad, for whom Kate's husband, Stuart, works as a special adviser, Prime Minister Anthony Fletcher announces his resignation owing to a terminal prognosis. Conrad and Foreign Secretary Ryan Walker become main contenders in an expedited leadership election. Kate discovers Conrad received an undeclared donation of £200k from Russian oligarch Lev Amatov. In a meeting with Zak, Kate and "C", Alan Brabazon, Anthony demands concrete evidence before authorising investigations into any MPs.
2	"Episode 2"	Unknown	Unknown	27 April 2026
Kate's colleague Rav discovers Walker met Lev, the Russian Foreign Minister, and Swiss investment lawyer Laurent Sauverre in Lisbon shortly after Anthony's announcement. The two start working off books to investigate both him and Conrad. "C" orders Kate to check that Sergei Malinski, her university friend and mole in the SVR, remains onside. He assures her of his loyalty and advises the SVR has flagged Malta. Kyril deduces Lena is a mole and informs Igor. Kate suspects Lena is compromised, but Zak and head of security Rose Trewen refuse to authorise an extraction. Kate plans to extract Lena herself against orders, risking her job. Growing disillusioned with his behaviour, Walker's special adviser Melissa Morris leaks the Lisbon meeting details to the press, but Walker is able to save face in an impromptu interview with Robert Peston. Knowing her husband works for Conrad, Walker questions Kate's impartiality, and warns her not to interfere in the democratic process. Kyril forces Lena to arrange a meeting with Kate.
3	"Episode 3"	Unknown	Unknown	27 April 2026
Kate, Rav and fellow MI6 officer Julie Price try to extract Lena from Valletta, but she is killed by a sniper working for Kyril. Kate and Rav discover Kyril’s team travelled at short notice, suggesting a tip-off from someone in London who knew of the extraction plan. During her debrief, Zak discovers Kate has been investigating Conrad and Walker, and is forced to notify him. Walker faces marriage and financial issues. Melissa resigns, and tells Conrad that Walker may leak a video of her having an extramarital affair if he gets desperate. Kate speaks to former special adviser Josh Long, who denies an affair with Conrad at a conference in Montenegro, and claims he left politics owing to her closeness with Lev there. Kate also discovers Kyril was at the same conference. Rav discovers Zak also attended the Montenegro conference in secret, and the two begin to suspect he is working with Conrad and Kyril. However, "C" informs Kate that she and Rav have been suspended on Walker's orders owing to Lena's death.
4	"Episode 4"	Unknown	Unknown	27 April 2026
Kate and Sergei plan for him to break into SVR Headquarters and obtain hard-copy documents to uncover the identity of Igor's MI6 mole and asset. Walker causes further controversy after sharing a deep fake video, attributed to Lev's companies, about small boat migrants attacking teenage girls, which causes disorder in Lincolnshire and Hartlepool. Conrad and several Cabinet ministers host a conference demanding his resignation. When an SVR agent stalks her daughter, Kate is forced to tell her children she works for MI6. Rose confirms to Kate that Zak didn't log his Montenegro visit, only a flight to Dubrovnik in neighbouring Croatia. When Rose pressures Zak, he immediately calls Julie, whom Kate had sent to monitor Igor's closeted son Mikhail in Helsinki. Rose tells Kate that Zak and Julie may be working together. In Geneva, Rav covertly hacks Laurent's laptop and sends Kate evidence Walker received payments from Igor via a Swiss bank account. Kate then finds Rav murdered in his house.
5	"Episode 5"	Unknown	Unknown	27 April 2026
Despite proof Russia funded a building project Walker was invested in, Anthony refuses to suspend him, believing it shows only greed, not espionage. Frustrated, "C" approves Kate's mission with Sergei. The affair video of Conrad is released, but conceals the man's identity. Walker borrows a further million from Lev to protect his investment, with the oligarch remarking he backed the right man. Conrad loses the election to Walker. In Helsinki, Julie reveals Zak was tricked into attending Montenegro by Kyril. Mikhail gives Kate the date Igor's operation started in exchange for witness protection from his father. The paperwork Sergei then steals from the SVR places Igor in Prague before the operation commenced, the same time Kate and Stuart were there for their anniversary. Kate deduces Stuart is the mole, having been recruited by Igor who blackmailed him with footage of his affair with Conrad. She reluctantly allows him to defect across the Finland–Russia border as an alternative to being tried for treason. Walker, now Prime Minister, declares he was elected to serve the public despite interference from the deep state. After Rav's funeral, Zak and "C" have Kate seconded to the Cabinet Office to monitor Walker, who they still believe is a Russian asset.

== Production ==
The five-part series was commissioned by ITVX in May 2024, with Tom Bradby and Jemma Kennedy adapting Bradby's novel of the same name. Executive producers include Gail Egan and Andrea Calderwood. The series is produced by Potboiler Productions in association with All3Media International. Stan acquired rights in Australia in February 2025. James Marsh is director on the first three episodes, with Farren Blackburn directing episodes four and five. The cast is led by Gemma Arterton, and includes Rafe Spall, Mark Stanley, Alex Kingston, Amaka Okafor, Khalid Abdalla, Avi Nash and Roger Allam.

Filming began in late March 2025 with filming locations including Malta and London.

== Broadcast ==
The series premiered on 27 April 2026 on ITV1 and ITVX. ITV presenters Ed Balls and Susanna Reid make cameo appearances as themselves in episode two of the series.
