= Rosie Graham =

Scottish actress (born 1999)

Rosie Graham (born 29 December 1999) is a Scottish actress. On television, she is known for her roles in the ITV period drama Sanditon (2022) and the BBC Three series Boarders (2024–2026).

== Early life ==
Graham grew up in a council flat in Maryhill, Glasgow. Her mother worked as a library assistant. From the age of 6, she took classes at the Citizens Theatre. Graham attended Hillhead High School. She studied performance at Glasgow Clyde College and went on to graduate from the Royal Conservatoire of Scotland.

== Career ==
Graham made her television debut in a 2020 episode of the Starz series Outlander. She also appeared on stage in Whatever Happened to the Jaggy Nettles? at the Citizens Theatre.

In 2022, Graham joined the cast of the ITV adaptation of Jane Austen's Sanditon for its second series as Alison Heywood. She made her feature film debut as Millicent in The School for Good and Evil on Netflix and her London stage debut as Princess Rose in the musical Hex at the National Theatre. She also starred in Goldilocks Goes to Greece at Òran Mór in Glasgow.

Graham next portrayed young Calder in a 2023 episode of the crime drama and featured in a Scots language adaptation of The Snow Queen at the Royal Lyceum Theatre in Edinburgh.

In 2024, Graham began playing Florence in the BBC Three teen comedy-drama Boarders. She played George in the Beatles-inspired play There's a Place at Perth Theatre. She returned to Òran Mór for It's a Wonderful Life... Mostly and Outskirts in 2025 and 2026 respectively.

== Filmography ==
=== Film ===
Year	Title	Role	Notes
2018	Guarding	Chloe	Short film
2022	The School for Good and Evil	Millicent	Netflix film
2024	End of Infinity	Charlotte	Short film

=== Television ===
Year	Title	Role	Notes
2020	Outlander	Morna Cameron	Episode: "Better to Marry Than Burn"
2022	Sanditon	Alison Heywood	6 episodes (series 2)
2023	Shetland	Young Calder	1 episode
2024–2026	Boarders	Florence	17 episodes

== Stage ==
Year	Title	Role	Notes
2020	Whatever Happened to the Jaggy Nettles?	Tammy "Baby" Walker	Citizens Theatre, London
2022	Goldilocks Goes to Greece	Goldilocks	Òran Mór, Glasgow
2022	Hex	Princess Rose	National Theatre, London
2023	The Snow Queen	Gerda	Royal Lyceum Theatre, Edinburgh
2024	There's a Place	George	Perth Theatre, Perth
2025	It's a Wonderful Life... Mostly	Various	Òran Mór, Glasgow
2026	Outskirts	Dove	Òran Mór, Glasgow
