= Hourglass (Goddard novel) =

Novel by Keiran Goddard

- Author: Keiran Goddard
- Publication date: March 3, 2022
- ISBN: 9781408714874

Hourglass is the debut novel by British writer Keiran Goddard. It was published in the UK by Hachette, Little, Brown and by E/O in Italy and the United States, the novel was listed for the Desmond Elliott Prize, and praised by The Guardian, The Financial Times, The New Statesman and The Irish Times. The sequel, I See Buildings Fall Like Lightning, will be published internationally in 2023.
