= Crazy Gary's Mobile Disco =

Crazy Gary's Mobile Disco is a play by Gary Owen that was first presented by Paines Plough and Sgript Cymru in Cardiff, Wales, in 2001, after which it won the first Theatre in Wales Award for Best New Play. The play is set on a Thursday night in a small town in Wales and focuses on three young men in their mid-twenties burdened by their school reputations of the gimp, the geek and the bully. The play takes the format of three monologues and the tagline for the play is "their dream is to get the hell out".

The script was published by Bloomsbury in 2001, who republished it 2005 in a collection of Owen's plays.

== Dramatis personae ==
- Gary: a hate-fuelled arsehole who dobs enemies into Crimewatch for fun.
- Matthew D Melody: charismatically naïve and thinks Frank Sinatra can save the world.
- Russell Markham: imploding from a life full of repressed anger, which is causing everything from impotence to fear of cancer.

== Selected productions ==
- 2001 – Premiere at Chapter Arts Centre, Cardiff, followed by performances at the Lyric Studio, London, and a tour of English theatres.
- 2003 – Staatsschauspiel Dresden, Germany, in a German translation by Peter Torberg
- 2006 – Inis Nua theater, Philadelphia, USA
- 2011 – Tron Theatre, Glasgow, and Traverse Theatre, Edinburgh
- 2014 – Chapter Arts Centre, Cardiff, followed by a tour of other theatres in Wales
