= Boarders =

British TV series (2024–2026)

- Genre: Teen drama; Comedy-drama
- Created by: Daniel Lawrence Taylor
- Country of origin: United Kingdom
- Original language: English
- No. of series: 3
- No. of episodes: 18

Production
- Executive producers: Daniel Lawrence Taylor; Susan Hogg; Maddie Sinclair; Ayela Butt; Nawfal Faizullah
- Production companies: Studio Lambert; All3Media International

Original release
- Network: BBC Three
- Release: 20 February 2024 – 29 March 2026

Boarders is a British teen comedy-drama television series created by Daniel Lawrence Taylor, centred around the lives of five young black teens who earn scholarships into the prestigious boarding school of St. Gilbert's. The series is developed by Studio Lambert in association with All3Media International for BBC Three. The first series premiered on 20 February 2024. The second series was released on 3 February 2025. The third and final series premiered on 15 March 2026.

== Cast and characters ==
=== Main ===
- Josh Tedeku as Jaheim Marsham
- Jodie Campbell as Leah Dulverton
- Myles Kamwendo as Omar Palmer-Grace
- Aruna Jalloh as Femi Adebayo
- Sekou Diaby as Toby Staithes

=== Students ===
- Harry Gilby as Rupert (series 1–2)
- Tallulah Greive as Beatrix
- Rosie Graham as Florence
- Georgina Sadler as Mabel
- Assa Kanouté as Abby
- Archie Fisher as Cheddar
- Zheng Xi Yong as Xiang
- Maxim Ays as Felix
- Andrew Harmon-Gray as Graham
- Dillon Mitra as Dilton (series 1–2)
- Ruxandra Porojnicu as Yelena
- Niyi Akin as Koku (series 1)
- Philip Bayntun as Spencer (series 1)
- Kendra Brown as Devon'ye (series 2–3)
- Louis Thresher as Masked Raisinette/Jonny (series 2–3)
- Nagaieh Dad as Yusef (series 2–3)
- Kenyah Sandy as Benjamin (series 3)
- Daisy Jacob as Pixie (series 3)

=== Faculty and mentors ===
- Daniel Lawrence Taylor as Gus
- Derek Riddell as Bernard (series 1)
- Nimisha Odedra as Preeya (series 1)
- Sarah Daykin as Chelsea (series 1)
- Al Foran as Stanley
- William Andrews as Mackers
- Yuriri Naka as Ms Kaneko
- Emily Houghton as Mrs Goodlow (series 1)
- Amy Brown as Ms Harper (series 1–2)
- Cara Theobold as Jude (series 2)

=== Other ===
- Niky Wardley as Carol Watlington-Geese, Rupert's mother
- Mohammed Mansaray as Malachi (series 1–2)
- Kye Malcolm as Caleb (series 1)
- Llewella Gideon as Sylvia (series 1–2)
- Wunmi Mosaku as Grace (series 2) Jaheim's mother
- Rufus Jones as George Tramley (series 3), Cheddar's father and an MP
- Patrick Baladi as Alfie Watlington-Geese (series 3), Carol's ex
- Fatiha El-Ghorri as Mrs El-Fassi (series 3)

=== Guest ===
- Natalie Cassidy as Sharon Hail
- Alan Cumming as Alan
- Unknown T as himself

== Production ==
=== Development ===
In August 2022, it was announced BBC Three had commissioned a six-part series titled Boarders from Daniel Lawrence Taylor and Studio Lambert. In addition to Lawrence Taylor, the series would be executive produced by Susan Hogg and Maddie Sinclair for Studio Lambert, and Ayela Butt and Gaynor Holmes for the BBC. Joining him in the writers room were Emma Dennis-Edwards, Yemi Oyefuwa, and Ryan Calais Cameron. Lawrence Taylor has said that, while fictional, the series was inspired by a real-life article about underprivileged black teens on a scholarship scheme, and influenced by his own experience at a "predominately white and middle class" university.

A second series was announced on 4 June 2024 via the BBC's official media channels. It was confirmed the main cast would reprise their roles. In July 2024, Tubi officially boarded the project as a co-producer for its second series due to the "incredible response" to series 1.

In February 2025, Lawrence Taylor confirmed writing for series 3 was underway.

=== Casting ===
In July 2023, it was announced Josh Tedeku, Jodie Campbell, and Myles Kamwendo would star in the series alongside Sekou Diaby and Aruna Jalloh. Creator Daniel Lawrence Taylor would appear in the series as a mentor. Also joining the cast were Derek Riddell, Niky Wardley, Harry Gilby, Tallulah Greive, Rosie Graham, Georgina Sadler and Assa Kanoute.

In October 2024, the BBC and Tubi announced Wunmi Mosaku had joined the cast of Boarders for its second series, as well as Cara Theobold, Michael Salami, and Kendra Brown. In January 2025, it was revealed Alan Cumming and Natalie Cassidy would make guest appearances in the forthcoming series.

=== Filming ===
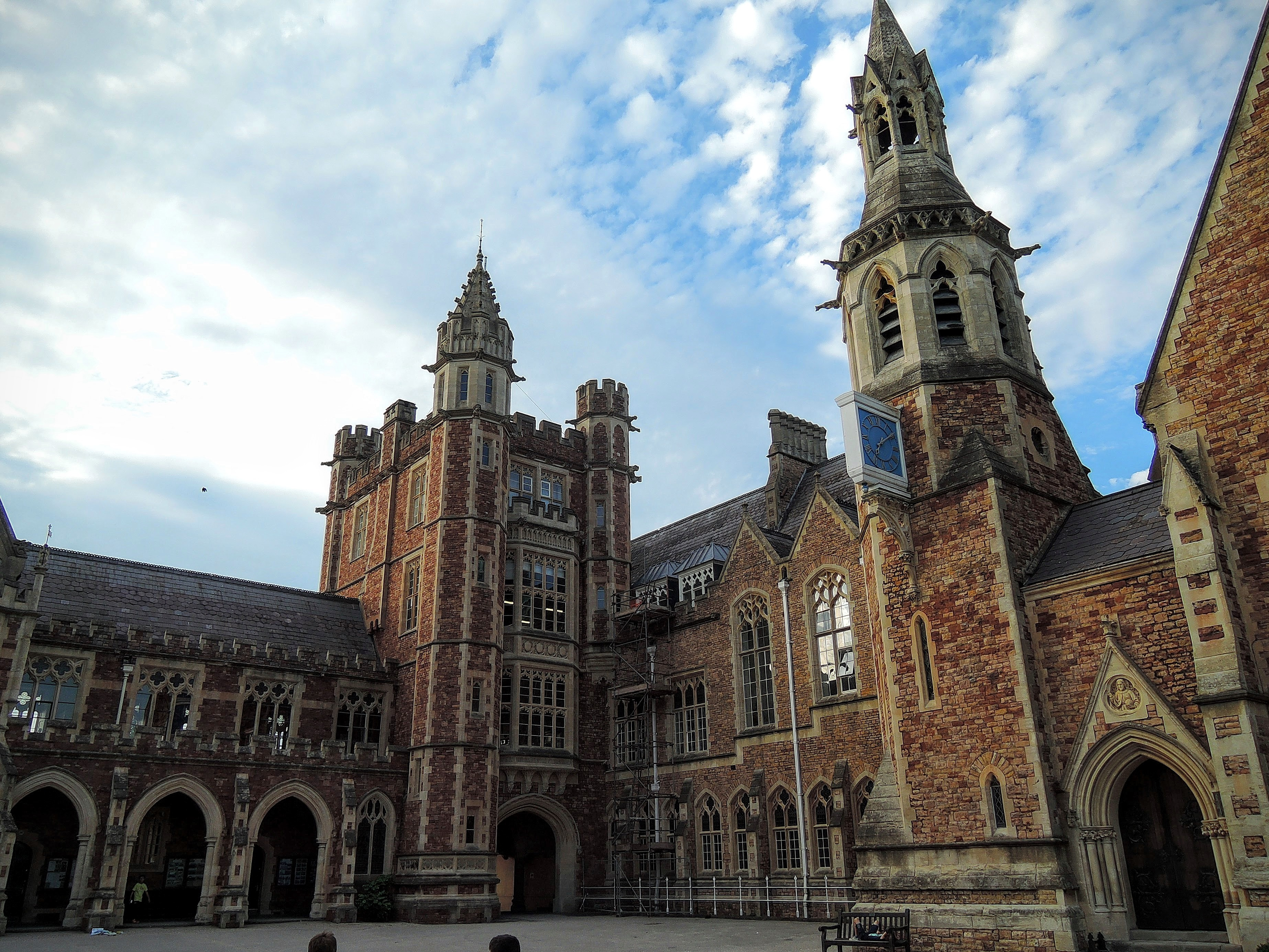
Clifton College

Principal photography took place in Bristol. Clifton College served as the fictional St Gilbert's in the series. Other filming locations included Ashton Court and Redcliffe.

== Episodes ==
Series	Episodes	Originally released	
Series	Episodes	First released	Last released
1	6	20 February 2024	19 March 2024
2	6	3 February 2025	17 February 2025
3	6	15 March 2026	29 March 2026

=== Series 1 (2024) ===
No.	Directed by	Written by	Original release date
1	Ethosheia Hylton	Daniel Lawrence Taylor	20 February 2024
It’s move-in day and the 5 new black students are there. As they’re getting to know everyone, it is clear there will be a bit of racism and classing coming of age school antics. Femi joins in with the Rah’scals and they run through campus naked to the bell tower.
2	Ethosheia Hylton	Daniel Lawrence Taylor	27 February 2024
Toby joins in a Japanese class. The students go to a party held in the school crypt, Toby is the DJ. Rupert tries to fight Jaheim, but Jaheim’s friends almost light him on fire, jokingly with water instead of petrol. Leah snogs Koku and vomits on him because she drank too much.
3	Ethosheia Hylton	Emma Dennis-Edwards	5 March 2024
It’s diversity Day at St. Gilbert’s school. Omar gets a sealed envelope while in the bathroom. Femi’s roommate, Xiang, is convinced his friends have stolen his laptop that he needs back for the BotBattle happening later that day. The bot battle takes place and the rival school, Caldwell College, likely cheats during the tournament when a power outage occurs.
4	Sarmad Masud	Ryan Calais Cameron	12 March 2024
It’s exeat weekend, so many of the students leave school. Omar gets his next initiation letter. Toby has to pay back Yelena for the fake drugs by Monday. Jaheim hates his friends now. Abby struggles with whether to have sex with Koku or not.
5	Sarmad Masud	Yemi Oyefuwa	19 March 2024
6	Sarmad Masud	Daniel Lawrence Taylor	19 March 2024

=== Series 2 (2025) ===
No.	Directed by	Written by	Original release date
1	Joelle Mae David	Daniel Lawrence Taylor	3 February 2025
2	Joelle Mae David	Yemi Oyefuwa	3 February 2025
3	Joelle Mae David	Daniel Lawrence Taylor, Jeffrey Aidoo	10 February 2025
4	Sarmad Masud	Daniel Lawrence Taylor, Racheal Ofori	10 February 2025
5	Sarmad Masud	Daniel Lawrence Taylor, Yemi Oyefuwa	17 February 2025
6	Sarmad Masud	Daniel Lawrence Taylor	17 February 2025

=== Series 3 (2026) ===
No.	Directed by	Written by	Original release date
1	Yero Timi-Biu	Daniel Lawrence Taylor	15 March 2026
2	Yero Timi-Biu	Daniel Lawrence Taylor, Cherish Shirley	15 March 2026
3	Yero Timi-Biu	Temi Wilkey	22 March 2026
4	Satya Bhabha	Alex Straker	22 March 2026
5	Satya Bhabha	Emma Dennis-Edwards	29 March 2026
6	Satya Bhabha	Daniel Lawrence Taylor, Yemi Oyefuwa	29 March 2026

== Reception ==
=== Critical response ===
The first series of Boarders received positive reviews from critics. Rotten Tomatoes reported an approval rating of 100% based on 8 reviews. Leila Latif of The Guardian gave Boarders four out of five stars and called it "packed with future megastars" in line with the Skins ensemble, singling out Campbell, Diaby, Tedeku, and Kanoute's performances in particular. Louisa Mellor for Den of Geek recommended the series to Sex Education fans. The Daily Telegraph's Poppie Platt also gave the series four stars, calling it "razor-sharp". Morgan Cormack of Radio Times commended how Boarders balances serious, heavy topics and moments of learning with comedy and fun.

=== Awards and nominations ===
Year	Award	Category	Nominee	Result	Ref.
2024	Edinburgh Television Festival	Best Comedy Series	Boarders	Nominated	
2024	Venice TV Awards	Best Comedy	Boarders	Nominated	
2024	Music + Sound Awards	Best Sync in a Television Programme	Carmen Montanez Callan, Mykaell S. Riley, Sarmad Masud	Nominated	
2024	C21 International Drama Awards	Best Comedy-Drama Series	Boarders	Nominated	
2025	Broadcast Awards	Best Comedy Programme	Boarders	Nominated	
2025	Royal Television Society Programme Awards	Comedy Drama	Boarders	Nominated	
2025	Royal Television Society Programme Awards	Breakthrough Award	Josh Tedeku	Won	
2025	RTS West of England Awards	Scripted	Boarders	Won	
2025	Edinburgh Television Festival	Breakthrough Performance	Sekou Diaby	Nominated	
2026	Broadcast Awards	Best Comedy Drama Programme	Boarders	Nominated	
2026	NAACP Image Awards	Outstanding Breakthrough Creative (Television)	Daniel Lawrence Taylor	Nominated	
