= British Academy Television Craft Award for Best Scripted Casting =

Award for technical achievements in TV

British Academy Television Craft Award
- Country: United Kingdom
- Presented by: British Academy of Film and Television Arts
- First award: 2020
- Currently held by: Nathan Toth & Julie Harkin for Reunion (2026)
- Website: http://www.bafta.org/

The British Academy Television Craft Award for Best Scripted Casting is one of the categories presented by the British Academy of Film and Television Arts (BAFTA) within the British Academy Television Craft Awards, the craft awards were established in 2000 with their own, separate ceremony as a way to spotlight technical achievements, without being overshadowed by the main production categories.

First awarded in 2020, according to the BAFTA website, the category is "designed to recognise excellence in casting on scripted work."

== Winners and nominees ==
=== 2020s ===
Year	Title	Recipient(s)	Broadcaster
2020	Top Boy	Des Hamilton	Netflix
2020	Chernobyl	Nina Gold, Robert Sterne	Sky Atlantic
2020	Sex Education	Lauren Evans	Netflix
2020	Giri/Haji	Yoko Narahashi, Shaheen Baig, Layla Merrick-Wolf	BBC Two
2021	Small Axe	Gary Davy	BBC One
2021	Baghdad Central	Kate Rhodes James	Channel 4
2021	Sex Education	Lauren Evans	Netflix
2021	The Third Day	Shaheen Baig	Sky Atlantic
2022	We Are Lady Parts	Aisha Bywaters	Channel 4
2022	Time	Beverly Keogh, David Martin	BBC One
2022	It's a Sin	Andy Pryor	Channel 4
2022	Sex Education	Lauren Evans	Netflix
2023	This Is Going to Hurt	Nina Gold, Martin Ware	BBC One
2023	Bad Sisters	Nina Gold, Lucy Amos	Apple TV+
2023	Am I Being Unreasonable?	Julia Harkin	BBC One
2023	Top Boy	Des Hamilton, Elan Jones	Netflix
2024	Three Little Birds	Aisha Bywaters	ITVX
2024	Time	Amy Hubbard	BBC One
2024	Smothered	Amy Hubbard, Shannon Dowling-McNulty	Sky Max
2024	Black Mirror: "Demon 79"	Jina Jay	Netflix
2025	Supacell	Isabella Odoffin	Netflix
2025	Mr Bates vs The Post Office	Jill Trevellick	ITV1
2025	Rivals	Kelly Valentine Hendry	Disney+
2025	Lost Boys and Fairies	Lauren Evans	BBC One
2026	Reunion	Nathan Toth, Julie Harkin	BBC One
2026	Adolescence	Shaheen Baig	Netflix
2026	Get Millie Black	Shaheen Baig	Channel 4
2026	What It Feels Like for a Girl	Nathan Toth	BBC Three

== See also ==
- Primetime Emmy Award for Outstanding Casting for a Comedy Series
- Primetime Emmy Award for Outstanding Casting for a Drama Series
- Primetime Emmy Award for Outstanding Casting for a Limited Series, Movie, or Special
