= Keiran Goddard =

British novelist, poet and critic

- Education: Exeter College, Oxford
- Occupations: Novelist; Poet; Literary critic
- Writing career
- Language: English
- Notable works: Hourglass; I See Buildings Fall Like Lightning; For the Chorus; Votive
- Website: www.keirangoddard.com

Keiran Goddard is a novelist, poet and critic from Shard End, Birmingham. He is the author of the novels Hourglass, longlisted for the 2022 Desmond Elliott Prize, and I See Buildings Fall Like Lightning, longlisted for the 2025 Gordon Burn Prize. He has also published the poetry collections For the Chorus and Votive.

I See Buildings Fall Like Lightning was adapted for film by director Clio Barnard from a screenplay by Enda Walsh. Goddard also writes as a critic for The Guardian and The Observer.

== Novels ==
His debut novel, Hourglass, was nominated for the Desmond Elliott Prize. The novel was praised by Nina Renata Aron in The Los Angeles Times and received a more critical review from Alyssa Songsiridej in the Toronto Star.

Goddard's second novel is I See Buildings Fall Like Lightning. In a review for The Guardian, Barney Norris called it "a multivocal narrative focusing on a working-class community in Birmingham." Kirkus Reviews praised the book's "extraordinary writing", but noted "[the five narrators] seem uncommonly reflective and articulate, even when drunk or stoned or suicidal." The novel was published internationally and nominated for the Gordon Burn Prize.

It is also being adapted for film by Enda Walsh and Clio Barnard for BBC Film. It will star Daryl McCormack, Joe Cole, Lola Petticrew, Anthony Boyle, Jay Lycurgo, Millie Brady and Lucie Shorthouse.

== Other writing ==
Goddard writes regularly for The Guardian and The Observer.
