= Timewasters =

UK television comedy

- Genre: Science-fiction; Comedy; Satire
- Created by: Daniel Lawrence Taylor
- Written by: Daniel Lawrence Taylor; Barunka O'Shaughnessy
- Directed by: George Kane
- Starring: Adelayo Adedayo; Daniel Lawrence Taylor; Kadiff Kirwan; Samson Kayo
- Country of origin: United Kingdom
- Original language: English
- No. of series: 2
- No. of episodes: 12

Production
- Camera setup: Single-camera
- Production company: Big Talk Productions

Original release
- Network: ITV2
- Release: 9 October 2017 – 8 April 2019

Timewasters is a British science-fiction comedy (Note: At a Royal Television Society London panel discussion in 2019, British Film Institute lead programmer and event chair Justin Johnson opened by stating that Timewasters "successfully combined a science fiction premise with a period setting [and] a full-on comedy.") television programme, first broadcast on ITV2 in 2017 with a second series broadcast in 2019. It was created by Daniel Lawrence Taylor and written by Taylor and Barunka O'Shaughnessy. It was produced for ITV Studios by Kenton Allen and Matthew Justice of Big Talk Productions. The episodes were directed by George Kane. The programme stars Taylor, Adelayo Adedayo, Samson Kayo and Kadiff Kirwan as the members of an unsuccessful all-black South London jazz quartet who time-travel to the 1920s, and later the 1950s, visiting the Jazz Age and post-war cool jazz period while experiencing culture clashes as they manoeuvre in the unfamiliar eras.

Critical response to the programme was generally favourable, with praise for its originality in addressing racism through the comedic insertion of modernity into a period setting. It is also known for satirizing historical dramas and their lack of diversity. There was critical praise for the writing, direction, chemistry of the main cast, and music. Taylor won the Breakthrough Award at the 2018 Royal Television Society Programme Awards, and the programme was nominated for Best Scripted Comedy at the 2018 British Academy Television Awards.

== Cast ==
Main cast (the jazz quartet): (Note: Taylor named the four main characters after his four siblings.)

- Daniel Lawrence Taylor as Nick Wolton, trumpet and bandleader;
- Kadiff Kirwan as Jason, saxophone;
- Adelayo Adedayo as Lauren Wolton, drums;
- Samson Kayo as Horace Cunningham, trombone and vocals. Kayo also portrays Horace's grandfather Aston in the series 2 premiere.

Recurring:

- John Stoate as Homeless Pete, operator of the time machine;
- Kevin 'KG' Garry as Curtis;
- Joseph Quinn as Ralph;
- Liz Kingsman as Victoria (series 1);
- Anna Chancellor as Victoria (series 2);
- Frankie Wilson as Terry, leader of a group of Teddy Boys;
- Kristy J Curtis as Rita, a Teddy Girl in Terry's group;
- Theo Barklem-Biggs as Len White, a club owner;
- Ellie White as Janice, a Russian spy;
- Oliver Wellington as JJ, Jason and Victoria's son;
- Clint Dyer as General Hands, a grifting jazz musician;
- Sam Douglas as Vadim, a Russian spy;
- Daniel Simonsen as Alexei, a Russian spy.

Guests:

- Kevin Eldon as Professor John Logie Baird;
- Nigel Havers as Dr Braithwaite, a eugenicist;
- Nigel Planer as Albert Langley, Victoria's butler;
- Sophie McShera as Rose Bickerton, Lauren's superfan;
- Amy Beth Hayes as Nicola, Nick's romantic interest;
- Danielle Vitalis as Myrtle, Horace's grandmother;
- Daniel Rigby as Martin, an alternate-reality version of Horace;
- Tom Bennett as Ronnie Scott, a jazz musician and club owner;
- Javone Prince as Pastor Gabriel;
- Patrick Baladi as Jonty Ripperton Clack, a conservative politician;
- Maple Briscoe as Time Travelling Girl.

== Episodes ==
All episodes were directed by George Kane. Episodes were written by Taylor and Barunka O'Shaughnessy, with episode 4 of series 2 co-written by Claire Downes, Ian Jarvis and Stuart Lane.

=== Series 1 (2017) ===
No. overall	No. in series	Original release date
1	1	9 October 2017
A struggling jazz quartet step into a time machine (Note: The time machine is operated by the mysterious Homeless Pete and is in the form of a lift (elevator) – a squalid one in a block of flats in 2017 and 2019, a bespoke panelled one in 1926, and later a derelict lift in a bomb-site ruin in 1958.) and find themselves stranded in 1926. Although they are mistaken for cannibals and reinforce the stereotype that black people are thieves, they are hired to perform at the birthday party of socialite twins Ralph and Victoria. While the others enjoy the perks as guests of the wealthy elite, bandleader Nick tries to get the time machine working and is nearly waterboarded as a spy. He rejoins the band in time for their performance, rebranding themselves as the Wu-Tang Clan. Meanwhile, the time machine activates and brings Curtis, who had sworn a vendetta against Jason, to 1926.
2	2	9 October 2017
Nick obsesses over time travel and is sent to a racial-stereotyping therapist who is intrigued by his intellect. Nick spends a week at a retreat where he is prepared for an overseas eugenics breeding program. Meanwhile, Ralph becomes fascinated with Lauren, attempts to propose marriage, and joins the French Foreign Legion when he learns of her revulsion toward him. Jason becomes a model and tries to get into the eugenics program. Lauren and Horace exfiltrate Nick, while Curtis follows them and is forcibly taken in Nick's place.
3	3	16 October 2017
Lauren tires of being treated like a performing seal by Victoria and her "rich bitch" friends, but reverses her attitude and joins them after an impulsive bet raises her fortunes. Nick tries to help abused butler Langley by revealing his talent for operatic singing, which results in Langley being fired and left destitute. Horace seamlessly fills the butler role, while Jason tries to look less attractive. Lauren falls from the rich-bitch circle when she can no longer match their frivolous spending. Nick continues to encourage a suicidal Langley to follow his dreams, and Langley is inspired to develop a successful headlining act by wearing blackface.
4	4	23 October 2017
The quartet gains a regular booking at a gentlemen's club but Lauren receives half-wages as a woman and is required to perform from behind a curtain. Despite this, Lauren attracts a superfan, Rose Bickerton, who packs the club's audience with cross-dressing women. They encourage Lauren to show herself and break down the gender barriers, and Lauren becomes a celebrity. Manipulated by Rose, Lauren systematically replaces the other band members whom she believes are plotting against her. However, Rose then takes leadership of the all-white band and uses their music and identity to book major concert venues that were beyond the reach of the black musicians. Meanwhile, Horace explores a series of ventures to exploit the band's branding, including golliwog dolls.
5	5	30 October 2017
Victoria invites the quartet to her family's country estate, where Horace hosts a murder mystery game. Jason pursues Victoria in a game of hide-and-seek, but soon finds that he is being hunted by Curtis. Jason tries to flee and begs for his life when confronted by Curtis, who collapses while coughing blood. Lauren, delayed due to her fear of nature, arrives to help Jason and encourages him to hide Curtis's body. They return to the murder mystery but Jason's guilty conscience causes him to repeatedly confess. He takes the others to the scene of the crime but Curtis's body is missing, and tensions rise higher as Victoria plays along with the murder mystery and then eliminates a pest. They find that Curtis is seriously ill and prepare to return to London.
6	6	6 November 2017
Nick spots Homeless Pete at the time machine and realizes that it is working. Despite Curtis's urgent medical requirements, they decide to have one last day in the 1920s, with Victoria throwing them a party. Jason tries to properly end his relationship with Victoria and can't understand her easy acceptance. Nick decides that there was no grand purpose to their adventure and abandons his earlier caution. Lauren hires prostitute Nicola to sleep with Nick, but Nicola is taken by his kindness and marries him. While Lauren tries to convince Nick to come home, her attempt to get rich by bringing antiques to the future is ruined. When the truth comes out at the time machine, Nick rejects Nicola and leaves her behind. However, the time machine takes them to an unfamiliar destination and Horace implies that they are in the distant past amongst dinosaurs.

=== Series 2 (2019) ===
No. overall	No. in series	Original release date
7	1	11 March 2019
In 2019, the quartet reunites for a sombre performance at the funeral of Horace's grandmother Myrtle. Overcome with grief, Horace decides to use the time machine to warn her. The others follow but find that Homeless Pete has taken them all to 1958 (instead of "two minutes to eight" pm). Nick becomes overexcited at seeing jazz musicians and chases after them, getting into an altercation with a gang of Teddy Boys. Myrtle happens along, is pushed down, and suddenly defended by Len White, owner of the Blue Flamingo jazz club. As chemistry builds between Myrtle and Len, Horace begins to fade and eventually transforms into a three-quarters white man named Martin. Martin flees from violent Lauren and the quartet enters into another confrontation with the Teddy Boys, in which Myrtle is again knocked down. This time Myrtle is aided by Aston, Horace's grandfather. Myrtle immediately forgets about Len and Horace violently emerges from Martin, just as The One Ton Clam are called to the stage to perform. Jason reunites with Victoria, now in her fifties, and they all decide to stay in the era of cool jazz, unaware that they are being watched by the mysterious Janice.
8	2	11 March 2019
The gang stays with Victoria, whose finances are greatly reduced. Lauren covers their rent from working security at Len's cabaret club. The Blue Flamingo changes to a rock and roll venue, so Nick revives a wartime jazz club in a Nissen hut in Victoria's garden. When Len rejects Lauren's idea to offer full stripping and lap dances, Lauren brings the concept and dancers to Nick's club. Nick is initially outraged until he sees the line of customers gathered, and they bring in a considerable sum on their opening night. Horace organizes the dancers and proposes a cooperative, which attracts the rest of Len's dancers. However, Nick's idol, General Hands, takes one look at the club and walks away, declaring that he doesn't perform in titty bars. Although Lauren gains council approval for expansions, Nick calls Len to take his dancers back. Meanwhile, Jason becomes concerned that Victoria may have other lovers of his type and build, and very slowly comes to understand that her son JJ (Jason Junior) is also his son. Janice infiltrates Nick's club as a cleaning woman and is ordered to retrieve Horace's smartphone.
9	3	18 March 2019
Victoria throws a debutante ball to find a wife for JJ. Jason tries to bond with his son (who is five years older than him) and encourages JJ to sleep around. JJ accepts Lauren's sexual proposition but her conscience stops her due to Jason's serious objections. But when Lauren realizes that Jason thinks she isn't good enough for JJ, she sleeps with JJ to spite Jason. Paranoid about spy stories in the newspapers, Nick gathers all their belongings from the future to burn. Horace is trying to ask Janice to the ball when she learns about the fire and runs to Nick. Nick mistakes her for a groupie, leaving Horace feeling rejected. Janice saves Horace's diary from the fire, but as Janice reads it and understands his feelings, she abandons her mission.
10	4	25 March 2019
Jason purchases a book on parenting advice and a copy of Time Bender, an unauthorized publication of Horace's diary. It becomes a science fiction bestseller and creates a sensation over the mystery of its author's identity. Lauren encourages Horace to reveal himself so they can both make money. He appears on a television arts show, which Janice observes as she has been relegated to logging television programmes. Meanwhile, Nick discourages a saxophonist from starting a jazz club due to his own difficulties, and realizes that he may have interfered with the establishment of Ronnie Scott's Jazz Club. Things become worse when celebrity Horace demonstrates UK garage music which becomes a sensation. Lauren pressures Horace to write a sequel, and Horace comes out as a time traveller but is disbelieved and dismissed. Ronnie starts the jazz club but won't let the quartet perform due to Horace's notoriety. Janice escapes her minders, Alexei and Vadim, who see Horace's admission and are convinced that time travellers are real.
11	5	1 April 2019
Victoria is away for a funeral and Jason worries that he's become fat. General Hands returns, secretly on the run from his creditors. When he thinks Horace suspects his motives, Hands accuses Horace of attacking him with voodoo and Nick has Horace leave to appease his idol. Horace wanders into a church and confesses his trouble at being accused of having bad juju, and undergoes a baptism. Hands steals Lauren's money (which she skimmed from Horace) and fluffs Jason's ego, eventually taking boudoir photographs of Jason to sell to men's skin magazines. Janice finds Horace and tries to warn him but Lauren pulls Horace away to get their money back, leaving Janice to be captured by Russian spies who were surveilling Horace. Jealous of Jason, Nick shoots his own skin pictures for Hands, who calls him creepy and leaves, refusing to perform at Nick's club.
12	6	8 April 2019
Janice escapes to thwart the Soviet spies. Victoria returns, engaged to the widower, rich MP Jonty. JJ leaves Lauren for fatally neglecting his pet. The gang is evicted, Nick's club is closed, and Horace has run away. Jonty advocates the deportation of West Indian immigrants and Nick inadvertently invites them to "his lawn" (actually Jonty's garden) where a shantytown forms. Horace joins the Teddy Boys, donning a pompadour wig. Vadim fears directly confronting the "highly intellectual" time travellers so he orders the spies to follow Janice to the time machine. The Teddy Boys confront the squatters; Nick and Horace reconcile as they attempt to defuse the situation, but the Notting Hill race riots erupt. Janice warns Horace that she must destroy the time machine before the Soviet spies can change history. JJ believes Lauren redeemed herself by helping the immigrants but then discovers she bought houses from frightened owners. Jason gives JJ his cheap digital watch. The Russians get to the time machine first and Janice detonates a bomb; she survives and embraces Horace. The gang fears that they're stranded until a girl on roller shoes speeds by, suggesting that she also has a time machine.

== Production ==
=== Writing and development ===
The programme was created by Taylor, who began working on it in 2015. He recalled that "I wanted to write a comedy for young black actors and I saw that shows such as The Inbetweeners, Drifters and Plebs were doing well." Taylor was learning to play the trumpet, (Note: Taylor had been performing as half of the comedy duo Ginger and Black, in which his partner could play numerous instruments while he couldn't play any.) and this interest led him to write about a black jazz band in the 1920s. While acting on post-apocalyptic romantic-comedy Cockroaches, Taylor decided to use a high concept and added time travel. He wrote a spec script with the working title Black to the Future, (Note: The working title Black to the Future was changed following objections from Universal Pictures, which owns the rights to Back to the Future. This film was referenced in the series 2 premiere, in which three of the quartet say they'd never seen it.) which was later changed to Blackwards and then Timewasters. Although racial themes run throughout the programme, Taylor has said that it is "first and foremost ... a comedy."

Timewasters is Taylor's first project writing for scripted television. He worked with an editor provided by Big Talk Productions, who was producing Cockroaches for ITV, and improved his script over a few drafts. According to Taylor, the programme came at a time when there were "discussion[s] about putting more black talent on screen". His spec script drew interest from ITV, which commissioned a rehearsal reading. Casting was made through auditions; though the main cast hadn't worked together before, they had a quick chemistry and studio executives thought they were longtime friends. Taylor then worked with Barunka O'Shaughnessy; through a series of drafts they improved the humour and pacing of his stories for the first series.

=== Filming ===
The programme was shot in Liverpool, taking advantage of the Georgian architecture in the city including period buildings the Liverpool Athenaeum and Martins Bank Building. Series director George Kane used a cinematic look for the high-concept sitcom. Modern-day scenes used fixed-camera shots, hard surfaces, fluorescent lights and colour schemes that wouldn't appear in earlier periods. For the past, he used handheld cameras to give a sense of unpredictability. The 1920s scenes had a cohesive colour palette for props and wardrobe, while the 1950s scenes emulated the vivid Technicolor movies of that time.

=== Music ===
Nick Foster and Oli Julian composed the original music for the programme and arranged the jazzy covers of modern songs. The cast took lessons to act like they could play their instruments but do not perform any music in the series.

Foster posted the Timewasters Season One Original Soundtrack on his SoundCloud account. Cover songs include "Hey Ya!", "Return of the Mack", and "Back to Black". Songs in series 2 include "This Is How We Do It" (episode 1), "Flowers (In the Pouring Rain)" (episode 2), "Brown Sugar" and "My Angel Lover" (episode 3), "Do You Really Like It?" (episode 4), and "No Letting Go" (episode 5).

== Themes ==
Central themes in the series are race and injustices based on race, gender, and social status. Taylor stated in an interview that "racism is ridiculous" and enjoyed mining it for humour. He set the first series in the 1920s to provide distance which made it less awkward to address racial issues.

Jimi Famuewa wrote for the Evening Standard that Timewasters challenged the way in which black characters are portrayed in period dramas. Kate Holman of the Royal Television Society (RTS) wrote that the programme "challenges the traditional period drama" and expertly draws comedy from the juxtaposition of past and present prejudices. Also for RTS, Matthew Bell compared Timewasters to Derry Girls and Home for finding humour in dark subject matter. Ed Gove noted the rarity of an all-black central cast on British TV; he summed up the programme's attitude toward race with a joke from the pilot: "People like us never get to time travel – it's what white people do, like skiing or brunch."

== Release and reception ==
=== Broadcast and ratings ===
The programme premiered on 9 October 2017 on ITV2. The second series was first broadcast 11 March to 8 April 2019 on ITV2. The first series was the most-viewed digital-channel comedy in 2017 for the 16–24 demographic in the UK.

The programme had its North American premiere streaming on CBC Gem in May 2020, with the second series available in September 2020. It premiered in the US on Amazon streaming service IMDb TV on 11 June 2021.

=== Critical response ===
Joel Keller of Decider recommended the programme, finding it to have unexpected humour in the way it treats racism "head on without taking itself ... seriously". Homa Khaleeli wrote for The Guardian that Timewasters challenges the archetypes and lack of diversity in period dramas. Cheryl Eddy of Gizmodo described the series as a sharply satirical comedy that expertly draws humour from racism. She praised the writing, the music, and the chemistry between the four lead actors. Melody McCune of Geek Girl Authority wrote that the series "deftly and brilliantly doles out social commentary" of systemic racism in life and in media. She praised the writing, the chemistry of the leads, and the music.

Angelica Guarino of Common Sense Media thoroughly enjoyed the programme, calling it "harmoniously ambitious, off-beat, and fast paced," with uniform story arcs. She particularly praised Taylor's performance and encouraged parents to discuss with their children the racial issues raised and how it can be "empowering to make jokes about serious topics".

Noah Berlatsky of NBC News wrote that the "wonderful comedy ... subvert[s] heroic white narratives" of genre productions: using "hypervisible" outsider underdog characters who eschew expectations as their endeavours backfire; while broadly mocking the white characters who believe themselves special. Agathe Devionot of Just Focus felt that the series was a perfectly realized comedy, with the modernity of the main characters colliding with the social codes of the 1920s. Devionot praised the "comic genius" of the main cast and the collaboration between writer and director.

=== Nominations and awards ===
The programme was recognized at several national awards ceremonies. Taylor won the Breakthrough Award at the 2018 RTS Programme Awards. The series was nominated for Best Scripted Comedy at the 2018 British Academy Television Awards and Taylor and O'Shaughnessy were nominated for Best Comedy Writing on Television at the 2018 British Screenwriters' Awards.

Year	Ceremony	Category	Nominee or recipient	Result	Ref
2018	RTS Programme Awards	Breakthrough Award	Daniel Lawrence Taylor	Won	
2018	British Academy Television Awards	Best Scripted Comedy	Timewasters series 1	Nominated	
2018	British Screenwriters' Awards	Best Comedy Writing on Television	Daniel Lawrence Taylor and Barunka O'Shaughnessy	Nominated	
2018	Edinburgh International Television Festival	Best Breakthrough Talent	Daniel Lawrence Taylor	Nominated	
2019	Broadcast Digital Awards	Best Comedy Programme	Timewasters series 2	Shortlisted	
2019	RTS North West Awards	Best Comedy Programme	Timewasters series 2	Won	
2019	RTS North West Awards	Best Performance in a Comedy	Samson Kayo	Won	
2019	RTS North West Awards	Best Performance in a Comedy	Daniel Lawrence Taylor	Nominated	

== Planned US remake ==
In 2019, Taylor stated that he was in talks with LL Cool J as a potential producer for a US remake of the series for CBS. In early 2021, it was announced that a US remake of Timewasters was in development at ABC, under showrunner Lauren Ashley Smith with Lawrence Taylor, Kenton Allen and Matthew Justice (Big Talk Productions) also executive producing. The remake would be set in New York City and explore the Harlem Renaissance while contrasting the black experience of 2021 with that of 1926. The untitled project was being developed for ABC through CBS Studios. It was reported that a pilot was scheduled to be filmed in early 2021, following COVID-19 delays. However, a lack of press releases or reportage after August 2021 suggests that it did not go into production.

== See also ==
- History of jazz
