= Why Didn't They Ask Evans? (2022 TV series) =

- Genre: Mystery
- Created by: Hugh Laurie
- Based on: Why Didn't They Ask Evans? by Agatha Christie
- Written by: Hugh Laurie
- Directed by: Hugh Laurie
- Starring: Will Poulter; Lucy Boynton; Maeve Dermody; Hugh Laurie; Jim Broadbent; Emma Thompson
- Composers: Claire Freeman; Ed Marquis
- Country of origin: United Kingdom
- Original language: English
- No. of episodes: 3

Production
- Executive producers: Emily Powers; Gina Cronk; Jonathan Karas; Damien Timmer; Helen Ziegler; James Prichard; Hugh Laurie
- Editors: Ian Farr; Belinda Cottrell
- Camera setup: Ben Butler
- Running time: 58 minutes (3-part); 44 minutes (4-part)
- Production companies: Agatha Christie Productions; Mammoth Screen

Original release
- Network: BritBox
- Release: 9 April – 12 April 2022

Why Didn't They Ask Evans? is a British mystery miniseries adaptation of Agatha Christie's detective fiction novel of the same name, published in the United Kingdom and United States in 1934 and 1935, respectively. The series was produced and broadcast by BritBox on 9-12 April 2022.

== Cast ==
- Will Poulter as Bobby Jones
- Lucy Boynton as Frankie Derwent
- Maeve Dermody as Moira Nicholson
- Hugh Laurie as Dr James Nicholson
- Jim Broadbent as Lord Marcham
- Emma Thompson as Lady Marcham
- Conleth Hill as Dr Alwyn Thomas
- Daniel Ings as Roger Bassington-ffrench
- Jonathan Jules as Ralph 'Knocker' Beadon
- Miles Jupp as Henry Bassington-ffrench
- Amy Nuttall as Sylvia Bassington-ffrench
- Alistair Petrie as Reverend Richard Jones
- Paul Whitehouse as the landlord
- Morwenna Banks as Mrs Cayman
- Joshua James as Dr George Arbuthnot
- Richard Dixon as Leo Cayman

== Production ==
In April 2021, it was announced that Hugh Laurie would be adapting the novel for BritBox in 2022. The filming took place in Surrey, mainly in the villages of Shere and Albury, between June and August 2021, and at Three Cliffs Bay in Swansea. The three-part series became available on BritBox on 14 April 2022. It was then shown on ITVX and ITV in April 2023.
