= Daniel Lawrence Taylor =

British actor and comedy writer

- Born: May 1983 (age 43); South London
- Education: Royal Holloway, University of London
- Occupations: Actor; screenwriter

Daniel Lawrence Taylor (born May 1983) is a British actor, comedy writer, and producer.

== Early life and education ==
Taylor grew up in South London. He studied drama and theatre studies at Royal Holloway, University of London, graduating with a Bachelor of Arts (BA) in 2004.

== Career ==
He appeared in several sitcoms including Uncle, How Not to Live Your Life, and Hunderby. He starred in ITV2's 2015 comedy Cockroaches and had a small role in The Inbetweeners. He is one half of the comedy duo Ginger & Black (with Eri Jackson). He appeared in series 2 of Lobby Land, a BBC Radio 4 political satire broadcast.

Taylor created, wrote and starred in the ITV2 sitcom Timewasters. The first series of Timewasters aired in 2017 and the second series aired in spring 2019. Series 1 was nominated for a BAFTA in 2018 for Best Scripted Comedy. In 2018, Taylor was named as a BAFTA Breakthrough Brit. He serves as showrunner, head writer and has a supporting role on the BBC Three comedy-drama series Boarders which was broadcast in 2024.

== Personal life ==
Taylor resides in London and is based in the Forest Hill area. He has two daughters with his wife Tess.

== Awards and nominations ==
Year	Award	Category	Nominated work(s)	Result	Ref
2018	Royal Television Society Programme Awards	Breakthrough Award	Timewasters	Won	
2018	BAFTA Television Award	Best Scripted Comedy	Timewasters	Nominated	
2018	BAFTA Breakthrough Brits		Body of work	Won	
2025	RTS West of England Awards	Scripted	Boarders	Won	
2025	Royal Television Society Programme Awards	Comedy Drama	Boarders	Nominated	
