= Galaxie Clear =

British actress

- Born: Hackney, London, England
- Education: Manchester School of Acting
- Occupation: Actress
- Years active: 2026–present

Galaxie Clear is a British actress. She was named a 2026 Screen International Star of Tomorrow.

== Early life ==
Clear was born in Hackney, London, but moved to Manchester in 2018. She took weekend acting classes at Manchester School of Acting.

== Career ==
Clear made her film debut portraying Minna in coming-of-age drama Extra Geography, which premiered at 2026 Sundance Film Festival. She was cast in the role following her first audition experience. Leading the cast alongside Marin Duggan, the pair were described by The Times as "uncommonly good" and able to "carry the movie with unfussy authenticity and a wry sense of irony" and as "commanding performances" a “real triumph" by Empire. For their performance, Clear and Duggan were nominated for Best Joint Lead Performance at the British Independent Film Awards, with Clear also nominated for Breakthrough Performance.

On television that year, she could be seen in ITV espionage drama Secret Service alongside Gemma Arterton. That year, she was cast as Pandora alongside Oliver Savell in a BBC adaptation of the Sue Townsend 1982 novel The Secret Diary of Adrian Mole, Aged 13¾. She was named a 2026 Screen International Star of Tomorrow.

== Filmography ==
Key
†	Denotes works that have not yet been released

Year	Title	Role	Notes
2026	Extra Geography	Minna	
2026	Secret Service	Fiona Henderson	
TBA	The Secret Diary of Adrian Mole, Aged 13¾†	Pandora	
