= Gary Owen (playwright) =

Welsh playwright (born 1972)

- Born: 1972 (age 53–54); Haverfordwest, Pembrokeshire, Wales
- Occupation: Playwright

Gary Owen (born 1972) is a Welsh playwright, and winner of the 2003 Meyer-Whitworth Award for new writing for the theatre.

== Career ==
Owen attended Cambridge University before he went into theatre. He was writer in residence at Paines Plough between 2001 and 2002, and was previously script editor at BBC Wales Drama (1998–2000). His plays have been performed around the United Kingdom from London to the Edinburgh Festival Fringe, and abroad as far as Canada, Australia and Germany – in which Crazy Gary's Mobile Disco was performed in German at Theater in Der Fabrik, Dresden in February 2003.

His 2010 play Mrs Reynolds and the Ruffian was a nominee for the 2010 TMA Awards best new play. The production of Iphigenia in Splott (2015) at Sherman Theatre, starring Sophie Melville was ranked by The Guardian writers as the 28th best theatre show since 2000. It was revived for another run in 2022, with Melville returning to her role. In 2026, it was the source for the Welsh-language film Effi o Blaenau, directed by Marc Evans, with Leisa Gwenllian in the role of Effi. His play Owain and Henry was the first production of the re-newed Welsh National Theatre company in 2026.

== Works ==
=== Theatre ===
- Crazy Gary's Mobile Disco (2001)
- Fags (2002)
- The Shadow of a Boy (2002)
- The Drowned World (2002)
- Amser Canser (2003) (in Welsh)
- The Low Hundreds (2003)
- Cold Harbour (2003)
- The Green (2003)
- Ghost City (2004)
- Hartleby, Oooglemore and Jeramee (2005)
- An Enemy for the People (2006)
- Mary Twice (2008)
- Amgen:Broken (2009)
- A Christmas Carol (2009)
- Mrs Reynolds and the Ruffian (2010)
- Love Steals Us from Loneliness (2010)
- Free Folk (2010)
- Blackthorn (2010)
- Perfect Match (2013)
- Pen-blwydd Poenus Pete (2014)
- Iphigenia in Splott (2015)
- Violence and Son (2015)
- Killology (2017)
- The Cherry Orchard (2017) (re-imagining)
- Romeo and Julie (2023)
- Iphigenia yn Sblott (2024) (Welsh adaptation)
- Owain & Henry (2026)

=== Other ===
- "Osskah" (short story, published in the Doctor Who collection Short Trips: Snapshots) 2007
