= Extra Geography =

2026 British comedy drama film by Molly Manners

- Theatrical release poster
- Directed by: Molly Manners
- Screenplay by: Miriam Battye
- Based on: "Extra Geography" by Rose Tremain
- Produced by: Sarah Brocklehurst
- Starring: Marni Duggan; Galaxie Clear; Alice Englert; Aoife Riddell
- Production companies: Brock Media; Film4; BFI
- Distributed by: Vertigo Releasing
- Release dates: January 2026 (Sundance); October 2, 2026 (United Kingdom)
- Running time: 94 minutes
- Country: United Kingdom
- Language: English

Extra Geography is a 2026 British comedy drama written by Miriam Battye and adapted from the 2007 short story of the same name by Rose Tremain. It is directed by Molly Manners with a cast led by Marni Duggan and Galaxie Clear as two best friends at a British boarding school.

== Plot ==
In 2003, Flic and Minna are 15-year-old best friends attending a girls' boarding school in the North of England. The two girls wonder what it will be like to fall in love when they are older. When it is announced that the school will be staging a production of A Midsummer Night's Dream, involving male cast members from a local school, they read the play and decide to audition.

Inspired by a scenario from the play, Flic and Minna determine that they will attempt to fall in love with the first person they see on entering the school canteen. Their geography teacher, Rosalind Delavigne, is selected, and the pair compete to become closer to her. They deposit rose petals on her doorstep, before running away and kissing each other on the cheek.

During an audition for the play, Minna forgets her lines and believes she has performed badly; nevertheless, she is selected for the major role of Titania, while Flic is cast as a tree. Flic begins to become jealous of Minna's role and her popularity among the boys who will participate in the play. Upset at being ignored and made fun of while the pair spends time with the boys, Flic injures the boy playing Bottom, and takes over the role herself when he drops out.

Flic continues her efforts to grow closer to the unassuming Rosalind, and impresses her with her research into New Zealand, Rosalind's native country. Both Flic and Minna hold hands with Rosalind when she cries on a school trip. However in an argument with Flic later on, Minna angrily dismisses the project to fall in love, telling Flic that she neither loves nor even likes Rosalind.

Flic persuades Rosalind to let her visit her cabin on the edge of the school grounds and view family photographs. Minna invites herself along. There, Flic attempts to kiss Rosalind, but Rosalind kisses Minna instead. Distraught, Rosalind ejects the pair from her cabin, and later resigns from the school.

The play goes ahead. Flic allows the boy portraying Demetrius to kiss her after the performance. After the summer break, the two girls reunite on the school fields, and Flic informs Minna they are no longer best friends.

== Cast ==
- Marni Duggan as Flic
- Galaxie Clear as Minna
- Alice Englert as Miss Delavigne
- Aoife Riddell as Phoebe

== Production ==
The film is adapted from the Rose Tremain short story of the same name, and is Molly Manners feature length directorial debut. It is adapted by Miriam Battye. The cast is led by Marni Duggan and Galaxie Clear and includes Alice Englert. It was filmed at Gilling Castle, a former boarding school in North Yorkshire. It is produced by Sarah Brocklehurst for Brock Media with funding from Film4 and the BFI.

== Release ==
In January 2026, the film had its world premiere at the Sundance Film Festival in the World Cinema Dramatic Competition. Vertigo Releasing released the film in the United Kingdom on 2 October 2026.

== Reception ==
On the review aggregator website Rotten Tomatoes, Extra Geography holds an approval rating of 100% from 33 reviews.

Writing for The Guardian, Adrian Horton gave the film four stars out of five and called it a "nuanced, delicate and at times excruciatingly accurate portrait of a friendship frayed by envy."
