= Faith (2026 film) =

2026 British drama film

- Teaser poster
- Directed by: Paul Andrew Williams
- Screenplay by: Paul Andrew Williams
- Produced by: Danny Page; Dominic Tighe
- Starring: Erin Doherty; James McAvoy; Liv Hill; Smylie Bradwell
- Cinematography: Simona Şuşnea
- Edited by: Nina Annan
- Music by: Raffertie & NYX
- Production companies: Giant Productions; Homefront Productions; Blazing Griffin; Miria Talent
- Distributed by: True Brit Entertainment
- Release date: 11 September 2026 (TIFF)
- Running time: 109 minutes
- Country: United Kingdom
- Language: English

Faith is a 2026 British supernatural drama film written and directed by Paul Andrew Williams and starring Erin Doherty and James McAvoy with Liv Hill. The film follows Gina, a devoted single mother, whose life changes after meeting a mysterious stranger Michael.

The film had its world premiere in Special Presentations at the 2026 Toronto International Film Festival on 11 September 2026.

== Summary ==
Gina is a single mother trying to manage work and raising her young son, Jamie. She works shifts at a nearby factory and does her best to create a warm home with the little she has. When she meets Michael, a kind and mysterious volunteer at the food bank, his gentle presence makes her feel hopeful in a way she hasn't allowed herself for a long time.

Then, suddenly, everything changes.

== Cast ==
- Erin Doherty as Gina
- James McAvoy as Michael
- Liv Hill
- Smylie Bradwell as Jamie
- Sandra Huggett as Council staff

== Production ==
The film, produced by Dominic Tighe of Giant Productions and Danny Page of Homefront Productions and Blazing Griffin, was shot in the United Kingdom in February 2026. The film was funded for £38,817 through Screen Scotland's Project Post Fund.

== Release ==
Faith had world premiere in Special Presentations at the 2026 Toronto International Film Festival on 11 September 2026.

It will be presented in the Freestyle section of the 21st Rome Film Festival in October 2026.

British based True Brit Entertainment acquired United Kingdom and Ireland rights to the film in February 2026 from United Kingdom's Bankside and France’s Logical Pictures. Erin Doherty was nominated for Best Lead Performance at the 2026 British Independent Film Awards.
