= Jonathan Jules =

British actor

- Occupation: Actor
- Years active: 2016-present

Jonathan Jules is a British film and television actor from Croydon. For his performance in Florid (2026), he was nominated for Best Lead Performance and Breakthrough Performance at the British Independent Film Awards.

He was named a 2026 Screen International Star of Tomorrow.

== Career ==
From Croydon, Jules had a role in Steve McQueen anthology series Small Axe (2020) appearing in the Alex Wheatle film opposite Sheyi Cole. The following year, he joined the cast of Agatha Christie drama series Why Didn't They Ask Evans? for BritBox. He appeared in Apple TV World War Two drama Masters of the Air as Lt. Shelby F. Westbrook (2024).

For his performance in the lead role of Jamal in British film Florid (2026), he was nominated for Best Lead Performance and Breakthrough Performance at the British Independent Film Awards. Jules was named a 2026 Screen International Star of Tomorrow.

== Partial filmography ==
| Year | Title | Role | Notes |
|---|---|---|---|
| 2019 | Fighting With My Family | Wrestler | |
| 2020 | Small Axe | Dennis | Episode: Alex Wheatle |
| 2022 | Why Didn't They Ask Evans? | Ralph 'Knocker' Beadon | 4 episodes |
| 2023 | My Mother's Wedding | Jones | |
| 2024 | Death in Paradise | Chayce Jones | 1 episode |
| 2024 | Masters of the Air | Lt. Shelby F. Westbrook | 1 episode |
| 2026 | Florid | Jamal | |
