= Florid (film) =

British drama film

- Directed by: Billy Lumby
- Screenplay by: Billy Lumby
- Produced by: Rupert Lloyd; Joy Gharoro-Akpojotor
- Starring: Jonathan Jules; Saskia Chana; Unknown T
- Cinematography: Adric Watson
- Edited by: Omar Guzman
- Music by: CJ Mirra
- Production companies: Atar Studios; Joi Productions
- Release date: September 25, 2026 (San Sebastian)
- Running time: 84 minutes
- Country: United Kingdom
- Language: English

Florid is a 2026 British drama film, written and directed by Billy Lumby in his feature film debut, and starring Jonathan Jules, Saskia Chana and Unknown T.

The film premiered at the 2026 San Sebastian Film Festival. Lumby and Jules were both nominated at the British Independent Film Awards.

== Premise ==
Set in London, a young man with musical ambitions also has mental health issues.

== Cast ==
- Jonathan Jules as Jamal
- Saskia Chana as Kyla
- Marlon Bravi
- Unknown T
- Louise ‘Lulu’ Parr
- Jennifer Greenidge

== Production ==
The film marks the feature debut for writer and director Billy Lumby, previously a BAFTA nominee for his short film Samuel-613, and who himself has a diagnoses of schizophrenia.

In preparation for the film, Lumby visited psychiatric wards in London, as well as shadowing social workers and visiting met people with mental health experiences, as well as their families and carers. Many of the roles in the film went to non-actors that Lumby had met during this process, including psychiatrists, social workers and people with diagnoses of bipolar and schizophrenia. The film ja produced by Atar Studios and Joi Productions, in co-production with Sweden’s Film i Väst and Filmgate.

The cast is led by Jonathan Jules as Jamal, a young man who hears voices. On set, During filming, Jules wore an earpiece, through which other actors spoke into and to which he could respond in an unrestricted way. Both Jules and fellow cast member Saskia Chana spent time within the NHS prior to performing. The cast also includes rapper Unknown T.

== Release ==
The film had its world premiere at the San Sebastian Film Festival as the closing film of the 2026 New Directors Lineup.

== Reception ==
The film was described as an "immersive, moving character study" by Screen Daily.

== Accolades ==
Jules was nominated for Best Lead Performance and Breakthrough Performance at the British Independent Film Awards with Lumby nominated for The Douglas Hickox Award for Best Debut Director.
