= Shaheen Baig =

British casting director

- Born: Shaheen Baig
- Occupation: Casting director
- Years active: 1995–present
- Website: shaheenbaigcasting.com

Shaheen Baig is a British casting director, who has cast for projects like Black Mirror, Peaky Blinders, A Thousand Blows, Adolescence, and Maya. She is also a member of BAFTA, the Academy of Motion Picture Arts and Sciences, the Casting Directors Guild, and the Casting Society of America. She won the 2025 Primetime Emmy in Outstanding Casting for a Limited or Anthology Series or Movie for Adolescence.

== Early life and education ==
Baig was born in Birmingham to a Pakistani father. She did not attend any university.

== Career ==
Baig started her career as a production assistant. She started an agency of her own in 2002. She has cast film and television projects with both emerging and established directors. Beyond her professional work, she is serving as a trustee for Open Door, co-founding the Casting Assistant Certificate course with the National Film & Television School, and mentoring young talent. In 2023, she received the Royal Television Society's prestigious Baird Medal for her contribution to television and representation in the West Midlands. She is also the co-founder of the National Film and Television School's Casting Assistant Certificate, where she trains her students to champion inclusive industry practices.

== Awards and nominations ==
Year	Award	Work	Category	Result	Ref.
2020	Royal Television Society	Girl/Haji	Casting Award	Nominated	
2020	British Academy of Film and Television Arts	Girl/Haji	Best Scripted Casting	Nominated	
2021	British Independent Film Awards	After Love	Best Casting	Nominated	
2021	British Independent Film Awards	Calm with Horses	Best Casting	Nominated	
2021	British Independent Film Awards	Calm with Horses	Best Casting	Nominated	
2021	British Independent Film Awards	Ali & Ava	Best Casting	Nominated	
2021	British Academy Television Craft Awards	The Third Day	Best Scripted Casting	Nominated	
2022	British Independent Film Awards	Blue Jean	Best Casting	Won	
2023	British Independent Film Awards	Scrapper	Best Casting	Nominated	
2023	Casting Directors' Guild Awards	Pirates	Best Casting in an Independent Film (shared with Jonny Boutwood)	Nominated	
2023	Casting Directors' Guild Awards	Ali & Ava	Best Casting in an Independent Film	Nominated	
2024	Casting Directors' Guild Awards	Blue Jean	Best Casting in an Independent Film	Nominated	
2024	Casting Directors' Guild Awards	Scrapper	Best Casting in an Independent Film	Nominated	
2024	Casting Directors' Guild Awards	Boiling Point	Best Casting in a TV Drama Series (shared with Jonny Boutwood)	Won	
2025	Primetime Emmy Awards	Adolescence	Outstanding Casting for a Limited or Anthology Series or Movie	Won	
