= Sekou Diaby =

English actor

- Diaby at the 2026 BFI London Film Festival
- Born: Sekou Mark Diaby
- Education: BRIT School
- Occupation: Actor
- Years active: 2023–present

Sekou Mark Diaby is an English actor. On television, he starred in the BBC Three series Boarders (2024–2026). His films include Animol (2026). He was named a 2026 Screen International Star of Tomorrow.

== Early life ==
Diaby is from South London and of mixed heritage. Diaby attended the BRIT School. He also joined the National Youth Dance Company.

== Career ==
Diaby made his television debut in 2024 when he began starring as Toby Staithes in the BBC Three teen comedy-drama Boarders. His performance received critical acclaim, and Diaby was nominated for Breakthrough Performance at the 2025 Edinburgh International Television Festival.

Also in 2025, Diaby made his feature film debut as Zach in the Amazon Prime film My Fault: London, starred in the music video for "Illegal" by PinkPantheress, and appeared in the BBC Three miniseries What It Feels Like for a Girl as Rinze. He next played Dion in the 2026 film Animol.

== Filmography ==
=== Film ===
Year	Title	Role	Notes
2023	When You're Moody	Ariff	Short film
2023	The Nightingale	Freddie	Short film
2025	My Fault: London	Zach	Amazon Prime film
2025	From Sidney, with Love	Nick	Short film
2026	Animol	Dion	

=== Television ===
Year	Title	Role	Notes
2024–2026	Boarders	Toby Staithes	Main role
2025	What It Feels Like for a Girl	Rinze	Miniseries, 2 episodes
TBA	Major Players	Kyron	
TBA	Code Zero	Cal	

=== Music video ===
Song	Year	Artist	Notes
"Illegal"	2025	PinkPantheress	

== Awards and nominations ==
Year	Award	Category	Work	Result	Ref.
2025	Edinburgh International Television Festival	Breakthrough Performance		Nominated	
