= Effi o Blaenau =

- Theatrical release poster
- Directed by: Marc Evans
- Screenplay by: Branwen Cennard
- Based on: Iphigenia in Splott by Gary Owen
- Produced by: Branwen Cennard
- Starring: Leisa Gwenllian; Tom Rhys Harries; Nel Rhys Lewis; Owen Alun; Carys Gwilym; Gavin Lee Lewis
- Cinematography: Eira Wyn Jones
- Edited by: Elen Pierce Lewis
- Music by: Ioana Selaru; Sion Trefor
- Production companies: Sianel 4 Cymru; S4C Rhyngwladol International; Creative Wales; Tarian Films
- Distributed by: MetFilm Distribution
- Release dates: 3 March 2026 (Glasgow); 19 June 2026 (United Kingdom)
- Country: Wales
- Language: Welsh

Effi o Blaenau is a 2026 Welsh drama film directed by Marc Evans from a screenplay by Branwen Cennard. It is an adaptation of the monodrama play Iphigenia in Splott by Gary Owen.

The film premiered at the Glasgow Film Festival on 3 March 2026, and was released in the United Kingdom on 19 June 2026.

== Plot ==
In the Welsh slate mining town of Blaenau Ffestiniog, Effi is a young woman desperate to escape her hometown. She spends her weekends partying in Llandudno with her friend Leanne and tenuous partner, Kev. One day whilst clubbing, she meets Lee, an amputee soldier who she spends the night with. After unsuccessfully attempting to pursue a relationship with Lee, Effi discovers she is pregnant.

She attempts to meet up with him, only to discover the phone number given to her was that of Lee's friend. The friend agrees to meet with Effi, where he reveals Lee has a wife; he slept with her to attempt to overcome his impotence following his injury.

In spite of this, Effi decides to keep the baby. On discovering she is pregnant, believing the child to be his own, Kev decides to sell his gaming equipment. Even after discovering he is not the father, Kev still offers support, such as giving Effi a pram.

One night, Effi begins to have contractions, leading her to visit A&E. When she arrives, a midwife informs her she will be having the baby prematurely. Due to a lack of sufficient equipment, she is told she will be taken to Aberystwyth to deliver her child. However, Effi gives birth in the ambulance to a still-born child.

Distressed by the loss of her "babi", she socially isolates herself in her Nan's house. On the instances she does leave, it is to visit a solicitor with Kev, hoping to get financial compensation. She is informed that because the midwife did not accompany her in the ambulance, she will likely win the case and thus, a large sum of money. When attending a postnatal appointment, Effi sees the same nurse who did not come in the ambulance with her. Effi tells of the money she is to win to the nurse, who replies that her financial gain will result in less funding to the maternity unit, and potentially more infant deaths. Effi decides to drop the case.

== Cast ==
- Leisa Gwenllian as Effi
- Tom Rhys Harries as Lee
- Nel Rhys Lewis as Leanne
- Owen Alun as Kev
- Carys Gwilym as Meg (Effi's Grandmother)
- Gavin Lee Lewis as Pete Desford

== Production ==
In January 2026, a Welsh-language Welsh drama film by filmmaker Marc Evans was selected to screen at the Glasgow Film Festival, adapted by Branwen Cennard from the monodrama play Iphigenia in Splott by Gary Owen. Leisa Gwenllian, Tom Rhys Harries, Nel Rhys Lewis, Owen Alun, Carys Gwilym and Gavin Lee Lewis rounded out the cast. The 2026 edition of the festival highlighted Gaelic and Welsh-language films, which included Effi o Blaenau.

The film had a production budget of £2.2 million, partly funded by Creative Wales and S4C.

== Release ==
Effi o Blaenau premiered at the Glasgow Film Festival on 3 March 2026, and was released with subtitles in the United Kingdom on 19 June 2026 to cinemas in England, Wales and Scotland.

Despite a limited opening on 30 screens, the film had the biggest opening weekend of any Welsh-language film, beating the previous record holder, Gwledd. It took £30,000 at the UK box office on its opening weekend, compared to Gwledd's £28,000, despite initially appearing on 47 fewer screens. By 3 August 2026 it had taken £215,000 across 125 venues in the UK and Ireland, a record for a Welsh-language film to that date.

== Reception ==
On the review aggregator website Rotten Tomatoes, 100% of 18 critics' reviews are positive, with an average rating of 8.3/10.
