= Leisa Gwenllian =

Welsh actress

- Education: Oxford School of Drama
- Years active: 2014–2015; 2021–present
- Mother: Beca Brown

Leisa Gwenllian is a Welsh actress. She starred in the Welsh-language film Effi o Blaenau (2026) and was named a 2026 Screen International Star of Tomorrow.

== Early life and education ==
Gwenllian was born and brought up in North Wales. Her mother is Beca Brown, a Plaid Cymru member of the Senedd. She credits eisteddfods with giving her opportunities to gain confidence at performing in public through competitions in recitation, monologues and choral singing. She studied at Canolfan Gerdd William Mathias in North Wales and later trained at the Oxford School of Drama, graduating in 2024. Her audition piece for the drama school was a monologue from Iphigenia in Splott.

== Career ==
Gwenllian had an early role in Rocket's Island, appearing as Bethany Summer from 2014 to 2015. She went on to appear in Welsh soap opera Rownd a Rownd, S4C drama Itopia, the film On the Sea (2025), the second series of the Wales-set mystery-drama series The Light in the Hall: Still Waters/Y Golau:Dŵr (2025), and as Kath Bevan in Sky Atlantic crime drama Under Salt Marsh alongside Kelly Reilly and Rafe Spall (2026). She has been a voice actor in several animation productions from Sain and other companies.

Gwenllian made her first film appearance with the part of Lois in the film On the Sea (2025), followed by the maid Clara in Madfabulous (2026). However, her first leading role was in Effi o Blaenau (2026). She received praise for her performance as Effi in this Welsh-language film adaptation directed by Marc Evans from Gary Owen's one-woman play Iphigenia in Splott. Her portrayal of Effi was described as "remarkable", portraying a young woman shaped by poverty and neglect in the dramatic post-industrial landscape of Blaenau Ffestiniog and North Wales. For her performance, she was nominated for Best Lead Performance and Breakthrough Performance at the British Independent Film Awards.

== Filmography ==
=== Film ===
Year	Title	Role	Notes
2025	On the Sea	Lois	
2025	Madfabulous	Clara	
2026	Effi o Blaenau	Effi	

=== Television ===
Year	Title	Role	Notes
2014–2015	Rocket's Island	Bethany Summer	Recurring role, 19 episodes
2021	Rownd a Rownd	Kylie Walsh	Series regular
2022–2024	Itopia	Lwsi Hunter	Series lead
2025	The Light in the Hall	Young Eve	
2025	Under Salt Marsh	Kath Bevan	
