= British Independent Film Award for Best Casting =

British film award

- Awarded for: Best Casting
- Country: United Kingdom
- Presented by: BIFA
- First award: 2017
- Currently held by: Kneecap – Carla Stronge (2024)
- Website: www.bifa.org.uk

The British Independent Film Award for Best Casting is an annual award given by the British Independent Film Awards (BIFA) to recognize the best casting in a British independent film. The award was first presented in the 2017 ceremony.

Prior to 2017, casting was included in the category Best Technical Achievement alongside different areas of crafts in film, this category was presented from 2001 to 2016.

== Winners and nominees ==
=== 2010s ===
Year	Film	Recipient(s)
2017 (20th)	The Death of Stalin	Sarah Crowe
2017 (20th)	Film Stars Don't Die in Liverpool	Debbie McWilliams
2017 (20th)	God's Own Country	Shaheen Baig and Layla Merrick-Wolf
2017 (20th)	Lady Macbeth	Shaheen Baig
2017 (20th)	Three Billboards Outside Ebbing, Missouri	Sarah Halley Finn
2018 (21st)	The Favourite	Dixie Chassay
2018 (21st)	American Animals	Avy Kaufman
2018 (21st)	Apostasy	Michelle Smith
2018 (21st)	Beast	Julie Harkin
2018 (21st)	Stan & Ollie	Andy Pryor
2019 (22nd)	The Personal History of David Copperfield	Sarah Crowe
2019 (22nd)	In Fabric	Shaheen Baig
2019 (22nd)	The Last Tree	Shaheen Baig and Aisha Bywaters
2019 (22nd)	Only You	Kahleen Crawford and Caroline Stewart
2019 (22nd)	Wild Rose	Kahleen Crawford

=== 2020s ===
Year	Film	Recipient(s)
2020 (23rd)	Rocks	Lucy Pardee
2020 (23rd)	Calm with Horses	Shaheen Baig
2020 (23rd)	His House	Carmen Cuba
2020 (23rd)	Limbo	Dan Jackson
2020 (23rd)	Saint Maud	Kharmel Cochrane
2021 (24th)	Boiling Point	Carolyn McLeod
2021 (24th)	After Love	Shaheen Baig
2021 (24th)	Ali & Ava	Shaheen Baig
2021 (24th)	Pirates	Shaheen Baig
2021 (24th)	Belfast	Lucy Bevan and Emily Brockmann
2022 (25th)	Blue Jean	Shaheen Baig
2022 (25th)	Aftersun	Lucy Pardee
2022 (25th)	Living	Kahleen Crawford
2022 (25th)	Our River... Our Sky	Leila Bertrand
2022 (25th)	The Silent Twins	Kharmel Cochrane
2023 (26th)	How to Have Sex	Isabella Odoffin
2023 (26th)	All of Us Strangers	Kahleen Crawford
2023 (26th)	Earth Mama	Salome Oggenfuss, Geraldine Barón and Abby Harri
2023 (26th)	Rye Lane	Kharmel Cochrane
2023 (26th)	Scrapper	Shaheen Baig
2024 (27th)	Kneecap	Carla Stronge
2024 (27th)	Bird	Lucy Pardee
2024 (27th)	Hoard	Heather Basten
2024 (27th)	Love Lies Bleeding	Mary Vernieu and Lindsay Graham Ahanonu
2024 (27th)	On Becoming a Guinea Fowl	Isabella Odoffin
