= Animol =

British drama film

- Theatrical release poster
- Directed by: Ashley Walters
- Written by: Nick Love
- Produced by: Joy Gharoro-Akpojotor; Tom Hawkins; Nick Love; Ashley Walters
- Starring: Tut Nyuot; Vladyslav Baliuk; Stephen Graham; Sharon Duncan-Brewster
- Cinematography: Tasha Back
- Edited by: Danielle Palmer
- Music by: Swindle
- Production companies: Sky Original; Joi Productions; Film4; Rogue State; SLNDA
- Distributed by: StudioCanal
- Release dates: 14 February 2026 (Berlinale); 30 October 2026 (United Kingdom)
- Running time: 93 minutes
- Country: United Kingdom
- Language: English

Animol is a 2026 British drama film directed by Ashley Walters in his feature length debut, and written by Nick Love. It stars Tut Nyuot, Vladyslav Baliuk, Stephen Graham and Sharon Duncan-Brewster.

The film had its world premiere at the Perspectives section of the 76th Berlin International Film Festival on 14 February 2026, where it won the FIPRESCI Prize for Best Film. It received positive reviews from critics.

== Cast ==
- Tut Nyuot as Troy
- Vladyslav Baliuk as Krystian
- Sekou Diaby as Dion
- Stephen Graham as Claypole
- Sharon Duncan-Brewster as Joy
- Ryan Dean as Mason

== Production ==
=== Development ===
The film was developed by Film4 in collaboration with Joi Productions. It is written by Nick Love and marks the feature length directorial of Ashley Walters. It was produced by Joy Gharoro-Akpojotor and Tom Hawkins in association with Walter’s production company SLNDA and Love’s company Rogue State.

=== Casting ===
The cast is led by Tut Nyuot and Vladyslav Baliuk, with Stephen Graham and Sharon Duncan-Brewster in supporting roles. The film is working with the Synergy Theatre Project and Intermission Youth Theatre, to give opportunities as supporting artists to those considered of potential risk of entering the criminal justice system.

=== Filming ===
Principal photography began in January 2025.

== Release ==
It premiered at the 76th Berlin International Film Festival. The film is scheduled to be released theatrically in the United Kingdom on 30 October 2026.

== Reception ==
=== Critical response ===
On the review aggregator website Rotten Tomatoes, 100% of 17 critics' reviews are positive, with an average rating of 7.4/10. Metacritic, which uses a weighted average, assigns the film a score of 68 out of 100, based on four critics, indicating "generally favorable" reviews.

=== Accolades ===
The film received seven nominations, including Best Debut Director Film for Walters and Breakthrough Producer for Tom Hawkins at the British Independent Film Awards.
