= If Books Could Kill =

Book critique podcast

- Language: English

Cast and voices
- Hosted by: Michael Hobbes; Peter Shamshiri

Production
- Length: 60 mins (approx)

Publication
- Original release: November 2, 2022
- Updates: Monthly

If Books Could Kill is a podcast hosted by Michael Hobbes and Peter Shamshiri, in which they critique bestselling nonfiction books of the late 20th and early 21st centuries. Books featured on the podcast have included Freakonomics by Steven D. Levitt and Stephen J. Dubner, Outliers by Malcolm Gladwell, and The End of History and the Last Man by Francis Fukuyama. First airing on November 2, 2022, the podcast has received largely positive reviews from critics.

== Summary ==
If Books Could Kill is hosted by Michael Hobbes and Peter Shamshiri. Hobbes is a journalist known for hosting You're Wrong About with Sarah Marshall (until 2021) and Maintenance Phase with Aubrey Gordon. Shamshiri is known for his hosting of the podcast 5-4, along with Rhiannon Hamam and Michael Liroff.

The show targets "airport books", popular nonfiction books often marketed as pop science or smart thinking that might be found in airport bookshops, which Hobbes describes as "the superspreader events of American stupidity". Each episode is dedicated to the discussion of a single book, along with the book's wider cultural influence. The hosts focus on flawed arguments, poor uses of data, factual errors, and the drawing of unsound conclusions or overgeneralizations. They often take a comic tone and will poke fun at the books and their authors.

== Episodes ==
No.	Book featured	Book author	Release date
1	Freakonomics	Steven D. Levitt and Stephen J. Dubner	November 2, 2022
2	Outliers	Malcolm Gladwell	November 10, 2022
3	Bobos in Paradise	David Brooks	November 17, 2022
4	The Game	Neil Strauss	December 1, 2022
5	The Population Bomb	Paul R. Ehrlich and Anne Howland Ehrlich	December 15, 2022
6	The Secret	Rhonda Byrne	January 12, 2023
7	Men Are From Mars, Women Are From Venus	John Gray	January 26, 2023
8	The End of History and the Last Man	Francis Fukuyama	February 9, 2023
9	The Clash of Civilizations	Samuel P. Huntington	February 28, 2023
10	The Coddling of the American Mind	Greg Lukianoff and Jonathan Haidt	March 9, 2023
11	Hillbilly Elegy	JD Vance	March 23, 2023
12	Rich Dad Poor Dad	Robert Kiyosaki	April 6, 2023
13	The 5 Love Languages	Gary Chapman	April 20, 2023
14	Nudge	Richard H. Thaler and Cass R. Sunstein	May 4, 2023
15	Nudge	Richard H. Thaler and Cass R. Sunstein	May 19, 2023
16	The World Is Flat	Thomas Friedman	June 1, 2023
17	Atomic Habits	James Clear	June 15, 2023
18	The Rules	Ellen Fein and Sherrie Schneider	June 29, 2023
19	Liberal Fascism	Jonah Goldberg	July 27, 2023
20	God and Man at Yale	William F. Buckley	September 7, 2023
21	The 4-Hour Workweek	Tim Ferriss	September 21, 2023
22	San Fransicko	Michael Shellenberger	October 19, 2023
23	The 48 Laws of Power	Robert Greene	November 2, 2023
24	The Subtle Art of Not Giving a Fuck	Mark Manson	November 21, 2023
25	The Identity Trap	Yascha Mounk	December 14, 2023
26	Trump: The Art of the Deal	Donald J. Trump and Tony Schwartz	January 11, 2024
27	The Better Angels of Our Nature (part 1)	Steven Pinker	February 22, 2024
28	Lean In	Sheryl Sandberg and Nell Scovell	March 14, 2024
29	The Better Angels of Our Nature (part 2)	Steven Pinker	April 11, 2024
30	Going Infinite: The Rise and Fall of a New Tycoon	Michael Lewis	May 2, 2024
31	The Origins of Woke	Richard Hanania	July 11, 2024
32	The Anxious Generation	Jonathan Haidt	August 8, 2024
33	Battle Hymn of the Tiger Mother	Amy Chua	September 24, 2024
34	Who Moved My Cheese?	Spencer Johnson	October 10, 2024
35	The End of Faith	Sam Harris	November 4, 2024
36	What's the Matter with Kansas?	Thomas Frank	December 6, 2024
37	You Are a Badass	Jen Sincero	January 23, 2025
38	Of Boys and Men	Richard Reeves	March 6, 2025
39	Act Like a Lady, Think Like a Man	Steve Harvey	March 28, 2025
40	Manhood: The Masculine Virtues America Needs	Josh Hawley	March 31, 2025
41	The Let Them Theory	Mel Robbins	April 23, 2025
42	In Covid's Wake	Stephen Macedo and Frances Lee	June 17, 2025
43	In Covid's Wake	Stephen Macedo and Frances Lee	June 19, 2025
44	Blink	Malcolm Gladwell	July 17, 2025
45	He's Just Not That into You	Greg Behrendt and Liz Tuccillo	July 31, 2025
46	Summer of Our Discontent	Thomas Chatterton Williams	September 11, 2025
47	How to Win Friends and Influence People	Dale Carnegie	October 2, 2025
48	Sapiens: A Brief History of Humankind	Yuval Noah Harari	November 20, 2025
49	Elon Musk	Walter Isaacson	December 9, 2025
50	Elon Musk	Walter Isaacson	December 18, 2025
51	The Millionaire Next Door	Thomas J. Stanley and William D. Danko	February 5, 2026
52	Bullshit Jobs	David Graeber	March 5, 2026
53	The 4-Hour Body (with Maintenance Phase)	Tim Ferriss	April 16, 2026
54	Grit: The Power of Passion and Perseverence	Angela Duckworth	April 30, 2026
55	Think and Grow Rich	Napoleon Hill	May 21, 2026
56	The Body Keeps the Score	Bessel van der Kolk	June 18, 2026
57	Three Cups of Tea	Greg Mortenson and David Oliver Relin	August 5, 2026
58	Surrounded by Idiots	Thomas Erikson	September 1, 2026
59	Why Men Love Bitches	Sherry Argov	October 5, 2026

== Reception ==
If Books Could Kill was listed by Vulture as one of the best podcasts of 2023, described by the website as a "cutting and ambitious criticism of the nexus linking publishing, media, and elite power". Jessie Gaynor praised the podcast in a review on Literary Hub. Fiona McCann in The Irish Times described the podcast as "smart, intellectually engaged, left-leaning American men indulging in deliciously catty takedowns of popular and problematic 'big ideas' books" in a positive review, commenting that "your average left-leaner will have a field day, even as they face their own gullibility." In The Times, James Marriott gave the podcast a 4/5 star review, describing the show as satisfying but commenting that "after more than half an hour the hosts’ tone gets a bit smug". Hannah Giorgis in The Atlantic reviewed the podcast positively and praised the show for "resist[ing] the impulse to be satisfied with reaching into libraries past just to point and laugh", and instead exploring how such books have shaped public opinion and what they reveal about the historical moment in which they were published.
