= You're Wrong About =

American pop culture podcast

- Genre: Feminist; history; human interest; culture
- Language: English

Cast and voices
- Hosted by: Sarah Marshall; Michael Hobbes (2018–2021)

Production
- Production: Michael Hobbes; Sarah Marshall
- Length: 60–90 minutes (approximate)

Publication
- No. of episodes: 211
- Original release: May 2, 2018
- Updates: Fortnightly

Related
- Website: yourewrongabout.com

You're Wrong About is an American history and pop culture podcast created by journalist Michael Hobbes and writer Sarah Marshall. It has been hosted by Marshall since its inception; Hobbes also hosted until 2021. Launched in May 2018, the show explores misunderstood media events by interrogating why and how the public got things wrong. Show topics have included events such as the Challenger disaster, the O. J. Simpson trial, and the murder of Kitty Genovese; and people such as Anna Nicole Smith, Yoko Ono, Tonya Harding, and Lorena Bobbitt. It was named one of the ten best podcasts by Time in 2019.

== About ==
Michael Hobbes is an American journalist and a former reporter for HuffPost. He is also the co-host of the podcast Maintenance Phase with Aubrey Gordon, as well as the podcast If Books Could Kill with Peter Shamshiri.

Sarah Marshall is an American writer whose work has appeared in BuzzFeed, The Believer, and The New Republic. She is known for an interest in the mischaracterization of women by the mainstream media best demonstrated in her 2014 long-form profile of Tonya Harding. The show began after Hobbes reached out to Marshall and proposed that they try to recreate their deep-dive research processes in audio format. The pair only met in person after recording the show remotely for the first five months.

During each episode, Hobbes and Marshall trade off on researching the show's topic, with one host taking on the research and analysis of a topic and the other coming to the discussion with little-to-no knowledge about the relevant details. Each episode begins with the less informed host sharing what they remember about the person or event in question. Together they then explore the topic in a generally chronological manner, discussing relevant public responses and dominant societal trends from the era, before debunking that response and the subsequent media coverage. Witty observations and pop-culture references are woven in throughout the discussion. The discussions include references to primary resources used during the research process along with and direct quotes from media coverage interviews with relevant players.

In March 2020, the podcast began a quarantine book club in response to COVID-19 lockdowns. The related episodes differ from the regular format as they focus on a single book with one host having read it and the other learning about it over the course of multiple episodes. Books covered include the satanic ritual abuse book Michelle Remembers, Jessica Simpson's autobiography Open Book, and Objection! by American lawyer and television personality Nancy Grace.

The podcast is a part-time effort for both hosts and relies on crowd-funding. The independent nature of the show is rooted in moral concerns about critiquing the media and potential constraints inherent to sponsorship.

In October 2021, it was announced that Hobbes was leaving the podcast and the show would continue with Marshall and guests.

== Reception ==
In 2019, You're Wrong About was named one of the ten best podcasts by Time. Writing for the Irish Times, Sarah Griffin praised the show's conversational tone noting how Hobbes and Marshall "handle incredibly dark subjects with a levity that never feels disrespectful." Rachel Syme compared Hobbes and Marshall as a modern-day Statler and Waldorf, claiming their show is a history podcast that "assumes the audience is capable of complex thought."

== Episodes ==
=== 2018 ===
No.	Title	Guests	Original release date
1	"The Satanic Panic"	–	May 2, 2018
The premier installment of You're Wrong About entails a discussion between Sarah Marshall and Michael Hobbes about the Satanic Panic, a widespread moral panic during the 1980s and 1990s, characterized by baseless allegations of ritualistic child abuse, fuelled by societal fears and media sensationalism. The panic began with accusations of child sexual abuse and outlandish claims, such as a teacher flying through the air. Police involvement led to widespread panic and dubious child testimonies, often shaped by leading questions from adults. Despite extensive investigations and media coverage, no evidence was found, and all accused were acquitted.
2	"Going Postal"	–	May 3, 2018
3	"Crack Babies"	–	May 4, 2018
4	"Afterschool Specials"	–	May 5, 2018
5	"Matthew Shepard"	Mike Owens	May 12, 2018
6	"Stockholm Syndrome"	–	May 20, 2018
7	"Anita Hill"	–	May 26, 2018
8	"Monica Lewinsky"	–	June 2, 2018
9	"The Clinton Impeachment"	–	June 9, 2018
10	"The Jonestown Massacre"	Rachel Monroe	June 16, 2018
11	"Snuff Films"	–	June 25, 2018
12	"10th Episode Spectacular!"	–	July 14, 2018
13	""The Godfather""	–	July 21, 2018
14	"Kurt Cobain and "Copycat Suicide""	Candace Opper	July 28, 2018
15	"Alpha Males"	–	August 4, 2018
16	"D.A.R.E."	–	August 18, 2018
17	"Jeffrey Dahmer"	–	September 1, 2018
18	"Iran-Contra"	–	September 10, 2018
19	"Columbine"	Rachel Monroe	September 17, 2018
20	"The Obesity Epidemic"	–	September 19, 2018
21	"Multiple Personality Disorder"	–	October 1, 2018
22	"Shaken Baby Syndrome"	–	October 8, 2018
23	"Halloween Special! Ed Gein and Slasher Movies"	–	October 17, 2018
24	"Urban Legends Spectacular!"	–	October 24, 2018
25	"Stranger Danger"	–	October 31, 2018
26	"Lorena Bobbitt"	–	November 7, 2018
27	"The Duke Lacrosse Rape Case"	–	November 14, 2018
28	"Roe v. Wade"	Megan Burbank	November 21, 2018
29	"Amy Fisher"	–	December 3, 2018
30	"The 2000 Election"	–	December 12, 2018
31	""A Dingo's Got My Baby""	–	December 19, 2018

=== 2019 ===
No.	Title	Guests	Original release date
32	"The Challenger Disaster"	–	January 3, 2019
33	"Enron"	–	January 16, 2019
34	"Tammy Faye Bakker and Jessica Hahn"	–	January 25, 2019
35	"Gary Hart"	–	February 17, 2019
36	"Acid Rain"	–	February 15, 2019
37	"Anna Nicole Smith"	–	February 20, 2019
38	"Terri Schiavo"	–	March 5, 2019
39	"The "Ebonics" Controversy"	–	April 4, 2019
40	"The Preppy Murder"	–	April 18, 2019
41	"Elián González"	–	April 25, 2019
42	"Dan Quayle v. Murphy Brown"	–	May 9, 2019
43	"Homelessness"	–	May 16, 2019
44	"Exorcism"	–	May 28, 2019
45	"The American Taliban"	–	June 5, 2019
46	"Sexting"	Amy Hasinoff	June 11, 2019
47	"Kitty Genovese and "Bystander Apathy""	–	June 20, 2019
48	"The Stonewall Uprising"	–	June 27, 2019
49	"Tonya Harding Part 1"	–	July 18, 2019
50	"Tonya Harding Part 2"	–	July 26, 2019
51	"Sex Offenders"	–	August 7, 2019
52	"The Victims' Rights Movement"	–	August 16, 2019
53	"Gangs"	–	August 22, 2019
54	"'Yoko Ono Broke Up The Beatles'"	–	September 10, 2019
55	"The Wardrobe Malfunction"	–	September 19, 2019
56	"The O.J. Simpson Trial: Nicole Brown Simpson Part 1"	–	October 3, 2019
57	"The O.J. Simpson Trial: Nicole Brown Simpson Part 2"	–	October 17, 2019
58	"The O.J. Simpson Trial: Paula Barbieri Part 1"	–	November 1, 2019
59	"The O.J. Simpson Trial: Marcia Clark Part 1"	–	November 14, 2019
60	"Human Trafficking"	–	November 25, 2019
61	"The O.J. Simpson Trial: Paula Barbieri Part 2"	–	December 2, 2019
62	"The O.J. Simpson Trial: Kato Kaelin Part 1"	–	December 16, 2019

=== 2020 ===
No.	Title	Guests	Original release date
63	"D.C. Snipers Part 1"	–	January 6, 2020
64	"The O.J. Simpson Trial: Kato Kaelin Part 2"	–	January 20, 2020
65	"D.C. Snipers Part 2"	–	February 3, 2020
66	"Why Didn't Anyone Go to Prison for the Financial Crisis?"	–	February 10, 2020
67	"D.C. Snipers Part 3"	–	February 24, 2020
68	"The O.J. Simpson Trial: Marcia Clark Part 2"	–	March 9, 2020
69	"D.C. Snipers Part 4"	–	March 23, 2020
70	"Quarantine Book Club: "Michelle Remembers" (Week 1)"	–	March 26, 2020
71	"The Exploding Ford Pinto"	–	April 2, 2020
72	"Quarantine Book Club: "Michelle Remembers" (Week 2)"	–	April 6, 2020
73	"Marie Antoinette"	Dana Schwartz	April 13, 2020
74	"Quarantine Book Club: "Michelle Remembers" (Week 3)"	–	April 16, 2020
75	"Quarantine Book Club: "Michelle Remembers" (Week 4)"	–	April 23, 2020
76	"The O.J. Simpson Trial: When Kato Met Marcia"	–	April 27, 2020
77	"Quarantine Book Club: "Michelle Remembers" (Week 5)"	–	April 30, 2020
78	"The Y2K Bug"	–	May 4, 2020
79	"Quarantine Deep Dive: Jessica Simpson's "Open Book" (Week 1)"	–	May 7, 2020
80	"Quarantine Deep Dive: Jessica Simpson's "Open Book" (Week 2)"	–	May 14, 2020
81	"The Disappearance of Chandra Levy"	–	May 25, 2020
82	"Quarantine Deep Dive: Jessica Simpson's "Open Book" (Week 3)"	–	May 28, 2020
83	"Anastasia"	Dana Schwartz	June 1, 2020
–	"Re-Release: The Stonewall Uprising"	–	June 4, 2020
84	"Quarantine Deep Dive: Jessica Simpson's "Open Book" (The Conclusion!)"	–	June 8, 2020
85	"The O.J. Simpson Trial: The Bronco Chase"	–	June 17, 2020
86	"Deep Dive: Nancy Grace's "Objection!" (Week 1)"	–	June 18, 2020
87	""The Prom Mom""	–	June 25, 2020
88	"Courtney Love"	Candace Opper	June 29, 2020
89	"Koko The Gorilla"	–	July 6, 2020
90	"Deep Dive Week 2: Nancy Grace v. The Defense"	–	July 13, 2020
–	"Bonus Episode! Sarah and Mike on "The Feminist Present" Podcast"	–	July 16, 2020
91	"Deep Dive Week 3: Nancy Grace v. The Jury"	–	July 20, 2020
92	"Murder"	–	July 27, 2020
93	"Disco Demolition Night"	–	August 3, 2020
94	"Wayfair and Human Trafficking Statistics"	–	August 10, 2020
95	"The Stepford Wives"	–	August 24, 2020
96	"Bonus Episode! Sarah's New Podcast "Why Are Dads""	–	August 27, 2020
97	"Deep Dive Week 4: Nancy Grace v. The Constitution"	–	August 31, 2020
98	"Tuskegee Syphilis Study Part 1: The Lie"	–	September 8, 2020
99	"Tuskegee Syphilis Study Part 2: The Truth"	–	September 14, 2020
100	"Killer Clowns"	Chelsey Weber-Smith	September 21, 2020
101	"Princess Diana Part 1: The Courtship"	–	September 28, 2020
102	"Princess Diana Part 2: The Wedding"	–	October 5, 2020
103	"Princess Diana Part 3: The Affairs"	–	October 12, 2020
104	"Halloween Special: Creepy Encounters"	–	October 19, 2020
–	"Bonus: The President's Physical Fitness Test"	Aubrey Gordon	October 22, 2020
–	"Bonus: Why Are Dads on "Terminator 2""	Alex Steed	October 29, 2020
105	"Princess Diana Part 4: The Divorce"	–	November 2, 2020
106	"Princess Diana Part 5: The Crash"	–	November 9, 2020
107	"The Electoral College"	Jamelle Bouie	November 16, 2020
–	"Bonus: The "Twinkie Defense""	–	November 19, 2020
108	"The Newsboys' Strike of 1899 (Part 1)"	–	November 23, 2020
109	"The Newsboys' Strike of 1899 (Part 2)"	–	November 30, 2020
110	"Losing Relatives to Fox News"	–	December 7, 2020
111	"The Stanford Prison Experiment"	–	December 21, 2020
112	"The O.J. Simpson Trial: Paula Escapes From L.A."	–	December 28, 2020

=== 2021 ===
No.	Title	Guests	Original release date
113	"The O.J. Simpson Trial: My Fair Paula"	–	January 11, 2021
114	"Shannon Faulkner & Sex Discrimination at The Citadel"	–	January 18, 2021
115	"The O.J. Simpson Trial: The Arraignmaker"	–	January 25, 2021
116	"The Anti-Vaccine Movement"	Eric Michael Garcia	February 1, 2021
117	"Tipper Gore vs. Heavy Metal: The Case Against "Porn Rock""	–	February 8, 2021
118	"Tipper Gore vs. Heavy Metal: The Hearing"	–	February 15, 2021
119	"The O.J. Simpson Trial: The DeLorean Detour"	–	February 22, 2021
–	"Bonus: "The Dark Knight""	Aubrey Gordon, Alex Steed	March 1, 2021
120	"Vanessa Williams Part 1: Becoming Miss America"	–	March 8, 2021
–	"Bonus: Dr. Oz"	Aubrey Gordon	March 15, 2021
121	"Vanessa Williams Part 2: Saving The Best For Last"	Cassie da Costa	March 22, 2021
122	"The O.J. Simpson Trial: From the Mixed-Up Files of Mr. F. Lee Bailey"	–	April 5, 2021
123	""Political Correctness""	–	April 19, 2021
124	"The Chicks vs. The Iraq War"	–	May 3, 2021
125	"Cancel Culture"	–	June 7, 2021
126	"Summer Book Club: "The Satan Seller" (Part 1)"	–	June 28, 2021
127	"Summer Book Club: "The Satan Seller" (Part 2)"	–	July 12, 2021
128	"Summer Book Club: "The Satan Seller" (Part 3)"	–	July 26, 2021
129	"Summer Book Club: "The Satan Seller" (The Debunking!)"	–	August 9, 2021
130	"The O.J. Simpson Trial: Runaway Grand Jury"	–	August 23, 2021
–	"Re-Release: Dan Quayle vs. Murphy Brown"	–	September 6, 2021
131	"The McDonald's Hot Coffee Case"	–	September 13, 2021
–	"Bonus: The Great Protein Fiasco"	Aubrey Gordon	September 27, 2021
–	"Mike Lives in a Downtown Hotel"	–	October 11, 2021
132	"Catherine the Great"	Dana Schwartz	October 25, 2021
133	"Ed and Lorraine Warren"	Jamie Loftus	November 8, 2021
134	"True Crime"	Emma Berquist	November 21, 2021
135	"Reconstruction"	Jamelle Bouie	December 5, 2021
136	"Winter Book Club: The Amityville Horror Part 1"	Jamie Loftus	December 20, 2021

=== 2022 ===
No.	Title	Guests	Original release date
137	"Winter Book Club: The Amityville Horror Part 2"	Jamie Loftus	January 3, 2022
138	"Talking Tammy Faye Bakker"	Jessica Chastain	January 10, 2022
139	"Tom Cruise on Oprah's couch"	Willa Paskin	January 24, 2022
140	"Winter Book Club: The Amityville Horror Part 3"	Jamie Loftus	February 6, 2022
141	"CSI: Junk Science"	Josie Duffy Rice	February 20, 2022
–	"Bonus: Groundhog Day"	Alex Steed, Josh Gondelman	March 7, 2022
142	"Ronald Reagan and "The Welfare Queen""	Laci Mosley	March 14, 2022
143	"Juliet's Balcony"	Chelsey Weber-Smith	March 28, 2022
144	"How Email Took Over the World"	Anne Helen Petersen	April 11, 2022
145	"Medieval Torture"	Dana Schwartz	April 25, 2022
146	"Go Ask Alice Part 1"	Carmen Maria Machado	May 9, 2022
147	"The Prison Boom"	Shannon Heffernan	May 23, 2022
148	"The Dyatlov Pass Incident"	Blair Braverman	June 6, 2022
149	"Martha Stewart"	Sarah Archer	June 20, 2022
150	"Go Ask Alice Part 2"	Carmen Maria Machado	July 4, 2022
151	"Go Ask Alice Part 3"	Rick Emerson, Carmen Maria Machado	July 4, 2022
152	"Eugenics"	Eric Michael Garcia	July 18, 2022
153	"Porn Wars"	Nona Willis Aronowitz	August 2, 2022
154	"Henry Lee Lucas"	Rachel Monroe	August 15, 2022
155	"The Donner Party"	Chelsey Weber-Smith	August 29, 2022
156	"Hunting Serial Killers"	Michael Hobbes	September 12, 2022
157	"Online Shopping"	Amanda Mull	October 3, 2022
–	"Your Abortion Stories"	–	October 17, 2022
158	"Flight 571: Survival in the Andes"	Blair Braverman	October 31, 2022
159	"The Movie Rating System"	Karina Longworth	November 15, 2022
160	"Where Have All the Preppies Gone?"	Avery Trufelman	November 28, 2022
161	"Beanie Babies"	Jamie Loftus	December 12, 2022
162	"Baby Jessica"	Blair Braverman	December 26, 2022

=== 2023 ===
No.	Title	Guests	Original release date
163	"Karen Carpenter Part 1"	Carolyn Kendrick	January 16, 2023
164	"Karen Carpenter Part 2"	Carolyn Kendrick	January 30, 2023
165	"Napster"	Niko Stratis	February 13, 2023
166	"Chris McCandless"	Blair Braverman	February 27, 2023
Author, professional musher, and frequent guest of the show Blair Braverman returns to discuss Chris McCandless's life of adventure and his untimely death in the Alaskan wilderness. Braverman describes McCandless's upbringing in an emotionally fraught and unstable household and how it brought about his nomadic lifestyle. Braverman provides an invaluable lens on McCandless's death, illustrating how the arrogance and misunderstanding of other Alaskan survivalists have clouded his legacy.
167	"Juvenile "Justice""	Josie Duffy Rice	March 13, 2023
Writer, podcaster and friend of the show Josie Duffy Rice returns to discuss the history and politics of juvenile "justice" in the United States. Rice outlines the 1838 Ex Parte Crouse Supreme Court decision and doctrine of parens patriae, which empowered the government to remove children from 'unfit' parents, as the genesis of juvenile "justice". Rice emphasizes the essentiality of race in this discourse—while deviant white children were thought capable of reform, Black children were considered incorrigible. Rice and Marshall discuss children's due process rights, charging children as adults, and giving children life sentences while simultaneously considering the ethicality, morality, and efficacy of past and contemporary juvenile "justice".
168	"What Even Is Justice?"	Amanda Knox	March 28, 2023
169	"Sinéad O'Connor"	Allyson McCabe	April 10, 2023
170	"Debi Thomas"	Leslie Gray Streeter	April 25, 2023
171	"We Need to Talk About the New York Times"	Tuck Woodstock	May 15, 2023
–	"The Hot Mess Express Spectacular!"	–	May 29, 2023
172	"Lesbian Seagulls"	Lulu Miller	June 12, 2023
173	"Renée Richards"	Julie Kliegman	June 26, 2023
174	"Fleetwood Mac's Rumours"	Carolyn Kendrick	July 11, 2023
175	"Bonnie and Clyde (and Blanche and Buck)"	Jamie Loftus	July 17, 2023
176	"The Cottingley Fairies"	Chelsey Weber-Smith	August 7, 2023
177	"The Most Normal Girl in Cleveland"	Heather Radke	August 21, 2023
178	"Sound of Freedom"	Michael Hobbes	September 5, 2023
179	"Changing Your Mind"	Listener Call In	September 18, 2023
180	"Mindhunting"	Sarah Weinman	October 2, 2023
181	"Lizzie Borden"	Princess Weekes	October 16, 2023
–	"Joint episode with American Hysteria"	Chelsey Weber-Smith	October 17, 2023
182	"Our Dearest Fears"	Chelsey Weber-Smith	October 30, 2023
183	"Amy Winehouse"	Eve Lindley	November 14, 2023
184	"Cattle Mutilation"	Rachel Monroe	November 27, 2023
Sarah and Rachel dissect the other-worldly phenomenon of cattle mutilation as a materialisation of beef industry angst under Richard Nixon. Discussion centres broadly around people's perverse fascination with the macabre, the extremely warranted distrust in the United States government, and the under-recognised human stories within this tabloid fodder.
185	"Influencers"	Taylor Lorenz	December 11, 2023
186	"The Exorcist"	Marlena Williams	December 27, 2023

=== 2024 ===
No.	Title	Guests	Original release date
187	"The Battle of the Sexes"	Julie Kliegman	January 8, 2024
188	"The "Pro-Life" Movement"	Megan Burbank	January 25, 2024
189	"Tiny Tim"	Harmony Colangelo	February 6, 2024
190	"The Shoe Bomber"	Miles Klee	February 20, 2024
191	"Balto"	Blair Braverman	March 4, 2024
192	"The Oscars Streaker"	Michael Schulman	March 18, 2024
–	"Bonus: Britney Spears Book Club"	Eve Lindley	March 25, 2024
193	"Hoax Spectacular!"	Chelsey Weber-Smith	April 1, 2024
194	"George Michael Part 1"	Marcus McCann	April 16, 2024
195	"George Michael Part 2"	Marcus McCann	May 1, 2024
196	"Rosa Parks"	Princess Weekes	May 14, 2024
197	"The Tradwife Rises"	Sarah Archer	May 29, 2024
198	"Immigration"	Alejandra Oliva	June 11, 2024
199	"Phones Are Good, Actually"	Taylor Lorenz	June 25, 2024
–	"Bonus: The Wonderful Wizard of Oz audiobook!"	–	June 29, 2024
200	"Balloonfest '86!"	Harmony Colangelo	July 11, 2024
201	"Has the Supreme Court Always Been This Terrible?"	Mackenzie Joy Brennan	July 22, 2024
–	"Bonus: Satanic Panic Book Club: Rosemary's Baby and its cursed sequel, Son of Rosemary"	Sarah Archer	July 31, 2024
202	"Rosie Ruiz and the Marathon Women"	Maggie Mertens	August 5, 2024
203	"Dungeons & Dragons & The Satanic Panic"	Adrian Daub	August 19, 2024
–	"Bonus: Mazes and Monsters"	Adrian Daub	August 26, 2024
204	"The Jane Collective"	Moira Donegan	September 4, 2024
205	"Lawrence v. Texas Part 1"	Marcus McCann	September 18, 2024
206	"Lawrence v. Texas Part 2"	Marcus McCann	September 26, 2024
207	"Revolutions and Resistance"	Kellie Carter Jackson	October 12, 2024
–	"A MASSIVE SEANCE Live Show Tour with American Hysteria"	Chelsey Weber-Smith	October 18, 2024
208	"Halloween History"	Chelsey Weber-Smith	October 24, 2024
209	"Elizabeth Báthory"	Princess Weekes	November 5, 2024
210	"Cola Wars"	Miles Klee	December 14, 2024
211	"Santa Claus"	Sarah Archer	December 23, 2024

=== 2025 ===
No.	Title	Guests	Original release date
212	"Singing in the New Year with Carolyn Kendrick and Each Machine"	Carolyn Kendrick	January 1, 2025
213	"Aron Ralston"	Blair Braverman	January 13, 2025
214	"Alice Kyteler and the First Witchcraft Trial in Ireland with"	Molly Aitken	January 30, 2025
215	"Emotional Labor with Rachel Monroe and Ash Compton of Bad Therapist"	Rachel Monroe and Ash Compton	February 12, 2025
216	"The Worst Oscars Ever??"	Michael Schulman	February 27, 2025
217	"Your Joy and Resilience Stories"	-	March 26, 2025
218	"Hoax Memoir Spectacular"	Chelsey Weber-Smith	April 1, 2025
219	"Is Your House Too Clean?"	Sarah Archer	April 15, 2025
220	"Inventing the Teenager"	Harmony Colangelo	May 7, 2025
221	"Coyotes!"	Lulu Miller	May 24, 2025
222	"The Hitler Diaries"	Adrian Daub	June 11, 2025
223	"Pee-wee Herman Part 1"	Jamie Loftus	June 11, 2025
224	"Pee-wee Herman Part 2"	Jamie Loftus	July 16, 2025
225	"Corn Mazes"	Chesley Weber-Smith	July 31, 2025
226	"The Insanity Defense"	Mackenzie Joy Brennan	August 19, 2025
227	"Samantha Smith vs. the Cold War"	Maris Kreizman	September 16, 2025
228	"The Auralyn"	Blair Braverman	September 30, 2025
229	"Midnight Ghost Shows"	Chelsey Weber-Smith	October 14, 2025
230	"Introducing: The Devil You Know"	Sarah Marshall	October 28, 2025
231	"The Dictionary Wars!"	Gabe Henry	November 11, 2025
232	"Cold War Santa"	Sarah Archer	November 25, 2025
233	"The Listener Holiday Special"	-	December 23, 2025

=== 2026 ===
No.	Title	Guests	Original release date
234	"Keiko Part 1"	Brianna Bowman	January 27, 2026
235	"Keiko Part 2"	Brianna Bowman	February 10, 2026
236	"Keiko Part 3"	Brianna Bowman	February 17, 2026
237	"The Bluebelle"	Blair Braverman	March 4, 2026
238	"How to Deprogram a Guy in 10 Days"	Ben Brock Johnson & Amory Sivertson	March 17, 2026
