= Andrew McClay =

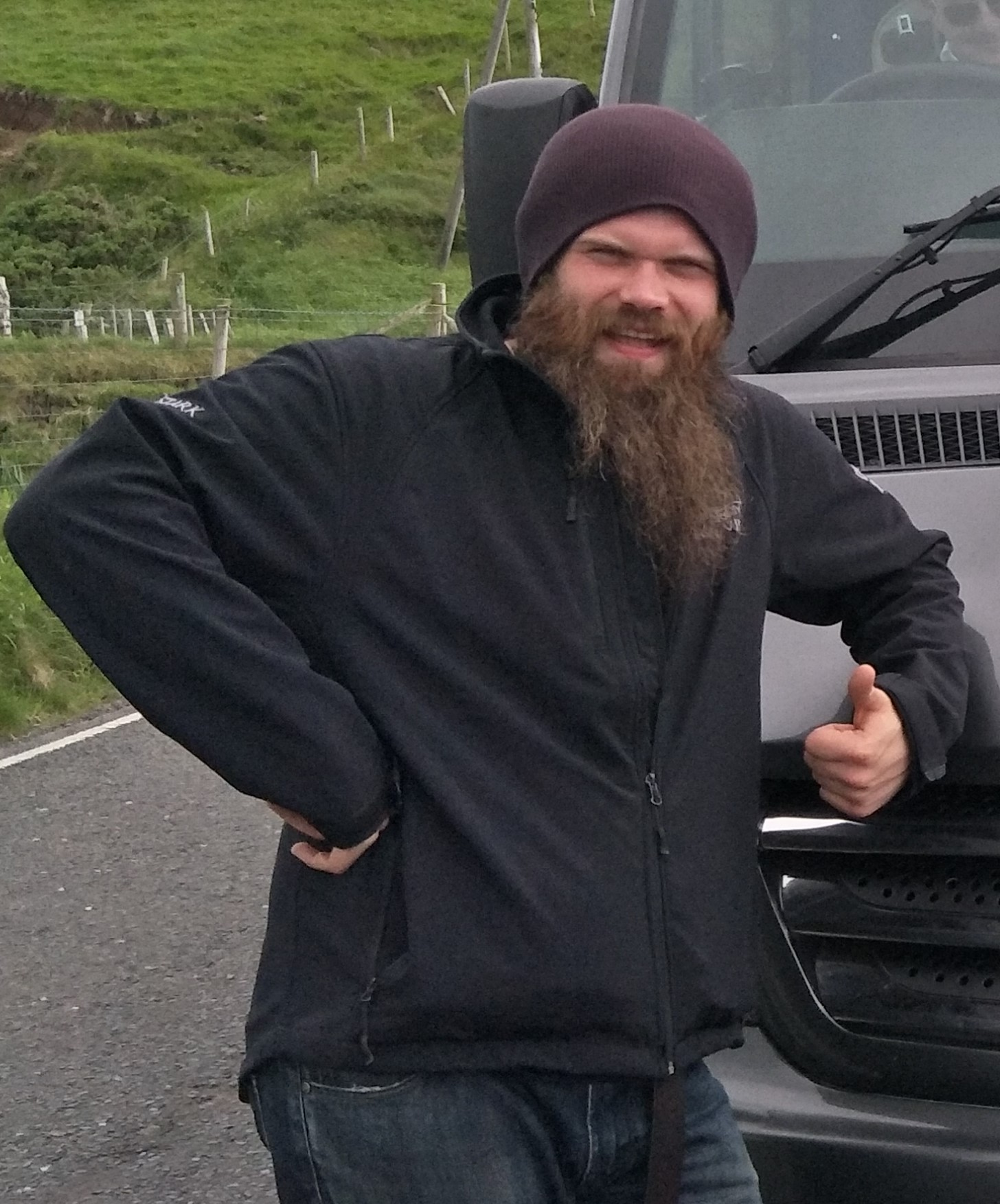
- McClay in 2017
- Born: March 24, 1984 (age 41); Derry, Northern Ireland
- Occupation: Actor
- Years active: 2017-present

Andrew McClay is a former extra on Game of Thrones who gained considerable prominence for his depiction in the Game of Thrones: The Last Watch documentary. Director Jeanie Finlay said about McClay: “I’ve found the heart of our film.” McClay first appeared as a Baratheon soldier in Season 5, who later becomes a Stark bannerman in Seasons 6, 7, and 8. McClay revealed in Game of Thrones: The Last Watch that his character's name across all 4 seasons was Aberdolf Strongbeard.

== Filmography ==
=== Film ===
Year	Title	Role	Note	Ref.
2019	Game of Thrones: The Last Watch			
2020	Damien	Andy		

=== TV series ===
Year	Title	Season	Role	Note	Ref.
	Ballywater				
