= Rainbow party (urban legend) =

Sexual urban legend

A rainbow party is a supposed group sex event featured in an urban legend spread since the early 2000s. A variant of other sex party urban myths, the stories claim that at these events, allegedly increasingly popular among adolescents, people wearing various shades of lipstick take turns fellating others in sequence, leaving multiple colors (resembling a rainbow) on their penises.

The idea was publicized on The Oprah Winfrey Show in 2003, and became the subject of a 2005 juvenile novel called Rainbow Party. Sex researchers and adolescent health care professionals have found no evidence for the existence of rainbow parties, and consequently attribute the spread of the stories to a moral panic.

== Origin ==
The earliest known use of the phrase "rainbow party" is by American Christian pediatrician Meg Meeker in her 2002 book Epidemic: How Teen Sex Is Killing Our Kids. The book related allegations of adolescents suffering cancer, sterility, acute infections, and unwanted pregnancies as a consequence of starting sexual activity too early in life. Meeker relates the following story alleged to be from a 14-year-old patient from Michigan:

[Allyson] had heard some kids were going to have a "rainbow party," but had no idea what that meant. Still, she thought it might be fun, and arranged to attend with a friend. After she arrived, several girls (all in the eighth grade) were given different shades of lipstick and told to perform oral sex on different boys to give them "rainbows." Once she realized what was happening, Allyson was too stunned and frightened to do anything. When a girl gave her some lipstick, she refused at first but, with repeated pressure, finally gave in. "It was one of the grossest things I've ever done."

Meeker's book did not gain much attention. The following year, the concept of the rainbow party came to mainstream attention: the August issue of Seventeen included an article on oral sex which quoted a sex educator describing the phenomenon, and in October that year rainbow parties were discussed on The Oprah Winfrey Show. In the Oprah feature, Winfrey's interviewee Michelle Burford, a writer for O Magazine, claimed that "among the 50 girls I talked to ... [rainbow parties were] pervasive". The 2005 novel Rainbow Party, inspired by the Oprah feature, generated more media coverage of the idea of the rainbow party; media interest in rainbow parties peaked in this year.

The sociologists Joel Best and Kathleen Bogle, in their book Kids Gone Wild: From Rainbow Parties to Sexting, Understanding the Hype Over Teen Sex argue that Meeker is unlikely to have invented the idea of the rainbow party. Though they were unable to find any evidence of it being discussed before Meeker's book, they suggest that it was likely an existing urban legend in relatively limited circulation among American teenagers which was made much more widespread by the media attention given to it. In an article for Reason, the journalist Cathy Young identifies the media attention to rainbow parties as part of a broader moral panic about oral sex, which she suggests was triggered by the Clinton–Lewinsky scandal which came to light in 1998.

== Continued attention ==
Following the controversy around Rainbow Party in 2005, rainbow parties continued to occasionally appear in media in subsequent years. They featured in the 2006 Jodi Picoult novel The Tenth Circle and a 2010 episode of the MTV comedy series The Hard Times of RJ Berger. News coverage spread outside of North America, and Best and Bogle found that newspaper articles continued to occasionally mention rainbow parties until 2009. In 2015 rainbow parties were the subject of an Icelandic short film, and an episode of Law and Order: Special Victims Unit.

== Evidence of falsity ==
Deborah Tolman, director of the Center for Research on Gender and Sexuality at San Francisco State University, wrote: "This 'phenomenon' has all the classic hallmarks of a moral panic. One day we have never heard of rainbow parties and then suddenly they are everywhere, feeding on adults' fears that morally-bankrupt sexuality among teens is rampant, despite any actual evidence, as well as evidence to the contrary."

Tolman found that several features of the story ring false. She was skeptical that many adolescents would be motivated to engage in such activity in the face of the severe social stigma still attached to sexual activity, and rejected the idea that they would examine each other's lipstick marks. The practicalities of rainbow parties have also been questioned. An article in The Philadelphia Inquirer concluded that "even if boys had the stamina to sustain such a series of performances, the lipstick would not".

Reason writer Nick Gillespie has claimed "Rainbow parties are as real as unicorns". Similarly, Best and Bogle say that while it is impossible to prove that no rainbow party ever happened, they were unable to find any evidence of them and conclude that there is no reason to believe that they were common. Distinguishing between real social issues and urban legends, they observed that "social issues receive vastly more attention", noting that in the period between 2003 and 2012, teenage sexting featured 100 times more frequently in newspaper articles despite there being no coverage at all before 2008. In an episode of the podcast You're Wrong About discussing urban legends, the journalist Michael Hobbes notes that while there is limited data on rates of oral sex among teenage girls, surveys of teenage boys' sexual behavior suggests that rates of teenage oral sex did not change between 1995 and 2011, despite concerns about teenage oral sex during this period.
