= Your Fat Friend (film) =

- Theatrical release poster
- Directed by: Jeanie Finlay
- Produced by: Jeanie Finlay; Suzanne Alizart
- Cinematography: Stewart Skylar Copeland; Jeanie Finlay; Lindsay Trapnell; Michel Palmieri; Donal Mosher; Aubrey Gordon
- Edited by: Alice Powell
- Music by: Tara Creme
- Distributed by: Together Films
- Release date: June 8, 2023 (Tribeca)
- Running time: 96 minutes
- Countries: United States; UK
- Language: English

Your Fat Friend is a documentary film directed by Jeanie Finlay. It follows author Aubrey Gordon for several years before and including the publication of her first book, What We Don't Talk About When We Talk About Fat, including breaking her anonymity as a blogger, the launch of her podcast Maintenance Phase, and the impact of her writing, including on her relationships with her parents. The film premiered on June 8, 2023, at the Tribeca Film Festival, and received positive reviews.

== Reception ==
Your Fat Friend won the Audience Award at the 2023 Sheffield DocFest and the 2023 St. Louis International Film Festival.

On the review aggregator website Rotten Tomatoes, 81% of 21 critics' reviews are positive. Peter Bradshaw of The Guardian wrote, "the humour and generosity of Gordon shine through." Sophie Butcher of Empire Magazine wrote, "A simple but effective study of a vital activist voice, this documentary is a powerful force for change." Jonathan Romney of The Financial Times wrote, "this is delicate, honest filmmaking from Finlay. A real gem." Christian Zilko of IndieWire gave it a C and wrote, "The choice between treating people with dignity and expressing genuine concern for their health is not as mutually exclusive as she makes it out to be."
