= Catland =

Catland may refer to:

- a 2020 book by Sarah Archer, identifying Japan as "Catland"
- a 2024 book by Kathryn Hughes, identifying the UK as "Catland" and featuring commentary on Louis Wain
- a 1977 cat art book edited by Rodney Dale and featuring Louis Wain's art
- a conjectured early spelling of Shetland
- a museum devoted to cats in Asse, Belgium
