= Blair Braverman =

American adventurer and writer (born 1988)

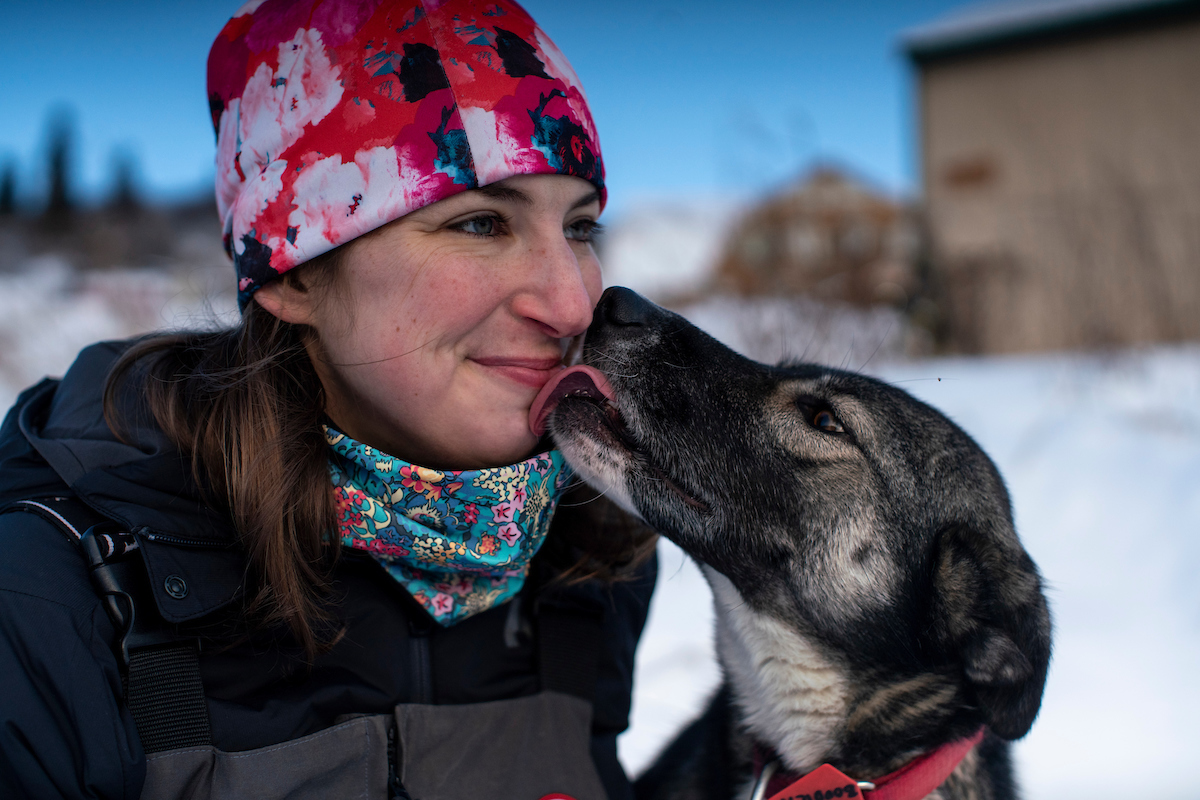
- Blair Braverman, writer and dogsled racer, with a sled dog along the Denali Highway in Alaska
- Born: May 7, 1988; California, US
- Occupations: Writer, musher, dogsled racer, adventurer
- Writing career
- Notable works: Welcome to the Goddamn Ice Cube; Small Game
- Website: www.blairbraverman.com

Blair Braverman (born May 7, 1988) is an American adventurer, dogsled racer, musher, advice columnist and writer. She raced and completed the 2019 Iditarod, the 1,000 mi (1,600 km) dogsled race from Anchorage to Nome, Alaska.

In 2016, the Outdoor Industry Association selected Braverman as one of its "Outdoor 30 Under 30" and author Sara Marcus called Braverman a "21st century feminist reincarnation of Jack London."

== Early life and education ==
Braverman was born on May 7, 1988, the daughter of research scientist Jana Kay Slater and university professor and author Marc Braverman. She was raised Jewish in Davis, California, in California's Central Valley.

At 10, she spent a year in Norway while her father researched the country's comprehensive smoking ban. She returned to Norway for a term in high school as an exchange student in Lillehammer, eventually graduating from Davis High School in 2006. Spending summers at Camp Tawonga, a Jewish camp near Yosemite, she later attended a Scandinavian folk school in Mortenhals, a traditional one-year trade program, and studied dogsledding and winter survival.

She returned to the United States in 2007, graduating from Colby College in 2011, where she studied environmental law. While in college, she wrote and published articles in magazines and newspapers, both locally and nationally. She also spent two summers working as a dogsled guide on a glacier in Alaska.

Braverman later earned a Master of Fine Arts in creative nonfiction at the University of Iowa, where she received a fellowship.

== Writing ==
Braverman's writing draws on her experiences working with sled dog teams and traveling in northern Scandinavia and Alaska. She has written about wilderness travel, sled dog racing, and life in remote northern environments in both nonfiction and fiction. She has been a resident Fellow at Blue Mountain Center and the MacDowell Colony.

=== Books ===
In 2016, Braverman published Welcome to the Goddamn Ice Cube, a memoir describing her childhood and early adventures in northern Scandinavia and Alaska.

The book recounts her experiences studying in Norway and later working as a dogsled guide in Alaska, and describes life in extreme cold, the culture of sled dog racing, and the practical challenges of wilderness travel. Alice Driver, writing in The Guardian, noted that the memoir addresses sexism and violence faced by women working in male-dominated outdoor professions.

In the book's blurb, author Sara Marcus called Braverman the "21st-century feminist reincarnation of Jack London" and the book was recommended by O, The Oprah Magazine.

In 2022, Braverman published her first novel, Small Game, which was an independent-bookstore bestseller. The novel is a wilderness survival story centered on contestants on a reality television program who are abandoned in the backcountry when production collapses. Stranded in an unfamiliar environment, the group must organize themselves, manage limited supplies, and decide how to survive.

Three years later, in 2025, she published the children's book The Day Leap Soared, illustrated by Olivia When.

=== Essays and journalism ===
Alongside her books, Braverman has written essays and reported pieces about wilderness travel, sled dog racing, and outdoor culture. Her work has appeared in publications including The New York Times, Vogue, Esquire, The Atavist, BuzzFeed News, and Smithsonian, among others.

In 2016, she published the essay "What I've Learned From Having a Trans Partner" in BuzzFeed News, reflecting on relationships and identity within outdoor communities.

=== Advice column ===
Braverman was a contributing editor for Outside and wrote the advice column Tough Love, which responded to reader questions about relationships, outdoor life, and personal challenges.

== Other works ==
In May 2026 Braverman started the storytelling Podcast "What to Carry, What to Burn" where she tells survival stories. The first story (two episodes) on Ada Blackjack had Sarah Marshall as guest and included mentions of handling sled dogs.

== Sled dog racing ==
Braverman has worked as a professional dog musher and has operated her own sled dog kennel in Alaska.

She trained for the 2018 Iditarod, and completed the 2019 race, finishing 36th in the 1,000 miles (1,600 km) dogsled race from Anchorage to Nome. She was only the second Jewish woman to complete the race.

In addition to the Iditarod, Braverman has competed in several other long-distance sled dog races. She finished in the top five in two major events: the 300 miles (480 km) Canadian Challenge and the 440 miles (710 km) Kobuk 440, a race across remote Arctic terrain in Alaska.

Her experiences racing sled dogs and training teams in Alaska have informed her writing about wilderness travel and northern outdoor culture.

== Media appearances ==
In 2015, Braverman was featured on the public radio show This American Life as part of the episode "Game Face."

Braverman appeared on a special episode of Discovery's Naked and Afraid in 2019, an experience she wrote about in detail for Outside. Also in 2019, she was a guest on The Today Show. After her appearance, Harry Smith continued to follow her Iditarod Trail Sled Dog Race effort; and the following week he featured a spot about her team, who raised over $100,000 for Alaska public schools during a campaign called #igivearod. The campaign continues to raise funds for causes in rural Alaska each year.

In 2021, she appeared on the New York Times' Sway podcast, in which she and host Kara Swisher discussed survival and resilience. Between 2022 and 2026, she was a guest on Sarah Marshall's You're Wrong About eight times.

== Bibliography ==
- Welcome to the Goddamn Ice Cube: Chasing Fear and Finding Home in the Great White North. 2017. ISBN 978-0-06-231157-3
- Dogs on the Trail: A Year in the Life, with co-author Quince Mountain. 2021. ISBN 978-0-06-306626-7
- Small Game. 2022. ISBN 978-0-06-306618-2
- The Day Leap Soared, with illustrator Olivia When. 2025. ISBN 978-0-06-323805-3

== Personal life ==
Braverman was previously in a relationship with Quince Mountain, a fellow writer she met in graduate school who became the first trans musher to compete in the Iditarod. They separated in 2025.
