= Persuasion (magazine) =

American political magazine

- Website type: Politics
- Editor: Yascha Mounk
- Website: persuasion.community
- Commercial: No
- Registration: No
- Launched: 2020

Persuasion is an American non-profit digital magazine and community focused on providing a forum for discussions of society, politics, and culture from a philosophically liberal perspective. Founded in July 2020 by political scientist and then-contributor to The Atlantic Yascha Mounk, the organization publishes an eponymous digital magazine, Persuasion; produces a weekly podcast, The Good Fight with Yascha Mounk; and hosts online events with speakers from across the political spectrum.

Pieces published by the Persuasion magazine are frequently reproduced internationally in translation in, among other outlets, the Italian daily Domani and the Spanish-language literary magazine Letras Libres. Articles have also appeared in translation in Krautreporter, L'Express, and other international media, and are discussed often on national television.

== Mission and orientation ==
New York Times columnist Thomas B. Edsall has described Persuasion as part of a "centrist countermobilization" against extremist views on both the left and right. In his founding manifesto, Mounk argued that "the erosion of values like free speech and due process within mainstream institutions [has] put philosophical liberals at a unique disadvantage". Mounk has described Persuasion as a new institution premised on the importance of good-faith disagreement and persuasion in resolving societal and political differences, in response to a perceived failure of existing institutions to defend traditionally liberal values. According to Mounk, the organization has three aims:

- To "build a free society in which all individuals get to pursue a meaningful life irrespective of who they are".
- To "promote the importance of the social practice of persuasion, and [...] defend free speech and free inquiry".
- To "persuade, rather than to mock or troll, those who disagree".

Persuasion is one of a number of new media outlets hosted on the publishing platform Substack. Its content, including magazine articles and podcast episodes, is free and publicly accessible. Paying members also receive access to events and discussions. As of April 2025, the site had over 100,000 subscribers.

== Leadership ==
The magazine and organization are led by Yascha Mounk, who serves as editor-in-chief. Persuasion is advised by a board of prominent thinkers from across disciplines and political positions, including psychologists Steven Pinker and Jonathan Haidt; political scientists Francis Fukuyama and Sheri Berman; journalists Emily Yoffe and Olivia Nuzzi; and former editor-in-chief of Foreign Policy Moisés Naím, among others.

== Podcast ==
The Good Fight podcast "searches for the ideas, policies and strategies that can beat authoritarian populism". A continuation of Mounk's podcasting at the think tank New America and Slate magazine, the weekly episodes consist of an hour-long discussion between Mounk and a single guest, generally on topics of politics, philosophy, or culture. Guests have included global leaders such as former Prime Minister of the United Kingdom Tony Blair, novelists such as Elif Shafak, and journalists Edward Luce, Emily Yoffe, and Ezra Klein, among others.

== Reception ==
The project has been cited or discussed in a variety of major media sources, including in the New York Times, The Atlantic, and The Washington Post. In an opinion piece for the New York Times, columnist David Brooks wrote that the project was part of "a growing rebellion against groupthink and exclusion". Jennifer Rubin, writing in The Washington Post, described Persuasion as one of several "alternative forums for virtual or actual face-to-face debate [that] are badly needed".

Persuasion has been criticized by some for a perceived excessive focus on "cancel culture" and left-wing illiberalism.
