= Why Men Marry Bitches =

2006 self-help book by Sherry Argov

- Author: Sherry Argov
- Publisher: Simon & Schuster
- Publication date: June 6, 2006
- ISBN: 9780743276375

Why Men Marry Bitches is a self-help book by Sherry Argov. Why Men Marry Bitches was featured on The Today Show and is the sequel to the author's first book, Why Men Love Bitches.

As explained in the Tucson Citizen, "Argov's book is based on hundreds of hours of interviews, reveals that most men will happily commit to a confident, secure woman who isn't desperate. She defines a 'bitch' as a strong and confident woman who doesn't put her man on a pedestal or behave like his assistant or underling. Put another way, most men are attracted to women who are equal partners."

On behalf of Maclean's Julia McKinnell noted, "The title is provocative but it's not really true that Argov believes a woman has to be a bitch in the sense of a catty battle-axe. She means a woman shouldn't be too nice." Argov advises, "Men want a close relationship, they want marriage. The key to a proposal, though, is to have them feel like it's their idea."

== Reception ==
Library Journal's Deborah Bigelow argued that Argov "busts the myths that a woman has to be perfect, be [a man's] sex toy, and be whatever he wants her to be." Bigelow concluded that Argov's "75 relationship principles cover everything from sex to finance and apply to readers of all ages".

Publishers Weekly wrote, "While encouraging women to be strong, independent and inscrutable is sound advice, the motivation behind this advice-to keep his interest-makes for a headache-inspiring contradiction. Fortunately, Argov takes readers step-by-step through her process, including numerous Relationship Principles that keeps her concepts clear . Though the generalizations Argov uses to describe her pre-bitch audience can at times be condescending, and her goals are more about acting--rather than believing--that you don't need a man to feel complete, the behavior she encourages is healthy and useful, even outside the realm of husband-hunting."
