= Goth Cruise =

- Directed by: Jeanie Finlay
- Theme music composer: Fyfe Ewing and Steve Nolan,
- Country of origin: United Kingdom
- Original language: English

Production
- Producers: Natasha Dack; Julie Goldman; Krysanne Katsoolis; Evan Shapiro; Nikki Parrott
- Cinematography: Steven Sheil
- Editor: Phil Reynolds
- Running time: 80 minutes
- Production company: Tigerlily Films

Original release
- Release: 20 January 2009

Goth Cruise is a 2009 British documentary television film directed by Jeanie Finlay.

The film follows 150 American and British goths as they travel around the Caribbean in the 4th annual Goth Cruise. The documentary explores the enduring goth subculture, its allure, and what it really means to be goth.

Rachel Venuti for Under the Radar rated the film a 3 out of 10, stating "Instead of a fun, playful investigation into the enduring allure of wearing black, we get an unfocussed mishmash of overgrown Goths with no discernible beginning, middle, or end". Heidi Williams for The Oregonian was more positive on the film, saying "It's amusing to see the "norm" passengers do double-takes as black-clad, tattooed, pierced and cross-dressing Goths parade through a gargantuan ship resembling a Las Vegas hotel."
