= Sheri Berman =

American political scientist (born 1965)

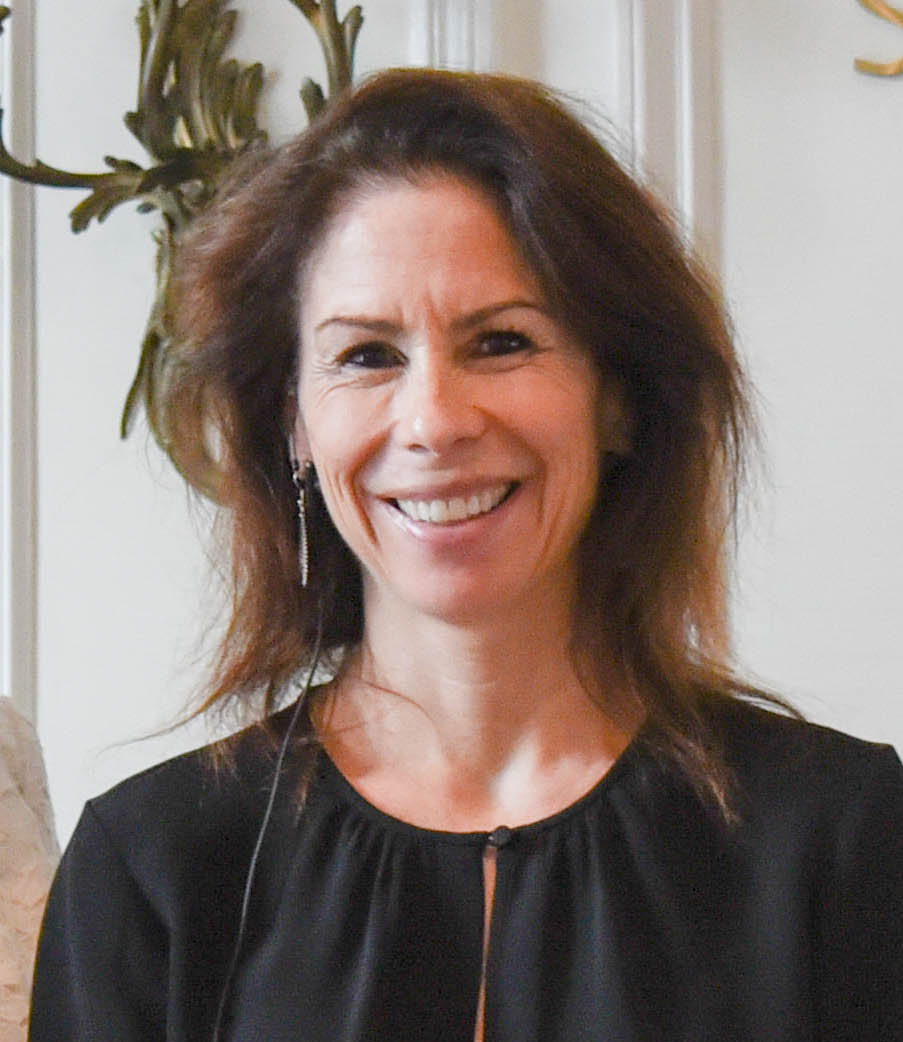
- Born: 1965 (age 60–61)

Academic background
- Education: Yale University, Harvard University
- Website: sheriberman.netlify.app

Sheri E. Berman (born 1965) is an American political scientist. She is a Professor of Political Science at Barnard College, Columbia University. She is the author of scholarly books and articles on European social democracy, fascism, populism and the development of democracies and dictatorships.

She has also published in a wide variety of non-scholarly publications, including The New York Times, The Washington Post, The Wall Street Journal, Foreign Affairs, Foreign Policy, VOX, The Guardian and Dissent. She is on the boards of the Journal of Democracy, Political Science Quarterly, Dissent and Persuasion.

== Education ==
Berman has a BA in political science from Yale University and an MA and PhD in government from Harvard University.

== Honors ==
In 2008 she was awarded an honorary doctorate by Uppsala University, Sweden

She served as Chair of the Barnard political science department from 2009 to 2012, and then again in fall 2021, as well as Chair of the Council on European Studies from 2014 to 2017.

== Selected publications ==
=== Books ===
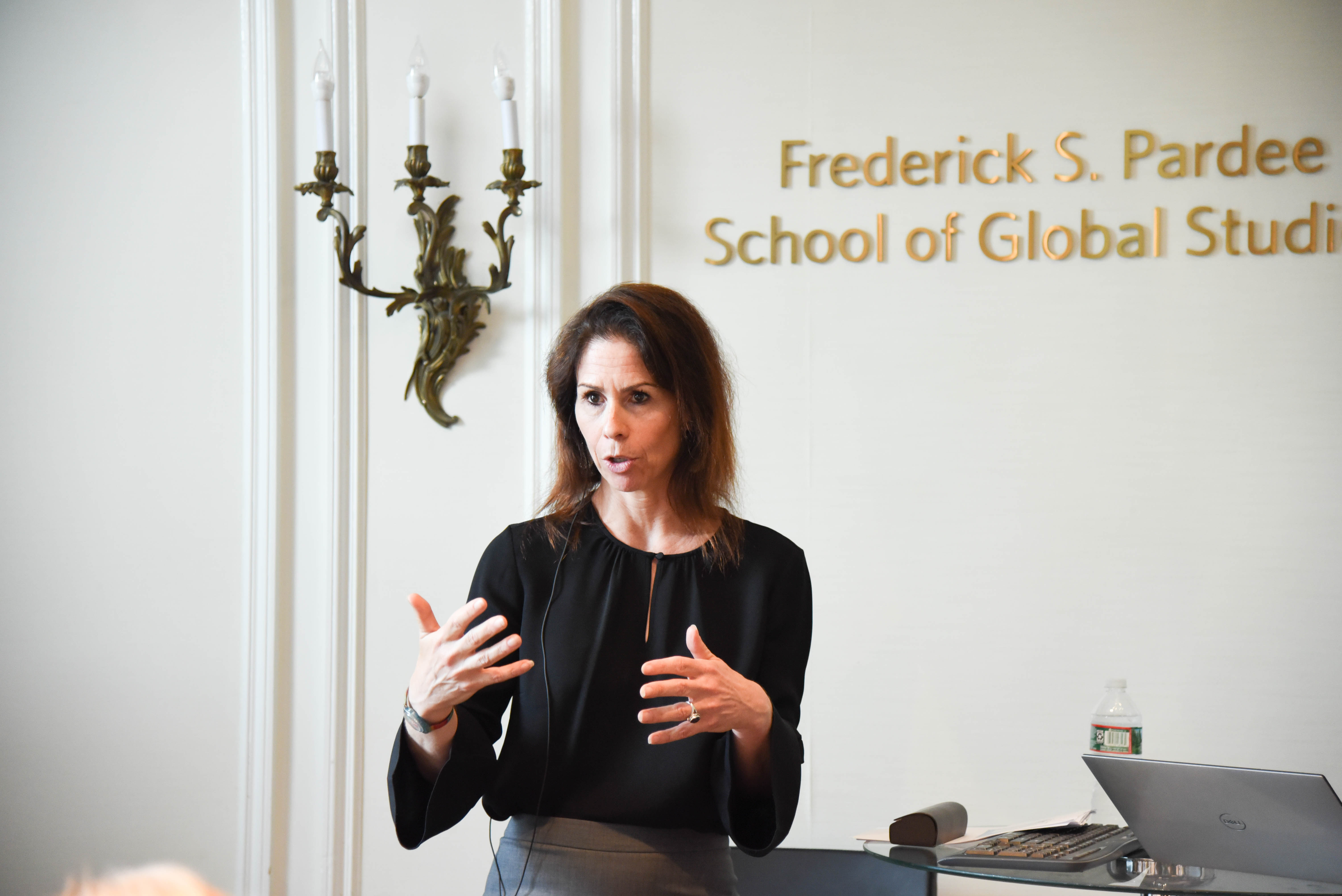
Berman lecturing

- The Social Democratic Moment: Ideas and Politics in the Making of Interwar Europe (Harvard University Press, 1998)
- The Primacy of Politics: Social Democracy and the Ideological Dynamics of the Twentieth Century (Cambridge University Press, 2006)
- Democracy and Dictatorship in Europe from the Ancien Régime to the Present Day (Oxford University Press, 2019)

=== Selected articles ===
- Sheri Berman (1997). "Civil Society and the Collapse of the Weimar Republic". World Politics. 49 (3): 401–429. doi:10.1353/wp.1997.0008. Wikidata Q139703533.
- " Civil Society and Political Institutionalization," American Behavioral Scientist, 40, 5, March/April 1997.
- " Path Dependency and Political Action: Re-examining Responses to the Depression," Comparative Politics, 30, 4, July 1998.
- "Modernization in Historical Perspective: The Case of Imperial Germany"," World Politics, 53, 3, April 2001.
- " Ideas, Norms and Culture in Political Analysis," Comparative Politics, 33, 2, January 2001.
- " Islamism, Revolution and Civil Society," Perspectives on Politics, 1, 2, June 2003.
- " The Roots and Rationale of Social Democracy," Social Philosophy & Policy, 20, 1, 2003.
- " The Vain Hope for Correct Timing," Journal of Democracy, 19, 3, July 2007.
- " How Democracies Emerge: Lessons from Europe," Journal of Democracy, 19, 1, January 2007.
- "Taming Extremist Parties: The Lessons from European Communism," Journal of Democracy, 18, 5, January 2008
- "The Primacy of Politics versus the Primacy of Economics: Understanding the Ideological Dynamics of the Twentieth Century," Perspectives on Politics, 7, 3, September 2009.
- "European Disintegration? Warnings from History," Journal of Democracy, 23, 4, October 2012.
- "Ideational Theorizing in the Social Sciences Since 'Policy Paradigms, Social Learning, and the State," Governance, 23, 6, 2013.
- "The Lost Left," Journal of Democracy, 27, 4, October 2016.
- "The Pipe Dream of Undemocratic Liberalism," Journal of Democracy, 28, 3, July 2017.
- "Populism is a Symptom Rather than a Cause: Democratic Disconnect, the Decline of the Center-Left, and the Rise of Populism in Western Europe'" Polity, 51, 4, 2019.
- "Populism and the Decline of Social Democracy," with Maria Snegovaya, Journal of Democracy, 30, 3, July 2019.
- Closing the representation gap, International Politics and Society, 7 January 2021
- "The Causes of Populism in the West," Annual Review of Political Science 2021 24:1

== See also ==
- Interwar period
