= Self-Portrait in Black and White =

2019 book by Thomas Chatterton Williams

Self-Portrait in Black and White: Unlearning Race
- First edition cover
- Author: Thomas Chatterton Williams
- Audio read by: Thomas Chatterton Williams
- Cover artist: Jaya Miceli
- Language: English
- Subjects: Race, identity
- Publisher: W. W. Norton & Company
- Publication date: October 15, 2019
- Publication place: United States
- Media type: Print (hardcover and paperback)
- Pages: 192
- ISBN: 978-0-393-60886-1
- Dewey Decimal: 305.800973
- LC Class: E185.97.W7345 A3 2019

Self-Portrait in Black and White: Unlearning Race is a 2019 book by Thomas Chatterton Williams. It was published by W. W. Norton & Company on October 15, 2019.

== Thesis ==
Thomas, the son of a black father and a white mother, who grew up identifying as black, explains in the book how he has come to unlearn his racial identity.

== Publication and promotion ==
The book was published by W. W. Norton & Company on October 15, 2019. Williams appeared on Real Time with Bill Maher on October 18, 2019, to promote the book.

== Reception ==
Andrew Solomon praised the book in The New York Times, writing, "He is so honest and fresh in his observations, so skillful at blending his own story with larger principles, that it is hard not to admire him. At a time of increasing division, his philosophizing evinces an underlying generosity. He reaches both ways across the aisle of racism, arguing above all for reciprocity, and in doing so begins to theorize the temperate peace of which all humanity is sorely in need."
