= Freddy McConnell =

British journalist (born 1986)

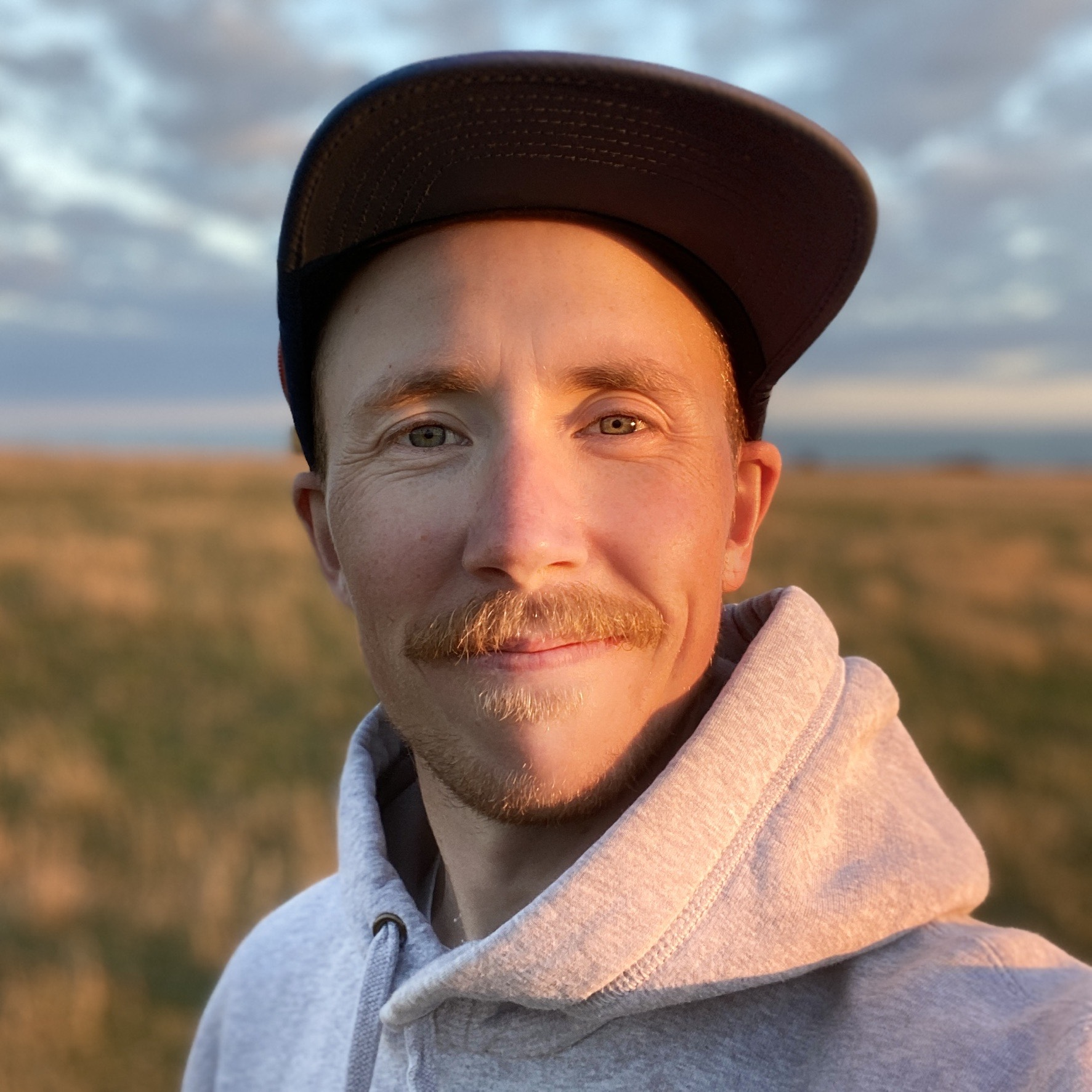
- Born: 1986 (age 39–40)
- Education: University of Edinburgh
- Occupation: Multimedia journalist
- Known for: Transgender rights advocacy
- Children: 2

Freddy McConnell (born 1986) is an English multimedia journalist who writes about transgender rights in the United Kingdom. He is best known for being a transgender man who has given birth. The experience leading to his giving birth is detailed in the 2019 documentary Seahorse, directed by Jeanie Finlay, which premiered at the Tribeca Film Festival.

== Education and career ==
McConnell grew up and lives in Deal, Kent. He studied at the University of Edinburgh and graduated with a undergraduate degree in Arabic. In 2011, He worked for the NGO Skateistan in Kabul, Afghanistan for a period of six months. While in Afghanistan, he transitioned publicly, and was accepted by his colleagues as a man.

In 2012, McConnell enrolled in a short-term American immersion programme for Arabic. This programme was through Middlebury College over the summer of 2012 in San Francisco, California.

As of 2019, McConnell worked as a multimedia journalist for The Guardian.

== Transition ==
From a very young age, McConnell experienced gender dysphoria. McConnell realized he was transgender in 2010 at the age of 23. He started his transition in 2013 with testosterone replacement therapy. A year later in 2014 he underwent a double mastectomy. He considered undergoing a hysterectomy, but elected not to because of his interest in possibly having children.

In January 2017, under the Gender Recognition Act 2004, he applied to obtain a gender recognition certificate to be legally recognized as male. His application was granted and he received his gender recognition certificate on 11 April 2017.

While he was choosing his new name, he decided he wanted to pick a name with family history. He chose his first name from his great-great uncle Frederic William McConnell. His middle name comes from his great-great-great uncle Reuben Poland.

== Pregnancy and Seahorse documentary ==
McConnell stopped testosterone replacement therapy in September 2016 to start the process of becoming pregnant. On 21 April 2017, he was artificially inseminated and became pregnant. He gave birth to his son in January 2018.

In 2019, McConnell recorded the experience of receiving artificial insemination and of his subsequent pregnancy in the documentary film Seahorse, which made its debut at the Tribeca Film Festival in the same year. The film was directed by Jeanie Finlay and made in association with The Guardian.

== Court case ==
McConnell gave birth to a son, publicly known just as SJ, in January 2018. When attempting to register the child's birth, the Registrar denied McConnell's petition to be listed as the child's father on the birth certificate, though allowing McConnell to use his current name. In September 2019, McConnell lost an application for judicial review to be described as father or parent on the child's birth certificate. Reports suggest that English common law requires those that give birth to be described as mother on the child's birth certificate, despite McConnell's possession of a gender recognition certificate under the Gender Recognition Act of 2004. The President of the Family Division of the Administrative Court also denied a declaration of parentage filed by McConnell. The president declared that McConnell was legally the child's mother and thus possessed parental responsibility of the child accordingly. Because of this decision, McConnell could not be listed as the child's father on the birth certificate. This decision was later upheld at the Court of Appeal in April 2020.

Four British newspaper publishers, Telegraph Media Group, Associated Newspapers, News Group Newspapers and Reach PLC, successfully applied to have an anonymity order affecting the case removed in July 2019.

== Life after court case ==
McConnell co-hosted the podcast Pride & Joy which aired on BBC in 2020. In this podcast, he discussed queer people having children.

His first children's book, titled Little Seahorse and the Big Question, illustrated by Rosalind Beardshaw, was set to be released in July 2022. Rebecca Trebble reviewing for the Progress Educational Trust's website wrote that the book has an "authentic feel" and features a "beautifully told story, outlining what it truly means to be a family."

McConnell announced his second pregnancy in August 2021, with plans to give birth in Sweden in order to be listed as the child's father, rather than mother, on their birth certificate. His second child was born in the UK in January 2022 via emergency c-section. McConnell has not publicly shared the sex of his second child, referring to them with they/them pronouns online. His children are referred to by generic nicknames on social media in order to protect their privacy, the eldest being known as "Shrimp" or "SJ" (The initials, McConnell revealed to stand for "Shrimp J", with J not standing for anything), and the second child as "LB" short for "Little Bird", neither nickname refers to the child's legal name respectively.

In December 2023 McConnell was a member of the University of Edinburgh team for the University Challenge Christmas Special.
