= Sound It Out =

2011 documentary film by Jeanie Finlay

Sound it out
- Directed by: Jeanie Finlay
- Edited by: Barbara Zosel
- Production company: Glimmer Films ltd
- Release date: November 4, 2011
- Running time: 75 minutes
- Country: United Kingdom

Sound It Out is a 2011 documentary film that documents the last surviving record shop in Teesside. It was directed by Jeanie Finlay, who grew up in Stockton-on-Tees, where the film is set.

The documentary follows the record shop called Sound it Out in Stockton-on-Tees. It was the official film of Record Store Day 2011. It was funded using crowdfunding, and was later bought by the BBC.

== Accolades ==
Sound it Out won the 2011 Leeds International Film Festival Cinema Versa award for Best Documentary.
