= Sarah Archer (writer) =

American design writer

- Born: New York City, U.S.
- Education: Swarthmore College; Bard Graduate Center (MA)
- Occupation: Writer

Sarah Archer is an American writer and curator based in Philadelphia, United States who specializes in design and material culture. She is the author of Catland: The Soft Power of Cat Culture in Japan (2020); The Midcentury Kitchen: America's Favorite Room, from Workspace to Dreamscape, 1940s-1970s (2019); Midcentury Christmas: Holiday Fads, Fancies, and Fun from 1945 to 1970 (2016); and Midcentury Christmas Stocking Stuffer Edition (2018), all published by Countryman Press. Archer has also been a regular contributor to Architectural Digest, Elle Decor,The Atlantic, 1stDibs, The New Yorker, Huffington Post, American Craft, Hyperallergic, and Slate, among others.

== Education and career ==
Archer was born and raised in New York City. She graduated from Swarthmore College (2000) and earned an MA in Decorative Arts, Design History, Material Culture from Bard Graduate Center in New York City (2006). Archer has served as a curatorial assistant at the Museum of Arts and Design; the director of Greenwich House Pottery; and the senior curator at the Philadelphia Art Alliance. She guest-curated Bright Future: New Designs in Glass at the Pratt Manhattan Gallery (2012).

Archer has been a frequent contributor to Architectural Digest, Elle Decor,The Atlantic, 1stDibs, The New Yorker, Huffington Post, American Craft, Hyperallergic,, and Slate, among others. Her writing has also appeared in Dwell, Hand/Eye, Herman Miller WHY, Untapped, and Modern Magazine.

Archer is a regular guest on the podcast You're Wrong About, where she has spoken with host Sarah Marshall about American contemporary home life topics such as food trends, Tradwives, Martha Stewart, and Santa Claus. She was featured in the CNN documentary The Many Lives of Martha Stewart.

== Bibliography ==
- Midcentury Christmas: Holiday Fads, Fancies, and Fun from 1945 to 1970 (2016)
- Midcentury Christmas Stocking Stuffer Edition (2018)
- The Midcentury Kitchen: America's Favorite Room, from Workspace to Dreamscape, 1940s-1970s (2019) (recipient of the 2019 Indies Bronze Medal for Popular Culture.)
- Catland: The Soft Power of Cat Culture in Japan (2020) (recipient of the 2020 Indies Gold Medal for Popular Culture.)
