= Meg Meeker =

American pediatrician and author

Margaret J. Meeker (born 1957) is an American pediatrician and author of books on parenting from a Christian perspective.

== Career ==
Her commentary on the rise of teenage sexually transmitted diseases has caught attention in education and popular publications. Meeker is invited onto broadcast programs on the topics she has written about, such as The Today Show, and The Ingraham Angle and she has a following in Christian groups on social and mainstream media and former President Donald Trump. Meeker is not professionally affiliated with conservative organizations. Meeker has written on gender roles in parenting and in adolescent psychology. She was formerly a supporter of birth control and later changed her views. Meeker cites psychological benefits as the basis of her support of sexual abstinence among teenagers, her views are quoted in analysis of the impact of pornography and the attitudes of the church to sexuality. She has appeared on various media programs such as 60 Minutes, The Today Show, Fox News's The Ingraham Angle, Donald Trump shared another one of her appearances on Fox & Friends, The Federalist, The Telegraph, and NPR. Her book Epidemic is the earliest known source of the Rainbow party urban myth.

Meeker is an adjunct clinical assistant professor at Michigan State University. She is a fellow of the American Academy of Pediatrics.

== Selected works ==
- Meeker, Meg (2002). Epidemic: How Teen Sex Is Killing Our Kids. LifeLine Press. ISBN 978-0-89526-143-4.
- Meeker, Meg (2007). Your Kids at Risk: How Teen Sex Threatens Our Sons and Daughters. Regnery Publishing. ISBN 978-1-59698-513-1.
- Meeker, Margaret J. (2007). Strong Fathers, Strong Daughters. Ballantine Books. ISBN 978-0-345-49939-4.
- Meeker, Meg (2014). Strong Mothers, Strong Sons: Lessons Mothers Need to Raise Extraordinary Men. Random House Publishing Group. ISBN 978-0-345-51809-5.
- Meeker, Meg (2008). Boys Should Be Boys: 7 Secrets to Raising Healthy Sons. Regnery Publishing. ISBN 978-1-59698-057-0.
- Meeker, Meg (2011). The 10 Habits of Happy Mothers: Reclaiming Our Passion, Purpose, and Sanity. Random House Publishing Group. ISBN 978-0-345-51807-1.
- Meeker, Meg (2017). Hero: Being the Strong Father Your Children Need. Regnery Publishing. ISBN 978-1-62157-502-3.
- Meeker, Meg (2018). You've Got This: Unlocking the Hero Dad Within. Regnery Publishing. ISBN 978-1-62157-731-7.
- Meeker, Meg (2019). Raising a Strong Daughter in a Toxic Culture: 11 Steps to Keep Her Happy, Healthy, and Safe. Regnery Publishing. ISBN 978-1-62157-503-0.
