= Michael Hobbes =

American journalist and podcaster

- Born: April 18
- Occupations: Journalist and podcaster
- Known for: Maintenance Phase, You're Wrong About, If Books Could Kill
- Website: https://rottenindenmark.org/

Michael Hobbes is a journalist and podcast host. He was formerly a Senior Enterprise Reporter for HuffPost. His writing has also appeared in Pacific Standard, The New Republic, and Slate.

Hobbes currently co-hosts the podcast Maintenance Phase, which criticizes the science behind health and wellness fads, and the podcast If Books Could Kill, which critically examines the premises of various popular non-fiction books. He also previously co-hosted You're Wrong About, which explores the truth behind popular narratives about well-known historical events and phenomena.

== Career ==
Before beginning his writing career, Hobbes worked in human rights for 11 years. He was previously a reporter for the Huffington Post, where he covered the new economy. He also writes journalistic and personal essays for left-wing publications including Pacific Standard, The New Republic, and Slate. His article on the plight of millennials was nominated for a National Magazine Award. He has also appeared in multiple episodes of WNYC's On the Media.

Michael Hobbes, along with co-host Sarah Marshall, started the podcast You're Wrong About in May 2018. Each episode centers a historical event or concept and breaks down the common myths and misconceptions that surround it. Unlike many history podcasts, one co-host researches the episode and the other blind-reacts to the information. During the COVID-19 pandemic lockdowns, the podcast gained a cult following. Hobbes decided to step away from the podcast in October 2021, citing his wish to end his involvement on a high note.

Hobbes and Aubrey Gordon have co-hosted the podcast Maintenance Phase since October 2020. The show examines the myths and "junk science" behind health, nutrition, and wellness trends, and have discussed topics including popular diets and diet foods, anti-fat bias, and eating disorders.

In November 2022, Hobbes and lawyer Peter Shamshiri launched If Books Could Kill, a podcast that breaks down popular non-fiction books like Freakonomics in the same style as Maintenance Phase and You're Wrong About.

== Reception ==
Hobbes' podcasts have received positive reviews from media outlets such as Vulture, The Atlantic, and The New York Times." In 2022, his podcast Maintenance Phase won a Webby Award for best podcast series.

Writing about Hobbes' departure from You're Wrong About in 2021, Vulture media critic Nicholas Quah called the show with Hobbes "deeply researched, funny, and heartfelt" and praised both hosts for their "level of self-knowledge" and "moral clarity."

After Hobbes questioned the veracity of a 2024 essay in The Atlantic about the political culture at The New York Times, Jonathan Chait wrote that Hobbes reflexively attacked stories inconvenient to left-wing causes, adding that media critics like Hobbes "don’t care what's true. They only care about what's useful." (Note: The Atlantic said that the story had been fact-checked and confirmed with multiple Times employees.)

== Personal life ==
Hobbes is gay. He has lived in Seattle, Berlin, the United Kingdom and Denmark. He is also an avid commuter cyclist.
