= Brittany Dawn Nelson =

American social media personality (born 1991)

- Born: March 22, 1991 (age 35)
- Other names: Brittany Dawn Davis (Note: Former legal name.); Brittany Dawn Greisen (Note: Name while operating Brittany Dawn Fitness, LLC.); Brittany Dawn Nelson (Note: Name while married to Jordan Nelson.)
- Years active: 2014–present
- Known for: Social media content and controversy regarding her business practices
- Spouse: Jordan Nelson (m. 2021)

Brittany Dawn Nelson (formerly Davis and Greisen; born March 22, 1991), also known simply as Brittany Dawn, is an American former businesswoman and social media personality. She gained attention in 2019 as an online fitness instructor and self-claimed nutritional expert who offered services through her company, Brittany Dawn Fitness LLC. She promoted diet plans, individualized fitness instruction and other products that were allegedly not received by customers. The controversy led to a lawsuit filed by the Texas Attorney General against Dawn for misleading Texas consumers about her services.

== Personal life ==
Nelson is from Texas and was previously married. She claims to have worked as a veterinarian technician for five years, but has never held a vet tech license in the state of Texas. In September 2021, Nelson married her second husband, former police officer Jordan Nelson. Nelson formerly worked for the Kansas City, Missouri police department and was sued by the American Civil Liberties Union for excessive use of force on an unarmed black man. Nelson is a practicing Christian and has been accused of changing her online brand from primarily fitness content to Christian-based content in order to escape controversy. She announced in 2024 that she was pregnant.

== Fitness and social media career ==
Nelson started her fitness career in 2014 and formed the company Brittany Dawn Fitness LLC. Her business claimed to have provided tailored personal fitness plans, nutritional advice and text message communication from Nelson. Complaints of Brittany Dawn Fitness not providing services that were paid for began to emerge in 2015; customers alleged that their personalized plans were generic and that Nelson never contacted them to initiate their plans. Later, complaints made about her business were deleted from her social media profiles. She later appeared on ABC's Good Morning America in February 2019 to address the controversy and later posted an apology video on YouTube. Nelson later began offering refunds to customers in exchange for signing a non-disclosure agreement (NDA). It was announced in February 2022 that the Texas Attorney General Ken Paxton filed a lawsuit against Nelson and Brittany Dawn Fitness LLC for violating Texas state consumer protection laws and seeking up to US$1 million in damages. As part of her fitness business, which was defunct as of 2019, Nelson received $20,000 through the Paycheck Protection Program during the COVID-19 pandemic. She operated Brittany Dawn Fitness, LLC under her previous name, Brittany Dawn Greisen.

In 2022 Nelson started a Christian ministry, She Lives Freed, and hosts conferences and retreats. It has been described as Pentecostal and a mix of Christianity and New Age.
