= The Rules =

1995 book by Ellen Fein and Sherrie Schneider

The Rules: Time-Tested Secrets for Capturing the Heart of Mr. Right
- The Rules book cover
- Author: Ellen Fein; Sherrie Schneider
- Cover artist: Diane Luger
- Language: English
- Subject: Relationships, Dating
- Genre: Self-help
- Publisher: Grand Central Publishing, (Warner Books)
- Publication date: February 14, 1995
- Publication place: United States
- Media type: Print
- Pages: 192
- ISBN: 0-446-51813-1
- OCLC: 30915354
- Dewey Decimal: 646.7/7-20
- LC Class: HQ801. F44 1995
- Followed by: The Rules II: More Rules to Live and Love By

The Rules: Time-tested Secrets for Capturing the Heart of Mr. Right is a self-help book by Ellen Fein and Sherrie Schneider, originally published in 1995.

The book suggests gendered dating rules that a woman should follow in order to attract and marry the man of her dreams; these rules include that a woman should be "easy to be with but hard to get". The underlying philosophy of The Rules is that women should not aggressively pursue men, but rather, should encourage the men to pursue them. A woman who follows The Rules is called a Rules Girl.

== Reaction ==
The book generated much discussion upon its release. Some audiences considered it useful and motivational, while others felt that it was outdated, anti-men and antifeminist, or a how-to guide that teaches women to play games that toy with men. Psychology lecturer and therapist Meg-John Barker claims that the emergence of seduction communities happened "almost as a direct response to this hard-to-get femininity". Others noted that Fein was an accountant and Schneider a freelance journalist without professional qualification in the subject matter. Fein married Paul Feingertz in 1984 and divorced him in 2000, citing abandonment; she married Lance Houpt in 2008. Schneider has been married for over 21 years. The authors admitted they were not professionals in an appearance on NBC's The Today Show.

They have countered the criticism regarding their credentials by citing the results of actually following The Rules, though there is no body of evidence to support this.

== Subsequent books ==
The book was followed by The Rules II, The Rules for Marriage, The Rules for Online Dating, and All the Rules. In The Rules II: More Rules to Live and Love By, published in 1997, Fein and Schneider proclaim, "If he doesn't call, he's not that interested. Period!" (p. 60). In 2001 the follow-up book The Rules for Marriage: Time-Tested Secrets for Making Your Marriage Work was released in the midst of Fein's legal separation from her husband to whom she had been married for sixteen years. Fein commented on her divorce by saying that she had "married the right man" for her at that stage in her life. Her argument was that after having written a best seller and raising two children, she and her husband discovered they were two different people from the young couple that fell in love. Fein married for the second time in 2008; she claimed to have followed The Rules to attract her second husband, with the exception that they dated for three years rather than two (as “The Rules II” advises) before becoming engaged.

== The 35 Rules ==
These are the rules as named in the original book.

- Be a "Creature Unlike Any Other"
- Don't Talk to a Man First (and Don't Ask Him to Dance)
- Don't Stare at Men or Talk Too Much
- Don't Meet Him Halfway or Go Dutch on a Date
- Don't Call Him and Rarely Return His Calls
- Always End Phone Calls First
- Don't Accept a Saturday Night Date after Wednesday
- Fill Up Your Time before the Date
- How to Act on Dates 1, 2, and 3
- How to Act on Dates 4 through Commitment Time
- Always End the Date First
- Stop Dating Him if He Doesn't Buy You a Romantic Gift for Your Birthday or Valentine's Day
- Don't See Him More than Once or Twice a Week
- No More than Casual Kissing on the First Date
- Don't Rush into Sex and Other Rules for Intimacy
- Don't Tell Him What to Do
- Let Him Take the Lead
- Don't Expect a Man to Change or Try to Change Him
- Don't Open Up Too Fast
- Be Honest but Mysterious
- Accentuate the Positive and Other Rules for Personal Ads
- Don't Live with a Man (or Leave Your Things in His Apartment)
- Don't Date a Married Man
- Slowly Involve Him in Your Family and Other Rules for Women with Children
- Practice, Practice, Practice! (or, Getting Good at The Rules)
- Even if You're Engaged or Married, You Still Need The Rules
- Do The Rules, Even when Your Friends and Parents Think It's Nuts
- Be Smart and Other Rules for Dating in High School
- Take Care of Yourself and Other Rules for Dating in College
- Next! and Other Rules for Dealing with Rejection
- Don't Discuss The Rules with Your Therapist
- Don't Break The Rules
- Do The Rules and You'll Live Happily Ever After!
- Love Only Those Who Love You
- Be Easy to Live With
