= Jeanie Finlay =

Artist and filmmaker from England

Jeanie Finlay is a British film director, producer, screenwriter, and artist from Stockton-on-Tees.

== Early life ==
Finlay was born to an English mother and a Scottish father, who worked in life insurance. Her mother encouraged her artistic, creative side. Finlay credits a stay with her grandmother in Winchester during a period of teenage illness as key in her decision to follow a creative path. Finlay studied art at Cleveland College of Art and Design and then contemporary arts at Nottingham Trent University. Her first film Teenland, grew out of making an interactive installation artwork Home-Maker about the lives of seven housebound, older people living alone, in Derbyshire and Tokyo.

== Career ==
Finlay's work includes a film about Aubrey Gordon - Your Fat Friend, a documentary made while embedded on the final season Game of Thrones, The Last Watch, along with the Bifa-nominated Seahorse, about trans man Freddy McConnell's pregnancy.

Her previous films include BIFA winning Orion: The Man Who Would Be King (about Jimmy "Orion" Ellis) the man many people believed was Elvis back from the grave, Panto! (a documentary about Nottingham Arts Theatre's 2012 pantomime production of Puss in Boots), the Bifa and Grierson-nominated The Great Hip Hop Hoax and Sound it Out, a documentary about the last record store in Teesside which was the official film of Record Store Day. The latter film was an early successful example of crowdfunding, having been rejected and then subsequently bought by the BBC.

== Awards ==
- 2023 Chicken & Egg Award
- 2021 Honorary Doctorate of Arts from Nottingham Trent University
- 2019 Nominated Best Documentary at The British Independent Film Awards for Seahorse
- 2016 Sheffield Doc/Fest Inspiration Award Winner at Sheffield Doc/Fest
- 2015 The Discovery Award at The British Independent Film Awards for Orion: The Man Who Would Be King
- 2015 Best Documentary at In Edit for Orion: The Man Who Would Be King
- 2013 Nominated Best Documentary at The British Independent Film Awards for The Great Hip Hop Hoax
- 2013 Nominated Most Entertaining Documentary at The Grierson Awards for The Great Hip Hop Hoax

== Filmography ==
=== As director ===
==== Feature films ====
- 2026 All Rivers Spill Their Stories To The Sea
- 2023 Your Fat Friend
- 2019 Seahorse
- 2019 Game of Thrones: The Last Watch
- 2016 Indietracks
- 2015 Orion: The Man Who Would be King
- 2014 Panto!
- 2013 The Great Hip Hop Hoax
- 2011 Sound it out
- 2008 Goth Cruise
- 2007 Teenland

==== Shorts ====
- 2010 Nottingham Lace
- 2003 Love Takes
