= Yascha Mounk =

German-American political scientist and journalist (born 1982)

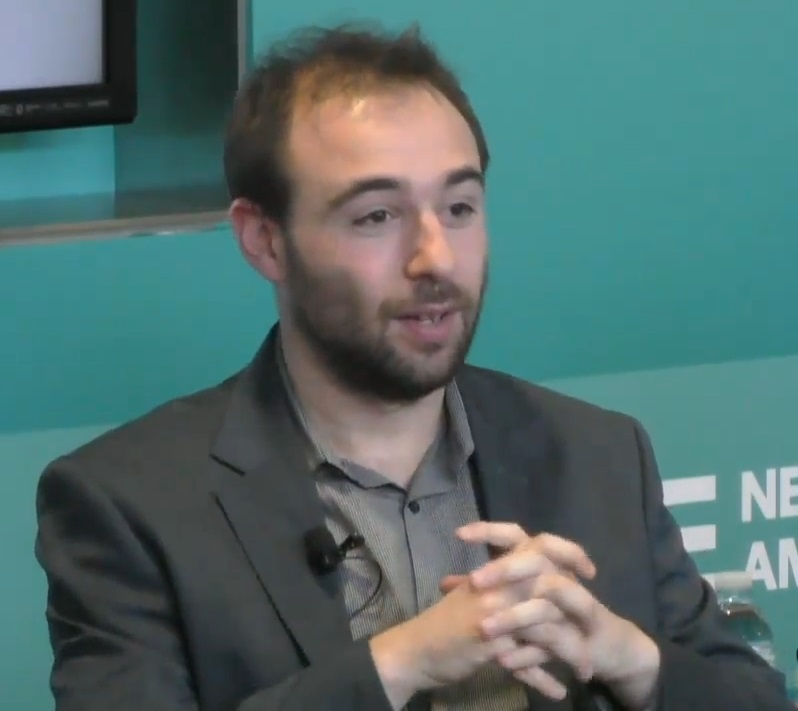
- Mounk in 2016
- Born: Yascha Benjamin Mounk; 10 June 1982 (age 44); Munich, West Germany
- Citizenship: Germany; US (since 2017)
- Occupations: Academic; journalist
- Political party: Social Democratic Party of Germany (c. 1990s – 2015)

Academic background
- Education: Trinity College, Cambridge (BA); Harvard University (PhD)
- Thesis: The Age of Responsibility (2015)
- Doctoral advisor: Michael Sandel

Academic work
- Discipline: Political science
- Website: yaschamounk.com

Yascha Benjamin Mounk (born 10 June 1982) is a German and American political scientist, academic, and author. He is Associate Professor of the Practice of International Affairs at the School of Advanced International Studies at Johns Hopkins University in Washington, D.C. In July 2020, he founded Persuasion, an online magazine devoted to defending the values of free societies.

As a freelance journalist, Mounk has written for The New York Times, The Wall Street Journal, Foreign Affairs, Slate, The Free Press, The Dispatch, and the German weekly newspaper Die Zeit.

== Biography ==
=== Early life ===
Mounk was born and raised in Munich. His mother was Jewish and a socialist, and she left Poland in 1969 after the purge of Jews from positions in the communist apparatus. Much of his mother's side of the family had been killed in the Holocaust. He has said that he felt like a stranger in Germany, and though German is his native language, he never felt accepted as a "true German" by his peers.

Mounk studied at Trinity College, Cambridge, and earned a Bachelor of Arts degree in 2003. He then earned a PhD from Harvard University in the US, with the dissertation The Age of Responsibility: On the Role of Choice, Luck, and Personal Responsibility in Contemporary Politics and Philosophy. He remained in the US as a lecturer on government, and he was named a senior fellow in the Political Reform Program at the think tank New America. Mounk became an American citizen in 2017.

=== Career ===
He was executive director of the Renewing the Centre team at the Tony Blair Institute for Global Change. As a freelance journalist, he has written for The New York Times, The Wall Street Journal, Foreign Affairs, The Atlantic, The Free Press, Slate, The Dispatch, and Die Zeit.

He runs a podcast called The Good Fight.

In July 2020, he founded Persuasion, a non-profit online magazine and community.

On 5 February 2024, The Atlantic cut ties with Mounk due to allegations posted on Twitter by a woman named Celeste Marcus.

In September 2024, Mounk took up a role as visiting professor at Sciences-Po Paris, before returning to Johns Hopkins in 2025.

== Political views ==
Mounk joined the Social Democratic Party of Germany (SPD) as a teenager. In 2015, he resigned from the party by publishing an open letter to then-chairman Sigmar Gabriel. He cited the lack of helpfulness of German institutions to refugees, the passive attitude of SPD leaders and other parts of the party during the Crimea crisis in 2014, and the SPD's policy on Greece, which he called a "betrayal of the social democratic dream of a united Europe."

In a February 2018 interview published in Süddeutsche Zeitung, Mounk stated that he had changed his position on nationalism. He initially considered it a relic of the past that must be overcome, but he now advocates an "inclusive nationalism" to head off the threat of aggressive nationalism. On the German television newscast Tagesthemen, he stated that Germany is on a "historically unique experiment, namely to transform a mono-ethnic and mono-cultural democracy into a multi-ethnic one." In the Israeli newspaper Haaretz, Mounk advised the "liberal camp" to adopt this inclusive nationalism to foster a multi-ethnic and democratic society: "The key ... is the adoption of the populist demand that people and nations should again feel they have control of their lives or their destiny."

== Bibliography ==
=== Books ===
- Stranger in my own country: a Jewish family in modern Germany. New York: Farrar, Straus and Giroux. 2014. ISBN 0-374-53553-1.
- The People vs. Democracy: Why Our Freedom Is in Danger and How to Save It. Harvard University Press. 2018. ISBN 978-0674976825.
- The Age of Responsibility – Luck, Choice and the Welfare State. Harvard University Press. 2019. ISBN 978-0674545465.
- The Great Experiment: Why Diverse Democracies Fall Apart and How They Can Endure. Penguin Press. 2022. ISBN 978-0593296813.
- The Identity Trap: A Story of Ideas and Power in Our Time. Penguin Press. 2023. ISBN 978-0593493182.
