= Summer of Our Discontent =

2025 nonfiction book by Thomas Chatterton Williams

- Author: Thomas Chatterton Williams
- Language: English
- Genre: Non-fiction
- Publisher: Alfred A. Knopf
- Publication date: 2025
- Publication place: United States
- Pages: 272
- ISBN: 978-0593534403

Summer of Our Discontent: The Age of Certainty and the Demise of Discourse is a 2025 book by American writer Thomas Chatterton Williams. The book critically examines the shifts in social justice ideology, media, and cultural discourse since the summer of 2020.

== Overview ==
In the book, Chatterton Williams argues that there was a paradigm shift in ideals of social justice in the United States over the early 2020s that significantly affected American society for the worse. Sparked by the mid-2020 George Floyd protests and the COVID-19 pandemic, and driven by other events and movements such as the Black Lives Matter movement, critical race theory, cancel culture, and diversity, equity, and inclusion policies, Chatterton Williams argues that social justice ideals moved away from liberal norms and towards a pessimistic, tribalistic, and intolerant identity politics among the American left. He then argues that this shift in turn caused a right-wing backlash against the American left that led to the resurgence of right populism and ultimately the 2024 re-election of Donald Trump.

== Reception ==
Correspondent Josh Glancy of The Times reviewed the book positively, saying that it was "a clever and compelling book that embraces complexity. Chatterton Williams’s style is a touch rarefied for my taste, his language inflected by the stodge of academic jargon, but his thinking is dextrous and his insights are acute." Kirkus Reviews described the book as a "thoughtfully reasoned contribution to the literature of race and racism in our time."

English professor Robert N. Watson of the University of California, Los Angeles gave the book a mixed review, saying that it "doesn’t quite hold together as a compelling argument," but that it does "contain valuable encouragement for the growing belief that Democrats—and progressives in general—may need to pay a little less performative attention to categories of racial and gender identity and more to social class and communities struggling with unemployment and opioid addiction." Tunku Varadarajan of the American Enterprise Institute also gave the book a mixed review, describing it as "consistently pretentious" and that it "often ends up a fence-sitter," but praising Chatterton Williams for his "laudable recognition of the excesses of progressives." Publishers Weekly said that, although the book had "keen insights," it "too often gets bogged down in its own anti-wokeism." Oliver Traldi of the University of Toledo wrote that, although some of Chatterton Williams' critiques were "excellent," the book was marred by its "ambivalence" and the fact that it was "inexpertly edited, and probably the strangest editing decision is the frequent inclusion of lengthy footnotes, which are usually digressive and sometimes run over to the next page."

Justin Driver of The New York Times gave the book a negative review, saying that "Williams’s analysis lacks proportion. He does not seem to grasp that the left’s illiberalism occupies a marginal position in mainstream Democratic politics and the right’s illiberalism possesses a stranglehold on the Republican Party" and that "he does not summon the energy to treat Trump with the sustained attention that the dominant political figure of our age demands. A book that purports to examine the last decade of racial politics but refuses to confront fully Trump’s political ascent and career cannot help providing a myopic vision of our era." Historian Pratinav Anil of the University of Oxford also reviewed it negatively, describing it as "a strange, muddled book," saying that Chatterton Williams claims to prioritise class over race while rejecting class politics and collective action, that he cherry-picked examples to smear the left, and that his critique of American politics focuses only on critiquing the left, without equally critiquing the right. Writer Andrea Long Chu wrote that "editorial indulgence has resulted in such a sludge of footnotes and block quotes that the eye must often dismount and continue on foot. The reader will find here no argument she could not have inferred from the titles of a dozen identical books on wokeness; nothing has been added but sentences." Journalist Mychal Denzel Smith also criticised the book, saying that it was "virtually impossible to disagree with without proving its grounding thesis... no matter what I say here, whatever inconsistencies I point out, whatever disagreements we have about the timeline of events and their effects, my engagement with his ideas can be dismissed as a result of my ideology, and further proof of his claim that his intellectual opponents do not wish to argue in good faith (as only he can define it)."
