= Why Men Love Bitches =

2002 self-help book by Sherry Argov

- Author: Sherry Argov
- Publisher: Simon & Schuster
- Publication date: October 1, 2002
- ISBN: 9781580627566

Why Men Love Bitches: From Doormat to Dreamgirl - A Woman's Guide to Holding Her Own in a Relationship is a self-help book by Sherry Argov. In the book, Argov defines a "bitch" as "an empowered woman who derives tremendous strength from the ability to be an independent thinker, particularly in a world that still teaches women to be self-abnegating. This woman doesn't live someone else's standards, only her own."

Why Men Love Bitches has been translated into 30 languages. It is followed by Argov's 2006 book, Why Men Marry Bitches. Both books are New York Times Bestsellers. Why Men Love Bitches was on the Los Angeles Times Bestseller list after its initial publication in 2006, on the Globe and Mail Bestseller list in Canada in 2009 and 2010, and on The New York Times Best Seller list in 2014 and 2015. In 2021, it was in the top 9 on The Sunday Times' bestseller list in the United Kingdom.

In 2021, Newsweek and The Times reported that Why Men Love Bitches had become popular on TikTok. By February 2021, the hashtag #whymenlovebitches had been viewed on TikTok over 9.2 million times. In 2023, Bustle reported that both Why Men Love Bitches and Why Men Marry Bitches had gone viral on TikTok and had reportedly exceeded 200 million views on the platform.

== Theater play ==
Why Men Love Bitches was adapted into a theater production in Mexico in Spanish under the title Por Que Los Hombres Aman a Las Cabronas. The show was produced by Rubén Lara and starrred Aracely Arámbula, Mauricio Ochmann, and Anastasia Acosta.

In 2021, the Los Angeles Times reported that the theater play had been performed in Mexico for 15 years, and that it was being performed in the United States in twenty cities.

== Reception ==
In 2023, the India Times wrote "In the dating game, just being nice to your man doesn't make him more devoted. That, in a nutshell, is the premise of best-selling author and columnist Sherry Argov's seminal books Why Men Love Bitches and Why Men Marry Bitches."

In 2023, Samantha Leach, writing for Bustle, described the book as "a no-nonsense relationship manual that encourages women to be assertive, exude confidence, and in turn, own their self-worth".

In 2021, Lillie Rohan, Entertainment editor for the New Zealand Herald wrote that the nice girl "is the 'yes woman' who routinely sacrifices herself to make her boyfriend's life easier. The strong girl[...]is 'nice' in societal terms but she doesn't let men treat her like trash. She demands mutual respect, and most importantly, knows her worth." Rohan opined that "Argov's hypothesis was correct."

In 2002, Publishers Weekly referred to the book as "sassy" and "filled with scenarios and advice aimed at making women subtly stronger and self-empowered," though noted that "Argov's principles [...] range from the farfetched to the downright absurd". PW concluded, "The book [...] should make waves with its controversial view of relationships".
