= Sherry Argov =

American writer

Sherry Argov is an American author. She is the author of the books Why Men Love Bitches and Why Men Marry Bitches. Both books are New York Times bestsellers.

In early 2021, the book Why Men Love Bitches was entered into The Sunday Times bestselling list under number 9. This increase in popularity occurred 19 years after the publication when the book went viral on TikTok.

Sherry Argov's books have been translated into over 30 languages.

== Books ==
- Why Men Love Bitches: From Doormat to Dreamgirl – A Woman's Guide to Holding Her Own in a Relationship (2002) ISBN 9781580627566
- Why Men Marry Bitches: A Woman's Guide to Winning Her Man's Heart (2006) ISBN 9780743276375, 978-1945876028
