= Game of Thrones: The Last Watch =

2019 documentary film by HBO

- Official release poster
- Directed by: Jeanie Finlay
- Produced by: Jeanie Finlay; Rachel Hooper; Martin Mahon
- Cinematography: Jeanie Finlay; Louise Liddy; Richard Jephcote; Aaron Black
- Edited by: Alice Powell
- Music by: Hannah Peel
- Distributed by: HBO
- Release date: May 26, 2019
- Running time: 115 minutes
- Country: Northern Ireland

Game of Thrones: The Last Watch is a 2019 documentary film that chronicles the production of the eighth and final season of HBO's medieval fantasy television series Game of Thrones. It was directed by Jeanie Finlay and aired on HBO on May 26, 2019, one week after the series finale of Game of Thrones.

The documentary details Finlay's experience on the set of the show over the course of a year, spanning from the first table read to the filming of the final scene. Described by HBO as revealing "the tears and triumphs involved in the challenge of bringing the fantasy world of Westeros to life", the film features behind-the-scenes footage and interviews with prominent actors and writers, as well as production assistants, costume designers, set decorators, caterers, and carpenters.

Game of Thrones: The Last Watch received mostly positive reviews from critics and audiences. It was nominated for Outstanding Music Composition for a Documentary Series at the Primetime Emmy Awards.

== Production ==
Director Jeanie Finlay had been a casual fan of Game of Thrones in the years prior to filming the documentary. Impressed by Finlay's past documentary films such as The Great Hip Hop Hoax (2013) and Orion (2015), HBO approached Finlay several months before filming for the eighth season began and asked her to direct a documentary about its production. Finlay met with producers David Benioff, D. B. Weiss, Bernadette Caulfield, and Carolyn Strauss a few weeks later and proposed the way she would shoot the film.

Finlay was given full autonomy of the show's set, with producers allowing her to film whatever she wanted with unrestricted access. Finlay spent "one week on, one week off" the set of the show, alternating between her work on Game of Thrones: The Last Watch and Seahorse, another documentary she planned to release that same year. The documentary's production was kept secret and only those involved in either Game of Thrones or the documentary itself knew it was being made. Finlay described having to keep the documentary's production secret as "overwhelming" but said that it eased the pressure of fan expectations. Before filming the table read, Finlay was given a copy of the season's scripts to prepare her for whose reactions she wanted to focus on. Finlay told NME that she had the scripts "before some of the cast had read it".

In late 2017, Finlay commissioned composer Hannah Peel to score the documentary. Filming for the documentary wrapped in July 2018 alongside the eighth season of Game of Thrones. Over 950 hours of footage was filmed over the course of 14 months. Finlay delivered her final cut to HBO two weeks before the first episode of the eighth season ("Winterfell") premiered.

Game of Thrones: The Last Watch was announced on March 27, 2019. HBO wrote that the documentary "delves deep into the mud and blood to reveal the tears and triumphs involved in the challenge of bringing the fantasy world of Westeros to life in the very real studios, fields and car-parks of Northern Ireland".

== Reception ==
=== Ratings ===
Game of Thrones: The Last Watch was viewed by 1.63 million viewers during its initial airing in the United States.

=== Critical reception ===
Game of Thrones: The Last Watch received mostly positive reviews from critics and audiences. On the review aggregator website Rotten Tomatoes, 100% of 10 critics' reviews are positive, with an average rating of 7.3/10.

Writing for Mashable, Alexis Nedd called it "a better ending than the Game of Thrones finale", praising the documentary's scope, direction, and focus. Nedd wrote that: "The documentary succeeds beyond its own merits though, because it reminds its audience of why they loved Thrones in the first place." Writing for Stylist, Hannah-Rose Yee said the documentary was "better than season 8", adding that it "has as much drama, action and emotion as Game of Thrones itself".

Writing for IGN, Jesse Schedeen gave the documentary 8.8/10, calling it "a very satisfying coda to the series", but felt that there were "many areas where the documentary could have gone into greater detail", especially in the writing department. Writing for The Daily Dot, Michelle Jaworski gave the documentary 3.5 out of 5 stars, calling it a "love letter to the show's crew". Jaworski was impressed by Finlay's direction, but felt that the documentary did not explore the post-production aspects of the season as well as it could have.

In response to the mixed reception to Game of Thrones's eighth season, Finlay said: "There's also going to be strong opinions so I sort of think that it's OK for people to express their passion, in whatever form that takes."

=== Accolades ===
At the 71st Primetime Emmy Awards in 2019, Hannah Peel was nominated for Outstanding Music Composition for a Documentary Series or Special for her work on the documentary.
