= Thomas Chatterton Williams =

American writer (born 1981)

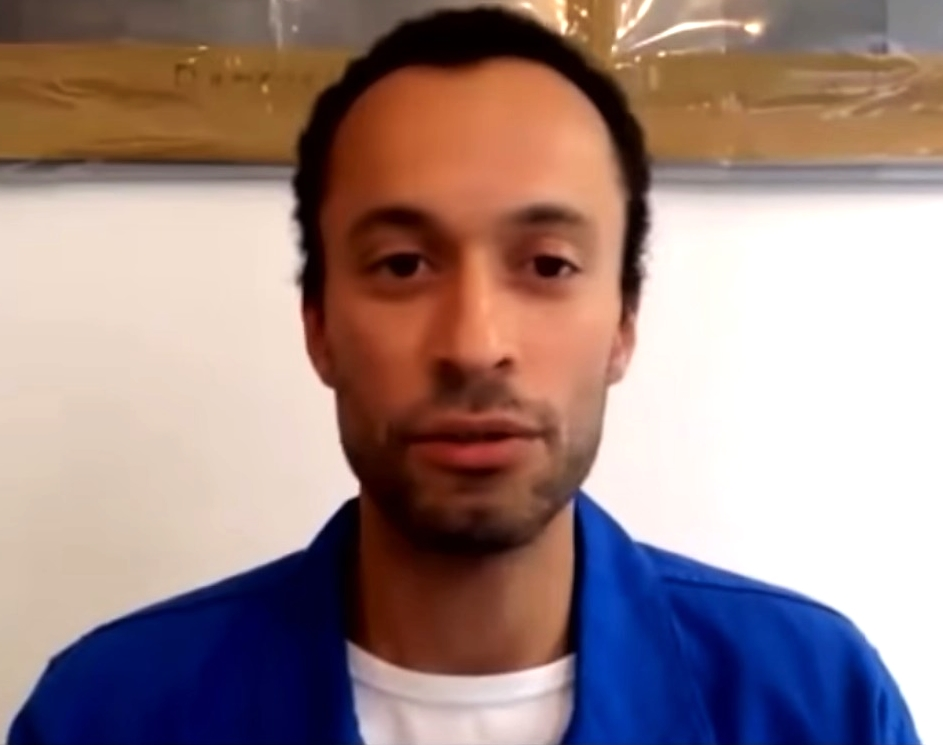
- Williams in 2020
- Born: March 26, 1981 (age 45); Newark, New Jersey, U.S.
- Education: Georgetown University; New York University
- Occupations: Critic, author
- Spouse: Valentine Faure
- Children: 2
- Writing career
- Years active: 2007–present
- Subjects: Race, identity
- Notable works: Losing My Cool (2010); Self-Portrait in Black and White (2019)
- Notable awards: Berlin Prize Guggenheim Fellow
- Website: thomaschattertonwilliams.com

Thomas Chatterton Williams (born March 26, 1981) is an American cultural critic and writer. He is the author of the 2019 book Self-Portrait in Black and White and a staff writer at The Atlantic. He is a visiting professor of the humanities and senior fellow at the Hannah Arendt Center at Bard College, and a 2022 Guggenheim fellow. Formerly, Williams was a contributing writer at The New York Times Magazine and an Easy Chair columnist for Harper's Magazine.

== Early life and education ==
Thomas Chatterton Williams was born on March 26, 1981, in Newark, New Jersey, to a black father, Clarence Williams, and a white mother, Kathleen. Named after the English poet Thomas Chatterton, he was raised in Fanwood, New Jersey, and attended Union Catholic Regional High School in Scotch Plains. Williams graduated from Georgetown University with a bachelor's degree in philosophy. He also completed a master's degree from New York University's Cultural Reporting and Criticism program.

== Career ==
In 2010, Williams released his first book, Losing My Cool: How a Father's Love and 15,000 Books Beat Hip-Hop Culture. The book is a coming-of-age memoir, mirroring Williams's childhood and adolescence in New Jersey to his father's experience in the segregated South. The book combines Williams's personal history with his analysis of the effect of hip-hop culture on black youth.

Williams's second book, Self-Portrait in Black and White: Unlearning Race, was released in 2019. Williams became a 2019 New America Fellow and a Berlin Prize recipient.

In 2020, Williams led the effort to write "A Letter on Justice and Open Debate", an open letter in Harper's Magazine signed by 152 public figures. It criticized what the letter argued was a culture of "intolerance of opposing views".

In January 2024, Williams became a staff writer at The Atlantic. He is also a visiting professor of the humanities and senior fellow at the Hannah Arendt Center for Politics and Humanities at Bard College. He was formerly a contributing writer at The New York Times Magazine and Harper's Magazine.

In 2025, his third book, Summer of Our Discontent, was published. The book critically examines the shifts in social justice ideology, media, and cultural discourse since the summer of 2020.

== Personal life ==
Williams married French journalist and author Valentine Faure in France in 2011. As of 2019, they had two children and lived in Paris. In a July 2026 essay in The Atlantic, Williams wrote that his marriage "came apart several years ago" and that he divides his time between France and the US.

== Bibliography ==
- Losing My Cool: How a Father's Love and 15,000 Books Beat Hip-Hop Culture. The Penguin Press. 2010. ISBN 978-1-59420-263-6.
- Self-Portrait in Black and White: Unlearning Race. W. W. Norton & Company. 2019. ISBN 978-0-393-60886-1.
- Summer of Our Discontent: The Age of Certainty and the Demise of Discourse. Alfred A. Knopf. 2025. ISBN 978-0-593-53440-3.
