= Rachel Monroe =

American author and freelance journalist (born 1982)

- Born: 1982 (age 43–44); Richmond, Virginia, U.S.
- Education: Pomona College (BA); Johns Hopkins University (MFA)
- Occupations: Writer, journalist
- Years active: 2014–present
- Employer: The New Yorker

Rachel Monroe (born September 1982) is an American author, journalist, and contributing writer at The New Yorker. She has written essays for New York magazine, Slate, The New Republic, and The Guardian, including a 2014 profile on Bryce Reed that was listed by The Cut as one of the 56 best pieces of non-fiction by female writers, a 2015 article titled "Have You Ever Thought About Killing Someone?" that was nominated for a 2016 Livingston Award for national reporting and a 2017 article for The Believer that was featured in the anthology The Best American Travel Writing 2018. She is the author of the 2019 non-fiction book Savage Appetites: Four True Stories of Women, Crime, and Obsession, which was named one of the best books of the year by Esquire and Jezebel. Monroe hosted a podcast for BBC Radio 5 in 2022 titled Lost at Sea and contributed a chapter to the 2020 non-fiction anthology Unspeakable Acts: True Tales of Crime, Murder, Deceit, and Obsession.

== Early life ==
Monroe was born in September 1982 in Richmond, Virginia, and grew up in a politically conservative suburb. Her parents were both liberal doctors and Monroe was often encouraged to write as a child, including publishing a family newspaper that she titled "The Monroe Mews". She took a gap year after finishing high school, which she intended to spend travelling but when her flight to Nepal was cancelled after the September 11 attacks, she worked at a bakery and studied Spanish and photography for three months in San Miguel, Mexico.

Monroe then moved to California to attend Pomona College, where she studied under David Foster Wallace. After graduating in 2006, Wallace secured her a job at the Dalkey Archive Press but Monroe turned it down to move to Morocco on a Fulbright Scholarship, where she studied women and literacy and decided to become a writer. The following year, she began studying at Johns Hopkins University in Baltimore, Maryland. Her Master of Fine Arts was in fiction but she realized during the program that she was not interested in writing short stories and instead began writing essays.

After she received her MFA in 2009, Monroe wrote for the Baltimore Fishbowl for several years, a website that had been founded by Susan Dunn, and lived in an artists' warehouse where she made extra money as an adjunct professor and by writing essays. Monroe submitted her first published essay to The Awl in 2012, titled "The Killer Crush: The Horror of Teen Girls, From Columbiners to Beliebers", which covered a community of girls on Tumblr who were infatuated with the Columbine school shooters. She also wrote an essay for the website This Recording and for The New York Times' modern love column. The latter story, "My Back-Seat View of a Great Romance" was performed by Chloë Grace Moretz at the Provincetown Film Festival in 2018. When she left Baltimore, she decided to drive cross-country in 2012, driving through Marfa, Texas, on her way to Los Angeles. Instead of staying in California, she decided to move to Marfa.

== Career ==
Monroe began her freelance journalism career in 2014; her first big story was "Fire Behavior", a profile of Bryce Reed, a local firefighter who came to public attention after the explosion of a fertilizer plant in West, Texas. The story, which drew on Monroe's experience as a volunteer firefighter, was published by Oxford American in 2014. It was listed by The Cut in 2016 as one of the 56 best pieces of non-fiction by female writers and was listed as one of the best essays of the year by Longform and The Atlantic. Over the next two years, she wrote further true crime stories for Outside and Matter – the latter, titled "Have You Ever Thought About Killing Someone?" about Mike Baker's killing of Shannon Roberts in Big Bend National Park was nominated for a 2016 Livingston Award for national reporting. In 2015, she learned the poet Eileen Myles and her partner were moving to Marfa and Monroe interviewed them for New York magazine six months before Myles' partner, Joey Soloway, would publicly announce their relationship and write Myles as a character into the show Transparent.

Monroe has worked as a freelance writer for The New Yorker, New York, Slate, The New Republic, and The Guardian. In April 2017, she wrote a story for the New Yorker about two lifestyle influencers who were part of the #vanlife movement, Emily King and Corey Smith, and in October, she wrote another piece for the magazine about essential oils. That same year, she wrote an article for The Believer about bloggers who write about Charles Manson, titled "Outside the Manson Pinkberry", which was featured in the anthology The Best American Travel Writing 2018. Monroe wrote an article for Esquire in 2018 about the abduction and killing of a Navajo girl, Ashlynne Mike, for the 20th anniversary of the Amber alert. Later that year, she published an article in Outside about the National Park Service's Investigative Services Branch.

Monroe contributed a chapter to the non-fiction anthology Unspeakable Acts: True Tales of Crime, Murder, Deceit, and Obsession edited by Sarah Weinman in 2020, titled "The Perfect Man Who Wasn't". She also worked as a paid consultant on the 2020 Netflix series (Un)well, and appeared in the episode on essential oils. She was hired as a contributing writer for The New Yorker in December 2021. In 2022, she hosted the podcast Lost at Sea for BBC Radio 5, which covered the disappearance of the fisheries observer Keith Davis off the coast of Peru.

=== Savage Appetites ===
On August 20, 2019, Monroe published her debut non-fiction book Savage Appetites: Four True Stories of Women, Crime, and Obsession with Scribner. The essay collection concerns four women who were affected by true crime – the heiress Frances Glessner Lee who created miniature models of crime scenes which became the Nutshell Studies of Unexplained Death; the film director Alisa Statman, who moved to Cielo Drive and became obsessed with the Tate–LaBianca murders, eventually writing a book about it; the landscape architect Lorri Davis who married Damien Echols, one of the West Memphis Three; and Lindsay Souvannarath, who met a young man online with whom she perpetrated the Halifax mass shooting plot. The book received positive reviews and was named one of the best books of the year by Esquire and Jezebel, and received an honorable mention from the Chicago Tribune.
