= Maintenance Phase =

Health and pop culture podcast

- Genre: Feminist; history; health science; culture
- Language: English

Cast and voices
- Hosted by: Aubrey Gordon; Michael Hobbes

Production
- Production: Aubrey Gordon; Michael Hobbes
- Length: 60–90 minutes (approximate)

Publication
- Original release: October 11, 2020
- Updates: Fortnightly

Related
- Website: www.maintenancephase.com

Maintenance Phase is a health science and pop culture podcast that aims to debunk health and wellness-industry myths and discusses anti-fatness in mainstream American culture. It is hosted by Aubrey Gordon and Michael Hobbes. Launched in 2020, the podcast has addressed topics such as the Keto diet, the Presidential Fitness Test, Weight Watchers, and various fad diets and diet self-help books.

== About ==
Aubrey Gordon is an American author and activist who writes about fat liberation. Michael Hobbes is an American journalist and former reporter for the HuffPost. Both of them have written numerous times about the misinformation that originates from the health and wellness industry, as well as anti-fatness in American popular culture.

In each episode, one of the hosts talks to the other about a particular topic and they both discuss and give insight on the subject. The majority of their episodes focus on a particular health product or widely accepted fact that Gordon and Hobbes then discuss.

Many of their episodes focus on debunking scientific misinformation in an easily understandable manner.

The podcast is independently funded, relying on crowd-funding.

== Reception ==
In 2021, the podcast was ranked #1 in the health and fitness category on Apple podcasts, and reached a million downloads in August of that year.

In 2022, Outside regarded it as "the best podcast we've heard about health." Emma Dibdin of the New York Times wrote, "This is essential listening for anyone who's ever been in the grips of the diet industrial complex, and wants to get deprogrammed."

The same year it also won a Webby Award for best podcast series.

== Episodes ==
=== 2020 ===
No.	Title	Guest	Release Date
1	"What's Our Deal?"	None	October 11, 2020
2	"The President's Physical Fitness Test"	None	October 20, 2020
3	"Fen Phen & Redux"	None	October 27, 2020
4	"Snackwell's Cookies"	None	November 3, 2020
5	"Moon Juice"	None	November 10, 2020
6	"The Twinkie Defense"	None	November 17, 2020
7	"Anti-Fat Bias"	None	November 24, 2020

=== 2021 ===
No.	Title	Guest	Release Date
8	"Halo Top Ice Cream"	None	January 5, 2021
9	"The Biggest Loser"	None	January 19, 2021
10	"Snake Oil"	None	February 2, 2021
11	"Dr. Oz"	None	February 16, 2021
12	"The Master Cleanse"	None	March 2, 2021
13	"Weight Watchers"	None	March 16, 2021
14	"Eating Disorders"	Dr. Erin Harrop	March 30, 2021
15	"Olestra"	None	April 13, 2021
16	"Diet Book Deep Dive: Ed McMahon's Slimming Down"	None	April 27, 2021
17	"The Wellness to QAnon Pipeline"	Mike Rothschild	May 11, 2021
18	"Celery Juice"	None	May 25, 2021
19	"Oprah Winfrey & The 'Wagon of Fat'"	Kimberly Springer	June 8, 2021
20	"Oprah Winfrey & 'John of God'"	Kimberly Springer	June 22, 2021
21	"The Keto Diet"	None	July 6, 2021
22	"School Lunches, P-Hacking and the Original 'Pizzagate'"	None	July 20, 2021
23	"The Body Mass Index"	None	August 3, 2021
24	"The Obesity Epidemic"	None	August 17, 2021
25	"The Great Protein Fiasco"	None	August 31, 2021
26	"Marianne Williamson"	None	September 14, 2021
27	"Rachel Hollis Part 1: Hashtag Relatable"	None	September 28, 2021
28	"Rachel Hollis Part 2: Girl, Start Apologizing"	None	October 12, 2021
29	"Diet Book Deep Dive: Angela Lansbury's Positive Moves"	None	October 26, 2021
30	"Is Being Fat Bad For You?"	None	November 16, 2021
31	"Vibrators"	None	November 30, 2021
32	"The 'Sleep Loss Epidemic'"	None	December 14, 2021

=== 2022 ===
No.	Title	Guest	Release Date
33	"Fat Camps"	None	January 4, 2022
34	"Diet Book Deep Dive: The Karl Lagerfeld Diet"	None	January 18, 2022
35	"'Illness Influencer' Belle Gibson"	None	February 1, 2022
36	"Super Size Me"	None	February 15, 2022
37	"Jordan Peterson Part 1: The Carnivore Diet"	None	March 1, 2022
38	"Jordan Peterson Part 2: The Moscow Diaries"	None	March 15, 2022
39	"Bonus: Fad Diets"	None	March 29, 2022
40	"Michael Pollan's The Omnivore's Dilemma"	None	April 5, 2022
41	"Zombie Statistics Spectacular!"	None	April 19, 2022
42	"Diet Book Deep Dive: How To Take 20 Pounds Off Your Man"	None	May 10, 2022
43	"The Trouble With Calories"	None	May 24, 2022
44	"Calorie Menu Labeling"	None	June 7, 2022
45	"The Worm Wars"	None	June 28, 2022
46	"Pete Evans Part 1: The Paleo Way"	None	July 12, 2022
47	"Pete Evans Part 2: COVID & Consequences"	None	July 26, 2022
48	"French Women Don't Get Fat"	None	August 9, 2022
49	"The Scarsdale Diet Murder"	Sarah Marshall	August 23, 2022
50	"BONUS: Moon Juice Taste Test"	None	September 6, 2022
51	"Goop"	None	September 13, 2022
52	"The French Paradox"	None	September 27, 2022
53	"Paul Bragg & The Rise of Apple Cider Vinegar"	None	October 11, 2022
54	"Mini-Sode: The Dr. Oz Campaign"	None	October 18, 2022
55	"The Daily Harvest Food Poisoning Scandal"	None	November 1, 2022
56	"Bonus: Mike's New Podcast!"	None	November 8, 2022
57	"The Food Pyramid"	None	November 15, 2022
58	"Workplace Wellness"	None	December 20, 2022

=== 2023 ===
No.	Title	Guest	Release Date
59	"'Glorifying Obesity' And Other Myths About Fat People"	None	January 3, 2023
60	"Diet Book Deep Dive: Elizabeth Taylor's Elizabeth Takes Off"	None	February 13, 2023
61	"Doctors Have a New Plan for Fat Kids"	None	February 28, 2023
62	"The Instagram Fiber Feud"	None	March 14, 2023
63	"Forks Over Knives: Is a Vegetarian Diet Better For You?"	None	March 28, 2023
64	"The Trouble With Sugar"	None	April 11, 2023
65	"The 10,000 Steps Myth"	None	April 25, 2023
66	"Oprah v. Beef, Part 1: The Rise of 'Veggie Libel'"	None	May 9, 2023
67	"Oprah v. Beef, Part 2: Apocalypse Cow"	None	May 23, 2023
68	"BONUS: The Conservative Diet Books of Yore"	None	June 6, 2023
69	"Brittany Dawn"	None	June 20, 2023
70	"Pilates"	None	July 4, 2023
71	"RFK Jr. and The Rise of the Anti-Vaxx Movement"	None	July 18, 2023
72	"RFK Jr. and The Mainstreaming of the Anti-Vaxx Movement"	None	August 1, 2023
73	"BONUS: Soy Boys"	None	September 12, 2023
74	"Ozempic"	None	October 10, 2023

=== 2024 ===
No.	Title	Guest	Release Date
75	"COVID Conspiracies"	None	March 7, 2024
76	"Jamie Oliver"	None	April 4, 2024
77	"'Rapid Onset Gender Dysphoria' Part 1: The Cooties Theory of Transgender Identity"	None	May 9, 2024
78	"'Rapid Onset Gender Dysphoria' Part 2: Panic! At The Endocrinologist"	None	June 18, 2024
79	"BONUS: Breaking Down the Latest Anti-Trans Victory Lap"	None	July 1, 2024
80	"The Myers-Briggs Personality Test"	None	September 12, 2024
81	"Growing Up Richard Simmons"	None	October 25, 2024
82	"Richard Simmons Isn't Missing"	None	November 21, 2024
83	"BONUS: What's New With RFK Jr.?"	None	December 20, 2024

=== 2025 ===
No.	Title	Guest	Release Date
84	"Blue Zones"	None	January 30, 2025
85	"The Bulletproof Diet"	None	March 26, 2025
86	"BONUS: MAHA's First 90 Days"	None	May 1, 2025
87	"Ultra-Processed Foods"	None	June 3, 2025
88	"Herbalife"	None	July 10, 2025
89	"Seed Oils"	None	August 26, 2025
90	"The Food Babe"	None	September 25, 2025
91	"Raw Milk"	None	November 13, 2025

=== 2026 ===
No.	Title	Guest	Release Date
92	"The Diet Crimes of Metabolife"	None	February 12, 2026
93	"Russell Brand"	None	March 17, 2026
94	"Russell Brand Part 2"	None	April 1, 2026
95	"Tim Ferriss's The 4-Hour Body"	Peter Shamshiri	April 16, 2026
96	"Salt"	None	June 10, 2026
97	"Why Don't We Have a Surgeon General?"	None	July 27, 2026
98	"Susanne Somers Part 1"	None	November 3, 2026
99	"Susanne Somers Part 2"	None	November 11, 2026
