= The Identity Trap =

2023 book

The Identity Trap: A Story of Ideas and Power in Our Time
- First edition cover
- Author: Yascha Mounk
- Language: English
- Genre: Non-fiction
- Publisher: Penguin Press
- Publication date: 2023
- Publication place: United States
- Media type: Print
- Pages: 401
- ISBN: 978-0593493182
- Preceded by: The Great Experiment: Why Diverse Democracies Fall Apart and How They Can Endure

The Identity Trap: A Story of Ideas and Power in Our Time is a 2023 book by political scientist Yascha Mounk, published by Penguin Press. The book critiques the rise of identity-based politics and examines its intellectual roots, tracing the development of ideas from postmodernism, postcolonialism, critical race theory, and intersectionality to their influence on contemporary political and cultural debates.

== Background ==
Yascha Mounk wrote The Identity Trap in response to a shift in progressive politics toward an ideology centered on identity categories such as race, gender, and sexuality. Mounk argues that this new ideology, which he terms the identity synthesis, has diverged from traditional liberal principles of universalism and individual rights.

== Summary ==
Mounk defines the identity synthesis as a set of ideas that prioritize identity categories over individual agency, often advocating for policies and cultural norms that reinforce group-based distinctions. He traces the intellectual lineage of this synthesis to thinkers like Michel Foucault, Edward Said, Gayatri Chakravorty Spivak and Kimberlé Crenshaw, before it reached its present form with Ibram X. Kendi and Robin DiAngelo. He argues that these ideas, initially developed in academic contexts, have increasingly influenced mainstream political and social institutions.

The book critiques the practical consequences of the identity synthesis, contending that it leads to a rigid understanding of social justice that discourages open debate and reinforces social divisions. Mounk contrasts these ideas with liberalism, which he argues offers a more effective framework for addressing inequality while preserving free speech and democratic norms.

== Reception ==
The Identity Trap received a mix of praise and criticism. Supporters, including centrist and conservative commentators, praised Mounk for his defense of liberal values and for challenging what they see as an illiberal turn in progressive politics. Critics, particularly from left-leaning perspectives, argued that Mounk misrepresents the aims of identity-focused movements and underestimates the systemic nature of discrimination.

Felix Haas, writing in World Literature Today, argued that Mounk had made "at least two significant contributions to the current debate": an account on the ideology's origins and a "clear and philosophically liberal critique". He compared the latter favorably to the ad hominem criticism by John McWhorter in Woke Racism and Vivek Ramaswamy. In a critical review for The Guardian, Zoe Williams argued that "Probably the most befuddled element of the entire hypothesis is that Mounk seeks to examine the trap and its escape in isolation, without context."

== See also ==
- Identity politics
- Critical race theory
- Intersectionality
- Liberalism
