= Aubrey Gordon =

Author, podcaster, and activist

- Born: November 9, 1983 (age 42)
- Other name: Your Fat Friend
- Occupations: Author and podcaster
- Website: yourfatfriend.com

Aubrey Gordon (born November 9, 1983), also known as Your Fat Friend, is an author, podcaster, and activist. She writes about fatness, fat acceptance, and anti-fat bias, and her podcast, Maintenance Phase, focuses on the poor science behind health and wellness fads.

== Early life and education ==
Aubrey Gordon was born on November 9, 1983. She was raised in Portland, Oregon. Growing up, she attended a mix of public and private schools. Gordon studied for two years at Portland State University before transferring to Brown University.

== Career ==
Before beginning her writing career, Gordon was an LGBTQ community organizer.

Gordon wrote an essay series anonymously for five years under the pseudonym "Your Fat Friend" about discrimination and anti-fat bias, starting in 2015. Gordon uses the terms "anti-fatness" and "anti-fat" bias, because the term "fatphobia" is unintentionally placing stigma on mental illness. Her work explores methodology and scientific research around fatness, as well as her own lived experience as a fat person. Gordon advocates for fat acceptance.

Gordon wrote a regular column for Self Magazine, has published essays on Medium, and has written for publications including Vox and The New York Times.

Gordon remained anonymous for five years. In October 2020, just before publishing her first book, she revealed her identity and began including her name in bylines. The following month, she published the book What We Don't Talk About When We Talk About Fat, which focuses on fatness and anti-fat bias.

Since October 2020, Gordon and Michael Hobbes have co-hosted the podcast Maintenance Phase. They use the show to debunk the myths and "junk science" behind health, nutrition, and wellness trends, and have discussed topics including popular diets and diet foods, anti-fat bias, and eating disorders. In 2021, the podcast was ranked #1 in the health and fitness category on Apple podcasts, and reached a million downloads in August of that year.

Gordon's second book, “You Just Need to Lose Weight”: And 19 Other Myths About Fat People, was published on January 10, 2023, by Beacon Press. It became a New York Times Best Seller that same month and won a 2024 Pacific Northwest Book Award.

A documentary following Gordon's life over the span of six years, Your Fat Friend, was released in 2023 and directed by Jeanie Finlay. It premiered at the 2023 Tribeca film festival, won the Audience Award at the 2023 Sheffield DocFest and won the Leon Award for Best Documentary Film at the 2023 St. Louis International Film Festival.

== Personal life ==
Gordon describes herself as "very fat". She identifies as queer. As of September 2021, she lived in Portland, Oregon. Gordon also collects diet books.

== Works ==
- Gordon, Aubrey (2020). What We Don't Talk About When We Talk About Fat. Boston: Beacon Press. ISBN 9780807041307.
- Gordon, Aubrey (2023). "You Just Need to Lose Weight": And 19 Other Myths About Fat People. Boston: Beacon Press. ISBN 9780807006474.
