= Sarah Marshall (writer) =

American journalist and podcast host

- Born: Oregon, U.S.
- Occupations: Writer; podcaster
- Known for: Remote Control, You're Wrong About
- Notable work: How Anna Nicole Smith Became America's Punchline, The End of Evil, The Incredible True Story of How Titanic Got Made
- Website: www.remembersarahmarshall.com

Sarah Marshall is an American journalist, writer, and podcaster. She is the host of the modern history podcast You're Wrong About, which discusses incidents from history that the hosts consider as misunderstood or misinterpreted. Marshall has written extensively on other non-fiction subjects including serial killers and Satanic panic.

== Early life ==
Marshall has lived most of her life in Portland, Oregon, including part of her childhood on Sauvie Island. She received both undergraduate and MFA degrees from Portland State University, and has also taught writing at Portland State.

== Career ==
=== Tonya Harding ===
In 2014, Marshall published an 11,000-word essay titled Remote Control in The Believer. The story posits that Tonya Harding was "unfairly vilified" by the media in order to better shape and sell a narrative. Marshall's piece was featured by Time magazine, and her piece is oft-referred to as a defense of a misunderstood woman in history.

As of 2023, Marshall said that she has never met Harding, a fellow Oregon native, despite being in talks with Harding's manager at one point. She stated that meeting Harding is not something she feels is necessary, noting "I don't think [Tonya Harding] would want to meet some woman who has all these thoughts about her career. She seems happy."

=== Podcasts ===
==== Late Night Love Affair ====
Marshall cohosted the series Late Night Love Affair in 2015 with Candace Opper. They discussed various literary topics, including a book review of Manson family member and convicted murderer Susan Atkins' Child of Satan, Child of God.

==== You're Wrong About ====
After her work on the Tonya Harding piece, Marshall was contacted twice by Michael Hobbes, first anonymously via fan-letter while working for a human-rights organization, and later while he worked at The Huffington Post when he wanted to collaborate with Marshall on misunderstood history. Starting in 2018, Marshall and Hobbes co-hosted the podcast You're Wrong About where they discussed misunderstood or misinterpreted events from history. Hobbes left the podcast in 2021 with Marshall continuing as a solo host.

==== You Are Good ====
From August 2020 until February 2026, Marshall co-hosted the podcast You are Good, previously known as Why are Dads, with Alex Steed. In it, Steed and Marshall "attempt[ed] to understand what the hell it means to be the grown children of dads and other dad-like figures. And, as they do with all difficult subject matter, they do so by looking through a pop culture lens."

=== Satanic panic ===
Marshall has frequently discussed the topic of Satanic panic, a moral panic of largely unsubstantiated allegations of child sexual abuse starting in the United States in the 1980s. Marshall has discussed the possibility of writing a book on the matter of the Satanic panic, but has not published anything as of 2025. The Satanic panic was frequently referenced in episodes of You're Wrong About specifically as a means of comparison to absurd or ridiculous events.

A podcast miniseries, The Devil You Know, was launched by Marshall and CBC Radio in 2025. The show centered on the Satanic panic and its rapid spread as a moral panic, as well as the effects of the phenomenon such as the vilification of marginalized groups of people. In addition to her own research being discussed, the show features original interviews of individuals from eyewitness accounts of people impacted to discussions with experts in psychology, sociology, and criminal justice. Marshall discussed flash points of the panic, including the rise in popularity of the book Michelle Remembers as well as the McMartin preschool trial, both of which Marshall notes as significant sources of growth of the Satanic panic.
