= List of British films of 2019 =

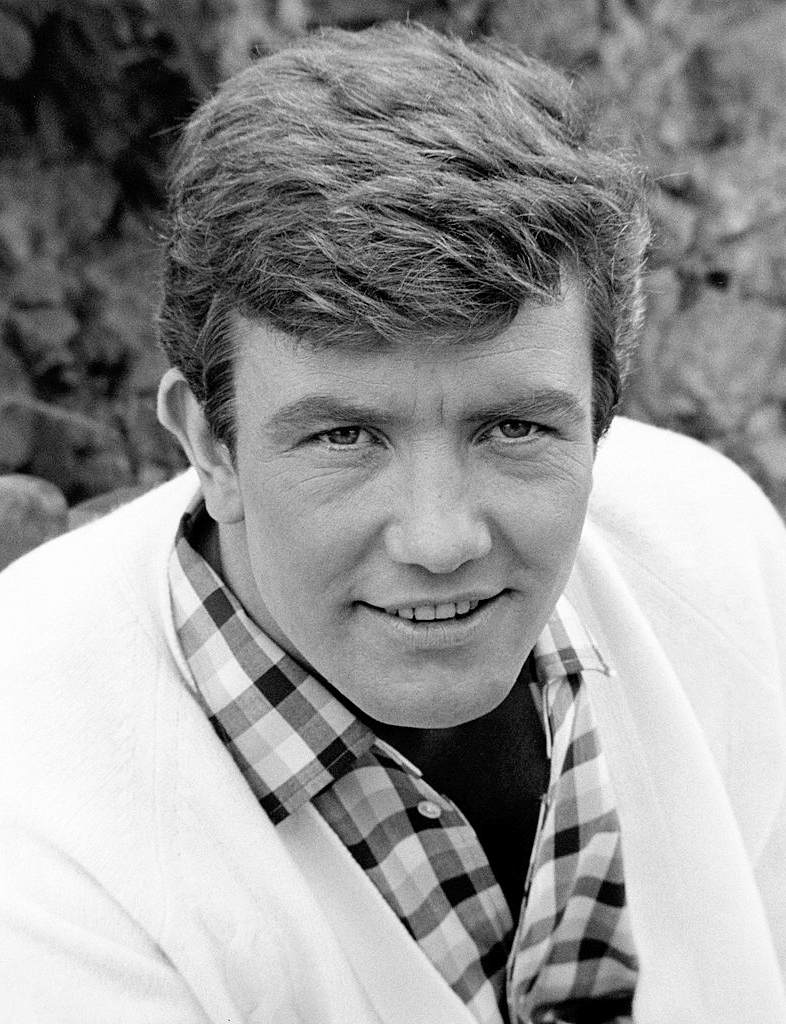
2019 saw the death of Albert Finney.

This article lists feature-length British films and full-length documentaries that have their premiere in 2019 and were at least partly produced by Great Britain or the United Kingdom. It does not feature short films, medium-length films, made-for-TV films, pornographic films, filmed theater, VR films and interactive films. It also does not include films screened in previous years that had official release dates in 2019.

Also included is an overview of five awards ceremonies which are major events in British film: the Academy Awards, British Academy Film Awards, Critics' Choice Awards, Golden Globe Awards and Screen Actors Guild Awards.

== Film premieres ==
=== January – March ===
Opening		Title	Cast and crew	Details	Ref.
J A N U A R Y	16	The Kid Who Would Be King	Director: Joe Cornish; Cast: Louis Ashbourne Serkis, Dean Chaumoo, Tom Taylor, Rhianna Doris, Angus Imrie, Rebecca Ferguson, Patrick Stewart	20th Century Fox	
J A N U A R Y	18	Close	Director: Vicky Jewson; Cast: Noomi Rapace, Sophie Nélisse, Eoin Macken, Indira Varma, Mimi Keene	Netflix (Co-produced by the United States)	
J A N U A R Y	23	Dirty God	Director: Sacha Polak; Cast: Katherine Kelly, Luke White, Kerry Norton	(Co-produced by Belgium, Ireland and Netherlands)	
J A N U A R Y	24	Beats	Director: Brian Welsh; Cast: Laura Fraser, Lorn Macdonald, Cristian Ortega	Based on Beats by Kieran Hurley; Altitude Film Distribution	
J A N U A R Y	24	The Last Tree	Director: Shola Amoo; Cast: Nicholas Pinnock, Denise Black	Picturehouse Entertainment	
J A N U A R Y	25	The Boy Who Harnessed the Wind	Director: Chiwetel Ejiofor; Cast: Chiwetel Ejiofor, Aïssa Maïga, Joseph Marcell	Netflix; Based on The Boy Who Harnessed the Wind by William Kamkwamba	
J A N U A R Y	25	The Hole in the Ground	Director: Lee Cronin; Cast: Seána Kerslake, James Cosmo, Kati Outinen, Simone Kirby, Steve Wall, James Quinn Markey	Vertigo Releasing (Co-produced by Ireland)	
J A N U A R Y	25	The Lodge	Directors: Severin Fiala, Veronika Franz; Cast: Riley Keough, Jaeden Martell, Richard Armitage, Alicia Silverstone	GEM Entertainment (Co-produced by the United States)	
J A N U A R Y	26	The Wolf Hour	Director: Alistar Banks Griffin; Cast: Naomi Watts, Emory Cohen, Jennifer Ehle	GEM Entertainment (Co-produced by the United States)	
J A N U A R Y	26	Wounds	Director: Babak Anvari; Cast: Armie Hammer, Dakota Johnson, Zazie Beetz, Karl Glusman and Brad William Henke	Annapurna Pictures; Based on The Visible Filth by Nathan Ballingrud	
J A N U A R Y	27	Blinded by the Light	Director: Gurinder Chadha; Cast: Viveik Kalra, Hayley Atwell, Nell Williams, Kulvinder Ghir, Meera Ganatra, Aaron Phagura, Dean-Charles Chapman, Jonno Davies	Entertainment One; Based on Greetings From Bury Park by Sarfraz Manzoor	
J A N U A R Y	27	Little Monsters	Director: Abe Forsythe; Cast: Lupita Nyong'o, Alexander England, Josh Gad	Altitude Film Distribution (Co-produced by Australia and the United States)	
J A N U A R Y	27	Midnight Traveler	Director: Hassan Fazili		
J A N U A R Y	27	The Souvenir	Director: Joanna Hogg; Cast: Honor Swinton Byrne, Tom Burke, Tilda Swinton, Ariane Labed, Richard Ayoade, Jaygann Ayeh, Jack McMullen	A24 (Co-produced by the United States)	
J A N U A R Y	28	Animals	Director: Sophie Hyde; Cast: Holliday Grainger, Alia Shawkat, Fra Fee, Dermot Murphy	Based on Animals by Emma Jane Unsworth (Co-produced by Australia and Ireland)	
J A N U A R Y	28	Fighting with My Family	Director: Stephen Merchant; Cast: Florence Pugh, Lena Headey, Nick Frost, Jack Lowden, Dwayne Johnson, Vince Vaughn	Annapurna Pictures; Based on the life of Paige, and The Wrestlers: Fighting with My Family by Max Fisher (Co-produced by the United States)	
J A N U A R Y	28	Official Secrets	Director: Gavin Hood; Cast: Keira Knightley, Matt Smith, Ralph Fiennes, Matthew Goode, Indira Varma, Conleth Hill, Adam Bakri, Tamsin Greig, Rhys Ifans, Hattie Morahan, Ray Panthaki, Angus Wright	Entertainment One; Based on The Spy Who Tried to Stop a War by Marcia & Thomas Mitchel (Co-produced by the United States)	
F E B R U A R Y	7	The Kindness of Strangers	Director: Lone Scherfig; Cast: Andrea Riseborough, Zoe Kazan, Tahar Rahim, Bill Nighy, Caleb Landry Jones, Jay Baruchel	Entertainment One (Co-produced by Canada, France, Germany, Sweden and the United States)	
F E B R U A R Y	9	Bait	Director: Mark Jenkin; Cast: Edward Rowe, Mary Woodvine, Simon Shepherd, Giles King	BFI	
F E B R U A R Y	10	Mr. Jones	Director: Agnieszka Holland; Cast: James Norton, Vanessa Kirby, Peter Sarsgaard, Kenneth Cranham, Joseph Mawle	WestEnd Films; Based on the life of Gareth Jones (Co-produced by Poland and Ukraine)	
F E B R U A R Y	26	The Aftermath	Director: James Kent; Cast: Keira Knightley, Alexander Skarsgård, Jason Clarke, Roman Reigns	Fox Searchlight Pictures; Based on The Aftermath by Rhidian Brook (Co-produced by Germany and the United States)	
F E B R U A R Y	27	Lancaster Skies	Director: Callum Burn; Cast: Jeffrey Mundell, David Dobson, Kris Saddler, Joanne Gale, Vin Hawke	Kaleidoscope Film Distribution	
F E B R U A R Y	28	Last Breath	Director: Richard da Costa, Alex Parkinson; Cast: Jeffrey Mundell, David Dobson, Kris Saddler, Joanne Gale, Vin Hawke	Dogwoof (Co-produced by Belgium and Sweden)	
M A R C H	9	Pink Wall	Director: Tom Cullen; Cast: Tatiana Maslany, Jay Duplass, Sule Rimi, Ruth Ollman, Sarah Ovens, T.J. Richardson, Kyle Lima	Pinpoint Films	
M A R C H	10	The Warrior Queen of Jhansi	Director: Swati Bhise; Cast: Devika Bhise, Rupert Everett, Jodhi May, Nathaniel Parker, Derek Jacobi	Based on the life of Rani Lakshmibai	
M A R C H	11	The Day Shall Come	Director: Chris Morris; Cast: Marchánt Davis, Anna Kendrick, Danielle Brooks, Denis O'Hare, Jim Gaffigan, Miles Robbins	(Co-produced by the United States)	
M A R C H	11	For Sama	Directors: Waad Al-Kateab, Edward Watts	Republic Film Distribution (Co-produced by Syria and the United States)	
M A R C H	15	Fisherman's Friends	Director: Chris Foggin; Cast: Daniel Mays, James Purefoy, David Hayman, Dave Johns, Sam Swainsbury, Tuppence Middleton, Noel Clarke	Entertainment Film Distributors	
M A R C H	28	Princess Emmy	Piet De Rycker	Kaleidoscope Film Distribution	
M A R C H	29	Dumbo	Director: Tim Burton; Cast: Colin Farrell, Michael Keaton, Danny DeVito, Eva Green, Alan Arkin	Walt Disney Studios Motion Pictures (Co-produced by Canada, Australia and the United States)	

=== April – June ===
Opening		Title	Cast and crew	Details	Ref.
A P R I L	11	A Bump Along the Way	Director: Shelly Love; Cast: Bronagh Gallagher, Lola Petticrew, Mary Moulds, Dan Gordon, Zara Devlin	Element Pictures (Produced by Northern Ireland)	
A P R I L	19	Once Upon a Time in London	Director: Simon Rumley; Cast: Leo Gregory, Terry Stone, Holly Earl, Dominic Keating, Geoff Bell, Jamie Foreman	Signature Entertainment; Based on the lives of Billy Hill and Jack Comer	
A P R I L	25	Roads	Director: Sebastian Schipper; Cast: Fionn Whitehead, Stéphane Bak, Moritz Bleibtreu, Ben Chaplin	StudioCanal (Co-produced by France and Germany)	
A P R I L	28	Nomad: In the Footsteps of Bruce Chatwin	Director: Werner Herzog; Cast: Fionn Whitehead, Stéphane Bak, Moritz Bleibtreu, Ben Chaplin	Based on the life of Bruce Chatwin; BBC	
M A Y	1	XY Chelsea	Director: Tim Travers Hawkins; Cast: Chelsea Manning	Dogwoof; Based on the life of Chelsea Manning	
M A Y	4	Yesterday	Director: Danny Boyle; Cast: Himesh Patel, Lily James, Kate McKinnon, Ed Sheeran, Ana de Armas, Lamorne Morris, Sophia Di Martino	Universal Pictures	
M A Y	10	The Corrupted	Director: Ron Scalpello; Cast: Sam Claflin, Charlie Murphy, Naomi Ackie	Entertainment Film Distributors	
M A Y	10	Poms	Director: Zara Hayes; Cast: Diane Keaton, Pam Grier, Jacki Weaver, Celia Weston, Alisha Boe, Rhea Perlman	STX Entertainment (Co-produced by United States)	
M A Y	16	Rocketman	Director: Dexter Fletcher; Cast: Taron Egerton, Jamie Bell, Richard Madden, Bryce Dallas Howard, Charlie Rowe, Gemma Jones	Paramount Pictures; Based on the life of Elton John (Co-produced by United States)	
M A Y	16	Sorry We Missed You	Director: Ken Loach; Cast: Kris Hitchen, Debbie Honeywood, Katie Proctor, Rhys Stone	(Co-produced by Belgium and France)	
M A Y	17	First Love	Director: Takashi Miike; Cast: Masataka Kubota, Nao Ōmori, Shota Sometani, Sakurako Konishi, Becky, Takahiro Miura	HanWay Films (Co-produced by Japan)	
M A Y	17	Little Joe	Director: Jessica Hausner; Cast: Emily Beecham, Ben Whishaw, Leanne Best, Lindsay Duncan	(Co-produced by Austria and Germany)	
M A Y	19	Diego Maradona	Director: Asif Kapadia	Altitude Film Distribution; Based on the life of Diego Maradona	
M A Y	21	Once Upon a Time in Hollywood	Director: Quentin Tarantino; Cast: Leonardo DiCaprio, Brad Pitt, Margot Robbie, Mike Moh, Al Pacino, Dakota Fanning, Damian Lewis, Bruce Dern, Emile Hirsch, Scoot McNairy, Luke Perry, Samantha Robinson, Damon Herriman, Austin Butler, Lena Dunham, Maya Hawke	Columbia Pictures Corporation (Co-produced by United States)	
M A Y	24	Avengement	Director: Jesse V. Johnson; Cast: Scott Adkins, Craig Fairbrass, Thomas Turgoose	Samuel Goldwyn Films	
J U N E	7	Pavarotti	Director: Ron Howard	HanWay Films; Based in the life of Luciano Pavarotti (Co-produced by United States)	
J U N E	7	Liam Gallagher: As It Was	Director: Charlie Lightening, Gavin Fitzgerald	Screen Media; Documentary about English singer Liam Gallagher	
J U N E	21	The Flood	Director: Anthony Woodley; Cast: Lena Headey, Ivanno Jeremiah, Mandip Gill, Jack Gordon, Peter Singh, Arsher Ali, Iain Glen	Curzon Artificial Eye	
J U N E	23	Balance, Not Symmetry	Director: Jamie Adams; Cast: Laura Harrier, Bria Vinaite, Lily Newmark, Freya Mavor, Tamsin Egerton, Kate Dickie, Scott Miller	Pinpoint (Co-produced by United States)	
J U N E	24	Bittersweet Symphony	Director: Jamie Adams; Cast: Suki Waterhouse, Jennifer Grey, Poppy Delevingne, Craig Roberts, Griffin Dunne	Pinpoint	
J U N E	28	Carmilla	Director: Emily Harris; Cast: Jessica Raine, Hannah Rae, Devrim Lingnau, Tobias Menzies, Greg Wise	Altitude Film; Based on Carmilla by Sheridan Le Fanu	
J U N E	28	Killers Anonymous	Director: Martin Owen; Cast: Gary Oldman, Jessica Alba, Tommy Flanagan, Elliot James Langridge, Rhyon Nicole Brown, Suki Waterhouse, Michael Socha	(Co-produced by United States)	
J U N E	29	Monsoon	Director: Hong Khaou; Cast: Henry Golding, Parker Sawyers, David Tran, Molly Harris, Lâm Vissay, Edouard Leo	Peccadillo Pictures (Co-produced by Vietnam)	
J U N E	30	Mrs Lowry & Son	Director: Adrian Noble; Cast: Vanessa Redgrave, Timothy Spall, Stephen Lord, Wendy Morgan	Vertigo Films; Based on the life of L.S. Lowry	

=== July – September ===
Opening		Title	Cast and crew	Details	Ref.
J U L Y	20	Shooting Clerks	Director: Christopher Downie; Cast: Kevin Smith, Mark Frost, Brian O'Halloran, Matthew Postlethwaite, Chris Bain, Scott Schiaffo, Harry Mitchell, Jason Mewes	Based on Kevin Smith's making of Clerks (Co-produced by Canada and the United States)	
J U L Y	21	A Good Woman Is Hard to Find	Director: Abner Pastoll; Cast: Sarah Bolger, Edward Hogg, Andrew Simpson, Jane Brennan	Signature Entertainment (Co-produced by Belgium)	
J U L Y	26	Horrible Histories: The Movie – Rotten Romans	Director: Dominic Brigstocke; Cast:Sebastian Croft, Emilia Jones, Nick Frost, Craig Roberts, Kim Cattrall, Kate Nash, Rupert Graves	Altitude Film Distribution; Horrible Histories by Terry Deary	
J U L Y	28	Bombay Rose	Director: Gitanjali Rao; Cast: Cyli Khare, Amit Deondi, Anurag Kashyap, Makrand Deshpande, Geetanjali Kulkarni, Shishir Sharma, Virendra Saxena, Amardeep Jha	(Co-produced by France, India and Qatar)	
A U G U S T	14	Days of the Bagnold Summer	Director: Simon Bird; Cast: Monica Dolan, Earl Cave, Tamsin Greig, Rob Brydon	Altitude Films; Based on Days of the Bagnold Summer by Joff Winterhart	
A U G U S T	16	47 Meters Down: Uncaged	Director: Johannes Roberts; Cast: John Corbett, Nia Long, Sophie Nelisse, Corinne Foxx, Sistine Stallone, Brianne Tju, Davi Santos, Khylin Rhambo	Entertainment Studios Motion Pictures; Sequel to 47 Meters Down (Co-produced by the United States)	
A U G U S T	29	Marriage Story	Director: Noah Baumbach; Cast: Scarlett Johansson, Adam Driver, Laura Dern, Alan Alda, Ray Liotta	Netflix (Co-produced by the United States)	
A U G U S T	30	The Aeronauts	Director: Tom Harper; Cast: Eddie Redmayne, Felicity Jones, Phoebe Fox, Vincent Perez, Anne Reid	Entertainment One (Co-produced by the United States)	
A U G U S T	30	The Informer	Director: Andrea Di Stefano; Cast: Joel Kinnaman, Rosamund Pike, Clive Owen, Common, Ana de Armas	Warner Bros. Pictures; Based on Three Seconds by Roslund/Hellström (Co-produced by the United States)	
A U G U S T	30	Judy	Director: Rupert Goold; Cast: Renée Zellweger, Rufus Sewell, Finn Wittrock, Jessie Buckley, Michael Gambon	Pathé; Based on End of the Rainbow by Peter Quilter (Co-produced by the United States)	
A U G U S T	30	Seberg	Director: Benedict Andrews; Cast: Kristen Stewart, Jack O'Connell, Anthony Mackie, Margaret Qualley, Colm Meaney, Zazie Beetz, Vince Vaughn	Amazon Studios; Based on the life of Jean Seberg (Co-produced by the United States)	
A U G U S T	30	Tell Me Who I Am	Director: Ed Perkins; Cast: Alex Lewis, Marcus Lewis	Netflix; Based on the lives of Alex and Marcus Lewis	
A U G U S T	31	Citizen K	Director: Alex Gibney	About Mikhail Khodorkovsky	
A U G U S T	31	Coup 53	Director: Taghi Amirani; Cast: Ralph Fiennes	Based on the 1953 Iranian coup d'état (Co-produced by Iran)	
A U G U S T	31	Rare Beasts	Director: Billie Piper; Cast: Billie Piper, Leo Bill, Lily James, David Thewlis, Kerry Fox		
A U G U S T	31	The Two Popes	Director: Fernando Meirelles; Cast: Jonathan Pryce, Anthony Hopkins, Sidney Cole, Lisandro Fiks	Netflix; Based on The Pope by Anthony McCarten (Co-produced by Argentina, Italy and the United States)	
S E P T E M B E R	4	Moffie	Director: Oliver Hermanus; Cast: Kai Luke Brümmer, Ryan de Villiers, Matthew Vey, Stefan Vermaak, Hilton Pelser, Wynand Ferreira, Hendrick Nieuwoudt	Based on Moffie by André Carl van der Merwe (Co-produced by South Africa)	
S E P T E M B E R	5	The Personal History of David Copperfield	Director: Armando Iannucci; Cast: Dev Patel, Tilda Swinton, Hugh Laurie, Aneurin Barnard, Ben Whishaw, Morfydd Clark, Peter Capaldi, Gwendoline Christie, Benedict Wong, Paul Whitehouse	GEM Entertainment; Based on David Copperfield by Charles Dickens (Co-produced by the United States)	
S E P T E M B E R	5	Rocks	Director: Sarah Gavron; Cast: Bukky Bukray, Kosar Ali, D'angelou Osei Kissiedu	Fable Pictures	
S E P T E M B E R	5	Sea Fever	Director: Neasa Hardiman; Cast: Hermione Corfield, Dougray Scott, Connie Nielsen	Signature Pictures	
S E P T E M B E R	6	Hope Gap	Director: William Nicholson; Cast: Annette Bening, Bill Nighy, Josh O'Connor, Aiysha Hart	Roadside Attractions; Based on The Retreat from Moscow by William Nicholson	
S E P T E M B E R	6	Military Wives	Director: Peter Cattaneo; Cast: Kristin Scott Thomas, Sharon Horgan, Jason Flemyng	Loosely based on the Military Wives Choir; Bleecker Street	
S E P T E M B E R	6	Roger Waters: Us + Them	Directors: Sean Evans, Roger Waters; Cast: Roger Waters, Dave Kilminster, Jon Carin, Jonathan Wilson, Joey Waronker, Gus Seyffert, Lucius (Holly Laessig, Jess Wolfe), Bo Koster, Ian Ritchie	Us + Them Production Limited	
S E P T E M B E R	7	Greed	Director: Michael Winterbottom; Cast: Steve Coogan, Stephen Fry, Asa Butterfield, David Mitchell, Isla Fisher, Shirley Henderson, Sophie Cookson	Picturehouse Cinemas (Co-produced by the United States)	
S E P T E M B E R	7	How to Build a Girl	Director: Coky Giedroyc; Cast: Beanie Feldstein, Alfie Allen, Paddy Considine, Emma Thompson, Chris O'Dowd	Lionsgate; Based on How to Build a Girl by Caitlin Moran (Co-produced by the United States)	
S E P T E M B E R	7	My Zoe	Director: Julie Delpy; Cast: Julie Delpy, Gemma Arterton, Daniel Bruhl, Richard Armitage	Focus Features (Co-produced by France and Germany)	
S E P T E M B E R	7	Sweetness in the Belly	Director: Zeresenay Berhane Mehari; Cast: Dakota Fanning, Wunmi Mosaku, Kunal Nayyar, Yahya Abdul-Mateen II	GEM Entertainment; Based on Sweetness in the Belly by Camilla Gibb (Co-produced by Canada and Ireland)	
S E P T E M B E R	8	Calm With Horses	Director: Nick Rowland; Cast: Cosmo Jarvis, Niamh Algar, Barry Keoghan, Ned Dennehy	Altitude Film Distribution (Co-produced by Ireland)	
S E P T E M B E R	8	Saint Maud	Director: Rose Glass; Cast: Jennifer Ehle, Morfydd Clark, Turlough Convery, Lily Knight, Lily Frazer	StudioCanal	
S E P T E M B E R	8	The Song of Names	Director: François Girard; Cast: Tim Roth, Clive Owen	GEM Entertainment; Based on The Song of Names by Norman Lebrecht	
S E P T E M B E R	9	Downton Abbey	Director: Michael Engler; Cast: Hugh Bonneville, Laura Carmichael, Michelle Dockery, Joanne Froggatt, Elizabeth McGovern, Maggie Smith, Penelope Wilton	Universal Pictures International; Based on Downton Abbey by Julian Fellowes (Co-produced by the United States)	
S E P T E M B E R	9	Ordinary Love	Directors: Lisa Barros D'Sa, Glenn Leyburn; Cast: Liam Neeson, Lesley Manville, David Wilmot, Amit Shah	Focus Features (Co-produced by Ireland)	
S E P T E M B E R	11	Dirt Music	Director: Gregor Jordan; Cast: Garrett Hedlund, Kelly Macdonald, David Wenham	Based on Dirt Music by Tim Winton (Co-produced by Australia)	
S E P T E M B E R	11	True History of the Kelly Gang	Director: Justin Kurzel; Cast: George MacKay, Russell Crowe, Nicholas Hoult, Essie Davis, Charlie Hunnam	Film & TV House; Based on True History of the Kelly Gang by Peter Carey (Co-produced by Australia)	
S E P T E M B E R	14	Radioactive	Director: Marjane Satrapi; Cast: Rosamund Pike, Sam Riley, Anya Taylor-Joy, Aneurin Barnard, Simon Russell Beale	Amazon Studios; Based on Radioactive: Marie & Pierre Curie: A Tale of Love and Fallout by Lauren Redniss	
S E P T E M B E R	22	A Shaun the Sheep Movie: Farmageddon	Director: Richard Starzak; Cast: Justin Fletcher, John Sparkes, Kate Harbour, Richard Webber, Simon Greenall, Emma Tate, Andy Nyman	StudioCanal; Based on Shaun the Sheep by Nick Park; Sequel to Shaun the Sheep Movie	

=== October – December ===
Opening		Title	Cast and crew	Details	Ref.
O C T O B E R	4	Make Up	Director: Claire Oakley; Cast: Molly Windsor, Joseph Quinn, Stefanie Martini, Lisa Palfrey, Theo Barklem-Biggs	Curzon Film Distributors	
O C T O B E R	8	Eternal Beauty	Director: Craig Roberts; Cast: Sally Hawkins, David Thewlis, Billie Piper, Penelope Wilton, Alice Lowe, Robert Aramayo	GEM Entertainment (Co-produced by United States)	
O C T O B E R	8	Nocturnal	Director: Nathalie Biancheri		
O C T O B E R	10	Fanny Lye Deliver'd	Director: Thomas Clay; Cast: Maxine Peake, Charles Dance, Freddie Fox, Tanya Reynolds, Peter McDonald	(Co-produced by Germany)	
O C T O B E R	11	Muscle	Director: Gerard Johnson; Cast: Craig Fairbrass, Cavan Clerkin, Sinead Matthews, Polly Maberly, Lorraine Burroughs	Stigma Films	
O C T O B E R	11	The Street	Director: Zed Nelson		
N O V E M B E R	1	Arctic Dogs	Director: Aaron Woodley; Cast: Jeremy Renner, Heidi Klum, James Franco, John Cleese, Omar Sy, Michael Madsen, Laurie Holden, Anjelica Huston, Alec Baldwin	Signature Entertainment (Co-produced by Canada and the United States)	
N O V E M B E R	8	Last Christmas	Director: Paul Feig; Cast: Emilia Clarke, Henry Golding, Emma Thompson, Michelle Yeoh	Universal Pictures (Co-produced by the United States)	
N O V E M B E R	10	He Dreams of Giants	Director: Keith Fulton, Louis Pepe; Cast: Terry Gilliam, Johnny Depp, Jean Rochefort	Based on Terry Gilliam's making of The Man Who Killed Don Quixote	
N O V E M B E R	15	Klaus	Director: Sergio Pablos; Cast: Jason Schwartzman, J. K. Simmons, Rashida Jones, Will Sasso, Neda Margrethe Labba, Sergio Pablos, Norm Macdonald, Joan Cusack		
N O V E M B E R	22	Blue Story	Director: Rapman; Cast: Stephen Odubola, Michael Ward, Khali Best, Karla-Simone Spence, Eric Kofi-Abrefa	Paramount Pictures	
N O V E M B E R	22	The Courier	Director: Zackary Adler; Cast: Olga Kurylenko, Gary Oldman, Dermot Mulroney, William Moseley, Amit Shah, Craig Conway, Alicia Agneson	Signature Entertainment (Co-produced by the United States)	
D E C E M B E R	2	The Last Faust	Director: Philipp Humm; Cast: Steven Berkoff, Martin Hancock, Glyn Dilley, Yvonne Mai, Scarlett Melish Wilson, Isabella Bliss	The Humm Collection; Based on Faust by Johann Wolfgang von Goethe	
D E C E M B E R	3	The Gentlemen	Director: Guy Ritchie; Cast: Matthew McConaughey, Charlie Hunnam, Henry Golding, Michelle Dockery, Jeremy Strong, Eddie Marsan, Colin Farrell, Hugh Grant	Entertainment Film Distributors (Co-produced by the United States)	
D E C E M B E R	4	1917	Director: Sam Mendes; Cast: George MacKay, Dean-Charles Chapman, Colin Firth, Mark Strong, Benedict Cumberbatch, Richard Madden, Andrew Scott	Universal Pictures (Co-produced by the United States)	
D E C E M B E R	16	Cats	Director: Tom Hooper; Cast: Francesca Hayward, Jennifer Hudson, James Corden, Jason Derulo, Taylor Swift, Idris Elba, Rebel Wilson, Ian McKellen, Judi Dench	Universal Pictures; Based on Cats by Andrew Lloyd Webber and Old Possum's Book of Practical Cats by T.S. Eliot (Co-produced by the United States)	

=== Other premieres ===
Title	Director	Release date	Ref.
90 Minutes	Simon Baker	19 March 2019	
Abatement	Gary Rogers	1 August 2019 (DVD and Blu-ray premiere)	
Amaryllis	Thomas Lawes	20 September 2019 (Crossing the Screen Film Festival)	
The Amber Light	Adam Park	22 June 2019 (Edinburgh International Film Festival)	
An Accidental Studio	Bill Jones, Kim Leggatt	29 April 2019 (BCN Film Fest)	
Are You Proud?	Ashley Joiner	28 February 2019 (Glasgow Film Festival)	
Around The Sun	Oliver Krimpas	4 April 2019 (Cleveland International Film Festival)	
Baghdad in My Shadows	Samir	10 August 2019 (Locarno Film Festival)	
Best Before Death	Paul Duane	26 June 2019 (Edinburgh International Film Festival)	
Beyond the Beach – The Hell and the Hope	Graeme Alistair Scott, Buddy Squires	3 September 2019 (Venice Film Festival)	
The Big Meeting	Daniel Draper	6 September 2019	
The Birdcatcher	Ross Clarke	29 March 2019 (Garden State Film Festival)	
The Black Forest	Ruth Platt	21 June 2019 (Edinburgh International Film Festival)	
Boyz in the Wood	Ninian Doff	8 March 2019	
Burning Men	Jeremy Wooding	1 March 2019	
Busby	Joe Pearlman	8 November 2019	
The Capote Tapes	Ebs Burnough	7 September 2019 (Toronto International Film Festival)	
The Changin' Times of Ike White	Daniel Vernon	13 September 2019 (Camden International Film Festival)	
Chasing Perfect	Helena Coan	20 May 2019	
Connect	Marilyn Edmond	23 February 2019 (Glasgow Film Festival)	
Cordelia	Adrian Shergold	25 September 2019 (Dinard Film Festival)	
County Lines	Henry Blake	8 October 2019 (London Film Festival)	
Cosmos	Elliot Weaver, Zander Weaver	14 July 2019 (UK premiere)	
Cosmos Within Us	Tupac Martir	25 August 2019 (Venice Film Festival)	
Crucible of the Vampire	Iain Ross-McNamee	1 February 2019	
The Cure: Anniversary 1978–2018 Live in Hyde Park	Tim Pope	11 July 2019	
Dark Encounter	Carl Strathie	23 August 2019 (FrightFest)	
Darkness Visible	Neil Biswas	8 February 2019 (Los Angeles, California)	
Dead Good	Rehana Rose	May 2019	
Demon Eye	Ryan Simons	26 February 2019 (Fantasporto – 39.º Festival Internacional de Cinema do Porto)	
Denmark	Adrian Shergold	26 September 2019 (Calgary Film Festival)	
The Dirty War on the National Health Service	John Pilger	29 November 2019	
A Dog Called Money	Seamus Murphy	10 February 2019 (Berlin International Film Festival)	
The Drifters	Ben Bond	19 October 2019 (São Paulo International Film Festival)	
The Easy Bit	Tom Webb	28 September 2019 (Raindance Film Festival)	
The Edge	Barney Douglas	22 July 2019	
Eve	Rory Kindersley	19 October 2019 (San Diego International Film Festival)	
Everything – The Real Thing Story	Simon Sheridan	24 October 2019	
Excursion	Martin Grof	20 April 2019 (internet)	
The Fear of Looking Up	Konstantinos Koutsoliotas	2 June 2019 (Fantaspoa International Film Festival)	
Final Ascent: The Legend of Hamish MacInnes	Robbie Fraser	10 May 2019	
For Love or Money	Mark Murphy	15 March 2019 (internet)	
Force of Nature Natalia	Gerald Fox	6 June 2019	
The Gasoline Thieves	Edgar Nito	25 April 2019 (Tribeca Film Festival)	
Gorillaz: Reject False Icons	Denholm Hewlett	16 December 2019	
A Guide To Second Date Sex	Rachel Hirons	31 October 2019 (British Film Festival)	
Harry Birrell Presents Films of Love and War	Matt Pinder	24 February 2019 (Glasgow Film Festival)	
Here For Life	Andrea Luka Zimmerman, Adrian Jackson	10 June 2019	
Home	Jen Randall	18 October 2019	
Home	Scott Altman	27 October 2019	
Horizon	Paul Dudbridge, Simon Pearce	17 February 2019 (UK premiere)	
How to Fake a War	Rudolph Herzog	22 June 2019 (Edinburgh International Film Festival)	
Hurt By Paradise	Greta Bellamacina	20 June 2019 (Edinburgh International Film Festival)	
I Am (Not) a Monster	Nelly Ben Hayoun	10 October 2019 (London Film Festival)	
Ibiza: The Silent Movie	Julien Temple	5 July 2019	
In the Line of Duty	Steven C. Miller	15 November 2019	
Invasion Planet Earth	Simon Cox	5 December 2019	
Kat and the Band	E.E. Hegarty	13 July 2020	
Krabi, 2562	Ben Rivers, Anocha Suwichakornpong	8 August 2019 (Locarno Film Festival)	
Leonardo: The Works	Phil Grabsky	29 October 2019	
Liam: As It Was	Gavin Fitzgerald, Charlie Lightening	6 June 2019	
Lie Low	Jamie Noel	3 May 2019	
Lost Lives	Michael Hewitt, Dermot Lavery	11 October 2019 (London Film Festival)	
Louisa: An Amazing Adventure	Ken Blakey	11 January 2019	
Love Type D	Sasha Collington	21 June 2019 (Edinburgh International Film Festival)	
Lynn + Lucy	Fyzal Boulifa	22 September 2019 (San Sebastián Film Festival)	
Making Noise Quietly	Dominic Dromgoole	19 July 2019	
Masters of Love	Matt Roberts	28 June 2019 (Edinburgh International Film Festival)	
A Moon for My Father	Mania Akbari, Douglas White	25 March 2019 (CPH:DOX)	
Nuclear	Catherine Linstrum	11 October 2019 (Warsaw Film Festival)	
On the President's Orders	James Jones, Olivier Sarbil	25 March 2019 (CPH:DOX)	
Our Ladies	Michael Caton-Jones	4 October 2019 (London Film Festival)	
Prophecy	Charlie Paul	27 April 2019 (Hot Docs)	
Red Devil	Savvas D. Michael	18 November 2019	
Return to Podor	Kevin Macdonald	2 September 2018 (Telluride Film Festival)	
Rialto	Peter Mackie Burns	2 September 2019 (Venice Film Festival)	
Rise of the Footsoldier: Marbella (a.k.a. Rise of the Footsoldier: The Spanish Heist)	Andrew Loveday	8 November 2019	
Romantic Comedy	Elizabeth Sankey	25 January 2019 (International Film Festival Rotterdam)	
Rose Plays Julie	Joe Lawlor, Christine Molloy	3 October 2019 (London Film Festival)	
Run	Scott Graham	26 April 2019 (Tribeca Film Festival)	
Rupert, Rupert & Rupert	Tom Sands	26 April 2019	
Scheme Birds	Ellen Fiske, Ellinor Hallin	26 April 2019 (Tribeca Film Festival)	
Schemers	Dave McLean	29 June 2019 (Edinburgh International Film Festival)	
Seahorse	Jeanie Finlay	26 April 2019	
Show Me The Picture: The Story of Jim Marshall	Alfred George Bailey	15 March 2019 (South by Southwest Film Festival)	
Solidarity	Lucy Parker	7 September 2019 (Open City Documentary Festival)	
Somebody Up There Likes Me	Mike Figgis	12 October 2019 (London Film Festival)	
Soul Journey	Marco Della Fonte	1 May 2019	
The Spy Who Fell to Earth	Tom Meadmore	1 April 2019	
StarDog and TurboCat	Ben Smith	6 December 2019	
Strike	Trevor Hardy	11 May 2019	
Superpower Dogs	Daniel Ferguson	15 March 2019	
Tales From the Lodge	Abigail Blackmore	9 March 2019 (South by Southwest Film Festival)	
Trick or Treat	Edward Boase	25 October 2019	
Van Gogh & Japan	David Bickerstaff	4 June 2019	
Walking with Shadows	Aoife O'Kelly	9 October 2019 (London Film Festival)	
White Riot	Rubika Shah	5 October 2019 (London Film Festival)	
Young Picasso	Phil Grabsky	5 February 2019	

=== Culturally British films ===
The following list comprises films not produced by Great Britain or the United Kingdom but is strongly associated with British culture. The films in this list should fulfill at least 3 of the following criteria:

- The film is adapted from a British source material.
- The story is at least partially set in the United Kingdom.
- The film was at least partially shot in the United Kingdom.
- Many of the film's cast and crew members are British.

Title	Country of origin	Adaptation	Story Setting	Film Locations	British Cast and Crew
Casanova, Last Love	France		London, England	London, United Kingdom	Stacy Martin, Hayley Carmichael, Catherine Bailey, Nathan Willcocks
Fast & Furious Presents: Hobbs & Shaw	United States		London, England	London, Glasgow and North Yorkshire, United Kingdom	Jason Statham, Vanessa Kirby, Idris Elba, Eddie Marsan, Dominic Hyman (supervising art director), Lucy Bevan (casting director), Simon Rafferty (special effects)
The Good Liar	United States	The Good Liar by Nicholas Searle	England	London, United Kingdom	Ian McKellen, Helen Mirren, Jim Carter, Mark Lewis Jones, Lucy Bevan (casting director), John Stevenson (production designer), Keith Madden (costume designer)
Hellboy	United States		England	Somerset, United Kingdom	Ian McShane, Sophie Okonedo, Stephen Graham, Neil Marshall (director), Benjamin Wallfisch (composer), Stephanie Collie (costume designer), Paul Kirby (production design)
The King	Australia; United States	Henry IV, Part 1, Henry IV, Part 2, Henry V by William Shakespeare	England	Lincolnshire, United Kingdom	Robert Pattinson, Sean Harris, Tom Glynn-Carney, Dean-Charles Chapman, Des Hamilton (casting director), Matthew Hywel-Davies (supervising art director)
Liberté: A Call to Spy	United States	The lives of Vera Atkins and Noor Inayat Khan	England		Linus Roache, Samuel Roukin
Men in Black: International	United States		London, England	London, United Kingdom	Liam Neeson, Rafe Spall, Emma Thompson, Stuart Dryburgh (cinematography), DNEG (visual effects)
Maleficent: Mistress of Evil	United States		Perceforest's England	Buckinghamshire, United Kingdom	Sam Riley, Imelda Staunton, Juno Temple, Lesley Manville, Chiwetel Ejiofor, Henry Braham (cinematographer)
The Professor and the Madman	Ireland; United States	The Surgeon of Crowthorne by Simon Winchester	Berkshire, England	Oxford, United Kingdom	Natalie Dormer, Eddie Marsan, Jennifer Ehle, Jeremy Irvine, Steve Coogan, John Boorman (writer), Daniel Hubbard (casting)
The Queen's Corgi	Belgium	Queen Elizabeth II's royal corgis	London, England		Julie Walters, Ray Winstone, Tom Courtenay, Johnny Smith (writer)
Robert the Bruce	United States	The life of Robert the Bruce	Scotland		Angus Macfadyen, Jared Harris
Spider-Man: Far From Home	United States		London, England	Hertfordshire and London, United Kingdom	Tom Holland, Peter Bankole, Chris Munro (sound engineer), Grant Armstrong (supervising art director), Helena Holmes (art director)
Tolkien	United States	The life of J. R. R. Tolkien	London, England	Liverpool and Manchester, United Kingdom	Nicholas Hoult, Lily Collins, Tom Glynn-Carney, Anthony Boyle, Craig Roberts, Derek Jacobi, Stephen Beresford (writer), Grant Montgomery (production designer)

Judy and Punch fulfills two of the above criteria as it is based on the English tradition of puppetry and is set in 17th century England. However, it was filmed entirely in Australia with Australian cast and crew.

== British winners ==
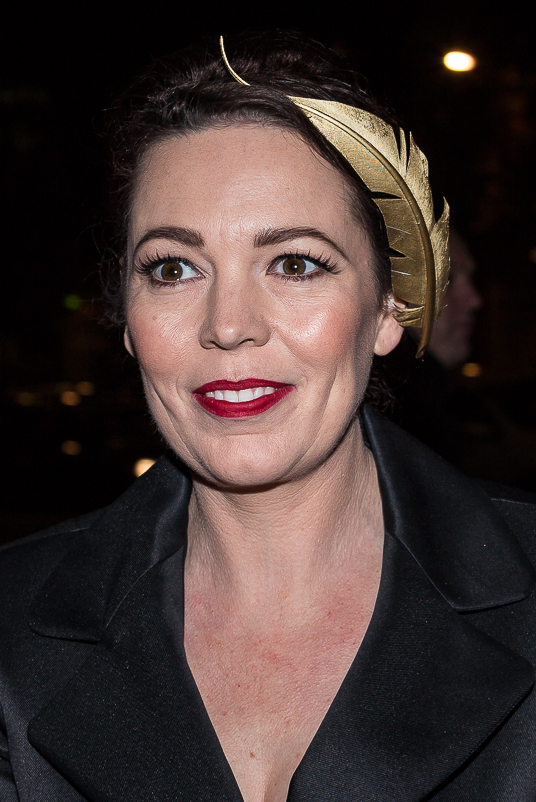
Olivia Colman received critical acclaim and three out of the five major Best Actress awards for her role in The Favourite.

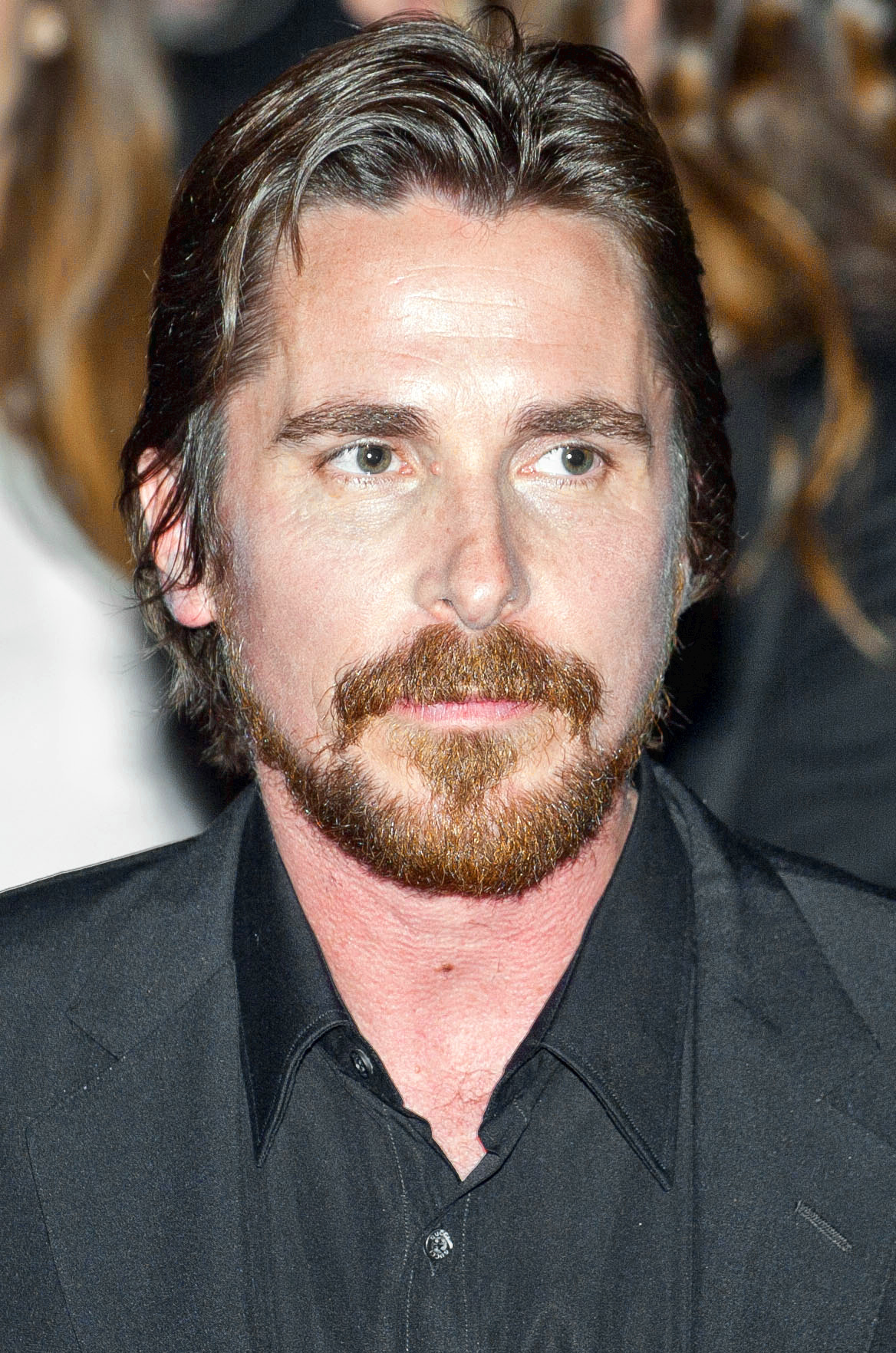
Christian Bale received critical acclaim and multiple awards for his lead role in Vice.

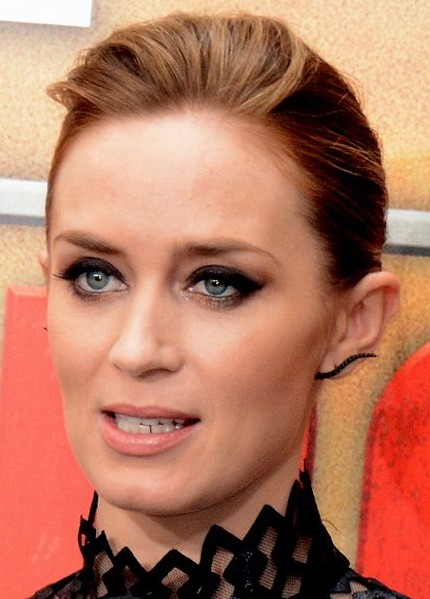
Emily Blunt received critical acclaim for her performances in Mary Poppins Returns and A Quiet Place.

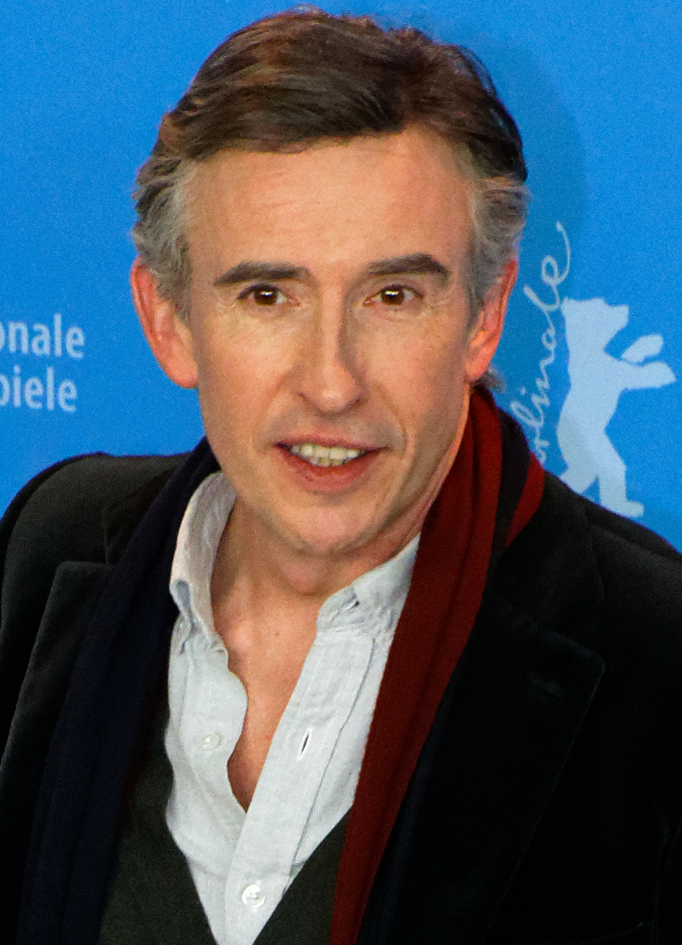
Steve Coogan garnered acclaim and multiple nominations for his role in Stan & Ollie.

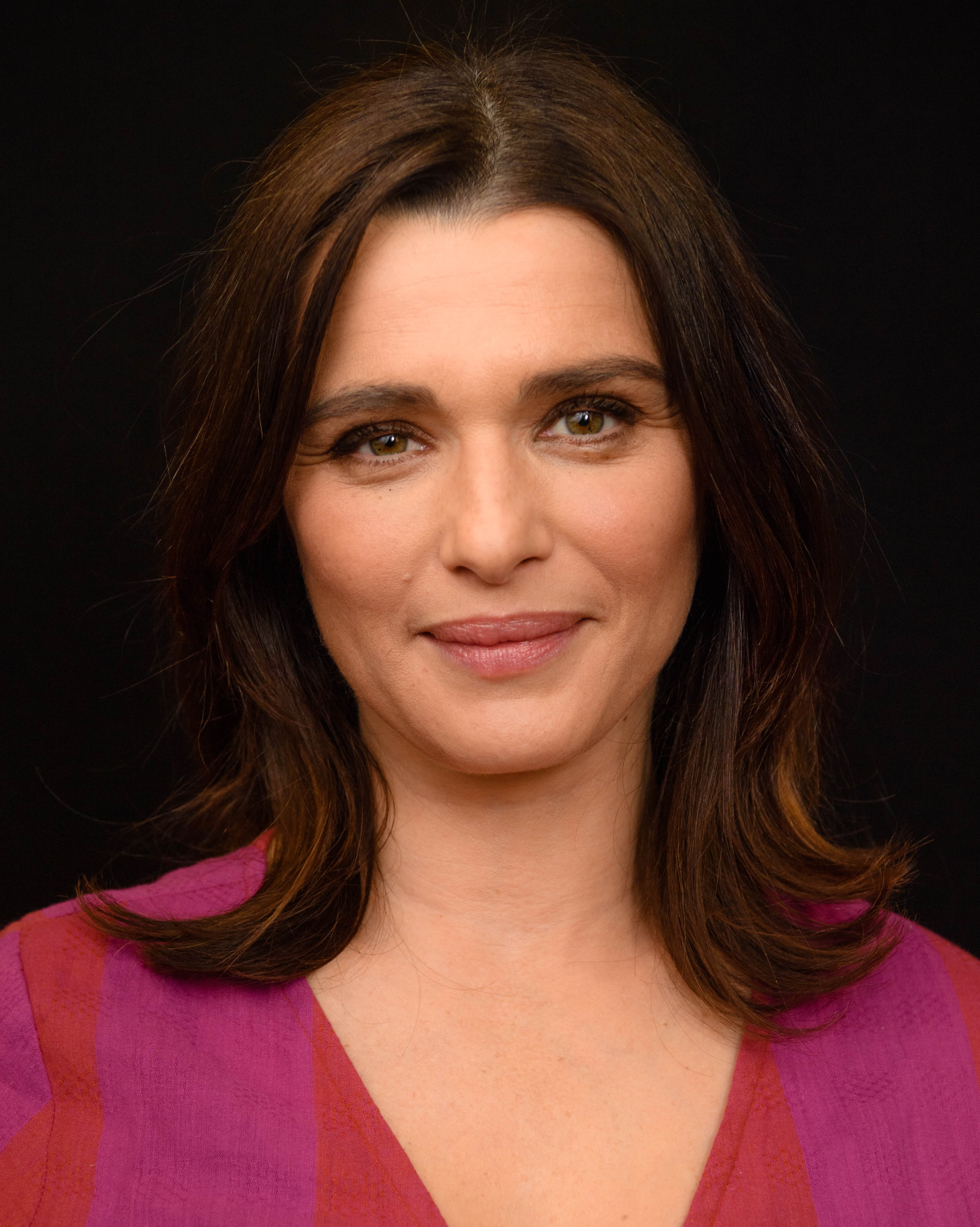
Rachel Weisz garnered multiple nominations for her supporting role in The Favourite.

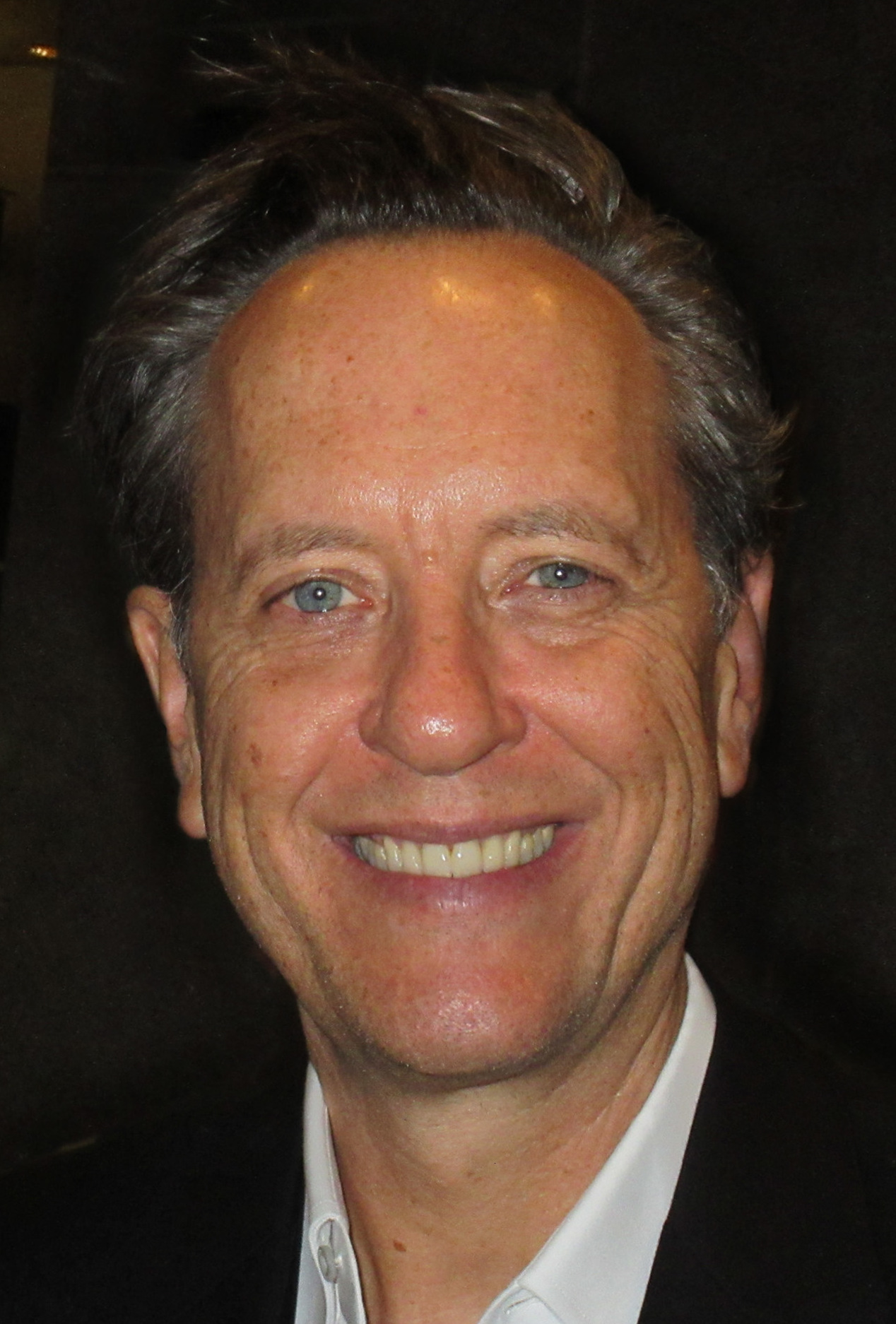
Richard E. Grant garnered acclaim and multiple nominations for his supporting role in Can You Ever Forgive Me?.

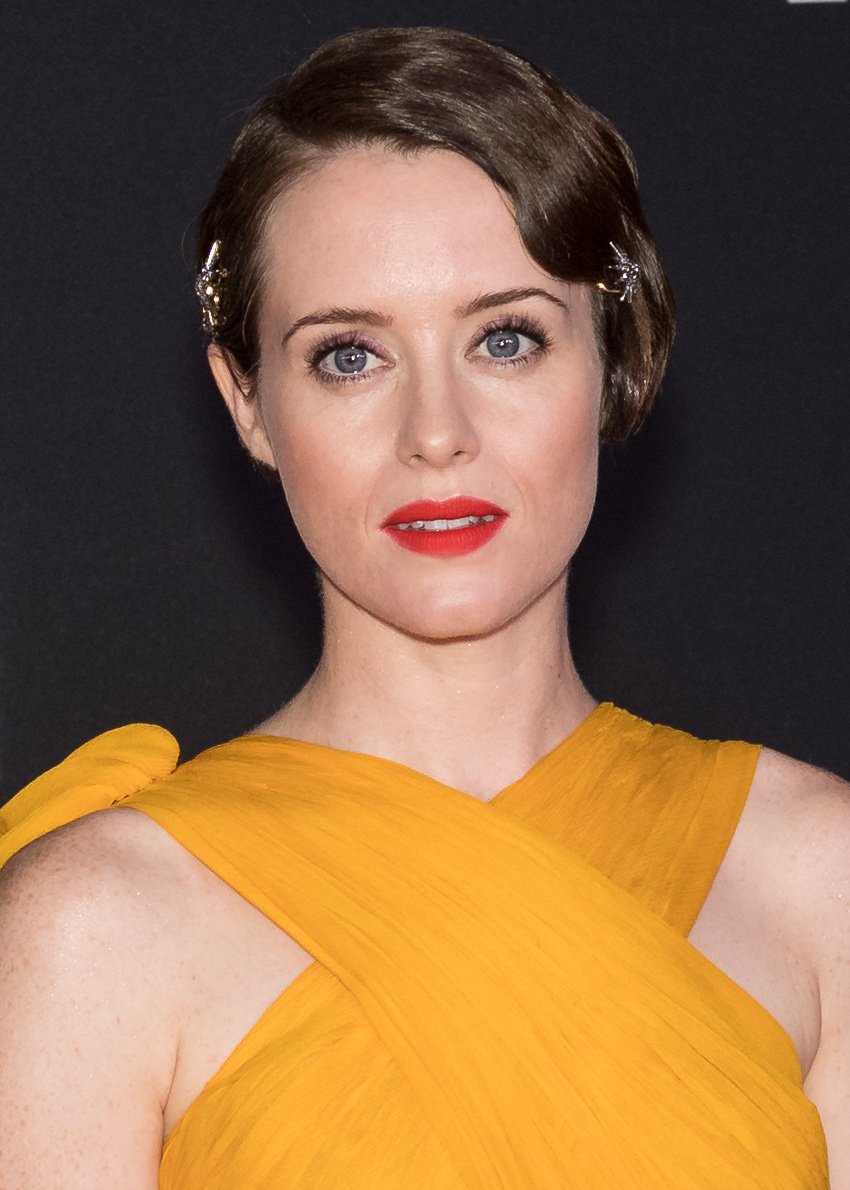
Claire Foy garnered acclaim and multiple nominations for her supporting role in First Man

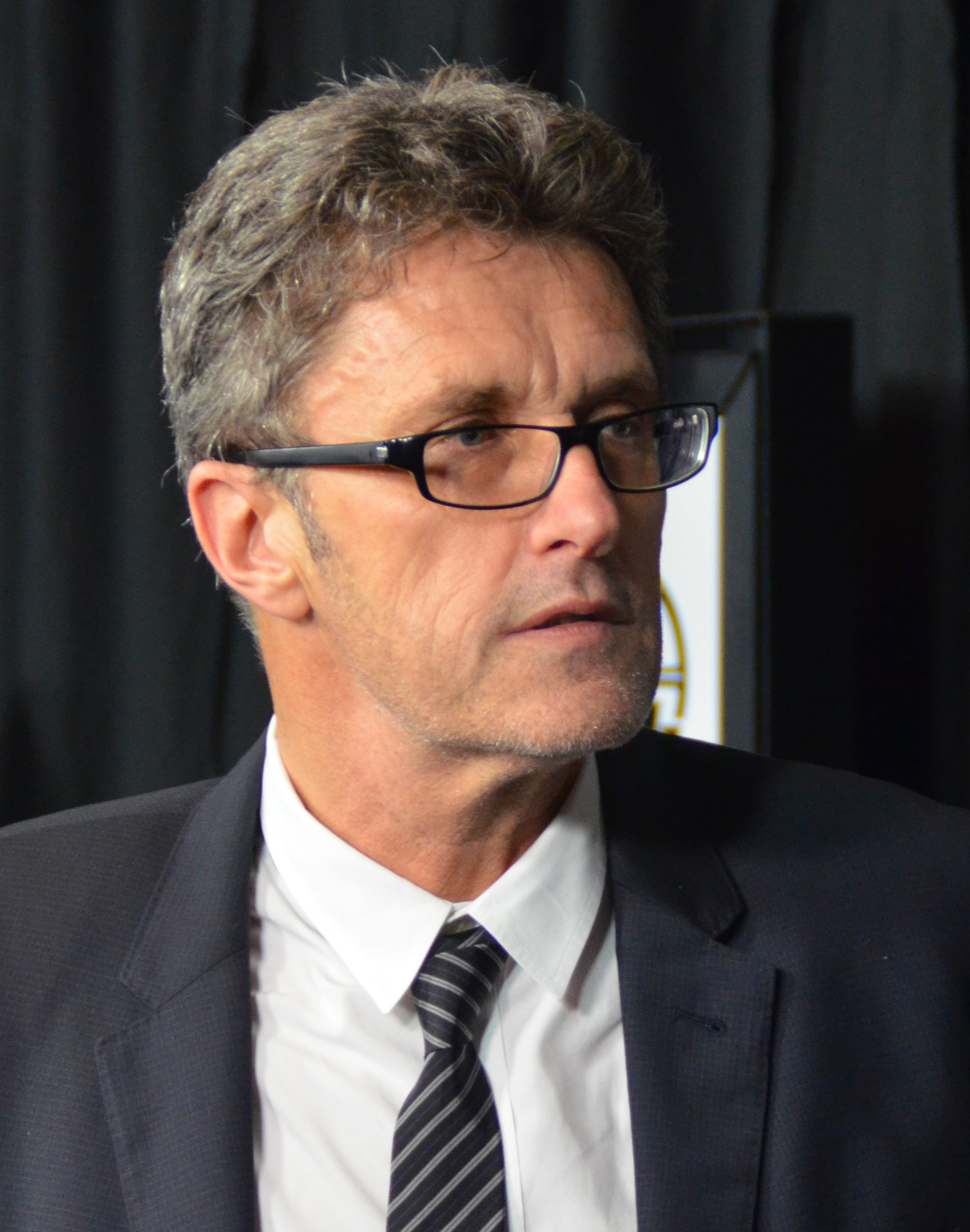
UK-based film director Paweł Pawlikowski, garnered multiple nominations for Cold War.

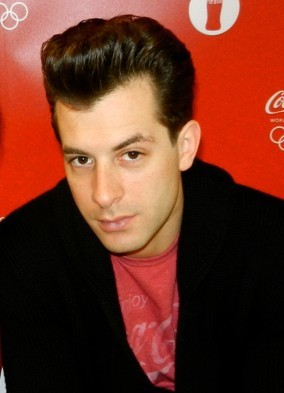
Mark Ronson received multiple Best Song awards for "Shallow", in collaboration with Lady Gaga, Anthony Rossomando and Andrew Wyatt.

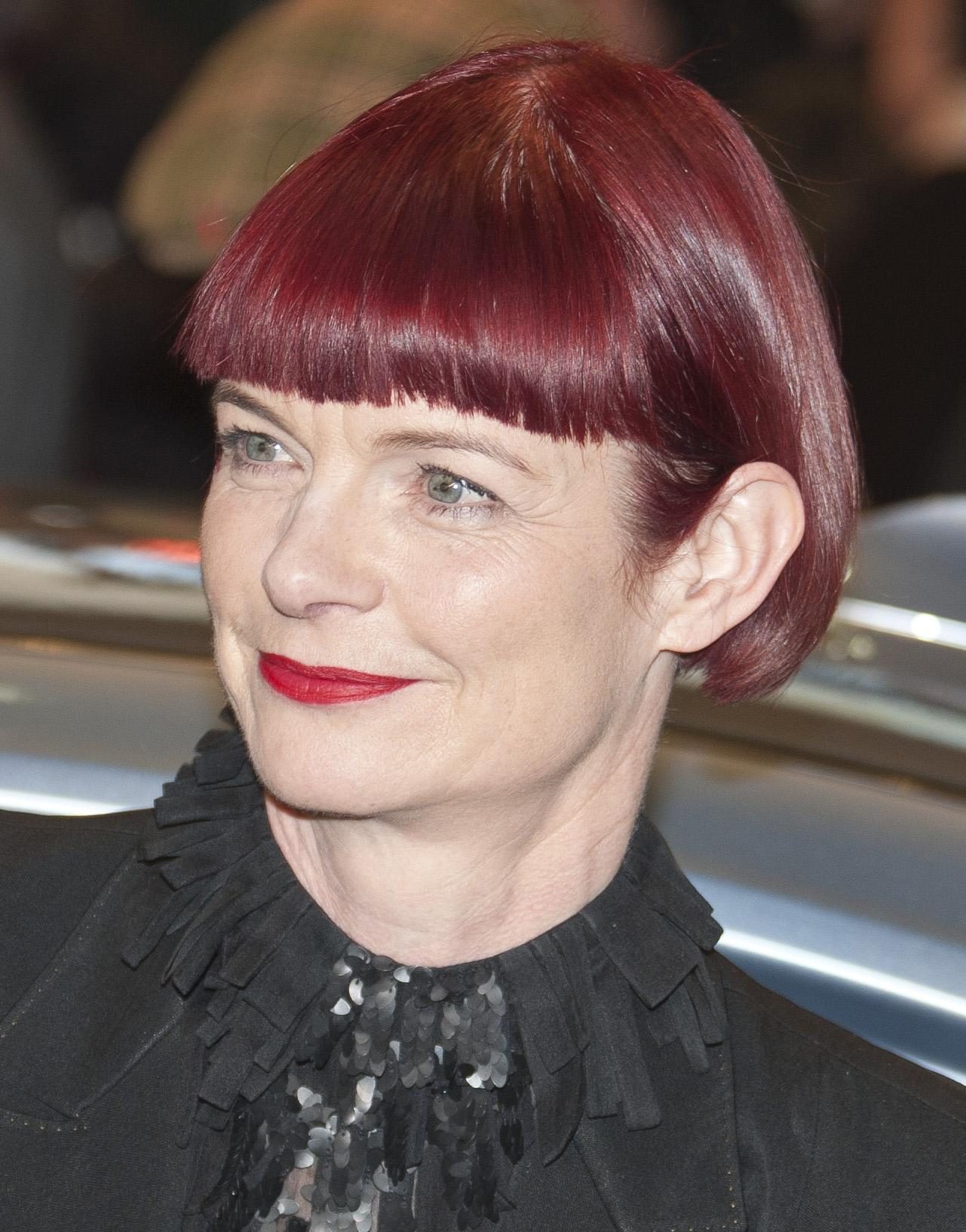
Sandy Powell received multiple Best Costume nominations for The Favourite and Mary Poppins Returns.

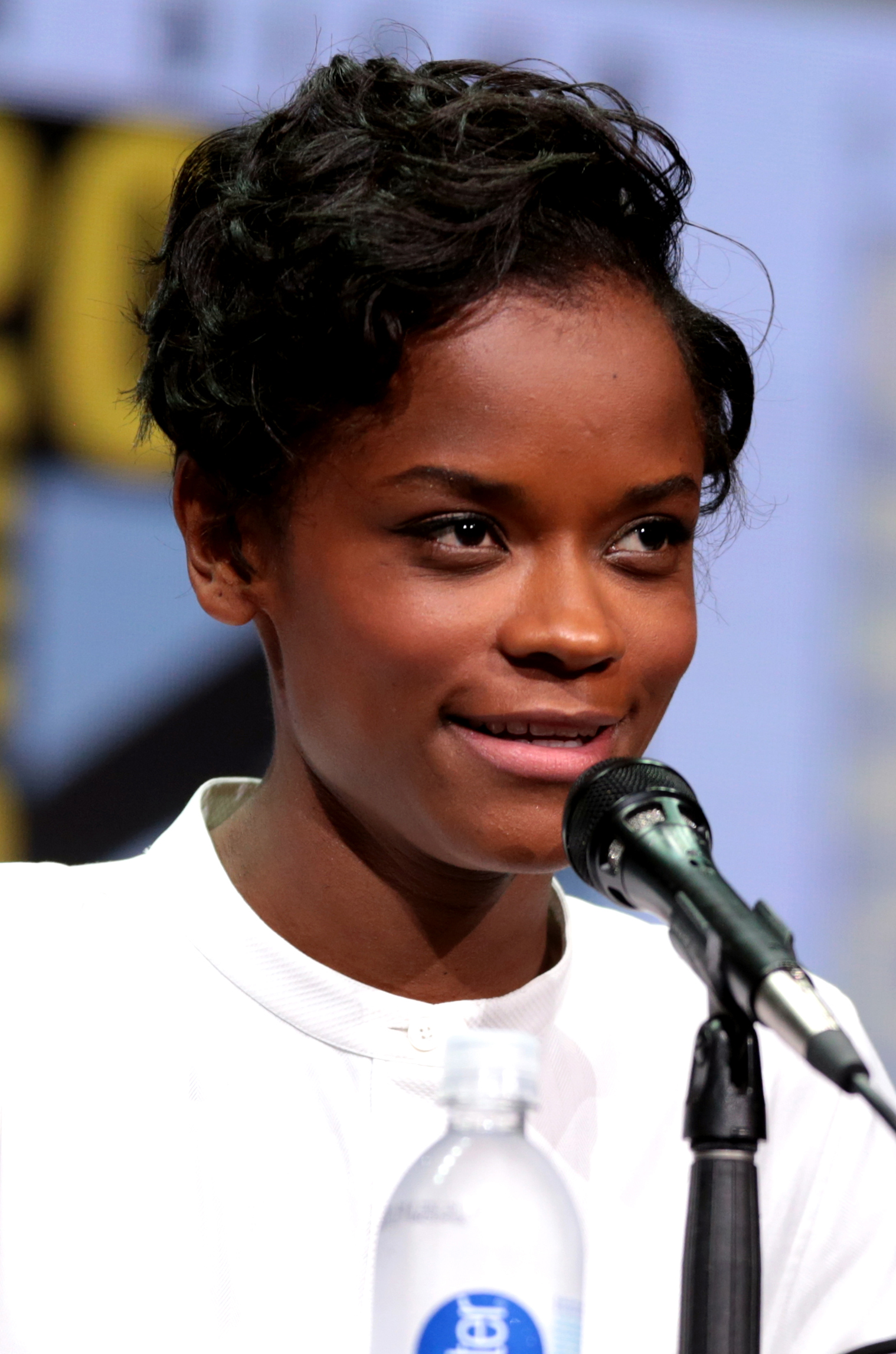
Letitia Wright received the BAFTA Rising Star.

Listed here are the British winners and nominees at the five most prestigious film award ceremonies in the English-speaking world: the Academy Awards, British Academy Film Awards, Critics' Choice Awards, Golden Globe Awards and Screen Actors Guild Awards, that were held during 2019, celebrating the best films of 2018. The British nominations were led by Bohemian Rhapsody which, along with The Favourite, also lead in the technical categories. British films did, however, notably lose out to Roma from Mexico and Green Book from USA. British VFX artists, sound designers and sound mixers led the technical categories for American films like First Man, Ready Player One and Solo: A Star Wars Story.

=== Academy Awards ===
The 91st Academy Awards honoring the best films of 2018 will be held on February 24, 2019.

British winners:

- Bohemian Rhapsody (Best Actor, Best Sound Editing, Best Sound Mixing, Best Film Editing)
- The Favourite (Best Actress)
- John Casali (Best Sound Mixing) – Bohemian Rhapsody
- Mark Ronson (Best Original Song) – "Shallow" (A Star Is Born)
- Nina Hartstone (Best Sound Editing) – Bohemian Rhapsody
- Olivia Colman (Best Actress) – The Favourite
- Paul Massey (Best Sound Mixing) – Bohemian Rhapsody
- Tim Cavagin (Best Sound Mixing) – Bohemian Rhapsody

British nominees:

- At Eternity's Gate (Best Actor)
- Bohemian Rhapsody (Best Picture)
- Cold War (Best Director, Best Foreign Language Film, Best Cinematography)
- The Favourite (Best Picture, Best Director, Best Supporting Actress, Best Original Screenplay, Best Production Design, Best Cinematography, Best Costume Design, Best Film Editing)
- Mary Queen of Scots (Best Makeup & Hairstyling, Best Costume Design)
- The Wife (Best Actress)
- Alexandra Byrne (Best Costume Design) – Mary Queen of Scots
- Alice Felton (Best Production Design) – The Favourite
- Alison Snowden (Best Animated Short Film) – Animal Behaviour
- Barry Alexander Brown (Best Original Score) – BlacKkKlansman
- Chris Lawrence (Best Visual Effects) – Christopher Robin
- Chris Corbould (Best Visual Effects) – Christopher Robin
- Christian Bale (Best Actor) – Vice
- David Shirk (Best Visual Effects) – Ready Player One
- Deborah Davis (Best Original Screenplay) – The Favourite
- Dominic Tuohy (Best Visual Effects) – Solo: A Star Wars Story
- Graham King (Best Picture) – Bohemian Rhapsody
- Jenny Shircore (Best Makeup & Hairstyling) – Mary Queen of Scots
- Marc Pilcher (Best Makeup & Hairstyling) – Mary Queen of Scots
- Matthew E. Butler (Best Visual Effects) – Ready Player One
- Michael Eames (Best Visual Effects) – Christopher Robin
- Nathan Crowley (Best Production Design) – First Man
- Neal Scanlan (Best Visual Effects) – Solo: A Star Wars Story
- Paul Lambert (Best Visual Effects) – First Man
- Rachel Weisz (Best Supporting Actress) – The Favourite
- Roger Guyett (Best Visual Effects) – Ready Player One
- Richard E. Grant (Best Supporting Actor) – Can You Ever Forgive Me?
- Sandy Powell (Best Costume Design) – The Favourite and Mary Poppins Returns
- Theo Jones (Best Visual Effects) – Christopher Robin
- Tristan Myles (Best Visual Effects) – First Man

=== British Academy Film Awards ===
The 72nd British Academy Film Awards honoring the best films of 2018 were held on 10 February 2019.

British winners:

- Beast (Outstanding Debut by a British Writer, Director or Producer)
- Bohemian Rhapsody (Best Actor, Best Sound)
- The Favourite (Outstanding British Film, Best Original Screenplay, Best Actress, Best Supporting Actress, Best Production Design, Best Costume Design, Best Makeup & Hair)
- Roughhouse (Best British Short Animation)
- Alex Lockwood (Best British Short Documentary) – 73 Cows
- Alice Felton (Best Production Design) – The Favourite
- Beverley Binda (Best Makeup & Hair) – The Favourite
- Deborah Davis (Best Original Screenplay) – The Favourite
- Elizabeth Karlsen (Outstanding British Contribution To Cinema)
- Jonathan Hodgson (Best British Short Animation) – Roughhouse
- Lauren Dark (Outstanding Debut by a British Writer, Director or Producer) – Beast
- Letitia Wright (BAFTA Rising Star)
- Michael Pearce (Outstanding Debut by a British Writer, Director or Producer) – Beast
- Olivia Colman (Best Actress) – The Favourite
- Rachel Weisz (Best Supporting Actress) – The Favourite
- Roger Pratt (Outstanding Contribution to Cinematography)
- Sandy Powell (Best Costume Design) – The Favourite
- Sue Bruce-Smith (Outstanding Contribution to Cinema)
- 73 Cows (Best British Short Film)

British nominees:

- Apostasy (Outstanding Debut by a British Writer, Director or Producer)
- Beast (Outstanding British Film)
- Bohemian Rhapsody (Outstanding British Film, Best Cinematography, Best Editing, Best Costume Design, Best Makeup & Hair)
- Cold War (Best Film Not in the English language, Best Director, Best Original Screenplay, Best Cinematography)
- Fantastic Beasts: The Crimes of Grindelwald (Best Production Design, Best Special Visual Effects)
- The Favourite (Best Film, Best Director, Best Supporting Actress, Best Cinematography, Best Editing)
- Mary Queen of Scots (Best Supporting Actress, Best Costume Design, Best Makeup & Hair)
- McQueen (Outstanding British Film, Best Documentary)
- Ray & Liz (Outstanding Debut by a British Writer, Director or Producer)
- Stan & Ollie (Outstanding British Film, Best Actor, Best Makeup & Hair)
- Widows (Best Actress)
- The Wife (Best Actress)
- They Shall Not Grow Old (Best Documentary)
- Three Identical Strangers (Best Documentary)
- You Were Never Really Here (Outstanding British Film)
- Alexandra Byrne (Best Costume Design) – Mary Queen of Scots
- The Brothers McLeod (Best British Short Animation) – Marfa
- Claire Foy (Best Supporting Actress) – First Man
- Chris Kelly (Outstanding Debut by a British Writer, Director or Producer) – A Cambodian Spring
- Christian Bale (Best Actor) – Vice
- Cynthia Erivo (BAFTA Rising Star)
- Daniel Kokotajlo (director) (Outstanding Debut by a British Writer, Director or Producer) – Apostasy
- Jacqui Davies (Outstanding Debut by a British Writer, Director or Producer) – Ray & Liz
- Jan Sewell (Best Makeup & Hair) – Bohemian Rhapsody
- Jenny Shircore (Best Makeup & Hair) – Mary Queen of Scots
- Julian Day (Best Costume Design) – Bohemian Rhapsody
- Leanne Welham (Outstanding Debut by a British Writer, Director or Producer) – Pili
- Nathan Crowley (Best Production Design) – First Man
- Richard Billingham (Outstanding Debut by a British Writer, Director or Producer) – Ray & Liz
- Richard E. Grant (Best Supporting Actor) – Can You Ever Forgive Me?
- Sandy Powell (Best Costume Design) – Mary Poppins Returns
- Sophie Harman (Outstanding Debut by a British Writer, Director or Producer) – Pili
- Stephen Woolley (Outstanding British Contribution To Cinema)
- Steve Coogan (Best Actor) – Stan & Ollie
- Stuart Craig (Best Production Design) – Fantastic Beasts: The Crimes of Grindelwald
- Bachelor, 38 (Best British Short Film)
- The Blue Door (Best British Short Film)
- The Field (Best British Short Film)
- I'm OK (Best British Short Animation)
- Marfa (Best British Short Animation)
- Wale (Best British Short Film)

=== Critics' Choice Awards ===
The 24th Critics' Choice Awards was presented on January 13, 2019.

British winners:

- The Favourite (Best Acting Ensemble, Best Actress in a Comedy)
- The Wife (Best Actress)
- Christian Bale (Best Actor, Best Actor in a Comedy) – Vice
- Claire Foy – #SeeHer Award
- Mark Ronson (Best Original Song) – "Shallow" (A Star Is Born)
- Olivia Colman (Best Acting Ensemble, Best Actress in a Comedy) – The Favourite
- Nicholas Hoult (Best Acting Ensemble) – The Favourite
- Rachel Weisz (Best Acting Ensemble) – The Favourite

British nominees:

- Annihilation (Best Sci-fi or Horror Movie)
- At Eternity's Gate (Best Actor)
- Bohemian Rhapsody (Best Actor, Best Costume Design, Best Hair & Makeup)
- Cold War (Best Foreign Language Film)
- The Death of Stalin (Best Comedy)
- The Favourite (Best Picture, Best Actress, Best Supporting Actress, Best Director, Best Original Screenplay, Best Cinematography, Best Production Design, Best Editing, Best Costume Design, Best Hair & Makeup, Best Comedy)
- Mary Queen of Scots (Best Costume Design, Best Hair & Makeup)
- Stan & Ollie (Best Actor in a Comedy)
- Widows (Best Acting Ensemble, Best Editing, Best Action Movie)
- Adam Gough (Best Editing) – Roma
- Al Shuckburgh (Best Original Song) – "All the Stars" (Black Panther)
- Alexandra Byrne (Best Costume Design) – Mary Queen of Scots
- Alice Felton (Best Production Design) – The Favourite
- Claire Foy (Best Supporting Actress) – First Man
- Deborah Davis (Best Original Screenplay) – The Favourite
- Emily Blunt (Best Actress, Best Actress in a Comedy) – Mary Poppins Returns
- Joe Walker (Best Editing) – Widows
- Julian Day (Best Costume Design) – Bohemian Rhapsody
- Nathan Crowley (Best Production Design) – First Man
- Olivia Colman (Best Actress) – The Favourite
- Rachel Weisz (Best Supporting Actress) – The Favourite
- Richard E. Grant (Best Supporting Actor) – Can You Ever Forgive Me?
- Sandy Powell (Best Costume Design) – The Favourite and Mary Poppins Returns

=== Golden Globe Awards ===
The 76th Golden Globe Awards was presented on January 6, 2019.

British winners:

- Bohemian Rhapsody (Best Motion Picture – Drama, Best Performance in a Motion Picture – Drama)
- The Favourite (Best Performance in a Motion Picture – Musical or Comedy)
- The Wife (Best Performance in a Motion Picture – Drama)
- Christian Bale (Best Performance in a Motion Picture – Musical or Comedy) – Vice
- Mark Ronson (Best Original Song) – "Shallow" (A Star Is Born)
- Olivia Colman (Best Performance in a Motion Picture – Musical or Comedy) – The Favourite

British nominees:

- At Eternity's Gate (Best Performance in a Motion Picture – Drama)
- The Favourite (Best Motion Picture – Musical or Comedy, Best Supporting Performance in a Motion Picture, Best Screenplay)
- Stan & Ollie (Best Performance in a Motion Picture – Musical or Comedy)
- Al Shuckburgh (Best Original Song) – "All the Stars" (Black Panther)
- Annie Lennox (Best Original Song) – "Requiem for a Private War" (A Private War)
- Claire Foy (Best Supporting Performance in a Motion Picture) – First Man
- Deborah Davis (Best Screenplay) – The Favourite
- Emily Blunt (Best Performance in a Motion Picture – Musical or Comedy) – Mary Poppins Returns
- Rachel Weisz (Best Supporting Performance in a Motion Picture) – The Favourite
- Richard E. Grant (Best Supporting Performance in a Motion Picture) – Can You Ever Forgive Me?
- Rosamund Pike (Best Performance in a Motion Picture – Drama) – A Private War

=== Screen Actors Guild Awards ===
The 25th Screen Actors Guild Awards was presented on January 27, 2019.

British winners:

- Andy Serkis (Outstanding Performance by a Cast in a Motion Picture) – Black Panther
- Daniel Kaluuya (Outstanding Performance by a Cast in a Motion Picture) – Black Panther
- Emily Blunt (Outstanding Performance by a Female Actor in a Supporting Role in a Motion Picture) – A Quiet Place
- Letitia Wright (Outstanding Performance by a Cast in a Motion Picture) – Black Panther
- Martin Freeman (Outstanding Performance by a Cast in a Motion Picture) – Black Panther
- Bohemian Rhapsody (Outstanding Performance by a Male Actor in a Leading Role in a Motion Picture)
- The Wife (Outstanding Performance by a Female Actor in a Leading Role in a Motion Picture)

British nominees:

- Ben Hardy (Outstanding Performance by a Cast in a Motion Picture) – Bohemian Rhapsody
- Christian Bale (Outstanding Performance by a Male Actor in a Leading Role in a Motion Picture) – Vice
- Emily Blunt (Outstanding Performance by a Female Actor in a Leading Role in a Motion Picture) – Mary Poppins Returns
- Gemma Chan (Outstanding Performance by a Cast in a Motion Picture) – Crazy Rich Asians
- Gwilym Lee (Outstanding Performance by a Cast in a Motion Picture) – Bohemian Rhapsody
- Henry Golding (Outstanding Performance by a Cast in a Motion Picture) – Crazy Rich Asians
- Lucy Boynton – (Outstanding Performance by a Cast in a Motion Picture) – Bohemian Rhapsody
- Olivia Colman (Outstanding Performance by a Female Actor in a Leading Role in a Motion Picture) – The Favourite
- Rachel Weisz (Outstanding Performance by a Female Actor in a Supporting Role in a Motion Picture) – The Favourite
- Rafi Gavron (Outstanding Performance by a Cast in a Motion Picture) – A Star Is Born
- Richard E. Grant (Outstanding Performance by a Male Actor in a Supporting Role in a Motion Picture) – Can You Ever Forgive Me?
- Tom Hollander (Outstanding Performance by a Cast in a Motion Picture) – Bohemian Rhapsody
- Bohemian Rhapsody (Outstanding Performance By a Cast in a Motion Picture)
- The Favourite (Outstanding Performance by a Female Actor in a Leading Role in a Motion Picture, Outstanding Performance by a Female Actor in a Supporting Role in a Motion Picture)
- Mary Queen of Scots (Outstanding Performance by a Female Actor in a Supporting Role in a Motion Picture)

== See also ==
- Lists of British films
- 2019 in film
- 2019 in British music
- 2019 in British radio
- 2019 in British television
- 2019 in the United Kingdom
- List of 2019 box office number-one films in the United Kingdom
- List of British films of 2018
- List of British films of 2020
