= Jane Brennan =

Irish actress

- Born: Ireland
- Occupation: Actress
- Years active: 1980–present

Jane Brennan is an Irish actress. Primarily known for her work on the stage, she played Mary Lacey in the Academy Award-nominated film Brooklyn. She also had a recurring role as Lady Margaret Bryan on the series The Tudors. She is the co-founder of the Bespoke Theatre Company.

== Biography ==
Her father was Denis Brennan, a theatre director. Her mother was Daphne (née Carroll) Brennan, an actress. Several other members of her family are also actors.

Brennan made her film debut in Attracta (1983), an Irish film that starred Wendy Hiller. In 2002, she appeared in the television remake of The Magnificent Ambersons. She played Hannah Arnold in the 2003 television film Benedict Arnold: A Question of Honor. Also in 2003, she appeared in Veronica Guerrin, an Irish drama film about the murder of Veronica Guerin. She also had supporting roles in Perrier's Bounty, Death of a Superhero, and John Crowley's Intermission.

For her performance as Mary Lacey, the mother of Saoirse Ronan's character in Brooklyn, she won Best Supporting Actress at the 13th Irish Film & Television Awards.

On stage, she has performed in many productions at the Abbey and Peacock Theatres in Dublin. As well as the Gate Theatre. Among her many roles include performances in The Singular Life of Albert Nobbs, Dancing at Lughnasa, The Playboy of the Western World, and The Beauty Queen of Leenane.

She appeared opposite Sarah Bolger in Abner Pastoll's 2019 crime-thriller A Good Woman Is Hard to Find, written by Academy Award nominee Ronan Blaney. She had a main cast role in crime drama Hidden Assets as CAB Chief Eileen Gately.
