= Frédéric Pierrot =

French actor (born 1960)

- Pierrot in 2026
- Born: 17 September 1960 (age 65); Boulogne-Billancourt, Hauts-de-Seine, France
- Occupation: Actor
- Years active: 1986–present

Frédéric Pierrot (French: [fʁedeʁik pjɛʁo]; born 17 September 1960) is a French actor.

== Career ==
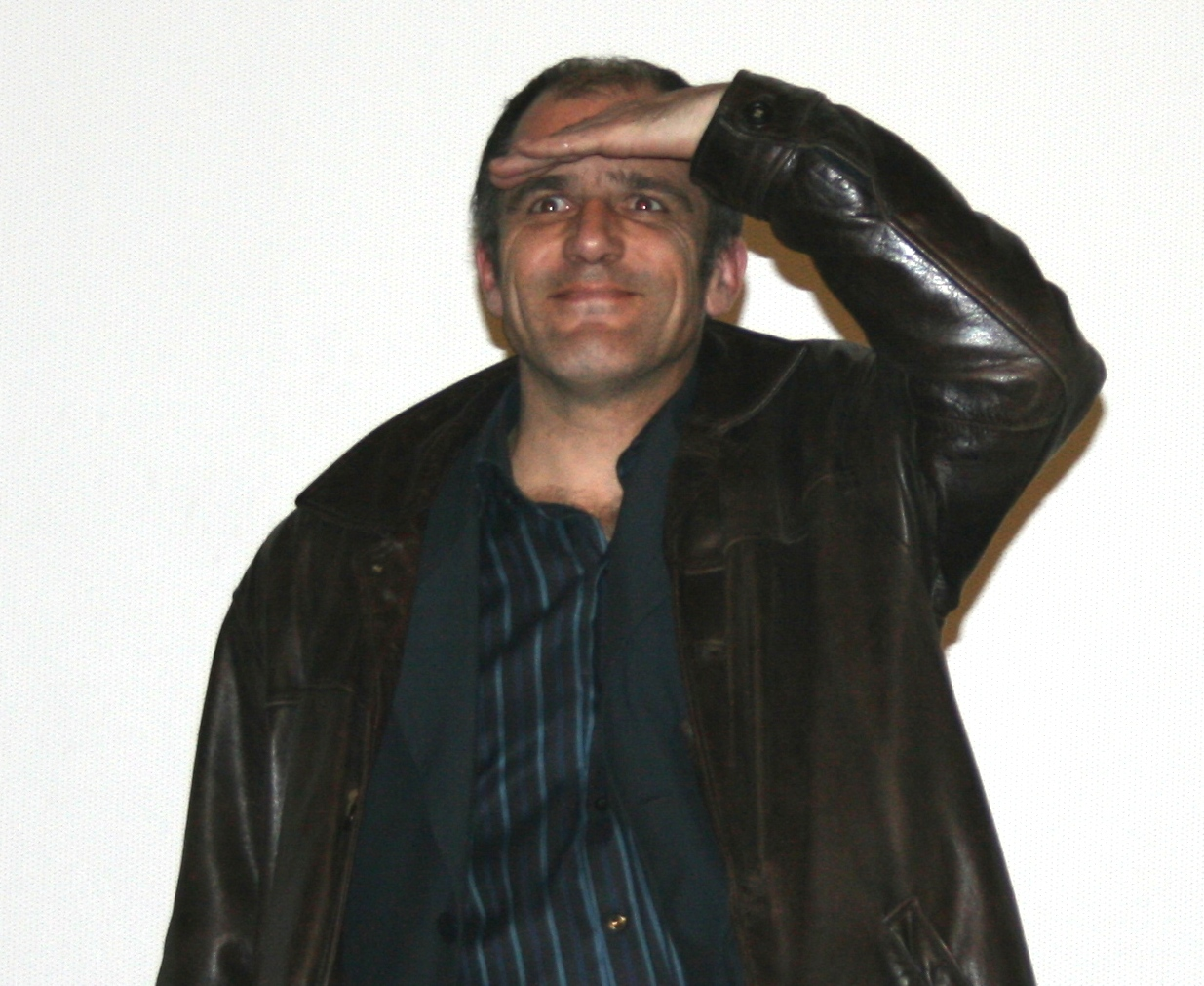
Frédéric Pierrot at the premiere of I've Loved You So Long, in 2008.

He has appeared in more than 120 films and television shows since 1986. He starred in the film Tell Me I'm Dreaming, which was screened in the Un Certain Regard section at the 1998 Cannes Film Festival. He was also in Abner Pastoll's 2015 film Road Games.

He's also known for playing the lead role in the TV Series In Therapy from 2021 to 2022.

In 2012, Pierrot was nominated at the César Award for Best Supporting Actor for his role in Polisse.

In 2020, he was nominated at the Molière Award for Best Supporting Actor for his work on Opening Night.

== Life ==
Even if he is discreet about his private life, he revealed that he was married to an actress with whom he has two children and since 2022, he is a grandfather.

He plays the clarinet.

== Theatre ==
Year	Title	Author	Director	Notes
2005	Grand et petit	Botho Strauss	Philippe Calvario	
2007	Tom Is Dead	Marie Darrieussecq	Arthur Nauzyciel	
2008–09	Ordet	Kaj Munk	Arthur Nauzyciel	
2009–11	Prévert Blues	Jacques Prévert	Frédéric Pierrot & Henri Texier	
2017–18	Three Sisters	Anton Chekhov	Simon Stone	
2019	Opening Night	John Cassavetes	Cyril Teste	Nominated - Molière Award for Best Supporting Actor
2020–21	Mes frères	Pascal Rambert	Arthur Nauzyciel	
2022	The Children	Lucy Kirkwood	Éric Vigner	
2023	Mes frères	Pascal Rambert	Arthur Nauzyciel	

== Filmography ==
Year	Title	Role	Director	Notes
1986	Manège	The young man	Jacques Nolot	Short
1987	Papillon du vertige	Alex	Jean-Yves Carrée	
1989	Life and Nothing But	Marcel	Bertrand Tavernier	
1989	Constance		Pascal Deux	Short
1989	Comme d'habitude		Bruno Herbulot	Short
1989	Haute tension	Noël Roux	Jacques Ertaud	TV series (1 episode)
1991	La neige et le feu	Raisin	Claude Pinoteau	
1992	L.627	Réné	Bertrand Tavernier	
1993	Les arpenteurs de Montmartre	The husband	Boris Eustache	
1993	Comment font les gens	Serge	Pascale Bailly	Short
1993	Le siècle des lumières	Carlos	Humberto Solás	TV movie
1994	Comme un dimanche		Olivier Jahan	Short
1995	Circuit Carole	Alexandre	Emmanuelle Cuau	
1995	Land and Freedom	Bernard Goujon	Ken Loach	
1995	Maigret	Canut	Pierre Granier-Deferre	TV series (1 episode)
1995	Combats de femme	François Walevsky	Eric Woreth	TV series (1 episode)
1996	My Man	The cop	Bertrand Blier	
1996	Captain Conan	The conductor	Bertrand Tavernier	
1996	For Ever Mozart	Jérôme	Jean-Luc Godard	
1996	Les aveux de l'innocent	The psychiatrist	Jean-Pierre Améris	
1996	Rien dans le ventre		Carlos Pardo	Short
1996	Vivre avec toi	André	Claude Goretta	TV movie
1996	Les Alsaciens ou les deux Mathilde	Franzl Imhof	Michel Favart	TV mini-series
1997	Artemisia	Roberto	Agnès Merlet	
1997	Inside/Out	Jean Hammett	Rob Tregenza	
1997	Port Djema	Antoine Barasse	Éric Heumann	
1997	Les Sanguinaires	François	Laurent Cantet	
1997	Au bord de l'autoroute	Rémi	Olivier Jahan	Short
1998	Disparus	Blaise	Gilles Bourdos	
1998	For Sale	Man in the couple	Laetitia Masson	
1998	Ça ne se refuse pas	Benny	Eric Woreth	
1998	Tell Me I'm Dreaming	Luc	Claude Mouriéras	
1998	Aniel	Marc	François Roux	Short
1999	Fleurs de sel	Philippe Cavala	Arnaud Sélignac	TV movie
1999	Trois saisons	Batti	Edwin Baily	TV movie
1999	Les coquelicots sont revenus	Patrick	Richard Bohringer	TV movie
1999	Chasseurs d'écume	Collinée	Denys Granier-Deferre	TV mini-series
2000	Modern Life	Jacques	Laurence Ferreira Barbosa	
2000	April Captains	Manuel	Maria de Medeiros	
2001	Imago	Paul	Marie Vermillard	
2001	The Girl from Paris	Gérard	Christian Carion	
2001	La fille de son père	Francis	Jacques Deschamps	
2001	Les alizés	Loïc Caron	Stéphane Kurc	TV movie
2002	Va, petite !	Paulo	Alain Guesnier	
2002	Les Diables	The man in the house	Christophe Ruggia	
2002	Le grand patron	Jacques Rouvier	Stéphane Kappes	TV series (1 episode)
2003	Inquiétudes	David Lamblin	Gilles Bourdos	
2003	Monsieur N.	Gaspard Gourgaud	Antoine de Caunes	
2003	That Woman	Daniel	Guillaume Nicloux	
2003	Quelques jours entre nous	Michel	Virginie Sauveur	TV movie
2004	Immortal	John	Enki Bilal	
2004	Holy Lola	Xavier	Bertrand Tavernier	
2004	Clara et moi	Étienne	Arnaud Viard	
2004	They Came Back	Gardet	Robin Campillo	
2004	Dans tes rêves	The man	Blandine Lenoir	Short
2004	Grossesse nerveuse	Inspector	Maxime Sassier	Short
2004	La fuite de Monsieur Monde	The inspector	Claude Goretta	TV movie
2005	Avant l'oubli	Pierre	Augustin Burger	
2005	La ravisseuse	Rodolphe	Antoine Santana	
2005	Journées froides qui menacent les plantes		Virginie Chanu	
2005	Rosa	The man	Blandine Lenoir	Short
2005	À corps défendant	Paul	Raphaël Etienne	Short
2005	Le mystère Alexia	Fabien Harcourt	Marc Rivière	TV movie
2005	Le bal des célibataires	Robert	Jean-Louis Lorenzi	TV movie
2006	Demain la veille	Man in the elevator	Julien Lecat & Sylvain Pioutaz	Short
2006	Harkis	Captain Robert	Alain Tasma	TV movie
2006	Aller simple	René Loxa	Jean-Marc Brondolo	TV movie
2006	L'uomo che rubò la Gioconda	Lépine	Fabrizio Costa	TV movie
2006	L'État de Grace	Xavier	Pascal Chaumeil	TV mini-series
2007	Très bien, merci	The itern	Emmanuelle Cuau	
2007	Les fourmis rouges	Franck	Stéphan Carpiaux	
2007	Epuration	Robert	Jean-Louis Lorenzi	TV movie
2007	Tragédie en direct	Max	Marc Rivière	TV movie
2007	Opération Turquoise	Christophe Gosselin	Alain Tasma	TV movie
2008	Let It Rain	Antoine	Agnès Jaoui	
2008	I've Loved You So Long	Captain Fauré	Philippe Claudel	
2008	Revenir	The man	Anne-Marie Puga	Short
2008	Les couillus		Mirabelle Kirkland	Short
2008	Le soleil des ternes	Antoine	Eric Bu	Short
2009	Adieu De Gaulle adieu	François Flohic	Laurent Herbiet	TV movie
2009	Les Petits Meurtres d'Agatha Christie	Jean Villiers	Eric Woreth	TV series (1 episode)
2010	Sarah's Key	Bertrand Tezac	Gilles Paquet-Brenner	
2010	Sans queue ni tête	François Briand	Jeanne Labrune	
2010	Les frileux	Alain Dufresnes	Jacques Fansten	TV movie
2010	Tango	Thierry Sauvage	Philippe Venault	TV series (1 episode)
2010	Histoires de vies		Valérie Minetto	TV series (1 episode)
2011	Polisse	Baloo	Maïwenn	Nominated - César Award for Best Supporting Actor
2011	Iris in Bloom	Alexandre's father	Valérie Mréjen & Bertrand Schefer	
2011	Declaration of War	Doctor Sainte-Rose	Valérie Donzelli	
2011	Au cas où je n'aurais pas la palme d'or	The producer	Renaud Cohen	
2011	Qui sème le vent...	Jean-Michel Ledantec	Frédéric Garson	TV movie
2012	Populaire	Jean Pamphyle	Régis Roinsard	
2012	Cherry on the Cake	Bertrand	Laura Morante	
2012	L'innocent	Thierry Deville	Pierre Boutron	TV movie
2012	Eléonore, l'intrépide	Gaspard	Ivan Calbérac	TV movie
2012–15	The Returned	Jérôme Séguret	Fabrice Gobert, Frédéric Goupil, ...	TV series (16 episodes)
2013	Le prochain film	Pierre Gravet	René Féret	
2013	Young & Beautiful	Patrick	François Ozon	
2013	Portraits de maîtresses		Rocco Labbé	Short
2014	L'année prochaine	Bertrand	Vania Leturcq	
2014	Rosemary's Baby	Father Tekem	Agnieszka Holland	TV mini-series
2015	Les Bêtises	The official	Alice & Rose Philippon	
2015	Road Games	Grizard	Abner Pastoll	
2015	I Kissed a Girl	Hubert Deprez	Maxime Govare & Noémie Saglio	
2015	Marguerite & Julien	Jean de Ravalet	Valérie Donzelli	
2015	Anton Tchékhov 1890	Leo Tolstoy	René Féret	
2015	Bal de famille	The father	Stella Di Tocco	Short
2015	Boulevard du Palais	Mathieu Casal	Christian Bonnet	TV Series (1 episode)
2016	Chocolat	Théodore Delvaux	Roschdy Zem	
2016	Port Bou	The father	Jean Anouilh	Short
2016	Tuer un homme	Matteo	Isabelle Czajka	TV movie
2017	Luna	Sébastien	Elsa Diringer	
2017	Endangered Species	Laurent Gardet	Gilles Bourdos	
2017	À la dérive	Jean Druelle	Philippe Venault	TV movie
2018	Place publique	Jean-Paul	Agnès Jaoui	
2018	À 2 heures de Paris	Henri	Virginie Verrier	
2018	By the Grace of God	Captain Courteau	François Ozon	
2018	Une vie après	Dominique	Jean-Marc Brondolo	TV movie Festival de la Fiction TV - Best Actor
2018	Nox	Garraud	Mabrouk El Mechri	TV mini-series
2018	Fiertés	Charles	Philippe Faucon	TV mini-series
2018–22	50 nuances de Grecs	Poseidon / Agamemnon	Mathieu Signolet	TV series (20 episodes)
2019	Mother	Grégory	Rodrigo Sorogoyen	
2019	The Specials	Inspector IGAS	Éric Toledano and Olivier Nakache	
2019	Persona non grata	Eddy Laffont	Roschdy Zem	
2019	La vie de château	Régis	Nathaniel Hlimi & Clémence Madeleine-Perdrillat	Short
2020	Spring Blossom	Suzanne's father	Suzanne Lindon	
2021	Le bruit des trousseaux	Lise's father	Philippe Claudel	TV movie
2021–22	In Therapy	Philippe Dayan	Éric Toledano and Olivier Nakache, ...	TV series (70 episodes); Nominated - ACS Award for Best Actor (2021); Nominated - ACS Award for Best Actor (2022)
2024	Citoyens clandestins	Steiner	Laetitia Masson	TV mini-series Post-Production
2024	La Peste	Dr. Bernard Rieux	Antoine Garceau	TV mini-series Filming
2026	Les Misérables	Monseigneur Bienvenu Myriel	Fred Cavayé	Adaptation of Les Misérables by Victor Hugo
TBA	Dalloway †	TBA	Yann Gozlan	Filming
