= François Flohic =

French naval officer (1920–2018)

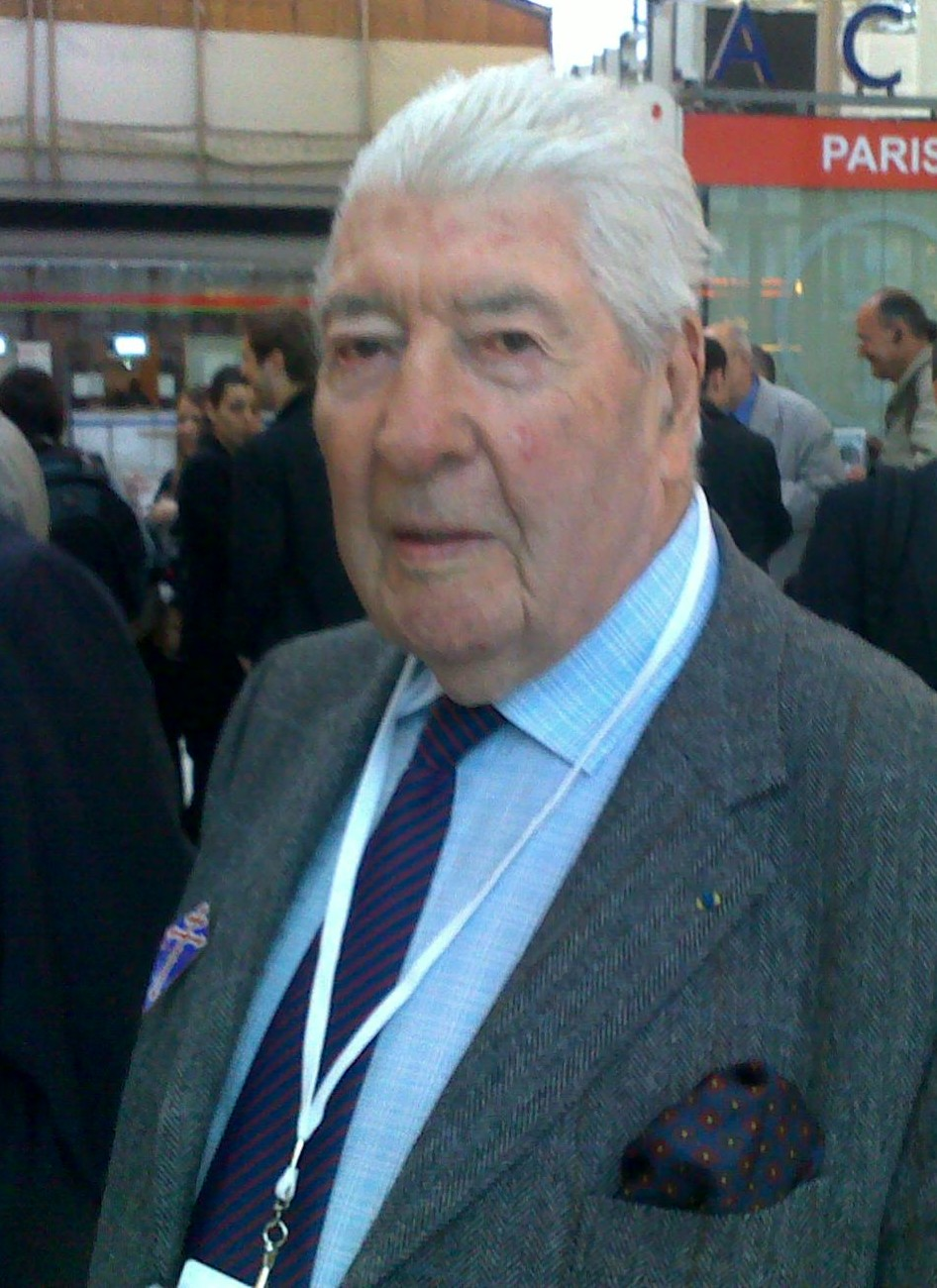
François Flohic in 2010

François Flohic (French pronunciation: [fʁɑ̃swa flɔ.ik]; 2 August 1920 – 5 September 2018) was a French naval officer and associate of General Charles de Gaulle. Born in Ploubazlanec, Brittany, he joined the Free French Naval Forces during World War II. He saw action escorting Atlantic convoys and took part in the D-day landings at Normandy, and in the course of his career eventually rose to the rank of admiral. After the war, he served as an advisor and aide-de-camp to de Gaulle, whom he had first met in 1943. He published several books of memoirs, including Ni chagrin ni pitié : souvenirs d'un marin de la France libre (1985) and De Gaulle intime (2010).

He was named a Commander of the Legion of Honor, and awarded the Grand Cross of the National Order of Merit.

Flohic was portrayed by actor Frédéric Pierrot in the 2009 television movie Adieu De Gaulle adieu.
