= Joséphine de La Baume =

French actress, singer, film director, and model

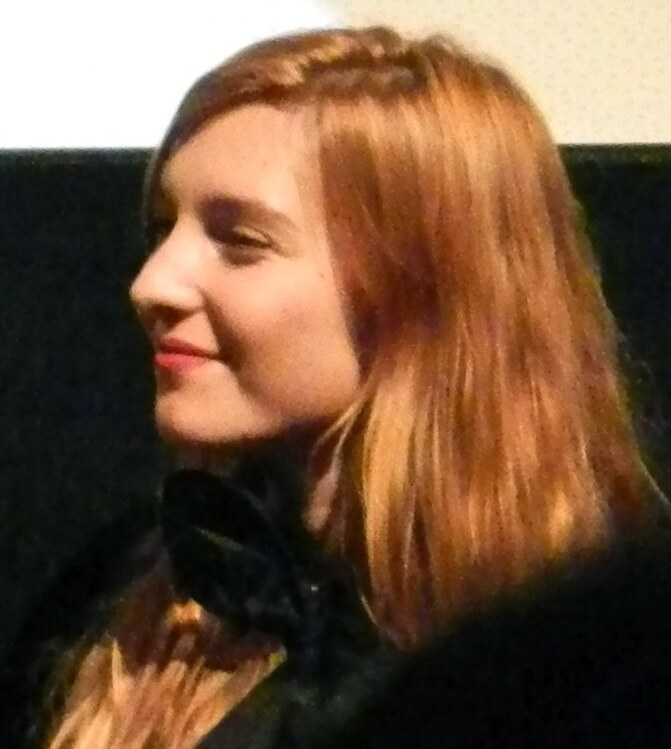
- de La Baume in 2014
- Born: 8 October 1984 (age 41); Paris, France
- Education: American University in London
- Occupations: Actress, singer, director, model
- Spouse: Mark Ronson (m. 2011; div. 2018)
- Partner(s): Carlos O'Connell (2020–present)
- Children: 2

Joséphine de La Baume (born 8 October 1984) is a French actress, singer, film director, and model. In 2018, she started the rock and garage group Film Noir.

== Career ==
In 2010 she worked with Romain Gavras on his debut film Our Day will come and later was cast in Bertrand Tavernier's The Princess of Montpensier, selected in the main competition of Cannes Film Festival 2011. She then started working in the UK on features such as One Day by Lone Scherfig, Johnny English Reborn by Oliver Parker, Titanic written for ITV by Julian Fellowes, Mr Selfridges and Ron Howard's Rush. From 2012, she started working in the US on projects such as Kiss of The Damned directed by Xan Cassavetes and Listen Up Philip directed by Alex Ross Perry and Julie Last Name directed by Alex Beh which premiered on Nowness in 2024.

Most recently, she appeared in Abner Pastoll's Road Games (Fausse Route) in which Dread Central described her as "sultry and enigmatic." The film was released theatrically in the US by IFC Films.

== Singtank ==
De La Baume is a member of French indie band Singtank, with her brother Alexandre de la Baume and drummer Alberto Cabrera. Their debut album In Wonder was a critical success.

"Growing up I was a massive fan of Michael Jackson, he [Josephine's brother] was a massive fan of Elvis Presley, so there was a bit of the "Who's the King? Who is the actual King?" He had his hair like Elvis and I dressed like Michael Jackson, so he definitely looked better than I did, I think. Then we decided to branch out and play music together then eventually the music became better and we sent it to a bunch of people. One of them was Nellee Hooper who produced Massive Attack and Bjork, and he really liked it. He first lent us the studio in London to make better demos. When he heard them, he offered to produce the record."

== Film Noir ==
Founded by Josephine in 2018, Film Noir released their first EP titled Vertiges (Men of Glory) in 2019, which was well received. The first single La Mariée (vague à l'âme) got into the France Inter Radio summer playlist. The second single Brûlant also got on the France Inter radio playlist. Film Noir collaborated on their EP with Cundo Bermudez (Ty Segall, No Age), Cole Alexander and Zumi Rosow (Black Lips), Kirin J Callinan and Samy Osta (Juniore, La Femme), and Sacha Got (La Femme).

== Personal life ==
De La Baume married English DJ Mark Ronson on 3 September 2011. On 21 April 2017, she separated from Ronson. The divorce was finalised in October 2018. She has been dating Carlos O'Connell since 2020. In December 2022, they announced they were expecting a child. She gave birth to a daughter on 14 February 2023. In November 2025, Josephine announced she was pregnant with her second child.

== Filmography ==
- 2010: The Princess of Montpensier by Bertrand Tavernier
- 2010: Our Day Will Come by Romain Gavras
- 2011: One Day by Lone Scherfig
- 2011: Johnny English Reborn by Oliver Parker
- 2012: Confession of a Child of the Century by Sylvie Verheyde
- 2012: Kiss of the Damned by Alexandra Cassavetes
- 2013: Rush by Ron Howard
- 2013: Quai d'Orsay
- 2013: Joy de V.
- 2014: If You Don't, I Will
- 2014: Listen Up Philip
- 2015: Eva & Leon
- 2015: Road Games
- 2016: Ma vie criminelle
- 2017: Madame
- 2017: The Hitman's Bodyguard
- 2017: Bees Make Honey
- 2015-2018: A Very Secret Service
- 2018: Alien Crystal Palace
- 2018: Paris Pigalle
- 2019: Femme Enfant
- 2019: Why not Choose Love: A Mary Pickford Manifesto
- 2020: Waiting for Anya
- 2021: Madame Claude
- 2024: Julie Last Name
- 2024: The New Look
- 2025: Chopin, Chopin!
