= Edward Hogg =

English actor (born 1979)

- Born: Edward George Hogg; 26 January 1979 (age 47); Doncaster, Yorkshire, England
- Occupation: Actor
- Years active: 2002–present
- Height: 5 ft 10 in (1.78 m)

Edward George Hogg (born 26 January 1979) is an English actor, known for portraying Jesco White in White Lightnin', Stephen Turnbull in Bunny and the Bull, Eugene Mathers in Indian Summers, Segundus in Jonathan Strange & Mr Norrell, Michael 'Godders' Godfrey in Taboo, and Thomas Haxby in Harlots.

== Early life ==
Hogg, the second of four children, was born in Doncaster and brought up in Sheffield. He went to Wales High School. His mother is a teacher and his father a retired civil engineer. As a teenager, Hogg was a member of several bands, including post-punk group Porno King, in which he was the lead singer. When the band split, he joined an amateur dramatics group, Sheffield MISTCO, with his younger sister, transferring his love of performance to acting.

Hogg trained at the Royal Academy of Dramatic Art between 1999 and 2002.

Hogg has stated that his acting hero is Al Pacino, and the director he would most like to work with is Paul Thomas Anderson.

When asked what medium he preferred, Hogg chose theatre over film. He was quoted as saying: "I like being in film, I like going to watch a film, and I'm in it, and going 'wow' but, actually, I think doing the physical kind of acting, being on stage, is better. Because it's happening, it's instant, there and then all the time."

== Career ==
Hogg made his professional debut in a production of My Father's Son at the Sheffield Crucible. His other theatre work includes the inaugural production of King Lear at the RSC Academy, Loot at the Bristol Old Vic, and the title role in Woyzeck, both at London's Gate Theatre, and off Broadway. Other credits include Measure for Measure, The Tempest, The Last Days of Judas Iscariot and Rock 'n' Roll. Hogg has also appeared in The Pillowman and Our Class, both at the National Theatre.

On television, Hogg has appeared in Doctors, Heartbeat and Silent Witness. He has lent his voice to the radio dramas Metropolis, Boxing Clever, Serjeant Musgrave's Dance and The Loop.

Hogg made his film debut in Nicholas Nickleby (2002), playing the younger version of David Bradley's character, Mr Bray. He played his first film lead role in White Lightnin' (2009), as Jesco White. Hogg's other film credits include Alfie (2004), Song of Songs (2006), Bunny and the Bull (2009) and the short films Veteran and Shades of Beige.

Hogg played the role of Robert Cecil in Anonymous (2011), directed by Roland Emmerich. He also appeared in Ollie Kepler's Expanding Purple World (2010), Isle of Dogs (2010) and Me or the Dog (2011), directed by Abner Pastoll. In 2012 Hogg starred in Tom Shkolnik's debut feature, the drama The Comedian.

Hogg played the part of Segundus in the seven-part miniseries Jonathan Strange & Mr Norrell, screened on BBC One in 2015.

In January 2017, Hogg starred in the television period drama Taboo alongside Tom Hardy. He plays Michael Godfrey. Taboo was renewed for a second season. In March 2017, Hogg starred in the television period drama Harlots as Thomas Haxby. Harlots was renewed for a second season.

Hogg portrayed Romeo at Shakespeare's Globe Theatre in London, directed by Daniel Kramer in the summer of 2017. In summer 2018, he played Orlando in As You Like It at the Regent's Park Open Air Theatre.

His upcoming films include Barnaby Southcombe's Scarborough and Abner Pastoll's A Good Woman Is Hard to Find.

== Awards and recognition ==
Hogg was awarded a Commendation at the 2005 Ian Charleson Awards for his performance in the Gate Theatre, London production of Woyzeck. He was nominated for Most Promising Newcomer at the British Independent Film Awards 2009 for his role in White Lightnin', and won Best Actor awards at the Monterrey and Mumbai Film Festivals for the same role.

In 2010, Hogg was the UK recipient of the Shooting Stars Award at the Berlin Film Festival, and of the Chopard/Premiere Magazine Male Revelation of the Year Award 2010 at the Cannes Film Festival.

== Filmography ==
=== Films ===
Year	Film	Role	Notes
2002	Nicholas Nickleby	Young Mr Bray	Non-speaking role
2004	Alfie	Bright Young Thing	
2005	Song of Songs	Luke	Uncredited
2005	Brothers of the Head	Chris Dervish	Credited as Ed Hogg
2009	White Lightnin'	Jesco White	Nominated for Most Promising Newcomer at the British Independent Film Awards 2009; Winner of Best Actor Award at the Monterrey International Film Festival 2009; Winner of Silver Gateway of India Best Actor Award at the 11th Mumbai Film Festival, 2009
2009	Bunny and the Bull	Stephen Turnbull	
2010	Ollie Kepler’s Expanding Purple World	Ollie Kepler	Premiered at the Edinburgh International Film Festival in June 2010
2010	Isle of Dogs	Riley	Premiered at London's FrightFest 2010
2011	Anonymous	Robert Cecil	
2011	Me or the Dog	Tom	Festival de Cannes - Coup de Coeur
2012	Imagine	Ian	
2012	The Comedian	Ed	Screened at the London Film Festival
2013	Mary, Queen of Scots	Moray	Screened at the Toronto Film Festival
2013	The Phone Call	Daniel	Short film
2015	Jupiter Ascending	Chicanery Night	
2015	Kill Your Friends	DC Alan Woodham	
2015	The Program	Frankie Andreu	
2016	Road Games	Cameo	Directed by Abner Pastoll
2016	Adult Life Skills	The Snorkeler	Premiered at the Tribeca Film Festival 2016
2018	Scarborough	Aiden	
2019	A Good Woman Is Hard to Find	Leo Miller	
2025	The Actor	Make Up Artist	

=== Television ===
Year	Show	Role	Notes
2002	Celeb	Michael Jackson: The Guest (2002)	Comedy
2002	Heartbeat	Danny: Growing Apart (2002)	Period police drama
2004	The Bermuda Triangle: Beneath the Waves	Lt Charles Taylor	Drama
2007	Doctors	Toby Parker: Hero (2007)	Soap opera
2010	Silent Witness	Howard Day: Voids: Part One (2010)	Crime drama
2010	Misfits	Elliot/Jesus Christ: Christmas Special (2010)	Comedy-drama
2012	Dead Boss	Henry (2012)	Comedy series
2015	Indian Summers	Eugene Mathers	Drama
2015	Jonathan Strange & Mr Norrell	Segundus	Supernatural drama
2016	Beowulf: Return to the Shieldlands	Varr	TV series
2017	Taboo	Godfrey	TV series
2017	Harlots	Thomas Haxby	TV series
2020	Pennyworth	Colonel Salt	
2021	The Irregulars	Daimler	Crime drama series
