= Emelie (film) =

- Theatrical release poster
- Directed by: Michael Thelin
- Screenplay by: Richard Raymond Harry Herbeck
- Story by: Richard Raymond Harry Herbeck; Michael Thelin
- Produced by: Andrew D. Corkin
- Starring: Sarah Bolger; Joshua Rush; Carly Adams; Thomas Bair; Susan Pourfar; Chris Beetem
- Cinematography: Luca Del Puppo
- Edited by: Eric Nagy
- Music by: Phil Mossman
- Production companies: Uncorked Productions; Sandbar Pictures; Abandon Features
- Distributed by: Warner Bros
- Release dates: April 22, 2015 (Tribeca Film Festival); March 4, 2016 (United States)
- Running time: 82 minutes
- Country: United States
- Language: English

Emelie is a 2015 American horror thriller film directed by Michael Thelin and written by Richard Raymond Harry Herbeck. The film stars Sarah Bolger, Joshua Rush, Carly Adams, Thomas Bair, Susan Pourfar and Chris Beetem. The film was released on March 4, 2016, by Warner Bros to generally positive reviews by critics.

== Plot ==
A girl named Anna is supposed to be babysitting a family but is kidnapped by Emelie Liroux and an unidentified man. Emelie then poses as Anna and enters the house of Dan and Joyce Thompson, whose kids, 4-year-old Christopher, 9-year-old Sally, and 11-year-old Jacob, Anna is supposed to be babysitting while Dan and Joyce are celebrating their 13-year anniversary.

Emelie exhibits odd and often disturbing behavior after the parents leave as she seems to favor Christopher over his older siblings. After playing dress-up and instructing the kids to play hide-and-seek, she turns off the internet modem, removes the laces from the kids' shoes, and breaks open the safe. She makes Jacob unwrap a new tampon for her, then inserts it in front of him, wiping herself. In the restaurant, Dan and Joyce are being watched by the man who helped kidnap Anna.

After traumatizing Sally by feeding her pet hamster to Jacob’s pet python, Emelie shows her and Christopher a sex tape made by their parents instead of a family-oriented movie. Jacob goes through Emelie's things and finds out that she's not actually Anna. He is horrified to see what Emelie has put on the TV and turns it off.

At bedtime, Emelie tells Christopher and Sally a story of a mama bear who had a cub that she loved dearly. One day, tragedy struck, the cub died, and Mama Bear met Skinny Hyena, who said he'd help her make a new cub. Mama Bear and Skinny Hyena got into trouble and escaped to a new land to search for a new cub. Emelie is the mama bear in the story: one night, she fell asleep with her baby on the couch, accidentally suffocating him. The accidental death of her son left her bereaved and unstable. Until one fateful day, Emelie met the equally mentally unstable Skinny Man (who is probably her new husband or boyfriend), but she couldn't have any more children and was unable to adopt a new child because of her country’s eligibility requirements. As a result, they got into legal trouble, and ultimately had to flee from Canada to the United States, where Emelie is seen watching children at a playground before setting her plan into action. She texts her lover Skinny Man that she's found her "cubby" and instructs him to prevent Dan and Joyce from returning home to buy her time.

Maggie, the kids' usual babysitter, checks in at the front door, since she hasn't heard from Anna, her friend. Maggie is skeptical that the normally rambunctious kids are so subdued. As she leaves, Sally shoves a note asking for help into Maggie's bag. Maggie reads the note in her car but Emelie knocks her unconscious.

Emelie makes the kids drink cough syrup but Jacob secretly forces himself to vomit so he can remain awake. Sally and Christopher become incapacitated. Jacob contacts his friend and neighbor Howie for help. Emelie begins gathering Christopher's things, intending to kidnap him to fulfill her desire to be a mother again. She then plans to smother Jacob with a pillow (as she perceived him as a nuisance in her plans), only to discover that he has escaped to meet with Howie for a new stash of fireworks and a plan to rescue his younger siblings. Maggie wakes up and attacks Emelie to protect the children. Emelie kills her as Jacob hides Christopher.

Meanwhile, Dan and Joyce call a cab. On their way home, Skinny Man tries to stop them by crashing his car into the taxi to buy Emelie time for her plans, but he sacrificed himself in the collision in order to fulfill her dream of becoming a mother again. Police tell the parents that Skinny Man had no ID and the car was stolen.

Jacob finds Maggie's body in the basement. Emelie threatens Jacob that she will kill Sally unless Jacob brings her Christopher. She also shows Jacob Howie's jacket and tells him to meet her in the backyard with Christopher. In the backyard, Jacob subdues Emelie with Howie's lit fireworks in a recycling bin and takes Sally back.

Police open the trunk of the crashed car and to their horror, they find the lifeless body of the real Anna in the trunk and realise that the "Anna" at their house is an impostor. Dan, Joyce, and the police all rush to the house. Jacob loads his siblings into his father's Chevrolet Corvette in the garage. Emelie emerges and Jacob runs her over in the driveway. The police and his parents arrive, and the kids reunite with them. It is revealed that Howie is also alive, having only suffered an injury to his head.

Emelie is shown limping away from the scene, implying that she escapes or is presumably caught by authorities afterward.

== Cast ==
- Sarah Bolger as Emelie
- Robert Bozek as Skinny Man
- Joshua Rush as Jacob Thompson
- Carly Adams as Sally Thompson
- Thomas Bair as Christopher Thompson
- Susan Pourfar as Joyce Thompson
- Chris Beetem as Dan Thompson
- Elizabeth Jayne as Maggie
- Randi Langdon as Anna
- Hilary R. Walker as Mother
- Carl Bailey as Officer Morton
- Dante Hoagland as Howie
- Annette Christian as Howie's mom
- Ryan Monolopolus as Young Dan
- Brian Mysliwy as Officer Serinos
- Frank Rossi as Tow Truck Driver

== Release ==
The film premiered at the Tribeca Film Festival on April 22, 2015. The film was released on March 4, 2016, by Dark Sky Films.

== Reception ==
The review aggregator Rotten Tomatoes gave the film an approval rating of 88%, based on 34 reviews, and an average rating of 6.54 out of 10. Metacritic reported the film had an average score of 62/100, based on 13 critics, indicating "generally favorable" reviews.

== See also ==
- List of films featuring psychopaths and sociopaths
