= Andrew Simpson (actor) =

Actor from Ireland

- Born: 1 January 1989 (age 37); Derry, Northern Ireland

Andrew Gerard Simpson (born 1 January 1989) is an actor from Northern Ireland. He was spotted while performing in a festival by talent scout Patrick Duncan, who was working for director Aisling Walsh, who then cast Simpson in her 2003 film Song for a Raggy Boy. He is best known for appearing in the film Notes on a Scandal.

== Early life ==
Simpson was born in Derry, Northern Ireland, and grew up in the village of Fahan in neighbouring County Donegal, Republic of Ireland. However, he was educated in Derry, and attended Foyle College. His mother sent her four children to Sandra Biddle's speech and drama school in the city. Simpson received four A grades at A-level and went on to attend the London School of Economics in 2010. After completing his law degree, he returned to Northern Ireland, and worked at a building site while continuing to audition.

== Career ==
Simpson's first film appearance was as Gerard Peters 458 in Song for a Raggy Boy (2003), a story about an Irish reform school. In 2006, he appeared opposite Cate Blanchett and Judi Dench in the film Notes on a Scandal. He plays the role of Steven Connolly, a schoolboy whose affair with his art teacher, Sheba Hart (played by Blanchett), leads to disaster. For the role, he earned a five figure sum, which he used to buy a home and pay for university.

In 2012 he appeared in the docudrama Saving The Titanic as electrician Albert Ervine, the youngest member of the engineering crew, which reunited him with Song for a Raggy Boy co-star Chris Newman. In November 2012 he played the part of Nick Nickleby in the BBC drama of the same name, a modern take on the Charles Dickens classic Nicholas Nickleby.

In 2015 Simpson had his first major leading role in Abner Pastoll's Road Games. He re-teamed with director Abner Pastoll for the crime thriller A Good Woman Is Hard to Find starring Sarah Bolger, which was released in 2019.

As of 2016, Simpson worked as a hotel manager.

== Filmography ==
List of acting performances in film and television
Year	Title	Role	Note
2003	Song for a Raggy Boy	Gerard Peters 458	
2006	Notes on a Scandal	Steven Connolly	
2007	Agnes	Seamus	TV movie
2009	Perrier's Bounty	teen #2	
2011	All That Way for Love	Simon	Short film
2012	Saving the Titanic	Albert Ervine	TV movie
2012	White Heat	Connor	TV mini-series (1 episode)
2012	Good Vibrations	Colin "Getty" Getgood	
2012	The Life and Adventures of Nick Nickleby	Nick Nickleby	TV series (5 episodes)
2012	The Measure of a Man	Jay Brady	Short film
2013	Coming Up	Van	TV series (1 episode)
2013	Killing All the Flies	Levin Reid	TV movie
2015	The Survivalist	gaunt man	
2015	Road Games	Jack	
2016	Rebellion	George Wilson	TV mini-series (5 episodes)
2016	Annie Waits	Patrick	Short film
2019	A Good Woman Is Hard to Find	Tito	
2021	Nightride	Felix	Voice
