= Road Games (film) =

2015 film by Abner Pastoll

- Theatrical release poster
- Directed by: Abner Pastoll
- Written by: Abner Pastoll
- Produced by: Guillaume Benski; Junyoung Jang
- Starring: Andrew Simpson; Joséphine de La Baume; Frédéric Pierrot; Barbara Crampton
- Cinematography: Eben Bolter
- Edited by: Abner Pastoll
- Music by: Daniel Elms
- Production companies: February Films; Superbe Films
- Distributed by: Icon Film Distribution (United Kingdom); Marco Polo Production (France)
- Release dates: 30 August 2015 (Film4 FrightFest); 26 August 2016 (United Kingdom); 25 October 2017 (France)
- Running time: 95 minutes
- Countries: United Kingdom; France
- Languages: English; French

Road Games (also known as Fausse Route) is a 2015 thriller film written and directed by Abner Pastoll. The film stars Andrew Simpson as a British hitchhiker travelling through France. IFC Films released the film theatrically in the United States on 4 March 2016. Icon Film Distribution released the film in the United Kingdom and Ireland on 26 August 2016.

== Plot ==
After walking along through the French countryside for hours, without having any cars stop, Jack, a young British hitchhiker, comes upon an arguing couple. Concerned, Jack approaches them and restrains the man out before he can strike the woman. The man backs off and drives away, leaving Jack with the woman, who introduces herself as a fellow hitchhiker named Véronique. Véronique tells him that there is a serial killer active on the road they're on, which explains why Jack could not get a ride. The two agree to travel together for safety, and Véronique helps him work on his French. Véronique says she is a drifter whose parents blame her for her brother's accidental death, and Jack says he lost all his luggage and found his girlfriend cheating on him earlier in the day.

Eventually, the next day, a man, Grizard, stops and offers the two a ride. Although Véronique is reluctant, Jack convinces her to accept Grizard's offer. When Grizard discovers that Jack is English, he enthusiastically invites Jack to meet his English wife. Véronique protests at the detour, but Jack (again) convinces her to accept Grizard's hospitality. On the way to his house, Grizard stops to pick up roadkill and laughs when Jack suggests they bury it instead of eating it.

The group reaches Grizard's house. During dinner, Jack reveals that he is a vegetarian and apologetically declines to eat their meat. Grizard mocks him in French, upsetting Mary and Véronique. When the conversation turns dark, Mary becomes upset and leaves the table. Grizard insists they are safe in his house and urges them to stay the night.

Grizard puts Jack and Véronique in separate bedrooms. Jack finds photographs of a boy and girl in his room, but Grizard tells Jack they have no children. Before Jack goes to bed, Mary advises him to lock his door, which he does. That night, Véronique somehow enters his bedroom, and they have sex. Jack invites her to come to England with him, and she excitedly accepts. When he wakes up the next morning, she is nowhere to be found. Grizard says she has left. He gives Jack a note written by Véronique. Although Jack is suspicious, Grizard insists he immediately leave the house. As he leaves, Jack realizes the handwriting on the note is not Véronique's. Before he can do anything else, he is drugged and kidnapped by Grizard's handyman, Delacroix. Delacroix says Jack must have annoyed Grizard a great deal, and, in French, threatens and mocks Jack. Delacroix forces Jack to drink his homemade soup. Delacroix ties Jack up and puts him in the tailgate of his truck, but, before Delacroix can drive off, Jack escapes.

Jack returns to Grizard's house, where he finds Véronique tied up. After freeing her, he arms himself with a shotgun. Jack and Véronique escape the house in a stolen car; they're pursued by Grizard and Mary. After their car flips, Jack and Véronique flee on foot.

They encounter Delacroix, who, after a scuffle, accidentally impales himself. After Jack falls unconscious due to his injuries, Véronique stabs Delacroix to death. Grizard and Mary find Véronique and Grizard has a vision of Véronique was a child, revealing her as his daughter.

After stuffing Delacroix into their trunk, Mary and Grizard plead with Véronique to return home and stop killing, saying they cannot cover for her anymore. Véronique refuses.

Moments later, Jack approaches the car with the shotgun. He orders the Mary and Grizard to get out of the car. They comply. Véronique ties them up. Mary and Grizard try to explain to Jack that they were just trying to protect him, but Véronique knocks Mary unconscious with the shotgun and gags Grizard.

As Véronique and Jack drive off together, Véronique checks to make sure she has Delacroix's knife.

Meanwhile, Mary wakes up in the field and cries about losing her daughter.

== Cast ==
- Andrew Simpson as Jack
- Joséphine de La Baume as Véronique
- Frédéric Pierrot as Grizard
- Barbara Crampton as Mary
- Féodor Atkine as Delacroix
- Pierre Boulanger as Thierry

== Production ==
Shooting took place mostly in England; twenty days were shot there, and five in France. To simulate French driving conditions, Pastoll had to close off a section of road so they could drive on the right side.

Scenes were also filmed at St Clere, Kent, where Jack, Veronique and Grizard arrive at the house and meet Mary. Scenes also took place at Falconhurst in Kent, where Delacroix drugs Jack and takes him in to the van to his barn, where he feeds him and then puts him back into truck room which Jack escapes. Shooting also took place at Castle Farm - Lavendar, Kent, where Jack and Veronique are seen running across the field away from Grizard and Mary.

== Reception ==
Rotten Tomatoes, a review aggregator, reports that 83% of 18 surveyed critics gave the film a positive review; the average rating is 7/10. John DeFore of The Hollywood Reporter wrote, "Some of the surprises in store play better than others, whose narrative logic is difficult to fathom; then again, Pastoll's ultimate conceit leaves plenty of room for interpretation." Nicolas Rapold of The New York Times wrote that the film becomes "less chilling than mildly confusing, and a little disappointing", falling short of its influences from the 1980s.
