= A Good Woman Is Hard to Find =

2019 film by Abner Pastoll

- Theatrical release poster
- Directed by: Abner Pastoll
- Written by: Ronan Blaney
- Produced by: Junyoung Jang; Guillaume Benski
- Starring: Sarah Bolger; Edward Hogg; Andrew Simpson; Jane Brennan; Caolan Byrne; Packy Lee
- Cinematography: Richard Bell
- Edited by: Abner Pastoll
- Music by: Matthew Pusti
- Production companies: February Films; Superbe Films; Frakas Productions
- Distributed by: Signature Entertainment
- Release dates: 21 July 2019 (Fantasia Festival); 25 October 2019 (United Kingdom)
- Running time: 97 minutes
- Countries: United Kingdom; Belgium
- Language: English

A Good Woman Is Hard to Find is a 2019 crime thriller film directed by Abner Pastoll and written by Ronan Blaney. The film stars Sarah Bolger as a young, recently widowed mother who will go to any length to protect her children as she seeks the truth behind her husband's murder.

The film premiered at the Fantasia International Film Festival on 21 July 2019. It was released in the United Kingdom in cinemas and on Digital HD on 25 October 2019 by Signature Entertainment.

== Plot ==
Sarah Collins, a recently widowed young mother of two children, Ben and Lucy, is desperate to know who murdered her husband Stephen. Her son Ben has been an elective mute since the day he witnessed his father being knifed to death on their estate in the middle of the day. Police have done nothing to catch the killer, categorising his death as a falling-out amongst thieves.

One day, after ripping off local crime boss Leo Miller, Tito breaks into Sarah's flat, where he decides to stash the stolen drugs. Frightened senseless, Sarah wants nothing to do with this, but caught between a rock and a hard place, she sees an opportunity to use Tito to gain information about what might have happened to her husband with the hope of eventually returning to some semblance of a normal life.

Ben accidentally finds the drugs and also tries some. Upon finding that the drugs have been ruined, an irate Tito tries to rape Sarah, but she stabs him to death and disposes of his remains. Leo discovers that Tito was the one who stole his drugs and his connection to Sarah. Leo confronts Sarah and the children while they are out shopping. Ben runs away after seeing Leo and when Sarah catches up to him, he confirms that Leo was the one who killed his father. She later agrees to bring Tito to Leo.

Sarah goes to the nightclub to meet Leo, carrying with her Tito's head, and orders Leo to leave her and her family alone. When Leo does not comply, she kills Leo and his thugs after learning they killed Stephen for interfering in their business. The murders are dismissed as gang-related violence.

== Cast ==
- Sarah Bolger as Sarah
- Edward Hogg as Leo Miller
- Andrew Simpson as Tito
- Jane Brennan as Alice
- Caolan Byrne as Terry
- Packy Lee as Mackers
- Susan Ateh as Emily Scott
- Siobhan Kelly as Dr Rosa Brady
- Rudy Doherty as Ben, Sarah's son
- Macie McCauley as Lucy, Sarah's daughter
- Josh Bolt as Donal
- James McCaffrey as Conor
- Nigel O'Neill as PC Huxley
- Daryl McCormack as PC Reeves
- Sean Sloan as Jean
- Jo Donelly as Betty
- Mary Lindsay as Mandy
- Rafaela Dias as Dr Reid
- Diego Calderon Amargo as drunk Ray
- Shireen Azarmi as Sergeant Jones
- Gary Harper as bin man
- Daniel Gosling as news reporter

== Production ==
Shooting took place in Lisburn, Northern Ireland, and in Liège, Belgium.

== Reception ==
On Rotten Tomatoes, the film holds an approval rating of 92% based on 51 reviews, with an average rating of 7.3/10. The website's critics consensus reads: "A Good Woman Is Hard to Find, but it isn't difficult to see a star in the making while watching Sarah Bolger's powerful performance in this gritty thriller." On Metacritic, the film has a weighted average score of 65 out of 100, based on 7 critics, indicating "generally favorable reviews".
