= Abner Pastoll =

British film director

- Born: 12 February 1982 (age 43); Johannesburg, South Africa
- Occupations: Film director, screenwriter, film editor, film producer

Abner Pastoll (born 12 February 1982) is a British-South African film director, screenwriter, and editor, born in South Africa, where his family used to own a two-screen cinema. He is based in London, UK and Seoul, South Korea.

== Background ==
Abner started making films at the age of four, inspired primarily by his family's cinema, and his father's film and video equipment. He originally thought he wanted to become an actor, but soon discovered he preferred being behind the camera. He grew up in London.

== Career ==
Abner's feature directorial work includes A Good Woman Is Hard to Find (2019) and Road Games (2015), and short films such as Getaway Driver (2017) and Me or the Dog (2011). He is co-founder of production company February Films, which he runs with producer Junyoung Jang (co-producer of Korean film The Host).

In the summer of 2014, he shot the France-UK co-production Road Games (aka Fausse Route), starring Andrew Simpson, Joséphine de La Baume, Frédéric Pierrot and genre legend Barbara Crampton. The film has been described as a 'taut Euro thriller'. It world premiered in August 2015 at FrightFest in London, and was released theatrically in the US on 4 March 2016 by IFC Films to an overall positive reaction. Bloody Disgusting called it "a wonderful thriller; a layered character-driven narrative with great writing and equally-great tension – a very pleasant surprise". The film currently retains an 84% score on Rotten Tomatoes. Road Games holds the unique distinction of having played the UK's FrightFest two years in a row, at its world premiere in 2015 and a reprise the following year in 2016, when Abner did a live commentary with FrightFest director Alan Jones (film critic).

On 8 March 2017 (International Women's Day), it was announced by Deadline Hollywood that Abner was set to direct the crime-thriller A Good Woman Is Hard to Find from a script by Academy Award nominee and BAFTA winner Ronan Blaney, starring Sarah Bolger. He would also re-team with Andrew Simpson (actor) and Edward Hogg, who appeared in his earlier works. Filming completed in December 2017. A Good Woman Is Hard to Find debuted to huge acclaim and praise from critics and audiences alike. It world-premiered the 2019 Fantasia International Film Festival and went on to close the 20th anniversary of London's FrightFest (film festival). It opened day and date theatrically and on digital HD in the UK and Ireland on 25 October 2019 through Signature Entertainment and in the US on 8 May 2020 via Film Movement. The New York Times said "[Pastoll] layers gangland grift, domestic drama and female fury into a satisfying lasagna of mounting violence". The film has a rating of 92% on Rotten Tomatoes from 51 reviews.

Abner had been attached to direct the horror film Sunrise (2024), reuniting him with writer Ronan Blaney, and had described the film as a "new take on vampires". It is not known why he left the project.

His next known projects include a "kick-ass, sarcastic" action-thriller set in the Arizona desert, and a Korean-language action-thriller entitled Live and Die.

== Filmography ==
Feature Films
Year	Title	Director	Writer	Producer	Editor	Notes
2015	Road Games	Yes	Yes	Yes	Yes	
2019	A Good Woman Is Hard to Find	Yes	No	Yes	Yes	
TBA	Untitled Abner Pastoll Project	Yes	Yes	Yes	Yes	Plot kept under wraps.
TBA	Live and Die	Yes	Yes	Yes	No	A Korean-language thriller.
2025	Untitled Horror	Yes	Yes	Yes	Yes	

Short films
Year	Title	Director	Writer	Producer	Editor	Notes
1999	Inheritance	Yes	Yes	Yes	Yes	Also cinematographer
2008	Homicide: Division B	Yes	Yes	Yes	Yes	Also cinematographer
2010	A Great Mistake	Yes	Yes	Yes	Yes	Nominated Best Comedy Shanghai Film Festival
2011	Me or the Dog	Yes	No	Yes	Yes	Festival de Cannes, Coup de Coeur
2017	Getaway Driver	Yes	Yes	Yes	Yes	
2024	Rotation	Yes	Yes	Yes	Yes	Nominated for the 'Get Shorty' Audience Award at the 38th Fantasy Film Fest in Germany

Other works
Year	Title	Role	Notes
2002	Dead Man's Dream	Co-director, Co-writer	
2004	Shooting Shona	Co-director, Co-writer	
2006	In A Day	Editor	uncredited
2013	Action UK!	Writer, Director, Showrunner	Children's TV series
2013	A Long Way from Home	Executive Producer	Edinburgh Film Festival
2020	Shine Your Eyes	Associate Producer	Berlin Film Festival
2024	House of Ashes	Associate Producer	Brooklyn Horror Film Festival

== Awards and nominations ==
Year	Event	Award	Work	Result
2019	Molins Film Festival	"Being Different" Audience Award	A Good Woman Is Hard to Find	Won
2019	MOTELx - Festival Internacional de Cinema de Terror de Lisboa	Best European Feature Film Award / Méliès d'Argent	A Good Woman Is Hard to Find	Nominated
2019	Fantasy Filmfest	Fresh Blood Award for Best First or Second Feature	A Good Woman Is Hard to Find	Nominated
2019	FrightFest	Electric Shadows Award for Best Film	A Good Woman Is Hard to Find	Won
2020	Sombre Festival de Cine Fantástico Europeo de Murcia	Best Director	A Good Woman Is Hard to Find	Won
2024	Fantasy Filmfest	Get Shorty (Audience Award)	Rotation	Nominated
