= Sarah Bolger =

Irish actress (born 1991)

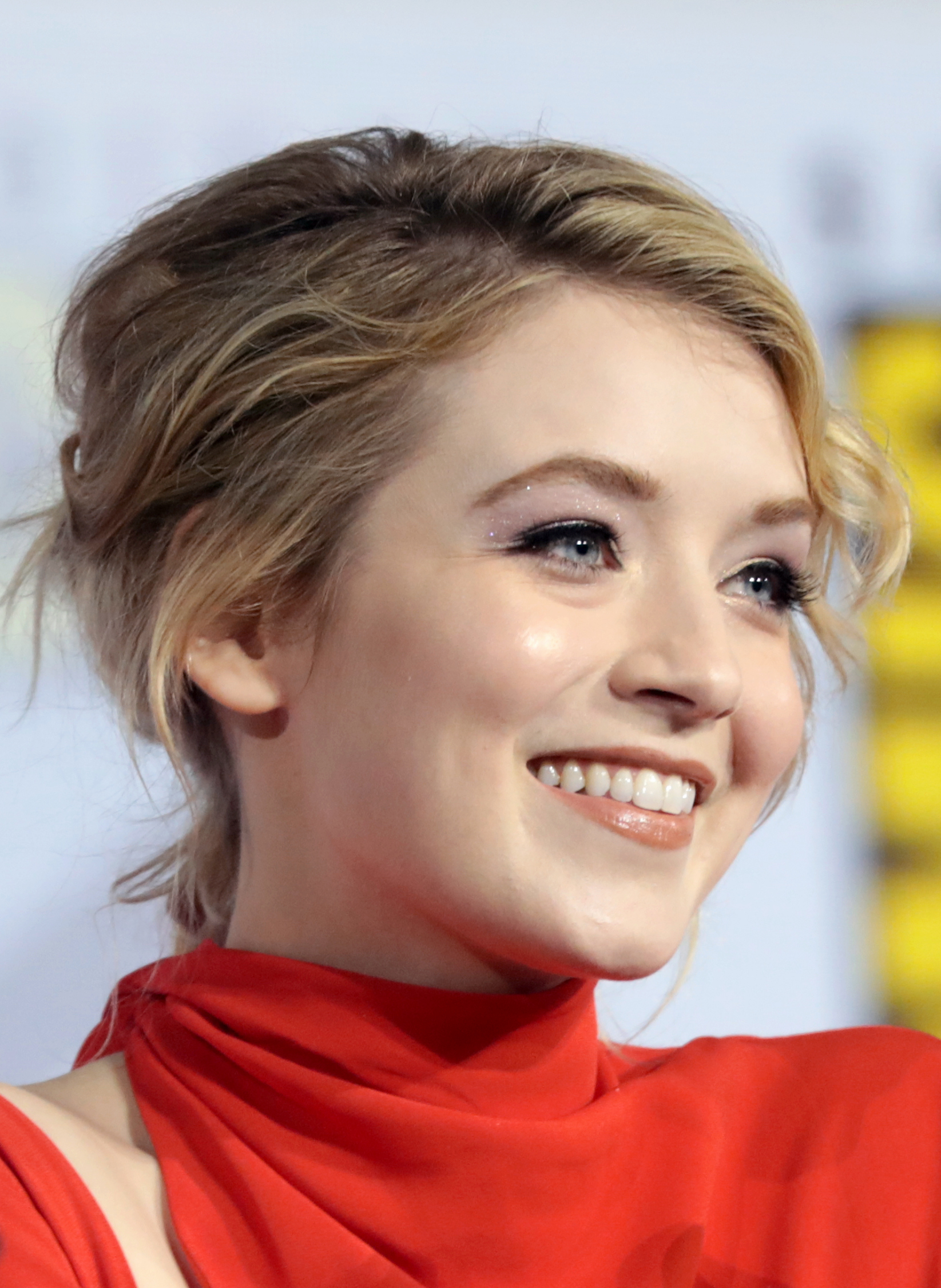
- Bolger in 2019
- Born: Sarah Lee Bolger; 28 February 1991 (age 35); Dublin, Ireland
- Occupation: Actress
- Years active: 1999–present
- Relatives: Emma Bolger (sister)

Sarah Lee Bolger (born 28 February 1991) is an Irish actress. She starred in the films In America (2003), Stormbreaker (2006), The Spiderwick Chronicles (2008), The Moth Diaries (2011), The Lazarus Effect (2015), Emelie (2015), and A Good Woman Is Hard to Find (2019). On television, she portrayed Princess Mary Tudor in The Tudors (2008–2010), for which she won an IFTA award, and Princess Aurora in Once Upon a Time (2012–2015). Bolger also appeared on the series Into the Badlands (2015–2017) and The Westies (2026) and starred on Mayans M.C. (2018–2023).

== Early life and education ==
Bolger was born in Dublin to father Derek, a butcher and mother Monica, a housewife. She grew up in the Southside suburb of Rathfarnham. Her younger sister, Emma, also acted and has since pursued academia.

Bolger attended Loreto High School Beaufort from 2003 to 2009 and took classes at Ann Kavanagh's Young People's Theatre.

== Career ==
Bolger starred in In America with her sister, Emma. From 2008 to 2010, she portrayed Princess Mary Tudor in The Tudors in her breakout role, for which she received critical acclaim. Bolger starred in Stormbreaker alongside Alex Pettyfer. She also starred in the film adaptation of the children's novel The Spiderwick Chronicles. She filmed a pilot called Locke & Key.

Bolger guest starred as Princess Aurora in the second, third, and fourth seasons of the fairy tale drama, Once Upon a Time.

Bolger played the female lead role, Umi, in the English version of the 2011 Studio Ghibli film From Up on Poppy Hill, and starred as Lucy in As Cool as I Am in 2013. In 2014, she made an appearance on TV series, Mixology. Bolger co-starred in David Gelb's thriller film The Lazarus Effect.

In 2015, she starred in the AMC martial arts show Into the Badlands and the Freddie Steinmark biopic My All American. In 2016, she starred as the title character in the horror film Emelie.

In March 2017, it was reported by Deadline Hollywood that Bolger was to star in the crime-thriller A Good Woman Is Hard to Find directed by Abner Pastoll. Filming completed in December 2017, with the film released in 2019.

== Other projects ==
In January 2011, Bolger was selected to be in photographer Kevin Abosch's project "The Face of Ireland" alongside other Irish celebrities including Sinéad O'Connor, Neil Jordan, and Pierce Brosnan.

== Filmography ==
=== Film ===
Year	Title	Role	Notes
1999	A Love Divided	Eileen Cloney	
2003	In America	Christy	
2005	Tara Road	Annie	
2006	Stormbreaker	Sabina Pleasure	
2008	The Spiderwick Chronicles	Mallory Grace	
2009	Iron Cross	Kashka	
2011	The Moth Diaries	Rebecca	
2011	From Up on Poppy Hill	Umi Matsuzaki	Voice role (English dub); Japanese title: Kokuriko-zaka kara
2013	Crush	Jules	
2013	As Cool as I Am	Lucy Diamond	
2014	Kiss Me	Zoe	
2015	My All American	Linda Wheeler	
2015	The Lazarus Effect	Eva	
2015	Emelie	Emelie	
2017	Halal Daddy	Maeve Logan	
2019	End of Sentence	Jewel	
2019	A Good Woman Is Hard to Find	Sarah	
2021	We Broke Up	Bea	
2024	Things Will Be Different	Vice Grip Right	
2025	Descendent	Andrea	
2026	The Lightkeeper	Maire	
TBA	Control	TBA	Filming
TBA	Fog City	Liza Orr	Filming

=== Television ===
Year	Title	Role	Notes
1999	A Secret Affair	Helena Fitzgerald	Television film
2002	The World of Tosh		TV series
2004	The Clinic	Janey Quinn	2 episodes
2006	Stardust	Lorraine Keegan	Miniseries
2008–2010	The Tudors	Mary Tudor	Recurring role (seasons 2–3); main role (season 4); 23 episodes
2012–2015	Once Upon a Time	Princess Aurora	Recurring role (seasons 2–4); 16 episodes
2014	Mixology	Janey	Episode: "Tom & Maya"
2015–2017	Into the Badlands	Jade	Main role (seasons 1–2)
2016	Agent Carter	Violet	Episodes: "The Lady in the Lake", "A View in the Dark", "The Atomic Job"
2018–2019	Counterpart	Anna Silk	Recurring role
2018–2023	Mayans M.C.	Emily Thomas	Main role
2024	Rematch	Helen Brock	Main role
2026	The Westies	Bridget Walsh	Main Role

=== Video games ===
Year	Title	Voice role	Notes
2008	The Spiderwick Chronicles	Mallory Grace	
2010	BioShock 2	Eleanor Lamb	

== Awards and nominations ==
Year	Work	Award	Category	Result	Ref.
2003	In America	Washington DC Area Film Critics Association Awards	Best Supporting Actress	Nominated	
2004	In America	Broadcast Film Critics Association Award	Best Young Actor/Actress	Nominated	
2004	In America	Chicago Film Critics Association Awards	Most Promising Performer	Nominated	
2004	In America	Independent Spirit Award	Best Supporting Female	Nominated	
2004	In America	Phoenix Film Critics Society Awards	Best Performance by Youth in a Lead or Supporting Role – Female	Nominated	
2004	In America	Satellite Award	Best Performance by an Actress in a Supporting Role, Drama	Nominated	
2004	In America	Screen Actors Guild Award	Outstanding Performance by a Cast in a Motion Picture	Nominated	
2009	Herself	Berlin International Film Festival	Shooting Stars Award	Won	
2009	The Spiderwick Chronicles	Irish Film & Television Awards	Actress in a Supporting Role – Film	Nominated	
2009	Herself	Chicago Film Critics Association Awards	Rising Star Award	Nominated	
2010	The Tudors	Irish Film & Television Awards	Actress in a Supporting Role – Television	Won	
2011	The Tudors	Irish Film & Television Awards	Actress in a Supporting Role – Television	Nominated	
2018	Halal Daddy	Irish Film & Television Awards	Actress in a Leading Role – Film	Nominated	
