= List of British films of 2026 =

This article lists British feature-length films and full-length documentaries that have their premiere in 2026 and were at least partly produced by the United Kingdom. It does not feature short films, medium-length films, made-for-TV films, pornographic films, filmed theater, VR films or interactive films, nor does it include films screened in film festivals in previous years that have theatrical premieres in 2026.

== British films box office ==
The highest-grossing independent British films released in 2026 according to the British Film Institute, by domestic box office gross revenue, are as follows:

=== In-Year releases ===
* Denotes films still running in cinemas worldwide

Highest-grossing U.K. independent films of 2026
Rank	Title	Distributor	Domestic gross (£m)
1	The Magic Faraway Tree	Entertainment Film Distributors	£15,100,000
2	Mother's Pride	Entertainment Film Distributors	£3,780,000
3	Shelter	Black Bear	£2,500,000
4	How to Make a Killing	StudioCanal	£2,040,000
5	H Is for Hawk	Lionsgate	£1,560,000
6	Return to Silent Hill	Entertainment Film Distributors	£1,050,000

==== UK qualifying films ====
Highest-grossing U.K. qualifying films of 2026
Rank	Title	Distributor	Domestic gross (£m)
1	Project Hail Mary	Sony	£34,700,000
2	Wuthering Heights	Warner Bros.	£25,300,000
3	Hamnet	Universal	£19,200,000
4	The Magic Faraway Tree	Entertainment Film Distributors	£15,100,000
5	The Sheep Detectives	Sony	£9,900,000

== Film premieres ==
=== January–March ===
Opening		Title	Cast and crew	Details	Ref.
J A N U A R Y	9	Becoming Victoria Wood	Director: Catherine Abbott	Dartmouth Films	
J A N U A R Y	16	28 Years Later: The Bone Temple	Director: Nia DaCosta; Cast: Ralph Fiennes, Jack O'Connell, Alfie Williams, Erin Kellyman, Chi Lewis-Parry, Aaron Taylor-Johnson, Cillian Murphy	Columbia Pictures / DNA Films	
J A N U A R Y	20	Shelter	Director: Ric Roman Waugh; Cast: Jason Statham, Bodhi Rae Breathnach, Naomi Ackie, Daniel Mays, Harriet Walter, Bill Nighy	Punch Palace Productions / Black Bear Pictures	
J A N U A R Y	22	Everybody to Kenmure Street	Director: Felipe Bustos Sierra	Barry Crerar / Screen Scotland / Al Jazeera English	
J A N U A R Y	22	Hanging by a Wire	Director: Mohammed Ali Naqvi		
J A N U A R Y	22	The Incomer	Director: Louis Paxton; Cast: Domhnall Gleeson, Gayle Rankin, Grant O'Rourke, Emun Elliott, Michelle Gomez, John Hannah	Pilea Pictures / BFI / Screen Scotland / Head Gear / Inevitable Pictures	
J A N U A R Y	22	Lady	Director: Olive Nwosu; Cast: Jessica Gabriel, Amanda Oruh, Tinuade Jemiseye, Bucci Franklin, Seun Kuti	HanWay Films	
J A N U A R Y	22	The Last First: Winter K2	Director: Amir Bar-Lev		
J A N U A R Y	23	Extra Geography	Director: Molly Manners; Cast: Marni Duggan, Galaxie Clear, Alice Englert	Brock Media / Film 4 / BFI	
J A N U A R Y	23	The Moment	Director: Aidan Zamiri; Cast: Charli XCX, Rosanna Arquette, Kate Berlant, Jamie Demetriou, Hailey Benton Gates, Isaac Powell, Alexander Skarsgård	A24 / Universal Pictures / 2AM / Studio365 / Good World	
J A N U A R Y	23	One in a Million	Director: Itab Azzam, Jack MacInnes		
J A N U A R Y	24	Birds of War	Director: Janay Boulos, Abd Alkader Habak	Dogwoof	
J A N U A R Y	24	Fing!	Director: Jeffrey Walker; Cast: Taika Waititi, David Walliams, Iona Bell, Mia Wasikowska, Penelope Wilton, Richard Roxburgh, Blake Harrison	Based on FING! by David Walliams; Sky Cinema / King Bert Productons / Story Bridge Films	
J A N U A R Y	24	Wicker	Director: Alex Huston Fischer, Eleanor Wilson; Cast: Olivia Colman, Alexander Skarsgård, Peter Dinklage, Elizabeth Debicki	Based on The Wicker Husband by Ursula Wills-Jones; BBC Storyville	
J A N U A R Y	25	Frank & Louis	Director: Petra Volpe; Cast: Kingsley Ben-Adir, Rob Morgan, Indira Varma, Rosalind Eleazar	Zodiac Pictures / Caspian Films	
J A N U A R Y	27	Antiheroine	Director: James Hall, Edward Lovelace	Dorothy Street Pictures	
F E B R U A R Y	6	Cold Storage	Director: Jonny Campbell; Cast: Georgina Campbell, Joe Keery, Sosie Bacon, Vanessa Redgrave, Lesley Manville, Liam Neeson	Samuel Goldwyn Films / StudioCanal	
F E B R U A R Y	13	Crime 101	Director: Bart Layton; Cast: Chris Hemsworth, Mark Ruffalo, Halle Berry, Barry Keoghan, Monica Barbaro, Corey Hawkins, Tate Donovan, Jennifer Jason Leigh, Nick Nolte	Metro-Goldwyn-Mayer / Raw / Working Title Films	
F E B R U A R Y	13	A Prayer for the Dying	Director: Dara Van Dusen; Cast: Johnny Flynn, John C. Reilly	Based on A Prayer for the Dying by Stewart O'Nan	
F E B R U A R Y	13	Sunny Dancer	Director: George Jaques; Cast: Bella Ramsey, Daniel Quinn-Toye, Ruby Stokes, Earl Cave, Jasmine Elcock, Conrad Khan, Jessica Gunning, James Norton	Night Train Media / 27 Ten Productions / Athenaeum Productions	
F E B R U A R Y	13	Wuthering Heights	Director: Emerald Fennell; Cast: Margot Robbie, Jacob Elordi, Hong Chau, Shazad Latif, Alison Oliver, Martin Clunes, Ewan Mitchell	Warner Bros. Pictures / MRC / LuckyChap Entertainment	
F E B R U A R Y	14	Animol	Director: Ashley Walters; Cast: Tut Nyuot, Vladyslav Baliuk, Sekou Diaby, Stephen Graham, Sharon Duncan-Brewster, Ryan Dean	Sky Original / Joi Productions / Film4 / Rogue State / SLNDA	
F E B R U A R Y	14	Nightborn	Director: Hanna Bergholm; Cast: Seidi Haarla, Rupert Grint, Pamela Tola, Pirkko Saisio		
F E B R U A R Y	14	Rosebush Pruning	Director: Karim Aïnouz; Cast: Riley Keough, Callum Turner, Jamie Bell, Elle Fanning, Pamela Anderson		
F E B R U A R Y	17	Queen at Sea	Director: Lance Hammer; Cast: Juliette Binoche, Tom Courtenay, Anna Calder-Marshall, Steven Cree, Florence Hunt		
F E B R U A R Y	20	The Dreadful	Director: Natasha Kermani; Cast: Kit Harington, Sophie Turner, Marcia Gay Harden, Laurence O'Fuarain, Jonathan Howard	True Brit Entertainment	
F E B R U A R Y	20	How to Make a Killing	Director: John Patton Ford; Cast: Glen Powell, Margaret Qualley, Jessica Henwick, Zach Woods, Topher Grace, Bill Camp, Ed Harris	StudioCanal / Blueprint Pictures	
F E B R U A R Y	27	500 Miles	Director: Morgan Matthews; Cast: Bill Nighy, Roman Griffin Davis, Dexter Sol Ansell, Maisie Williams	Based on Charlie and Me by Mark Lowery	
M A R C H	3	Effi o Blaenau	Director: Marc Evans; Cast: Leisa Gwenllian, Tom Rhys Harries, Nel Rhys Lewis, Owen Alun, Carys Gwilym, Gavin Lee Lewis	MetFilm Distribution / Creative Wales	
M A R C H	6	Peaky Blinders: The Immortal Man	Director: Tom Harper; Cast: Cillian Murphy, Rebecca Ferguson, Tim Roth, Sophie Rundle, Barry Keoghan, Stephen Graham	Based on Peaky Blinders by Steven Knight; Netflix	
M A R C H	16	DreamQuil	Director: Alex Prager; Cast: John C. Reilly, Elizabeth Banks, Juliette Lewis, Kathryn Newton, Sofia Boutella	Patriot Pictures / Landay Entertainment / Brownstone Productions / Arts & Sciences / Big Valley Pictures	
M A R C H	27	The Magic Faraway Tree	Director: Ben Gregor; Cast: Andrew Garfield, Claire Foy, Nicola Coughlan, Nonso Anozie, Jessica Gunning	Entertainment Film Distributors	

=== April–June ===
Opening		Title	Cast and crew	Details	Ref.
A P R I L	4	Flavia	Director: Bharat Nalluri; Cast: Molly Belle Wright, Martin Freeman, Jonathan Pryce, Toby Jones	Based on Flavia de Luce by Alan Bradley	Sky Cinema
A P R I L	24	Apex	Director: Baltasar Kormákur; Cast: Charlize Theron, Taron Egerton	Based on Flavia de Luce by Alan Bradley	Sky Cinema
M A Y	8	The Sheep Detectives	Director: Kyle Balda; Cast: Hugh Jackman, Emma Thompson, Nicholas Braun, Nicholas Galitzine, Molly Gordon, Hong Chau, Tosin Cole, Kobna Holdbrook-Smith, Bryan Cranston, Julia Louis-Dreyfus, Chris O'Dowd, Regina Hall, Patrick Stewart	Metro-Goldwyn-Mayer / Working Title Films / Lord Miller Productions	
M A Y	14	Fatherland	Director: Paweł Pawlikowski; Cast: Hanns Zischler, Sandra Hüller, August Diehl, Anna Madeley, Devid Striesow	Based on the life of Thomas and Erika Mann	
M A Y	16	Double Freedom	Director: Lisandro Alonso; Cast: Misael Saavedra, Catalina Saavedra		
M A Y	20	I See Buildings Fall Like Lightning	Director: Clio Barnard; Cast: Anthony Boyle, Joe Cole, Jay Lycurgo, Daryl McCormack, Lola Petticrew	Based on I See Buildings Fall Like Lightning by Keiran Goddard	
M A Y	21	The End of It	Director: Maria Martínez Bayona; Cast: Rebecca Hall, Noomi Rapace, Gael Garcia Bernal, Beanie Feldstein		
M A Y	21	Victorian Psycho	Director: Zachary Wigon; Cast: Maika Monroe, Thomasin McKenzie, Jason Isaacs	Based on Victorian Psycho by Virginia Feito	
M A Y	22	Finding Emily	Director: Alicia MacDonald; Cast: Angourie Rice, Spike Fearn, Minnie Driver	Universal Pictures / Working Title Films	
J U N E	3	Savage House	Director: Peter Glanz; Cast: Claire Foy, Richard E Grant, Bel Powley	Paramount Pictures / Record Player Films / Deluge Pictures	
J U N E	6	Only What We Carry	Director: Jamie Adams; Cast: Simon Pegg, Sofia Boutella, Charlotte Gainsbourg		
J U N E	9	Let's Love	Director: Jamie Adams; Cast: Martin Freeman, Josh Hutcherson, Malin Akerman, Jess Weixler		
J U N E	22	Rogue Trooper	Director: Duncan Jones; Cast: Aneurin Barnard, Hayley Atwell, Sean Bean, Matt Berry, Asa Butterfield, Jemaine Clement, Jack Lowden, Alice Lowe	Based on Rogue Trooper by Gerry Finley-Day and Dave Gibbons	

=== July–September ===
Opening		Title	Cast and crew	Details	Ref.
J U L Y	1	Enola Holmes 3	Director: Philip Barantini; Cast: Millie Bobby Brown, Louis Partridge, Himesh Patel, Sharon Duncan-Brewster, Henry Cavill, Helena Bonham Carter	Netflix; Based on The Enola Holmes Mysteries by Nancy Springer	
J U L Y	6	The Odyssey	Director: Christopher Nolan; Cast: Matt Damon, Tom Holland, Anne Hathaway, Zendaya, Lupita Nyong'o, Robert Pattinson, Charlize Theron, Jon Bernthal, Benny Safdie, John Leguizamo, Elliot Page, Himesh Patel, Mia Goth, Corey Hawkins	Universal Pictures / Syncopy Inc.	
J U L Y	17	Heartstopper Forever	Director: Wash Westmoreland; Cast: Kit Connor, Joe Locke, Yasmin Finney, William Gao	Netflix; Based on Heartstopper by Alice Oseman	
J U L Y	28	Wham! 10 Days in China	Director: Mike Christie; Cast: George Michael, Andrew Ridgeley	BBC, Sony Music Vision / Supercollider (a Zinc Media Company)	
A U G U S T	15	Mission	Director: Paul Wright; Cast: George Mackay, Rosy McEwen		
A U G U S T	21	Mutiny	Director: Jean-François Richet; Cast: Jason Statham, Annabelle Wallis, Roland Møller, Jason Wong, Arnas Fedaravicius, Adrian Lester	Lionsgate / Sky Cinema	
A U G U S T	28	The Dog Stars	Director: Ridley Scott; Cast: Jacob Elordi, Margaret Qualley, Josh Brolin, Guy Pearce, Benedict Wong	20th Century Studios / Scott Free Productions	
A U G U S T	28	Just Play Dead	Director: Martin Campbell; Cast: Samuel L. Jackson, Eva Green, María Pedraza		
S E P T E M B E R	2	Ink	Director: Danny Boyle; Cast: Guy Pearce, Jack O'Connell, Claire Foy	StudioCanal; Based on Ink by James Graham; StudioCanal	
S E P T E M B E R	2	Sumo: Spirit Weighs Nothing	Director: Erik Shirai; Cast: Terunofuji Haruo, Hiradoumi Yūki		
S E P T E M B E R	4	Elsinore	Director: Simon Stone; Cast: Andrew Scott, Olivia Colman	StudioCanal; Based on the life of Ian Charleson	
S E P T E M B E R	4	The Idiot(s)	Director: Małgorzata Szumowska, Michał Englert; Cast: Aimee Lou Wood, Johnny Flynn, Vicky Krieps, Christian Friedel	Based on The Gambler Wife: A True Story of Love, Risk and the Woman Who Saved Dostoyevsky by Andrew D. Kaufman	
S E P T E M B E R	4	A Long Winter	Director: Andrew Haigh; Cast: Fred Hechinger, Kit Connor, D'Pharaoh Woon-A-Tai, Ebon Moss-Bachrach, Caitríona Balfe	Based on the novel of the same name by Colm Tóibín; Mubi	
S E P T E M B E R	4	Queer Edward II	Director: Theo Rollason	About Derek Jarman	
S E P T E M B E R	4	Tender Loving Care	Director: Guy Nattiv; Cast: Kate O'Flynn, Marion Bailey, Paul Jesson	StudioCanal |	
S E P T E M B E R	5	Our Share of Sand	Director: Shalini Adnani; Cast: Maya Mehta, Mohammed Zeeshan Ayyub, Ellora Torchia	StudioCanal |	
S E P T E M B E R	8	Musk	Director: Alex Gibney; Cast: Justine Musk, Ashley St. Clair, Kara Swisher, Martin Eberhard, Zoë Schiffer	StudioCanal |	
S E P T E M B E R	10	Stuffed	Director: Theo Rhys; Cast: Jodie Comer, Harry Melling	Based on Stuffed by Theo Rhys	
S E P T E M B E R	10	Everybody Wants to Fuck Me	Director: Jonathan Schey; Cast: Taron Egerton, Jessica Henwick, Mia McKenna-Bruce, Charly Clive, Herbert Nordrum	StudioCanal	
S E P T E M B E R	11	The Uprising	Director: Paul Greengrass; Cast: Andrew Garfield, Jamie Bell, Stephen Dillane, Tom Hollander, Cosmo Jarvis, Jonny Lee Miller, Thomasin McKenzie, Woody Norman, Stanley Townsend, Katherine Waterston	Entertainment Film Distributors / Blumhouse Productions / Electric Shadow Company / Supernix / Thank You Pictures / FilmNation Entertainment	
S E P T E M B E R	11	The Face of Horror	Director: Anna Biller; Cast: Jonah Hauer-King, Kristine Froseth, Ellie Bamber, Leo Suter, Bella Heathcote, Ben Radcliffe	Based on Yotsuya Kaidan by Anonymous	
S E P T E M B E R	12	Masc	Director: Bertil Nilsson; Cast: Tega Alexander, Ed White, Reece King, Lincoln Conway, Robbie Bellekom	Amazon MGM Studios |	
S E P T E M B E R	12	Your Mother Your Mother Your Mother	Director: Bassam Tariq; Cast: Mahershala Ali, John Cho, Giancarlo Esposito, Abubakr Ali	Amazon MGM Studios |	
S E P T E M B E R	13	Prima Facie	Director: Susanna White; Cast: Cynthia Erivo, Daniel Ings, Simon Russell Beale, Elizabeth Dulau	Based on Prima Facie by Suzie Miller	
S E P T E M B E R	14	A Talent for Murder	Director: Anton Corbijn; Cast: Helen Mirren, Alden Ehrenreich, Olivia Cooke, Juliet Stevenson	Based on Switzerland by Joanna Murray-Smith	
S E P T E M B E R	14	The Liberation	Director: Guy Nattiv; Cast: Carrie Coon, Bella Ramsey, Odessa Young, Lily James		
S E P T E M B E R	18	Shaun the Sheep: The Beast of Mossy Bottom	Directors: Matthew Walker, Steve Cox; Cast: Justin Fletcher, John Sparkes, Nina Sosanya, Kate Harbour, Richard Webber, Emma Tate, Simon Greenall, Andy Nyman, Paul Whitehouse, Dani Dyer, Roman Kemp	Sky TV / Studiocanal Based on Shaun the Sheep by Nick Park Sequel to A Shaun the Sheep Movie: Farmageddon	
S E P T E M B E R	25	Sense and Sensibility	Director: Georgia Oakley; Cast: Daisy Edgar-Jones, Esmé Creed-Miles, George MacKay, Caitríona Balfe, Fiona Shaw, Frank Dillane	Focus Features / Working Title Films	

=== October–December ===
Opening		Title	Cast and crew	Details	Ref.
O C T O B E R	13	Frank and Percy	Director: Sean Mathias; Cast: Ian McKellen, Roger Allam, Stephen Fry, Jessica Gunning, Joanna Lumley, Derek Jacobi, Ncuti Gatwa		
O C T O B E R	15	Maserati: The Brothers	Director: Robert Moresco; Cast: Michele Morrone, Salvatore Esposito, Lorenzo De Moor, Anthony Hopkins	Based on the life of the Maserati brothers	
O C T O B E R	15	Artificial	Director: Luca Guadagnino; Cast: Andrew Garfield, Yura Borisov, Monica Barbaro, Cooper Hoffman, Jason Schwartzman	Based on the life of Sam Altman	
O C T O B E R	15	Klara and the Sun	Director: Taika Waititi; Cast: Jenna Ortega, Amy Adams, Mia Tharia, Aran Murphy, Steve Buscemi	Based on ‘‘Klara and the Sun’’ by Kazuo Ishiguro	
O C T O B E R	15	7 Miles Out	Director: Carol Morley; Cast: Lucy Halliday, Aidan Gillen, Gemma Whelan	Based on 7 Miles Out by Carol Morley	
O C T O B E R	23	Wife & Dog	Director: Guy Ritchie; Cast: Benedict Cumberbatch, Rosamund Pike, Cosmo Jarvis, James Norton	Black Bear Pictures	
N O V E M B E R	6	George Michael: The Faith Tour	Director: Andy Morahan, David Austin; Cast: George Michael	Mercury Studios	
N O V E M B E R	6	Wild Horse Nine	Director: Martin McDonagh; Cast: John Malkovich, Sam Rockwell, Steve Buscemi, Mariana di Girolamo, Ailín Salas, Tom Waits, Parker Posey	Searchlight Pictures / Blueprint Pictures / Film4 Productions	
D E C E M B E R	4	Above the Below	Director: Idris Elba, Martin Owen; Cast: Idris Elba, Caitlin FitzGerald, Hero Fiennes Tiffin	Lionsgate / Future Artists Entertainment	
D E C E M B E R	23	The Angry Birds Movie 3	Director: John Rice; Cast: Jason Sudeikis, Josh Gad, Rachel Bloom, Danny McBride, Anthony Padilla, Ian Hecox	Sega Sammy Group / Prime Focus Studios / One Cool Films / Dentsu	
D E C E M B E R	25	Werwulf	Director: Robert Eggers; Cast: Aaron Taylor-Johnson, Willem Dafoe, Lily-Rose Depp	Focus Features / Working Title Films	

=== Other premieres ===
Title	Director	Release date	Ref.
Cantona	David Tryhorn and Ben Nicholas	May 2026 (Cannes Film Festival)	
The Disciple	Joanna Natasegara	22 January 2026 (Sundance Film Festival)	
Douglas Gordon by Douglas Gordon	Finlay Pretsell	17 February 2026 (Berlin International Film Festival)	
The Education of Jane Cumming	Sophie Heldman	15 February 2026 (Berlin International Film Festival)	
Filipiñana	Rafael Manuel	23 January 2026 (Sundance Film Festival)	
A Gangster's Life	Zak Fenning	9 January 2026	
My Sister's Bones	Heidi Greensmith	30 January 2026	
Troublemaker: The Story Behind the Mandela Tapes	Antoine Fuqua	27 January 2026 (Sundance Film Festival)	
TUTU	Sam Pollard	16 February 2026 (Berlin International Film Festival)	
Wuthering Heights: The House of the Damned	Becca Hirani	16 October 2026	

=== TBA ===
Title	Cast and crew	Details	Ref.
Ali G: Who Iz I?	Director: Sacha Baron Cohen; Cast: Sacha Baron Cohen, Morgana Robinson, Stewart Rodeheaver	Working Title Films, Four by Two Films released by Amazon MGM Studios	
Billion Dollar Spy	Director: Amma Asante; Cast: Russell Crowe, Harry Lawtey, Vera Farmiga, Tony Goldwyn, Willa Fitzgerald, Rufus Sewell, Justin Theroux	HanWay Films; Based on The Billion Dollar Spy by David E. Hoffman	
Blood on Snow	Director: Cary Joji Fukunaga; Cast: Benedict Cumberbatch, Aaron Taylor-Johnson, Eva Green, Emma Laird, Ben Mendelsohn	Sky Cinema; Based on Blood on Snow by Jo Nesbø	
A Colt Is My Passport	Director: Gareth Evans; Cast: Ṣọpẹ́ Dìrísù, Tim Roth, Jack Reynor, Lucy Boynton, Burn Gorman	Amazon MGM Studios; Based on Tobosha by Shinji Fujiwara	
The Custom of the Country	Director: Josie Rourke; Cast: Sydney Sweeney, Leo Woodall	StudioCanal; Based on The Custom of the Country by Edith Wharton	
Elden Ring	Director: Alex Garland; Cast: Kit Connor, Cailee Spaeny, Ben Whishaw, Nick Offerman, Tom Burke, Havana Rose Liu, Sonoya Mizuno, Emma Laird	A24; Based on Elden Ring by FromSoftware	
Empire City	Director: Michael Matthews; Cast: Gerard Butler, Hayley Atwell, Omari Hardwick, Mel Jarnson		
Everybody Wants to Fuck Me	Director: Jonathan Schey; Cast: Taron Egerton, Jessica Henwick, Mia McKenna-Bruce, Charly Clive, Herbert Nordrum	StudioCanal	
Fortitude	Director: Simon West; Cast: Nicolas Cage, Matthew Goode, Ed Skrein, Alice Eve, Michael Sheen, Ben Kingsley		
The Housekeeper	Director: Richard Eyre; Cast: Caitríona Balfe, Emma Laird, Anthony Hopkins, Helena Bonham Carter	The Housekeeper by Rose Tremain	
The Last Disturbance of Madeline Hynde	Director: Kenneth Branagh; Cast: Jodie Comer, Patricia Arquette, Michael Sheen, Tom Bateman, Vicky McClure		
Lead Heads	Director: Giles Borg; Cast: Olatunji Ayofe, Rupert Everett, Tom Felton, Derek Jacobi, Luke Newberry, Mark Williams		
A Long Winter	Director: Andrew Haigh; Cast: Fred Hechinger, Kit Connor, D'Pharaoh Woon-A-Tai, Ebon Moss-Bachrach, Caitríona Balfe	Based on the novel of the same name by Colm Tóibín	
Mistletoe & Wine	Director: Jamie Adams; Cast: Charlotte Kirk, Ben McGregor, Jason Isaacs, Stefanie Martini, Tanya Burr		
Real Love (Yes, It's Real Love!)	Director: Jamie Adams; Cast: George Mackay, Rosy McEwen		
The Scurry	Director: Craig Roberts; Cast: Ella Purnell, Rhys Ifans, Paapa Essiedu, Antonia Thomas		
Sweet Dreams	Director: Carl Tibbetts; Cast: Gemma Arterton, Niamh Algar, Nick Frost		
Young Stalin	Director: Géla Babluani; Cosmo Jarvis	Based on Young Stalin by Simon Sebag Montefiore	

=== Culturally British films ===
The following list comprises films not produced by a British or UK film studio but is strongly associated with British culture. The films in this list should fulfil at least three of the following criteria:

- The film is adapted from a British source material.
- The story is at least partially set in the United Kingdom.
- The film was at least partially produced in the United Kingdom.
- Many of the film's cast and crew members are British.

Title	Country of origin	Adaptation	Story setting	Film locations	British cast and crew
Accused	India		London, England	UK	Christopher W Jones, Barbara Blum, Matylda McQuaid
The Drama	United States		England	United Kingdom	Robert Pattinson

== See also ==
- Lists of British films
- 2026 in film
- 2026 in British music
- 2026 in British radio
- 2026 in British television
- 2026 in the United Kingdom
- List of British films of 2025
