= The Best Christmas Pageant Ever =

1972 book by Barbara Robinson

- First edition
- Author: Barbara Robinson
- Illustrator: Judith Gwyn Brown
- Language: English
- Publisher: Harper & Row
- Publication date: 1972
- Publication place: United States
- Pages: 150
- ISBN: 0-06-025044-5
- OCLC: 588978
- Followed by: The Best School Year Ever

The Best Christmas Pageant Ever (titled The Worst Kids in the World in Australia, New Zealand, and the UK) is a children's novel written by Barbara Robinson in 1972. It tells the story of six misfit children who volunteer to star in their town's Sunday school Christmas pageant, and end up teaching the town the true meaning of Christmas.

== Summary ==
The book is narrated in first person perspective by Beth Bradley, daughter of Bob and Grace Bradley and big sister of a boy named Charlie.

Beth and Charlie go to the same school as the Herdman siblings: Ralph, Imogene, Leroy, Claude, Ollie, and Gladys. Born one year apart, the Herdmans are notorious for their misbehavior, including smoking, saying bad words, drinking jug wine, shoplifting, committing arson, and taking the name of the Lord in vain. They have never been disciplined because their father hopped on a train and never came back when Gladys was just a baby and their mother is always working multiple shifts to make ends meet. Despite their poor performance, the Herdmans steadily pass through elementary school (since holding any one of them back would mean having two or more of them in the same grade).

As the town gets ready for the holidays, Mrs. Bradley has been tasked with directing the annual Christmas pageant. When Charlie, who is a frequent target of the Herdmans' pranks, tells the sextet that the church offers free snacks during Sunday school, the siblings go for the first time and on the same day Mrs. Bradley is assigning roles for the Christmas pageant. To Mrs. Bradley and the Sunday school students' shock, all six Herdmans volunteer for the lead roles in the Christmas pageant: Mary (Imogene), Joseph (Ralph), the Three Wise Men (Leroy, Claude, and Ollie), and the Angel of the Lord (Gladys), the last of whom likens her role to a comic book superhero. Since they have bullied all the usual cast members into remaining silent during the call for volunteers, Mrs. Bradley has no choice but to cast them. An actual infant would be traditionally cast in the Christmas pageant as Jesus, but ever since the Herdmans took over the other major roles, all the local mothers with babies keep their children away out of fear, prompting Beth's mother to use a doll instead.

Having never heard the Christmas story before, the Herdmans take an uncharacteristic interest, through which Beth is surprised to find herself, and her parents, thinking more seriously about the story's harsher aspects: e.g., that the innkeeper forced a pregnant woman and her baby to sleep in a barn, and the Holy Family were on the run from King Herod, who wanted the baby Jesus killed.

Everyone in town is expecting the Christmas pageant to be a disaster: the Herdmans fight during rehearsal and Imogene's smoking in the women's bathroom leads someone into calling the firefighters out of the mistaken belief that the church is on fire and all inside evacuate. When the firefighters do arrive, they end up putting out an actual fire caused by a lit oven that had not been turned off during the chaos. The Reverend Hopkins tells Mrs. Bradley his shared concerns with the locals: the Herdmans don't have the Christmas spirit.

On the opening night of the Christmas pageant, the townsfolk are surprised by the Herdmans, whose unconventional performances actually make the whole show much more realistic and moving: instead of walking on and off stage like actors, the siblings are a little uncertain about where to go and what to do, as the real-life Holy Family and Wise Men must have been; instead of laying the doll Jesus in the manger, Imogene insists on holding it, as if it is really her child; the Wise Men choose to bring the baby Jesus a ham from the Herdmans' own gift basket instead of the "crummy" frankincense and myrrh from the story; the shepherds are sufficiently terrified of Gladys to look authentically awed by her announcement of Jesus' birth; and during the final scene, Beth looks over from the choir and is dumbstruck to see Imogene weeping softly while hugging the "baby". By common agreement, it is the best Christmas pageant the town has ever had.

== Characters ==
The Bradley Family

- Beth Bradley is the narrator of the book.
- Grace Bradley is Beth and Charlie's mother and the director of the Christmas pageant.
- Bob Bradley: Beth and Charlie's father.
- Charlie Bradley: Beth's younger brother.

The Herdman Siblings
Born one year apart, the Herdman siblings are a sextet of delinquents due to their father leaving them when the youngest was just a baby and their mother working multiple jobs, but never looking after them.

- Ralph Herdman is a ragged and scroungy firstborn of the bunch and eldest boy. He plays Joseph in the Christmas pageant.
- Imogene Herdman is a loud, bossy, and crafty secondborn of the bunch and eldest girl. She plays Mary in the Christmas pageant.
- Leroy Herdman is a tough and sure-of-himself thirdborn of the bunch. He plays one of the three Wise Men in the Christmas pageant.
- Claude Herdman is a tough and combative fourth born of the bunch. He plays one of the three Wise Men in the Christmas pageant.
- Ollie Herdman is a troublesome fifth born of the bunch, Claude's usual partner-in-crime, and youngest boy. He plays one of the three Wise Men in the Christmas pageant.
- Gladys Herdman is a feisty sixth born of the bunch and youngest girl. She plays the Angel of the Lord in the Christmas pageant.

Other characters
Other characters mentioned in the novel include teachers, the Reverend Hopkins, the town mothers, and the other children cast in the Christmas pageant.

== Publication and reception ==
Robinson first published the story in McCall's magazine before it was adapted into a book, which sold over 800,000 copies.

== Sequels ==
A sequel to The Best Christmas Pageant Ever, titled The Best School Year Ever, was published in 1994. It was followed by The Best Halloween Ever in 2004.

== Stage and screen adaptations ==
The book was adapted by Robinson into a play which was first performed on December 4, 1981 in West Chester, PA, and was first professionally performed on November 26, 1982, by the Seattle Children's Theatre.

The book was adapted into a television film on ABC in 1983, starring Loretta Swit and Fairuza Balk, then an unknown actress. Robinson also wrote the adaptation's teleplay.

A feature-length film adaptation of the book was released in 2024. Directed by Dallas Jenkins and starring Judy Greer, Pete Holmes, Molly Belle Wright, and Lauren Graham, the film was developed by Lionsgate and Kingdom Story Company.
