= The Best Christmas Pageant Ever (film) =

2024 film by Dallas Jenkins

- Theatrical release poster
- Directed by: Dallas Jenkins
- Screenplay by: Ryan Swanson; Platte Clark; Darin McDaniel
- Based on: The Best Christmas Pageant Ever by Barbara Robinson
- Produced by: Kevin Downes; Jon Erwin; Andrew Erwin; Darin McDaniel; Chet Thomas; Daryl Lefever
- Starring: Judy Greer; Pete Holmes; Molly Belle Wright; Lauren Graham
- Cinematography: C. Kim Miles
- Edited by: John Quinn
- Music by: Matthew S. Nelson; Dan Haseltine
- Production companies: Kingdom Story Company; Lumenas Studios; Fletchet Entertainment
- Distributed by: Lionsgate
- Release dates: November 2, 2024 (Los Angeles); November 8, 2024 (United States)
- Running time: 99 minutes
- Country: United States
- Language: English
- Budget: $10 million
- Box office: $40.3 million

The Best Christmas Pageant Ever is a 2024 American Christmas comedy drama film directed by Dallas Jenkins, based on the 1972 novel by Barbara Robinson. Starring Judy Greer, Pete Holmes, Molly Belle Wright, and Lauren Graham, the plot centers around the Herdmans, a group of juvenile delinquent siblings who have unexpectedly found themselves starring in their small town's Christmas pageant.

The Best Christmas Pageant Ever premiered at the Los Angeles Film Festival on November 2, 2024, and was released theatrically by Lionsgate on November 8, 2024. It received generally positive reviews from critics.

== Plot ==
In 1972, the Herdmans are six siblings with the reputation in the town for being the worst kids in the world. They are also labeled as juvenile delinquents who will most likely end up in jail. Beth Bradley, the narrator, selfishly prays that they would disappear until she can grow up and move away.

The Herdmans, in age order, are Ralph, Imogene, Leroy, Claude, Ollie, and Gladys. They are all bullies and thieves and generally make everyone in town miserable.

On the town Christmas pageant's 75th anniversary, Beth's housewife mom, Grace, volunteers to be in charge as the woman who usually runs it has broken both her legs. Beth's little brother Charlie tells his Herdman tormentor that at church they get treats and sweets, so the whole Herdman clan comes to Sunday school.

Surprisingly, they stay. But even more surprising, Imogene announces she will take the role of Mary in the local church pageant. She and her siblings offer themselves to take the biggest parts, bullying everyone else into silence. The shocked community is appalled that Grace gives them a chance to reform by letting them perform in the pageant.

At the first rehearsal, Grace reads everyone the Christmas story, sensing that the Herdmans are not familiar with it. They are outraged by the story, suggesting they include a King Herod to kill, so the first meeting is cut short when chaos erupts.

At the Bradleys' that night, they debate over the Herdmans' participation in the pageant. Beth's father Bob points out that the asked some valid questions, and that they will make the show more interestingly unpredictable. The next morning, he takes the family as he delivers hams for the food drive. Seeing the Herdmans excitement when they received theirs, Grace becomes determined to follow through with them in the pageant.

Imogene gets Beth to help her and her siblings to research the Christmas story in the library. To convince them to care about the pageant, Imogene points out it is an opportunity to live someone else's life, like actors in a movie.

The final dress rehearsal is chaotic. Imogene's brothers hide the baby, the choir is not in sync, a mother makes Imogene feel unworthy to be Mary, and then a fire alarm is pulled when a fire seems to break out in the bathroom, but it was actually a burning cake in the kitchen meant for the potluck. During the mayhem, Imogene overhears many there blame the Herdmans for the fire, so they disappear.

When Grace is not able to reach them by phone, Beth goes to confront Imogene, reminding her that Grace fought for them to have this opportunity, but Imogene remains non-committal. That evening, when Grace opens the Christmas pageant, she openly admits she has no idea how it will go. At the last minute, the Herdmans all arrive and give a unique authenticity to the pageant. As Mary, Imogene sheds real tears, and a moved audience show their appreciation with a standing ovation.

The movie then switches to the present where an older Beth is running an upcoming pageant; when she tells a group of kids about the Herdmans' pageant, they all become encouraged to participate.

We learn via postscript what happens with the Herdmans:

- Ollie is now a veterinarian who specializes in feline research.
- Claude is now a public school teacher.
- Leroy had a few stints in jail, but has been rehabilitated.
- Gladys is a flight attendant.
- Ralph is a pastor of the largest church in the Midwest.
- Imogene acted in a few movies before taking over the Christmas Pageant at Ralph's church. She is a mother of five.

== Cast ==
- Judy Greer as Grace Bradley, Beth's mother
- Pete Holmes as Bob Bradley, Beth's father
- Molly Belle Wright as Beth Bradley
  - Lauren Graham as Older Beth Bradley / The Narrator
- Sebastian Billingsley-Rodriguez as Charlie Bradley, Beth's younger brother
- Beatrice Schneider as Imogene Herdman
- Matthew Lamb as Claude Herdman
- Essek Moore as Ollie Herdman
- Kirk B. R. Woller as Reverend Hopkins
- Ewan Wood as Leroy Herdman
- Mason D. Nelligan as Ralph Herdman
- Kynlee Heiman as Gladys Herdman
- Nolan Grantham as Elmer Hopkins
- Lorelei Olivia Mote as Alice Wendelken
- Danielle Hoetmer as Mrs. Wendelken
- Vanessa Benavente as First-grade teacher
- Elizabeth Tabish as Mrs. Grady

== Production ==
In November 2023, it was reported that an adaptation of the 1972 children's novel was in the works at Lionsgate, with Dallas Jenkins directing the film. Principal photography began on December 6, 2023 in Winnipeg, Manitoba, Canada and wrapped on January 27, 2024.

Media Capital Technologies co-financed the film.

== Release ==
The Best Christmas Pageant Ever premiered in Los Angeles on November 2, 2024, and was released in the United States on November 8, 2024. It was previously scheduled for November 15, 2024 before moving forward a week earlier to avoid competition with another Christmas film, Red One.

== Reception ==
=== Box office ===
In the United States and Canada, The Best Christmas Pageant Ever was released alongside Heretic, Elevation, Weekend in Taipei, and the wide expansion of Anora, and was projected to gross $6–8 million from 3,020 theaters in its opening weekend, with some projections going as high as $10 million. The film made $5 million on its first day, which included $2.3 million and $500,000 from Sunday and Thursday night previews, respectively, for a total preview gross of $2.8 million. It went on to debut to $10.8 million, finishing in third behind holdover Venom: The Last Dance and Heretic. The film made $5.3 million in its second weekend (a drop of 51.3%) and then $3.5 million in its third, finishing in third and sixth place, respectively. Its total worldwide gross is $40.2 million.

=== Critical response ===
On the review aggregator website Rotten Tomatoes, 92% of 63 critics' reviews are positive, with an average rating of 7.1/10. The website's consensus reads: "Decking the halls with unflappable charm and sincere spiritual conviction, The Best Christmas Pageant Ever is winningly wholesome family entertainment." Metacritic, which uses a weighted average, assigned the film a score of 60 out of 100, based on 12 critics, indicating "mixed or average" reviews. Audiences surveyed by CinemaScore gave the film an average grade of "A" on an A+ to F scale, while those polled by PostTrak gave it an 88% overall positive score.
