= Black Box (2026 film) =

- Theatrical release poster
- Directed by: Steven Quale
- Screenplay by: Stephen Susco
- Based on: The Vessel by Clark Baker
- Produced by: David Haring; Christian Mercuri; Jonathan Oakes; Stephen Susco; Warren Zide
- Starring: Tom Brittney; Holly White; Boadicea Ricketts; Betsy-Blue English; Georgi S. Georgiev; Georgina Leonidas; Vaughn Johseph; Weronika Rosati; Cel Spellman
- Cinematography: Steven Quale
- Edited by: Steven Quale
- Music by: Raffertie
- Production companies: Capstone Pictures; Hammerstone Studios; Inzide Media
- Distributed by: Aura Entertainment; Signature Entertainment
- Release date: June 17, 2026
- Running time: 85 minutes
- Country: United States
- Language: English
- Budget: $10 million
- Box office: $431,285

Black Box (also known as Black Box: Flight 298) is a 2026 American horror thriller film written by Stephen Susco and directed, cinematographed and edited by Steven Quale. It stars Tom Brittney, Holly White, Boadicea Ricketts, Betsy-Blue English, Georgi S. Georgiev, Georgina Leonidas, Vaughn Johseph, Weronika Rosati, and Cel Spellman.

== Plot ==
Jeremy Durham is on Vero Airlines Flight 298 from Seattle to New Orleans, returning with the body of his girlfriend after she died on a hiking trip that they had taken together. Sitting in the back rows of economy class of the aircraft, Jeremy sees how an elderly, long-bearded man begins coughing nonstop, locking himself in the lavatory. A young girl named Chloe who is on the flight with her mother sits in the opposite row to Jeremy and starts a conversation while waiting to use the bathroom. The elderly passenger emerges from the stall and sits in his seat continuing to cough. He seemingly sees something outside the window, begins to panic; causing a disturbance aboard the plane. As he tries to exist the aircraft, he begins to cough up blood and dies. Shocked by the sudden death, the two flight attendants, and a female air marshal try to bring calm after the rest of the passengers begin showing symptoms of illness.

More than midway into the flight, air traffic control loses contact with the plane, which is engulfed by a dense cloud filled with aliens who attack and possess human bodies. When the creatures attempt to enter the aircraft, a young man who is travelling with two friends takes hold of the exit door and tries to keep it closed. However, one of the aliens gets through the toilet and into the first-class lavatory, attacking and infecting a passenger who subsequently opens the door and gives way to the aliens.

As the creatures kill most of the passengers, Jeremy, Chloe, Sarah (one of the flight attendants), the air marshal, and a young couple take refuge in the cargo area. However, an alien uses Chloe's mother's voice to trick her into opening the door, killing her and the other survivors, except for Jeremy and Sarah. Attempting an escape, Sarah parachutes off the plane but is abducted by the aliens and killed. Meanwhile, Jeremy sees his deceased wife's body, possessed by an alien, talking to him and trying to hug him. Jeremy manages to escape and returns to the passengers' area, seeing them all in their seats, staring at him in shock as he is bloodied and holding a hammer.

The air marshal, presumably infected, tries to stop Jeremy from storming the cockpit. Aware that they are not humans, Jeremy makes his way through to the cabin and kills the pilots, barricading himself inside and plunging the aircraft nose down with the intent to crash it. As the plane heads down, the automatic landing system activates, and the aeroplane makes a safe landing. Meanwhile, a SWAT team storms the aircraft and quickly subdues and arrests Jeremy, who sees the passengers and crew evacuating. A voice-over explains that they are hijacking planes and taking over human bodies because they are preparing for a future takeover of Earth.

== Cast ==
- Tom Brittney as Jeremy
- Holly White as Sarah
- Betsy-Blue English as Rachel
- Boadicea Ricketts as Dr. Aris
- Georgina Leonidas as Yasmin
- Cel Spellman as Asher
- Dane Whyte O'Hara as Pilot Davis
- Asa Ali as Taylor
- Kaja Chan as Chen
- Molly Belle Wright as Chloe

== Production ==
The film marks director Steven Quale's return to the survival horror genre, following his work on Final Destination 5 and the disaster film Into the Storm. The screenplay was penned by Stephen Susco, based on a 2012 short film concept The Vessel by Clark Baker. Quale took a highly hands-on approach to the production, serving not only as director but also as his own cinematographer and film editor.

Principal photography took place primarily on a specialized, enclosed airplane cabin set to maximize the film's claustrophobic atmosphere. The production was handled by Capstone Pictures, Hammerstone Studios, and Inzide Media.

== Release ==
The film had a limited U.S. theatrical release on June 17, 2026, and was released digitally on July 7, 2026, by Aura Entertainment.

== Reception ==
On the review aggregator website Rotten Tomatoes, 70% of 10 critics' reviews are positive, with an average rating of 5.80/10.

Leslie Felperin of The Guardian gave the film a rating of 2 out of 5 stars and wrote, "Low-budget chiller leans heavily on tinfoil-hat paranoia to build its reasonably effective suspense."

Karina Adelgaard of Heaven of Horror gave the film a positive feedback and a 3 over 5 rating and she said: ...I didn’t expect too much from this supernatural sci-fi horror fantasy hybrid, but it absolutely delivered more than I ever anticipated. I find myself wanting a sequel to dive deeper into the world-building presented, which is always a good thing.

Archika Khurana of The Times of India also gave the film a positive review and a 3 over 5 rating and wrote: Overall, Black Box is slick, atmospheric and occasionally unsettling, but its familiar premise, underdeveloped characters and uneven screenplay prevent it from rising above genre convention.
