= Young Artist Award =

Accolade honoring youth performers since 1979

- Current: 45th Young Artist Awards
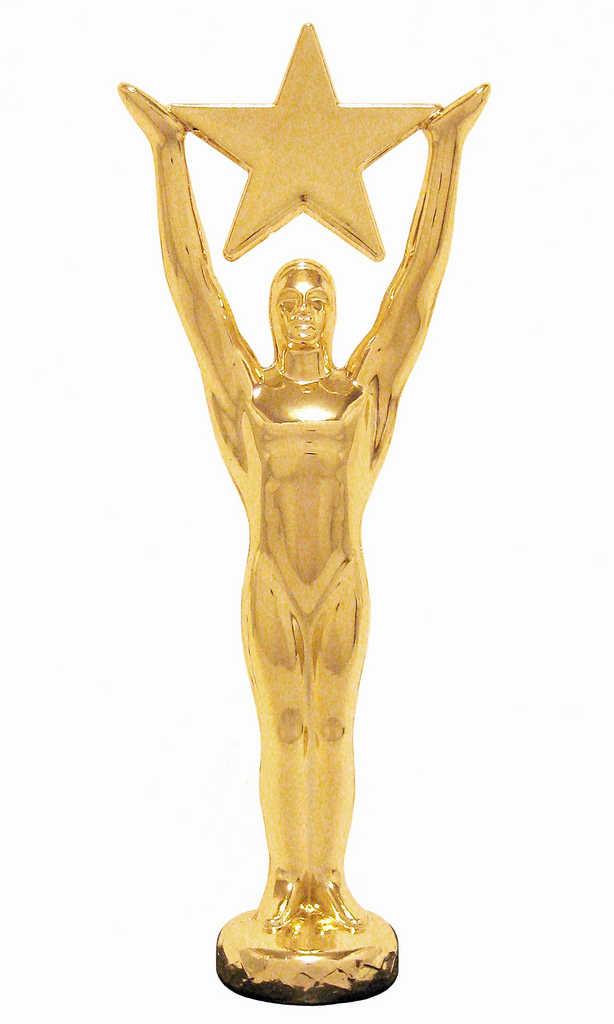
- The Young Artist Award statuette
- Awarded for: Excellence of young performers in film, television, theatre, and music
- Country: United States
- Presented by: Young Artist Foundation
- First award: October 1979; 47 years ago (as Youth in Film Award)
- Website: Young Artist Academy

The Young Artist Award (originally known as the Youth in Film Award) is an accolade presented by the Young Artist Foundation, an American nonprofit organization founded in 1978 to honor excellence of youth performers, and to provide scholarships for young artists who may be physically disabled or financially unstable.

First presented in 1979, the Young Artist Awards was the first organization established to specifically recognize and award the contributions of performers under the age of 18 in the fields of film, television, theater, and music.

The 1st Youth In Film Awards ceremony was held in October 1979, at the Sheraton Universal Hotel in Hollywood to honor outstanding young performers of the 1978/1979 season.

== Young Artist Association ==
The Young Artist Association (originally the Hollywood Women's Photo and Press Club, and later, the Youth in Film Association) is a non-profit organization founded in 1978 to recognize and award excellence of youth performers, and to provide scholarships for young artists who may be physically or financially challenged. The Young Artist Association was the first organization to establish an awards ceremony specifically set to recognize and award the contributions of performers under the age of 21 in the fields of film, television, theater, and music.

== Young Artist Foundation ==
The Young Artist Foundation is a non-profit 501(c) organization founded in 1978 by long-standing Hollywood Foreign Press (Golden Globes) member Maureen Dragone and dedicated to presenting scholarships to physically or financially challenged aspiring young artists, allowing them to pursue a career in entertainment by attending a performing arts school of their choice. The scholarship program is funded through donations including contribution from the Hollywood Foreign Press Association.

== Awards ==
=== History ===
The Young Artist Awards are presented annually by the Young Artist Association. Originally known as the Youth In Film Awards for the first 20 years, the name was officially changed to the Young Artist Awards for the 21st annual awards ceremony in March 2000. Playfully referred to as the "Kiddie Oscars", the Young Artist Awards are regarded as young Hollywood's answer to the Academy Awards, recognizing children for their work within the entertainment industry.

First presented for the 1978–1979 entertainment season, the awards were envisioned by Maureen Dragone, as a way to honor talented young people in film, television, and music who might otherwise be eclipsed by their adult co-stars. Two notable examples that year being young Ricky Schroder in The Champ and Justin Henry in Kramer vs. Kramer, who were each nominated for Golden Globes in the same categories as their adult counterparts.

Originally held in the autumn in its early years, the awards ceremony has traditionally taken place in the spring for more than 20 years.

=== Statuette ===
The original Youth In Film Award was a statuette was similar to a miniature Oscar. A gilded figure of a man holding a laurel wreath instead of a sword and standing upon a relatively large "trophy" style base. The current Young Artist Award statuette, is a figure displaying a five-pointed star above its head and standing upon a smaller base. In addition to the Young Artist Award statuette presented to the winners, all nominees are presented with a special nomination plaque at the ceremony, commemorating their nominations in their respective categories.

=== Voting ===
Candidates considered for nomination must be between the ages of 5 and 21 and are usually submitted for consideration by producers or by the young artist's agent or manager. Submissions are traditionally due by the end of January to mid-February and nominees are announced about one month later at an annual nomination ceremony and party. Originally conceived of as a way to acknowledge young artists under the age of 21, the focus of the awards has shifted over time to focus primarily on young artists who were under the age of 18 at the time of principal production of the project for which they are nominated.

Winners are selected by members of the Young Artist Association. Originally known as the Hollywood Women's Photo and Press Club, and later, the Youth in Film Association, the general membership was originally composed of 88 journalists and photographers, who were active in various branches of the arts. Today, the Young Artist Association has a voting board of over 125 members composed of journalists, agents, and former child performers. Winners are selected by secret ballot of all associated with the Young Artist Association as well as former nominees.

=== Categories ===
The various Young Artist Awards categories have evolved extensively since the first awards were presented. Originally beginning with only 11 competitive categories in 1979, the first categories included Best Juvenile Actor and Actress in a Motion Picture, Best Juvenile Actor and Actress in a TV Series or Special, Best Juvenile Actor and Actress in a Daytime TV Series, and Best Male and Female Juvenile Recording Artist, as well as competitive categories honoring studios and networks for "family friendly" films and television programming.

Over time, the competitive categories have been expanded to include "Best Young Actor and Actress in an International Feature Film", "Best Young Actor and Actress in a Short Film", "Best Young Supporting Actor and Actress in Film", "Best Young Ensemble Cast", "Best Young Recurring Actor and Actress in a TV Series", and "Best Young Guest-starring Actor and Actress in a TV Series", with many of the categories being split to acknowledge young artists age 10 and under in their own separate categories. In addition to its well-known film and television awards, the association has also recognized the achievements of youth in other fields of the performing arts over the years, including theater, dance, commercials, journalism, radio, and stand-up comedy.

=== Special awards ===
While many of the acting categories have been expanded over time, some early competitive categories such as "Best Juvenile Recording Artist", "Best Family Motion Picture", and "Best Family TV Series" have been phased out over the years, with accolades for those achievements now being bestowed in the form of special "Honorary" awards.

The foundation's most notable annual honorary awards include the "Jackie Coogan Award", often presented to film studios, producers, or directors for their "Outstanding Contribution To Youth Through Entertainment", and the "Former Child Star Award", presented as the foundation's "Lifetime Achievement Award" honoring former child stars for their achievements.

=== Ceremony ===
The ceremony is held annually in Hollywood and has traditionally been considered one of the more formal children's awards ceremonies, with honorees and their chaperones "dressing-up" for the occasion and arriving in limousines. All members of the press are invited to attend the pre-show red carpet arrivals as young celebrity attendees make their entrances and sign autographs, and each year's presenters are often selected from the previous year's young winners or from that year's list of nominees. After the ceremony is the annual banquet dinner and then dancing with live musical entertainment often provided by talented young musical artists of the day.

The first Youth In Film Awards were presented in October 1979 at a banquet ceremony held at the Sheraton Universal Hotel in Hollywood.

Youth In Film Awards / Young Artist Awards – Ceremonies
Ceremony	Year honored	Venue	City	Date
1st Youth in Film Awards	1978/1979	Sheraton Universal Hotel	Universal City, California	October 1979
2nd Youth in Film Awards	1979/1980	Sheraton Universal Hotel	Universal City	October 18, 1980
3rd Youth in Film Awards	1980/1981	(Unknown)	(Unknown)	December 1981
4th Youth in Film Awards	1981/1982	Sheraton Universal Hotel	Universal City	November 21, 1982
5th Youth in Film Awards	1982/1983	Beverly Hilton Hotel	Beverly Hills	December 4, 1983
6th Youth in Film Awards	1983/1984	(Unknown)	(Unknown)	December 2, 1984
7th Youth in Film Awards	1984/1985	Ambassador Hotel	Los Angeles	December 15, 1985
8th Youth in Film Awards	1985/1986	Ambassador Hotel	Los Angeles	November 22, 1986
9th Youth in Film Awards	1986/1987	Hollywood Palladium	Hollywood	December 5, 1987
10th Youth in Film Awards	1987/1988	Registry Hotel	Universal City	May 6, 1989
11th Youth in Film Awards	1988/1989	(Unknown)	(Unknown)	March/April 1990
12th Youth in Film Awards	1989/1990	(Unknown)	(Unknown)	Late 1990/Early 1991
13th Youth in Film Awards	1990/1991	Academy of Television Arts & Sciences	North Hollywood	December 1, 1991
14th Youth in Film Awards	1991/1992	Sportsmen's Lodge	Studio City	January 16, 1993
15th Youth in Film Awards	1992/1993	Sportsmen's Lodge	Studio City	February 5, 1994
16th Youth in Film Awards	1993/1994	Sportsmen's Lodge	Studio City	March 19, 1995
17th Youth in Film Awards	1994/1995	(Unknown)	(Unknown)	1996
18th Youth in Film Awards	1995/1996	(Unknown)	(Unknown)	1997
19th Youth in Film Awards	1996/1997	(Unknown)	(Unknown)	March 14, 1998
20th Youth in Film Awards	1997/1998	Sportsmen's Lodge	Studio City	March 6, 1999
21st Young Artist Awards	1998/1999	Sportsmen's Lodge	Studio City	March 19, 2000
22nd Young Artist Awards	1999/2000	Sportsmen's Lodge	Studio City	April 1, 2001
23rd Young Artist Awards	2000/2001	Sportsmen's Lodge	Studio City	April 7, 2002
24th Young Artist Awards	2002	Sportsmen's Lodge	Studio City	March 29, 2003
25th Young Artist Awards	2003	Sportsmen's Lodge	Studio City	May 8, 2004
26th Young Artist Awards	2004	Sportsmen's Lodge	Studio City	April 30, 2005
27th Young Artist Awards	2005	Sportsmen's Lodge	Studio City	March 25, 2006
28th Young Artist Awards	2006	Sportsmen's Lodge	Studio City	March 10, 2007
29th Young Artist Awards	2007	Sportsmen's Lodge	Studio City	March 30, 2008
30th Young Artist Awards	2008	Globe Theatre	Universal City	March 29, 2009
31st Young Artist Awards	2009	Beverly Garland Hotel	Studio City	April 11, 2010
32nd Young Artist Awards	2010	Sportsmen's Lodge	Studio City	March 13, 2011
33rd Young Artist Awards	2011	Sportsmen's Lodge	Studio City	May 6, 2012
34th Young Artist Awards	2012	Sportsmen's Lodge	Studio City	May 5, 2013
35th Young Artist Awards	2013	Sportsmen's Lodge	Studio City	May 4, 2014
36th Young Artist Awards	2014	Sportsmen's Lodge	Studio City	May 15, 2015
37th Young Artist Awards	2015	Sportsmen's Lodge	Studio City	Mar 13, 2016
38th Young Artist Awards	2016	Alex Theatre	Glendale, California	Mar 17, 2017
39th Young Artist Awards	2017	South Park Theatre	Los Angeles	July 14, 2018
40th Young Artist Awards	2018	Avalon Hollywood	Hollywood	July 14, 2019
41st Young Artist Awards	2019	Virtual	Online	November 24, 2020
42nd Young Artist Awards	2020	Virtual	Online	November 6, 2021
43rd Young Artist Awards	2021	Directors Guild of America	Los Angeles	October 2, 2022
44th Young Artist Awards	2022	Directors Guild of America	Los Angeles	July 21, 2024
45th Young Artist Awards	2023	Directors Guild of America	Los Angeles	July 21, 2024
46th Young Artist Awards	2024	Directors Guild of America	Los Angeles	July 19, 2025

== See also ==
- List of American television awards
- Academy Juvenile Award
- Broadcast Film Critics Association Award for Best Young Performer
- Saturn Award for Best Performance by a Younger Actor
