= Molly Belle Wright =

British actress

- Wright in 2025
- Born: September 2013 (age 13); Manchester, United Kingdom
- Citizenship: British
- Occupation: Actress
- Years active: 2021–present

Molly Belle Wright is a British actress. She is known for playing Ella in Cole Webley's drama Omaha (2025), which premiered in the U.S. Dramatic Competition at the 2025 Sundance Film Festival, and for taking the title role in Flavia (2026). Her other film credits include The Best Christmas Pageant Ever (2024), Deep Water (2026), and Black Box: Flight 298 (2026). At the age of seven, Wright delivered the TED Talk "How Every Child Can Thrive by Five". ABC News described her as the youngest person to deliver a TED Talk, and TED listed it as one of the most-watched talks of 2021.

== Early life ==
Wright was born in Manchester, England, and spent part of her childhood in Queensland, Australia. Wright became interested in acting after watching her mother, a former drama teacher, coach actors. In addition to her acting and public speaking work, Wright is a wildlife advocate and has devoted time to raising awareness and money for organisations such as the Currumbin Wildlife Sanctuary in Queensland.

== Acting career ==
Wright began acting in Queensland, Australia, first appearing on screen at the age of six in the 2021 feature film Kidnapped. The film was directed by Vic Sarin. Wright was then cast in the Australian crime drama Troppo, where she had the recurring role of Lilly alongside Thomas Jane and Radha Mitchell.

Roles followed in TV series Darby & Joan, Upright, and in feature films Christmas on the Farm, Mistletoe Ranch and True Spirit. In 2024, Wright was cast as the lead Beth Bradley in Kingdom Story Company/Lionsgate's The Best Christmas Pageant Ever, based on Barbara Robinson's best-selling book of the same name. The film was directed by The Chosen director Dallas Jenkins. The film was a commercial success, achieving box office revenue internationally of $40.7 million.

Wright followed it with the role of Ella in Omaha, opposite John Magaro. The film premiered at the 2025 Sundance Film Festival, where it featured in US Dramatic Competition. Reviewing the film for The Guardian, Adrian Horton called Wright "a remarkable newcomer", while Entertainment Weekly included Wright and Magaro in its selection of ten favourite performances from the festival. For Omaha, Wright received the Hamptons International Film Festival Special Jury Prize for Acting Performance, as well as the Richmond International Film Festival's Rising Star Actress award. Wright was also named as a breakout performer in IndieWire's list of 12 breakout performances of Sundance 2025.

Wright's later work includes season two of Nine Perfect Strangers. She starred alongside Ben Kingsley and Aaron Eckhart in Renny Harlin's survival thriller Deep Water (2026), playing Cora. She then appeared in the supernatural thriller Black Box: Flight 298. The film was directed by Final Destination 5 director Steven Quale. In 2026, Wright starred in the title role as Flavia de Luce in the film Flavia, alongside Martin Freeman, Toby Jones and Jonathan Pryce. The film follows Flavia de Luce as a keen detective and amateur chemist, and is based on Alan Bradley's mystery novels.

== Public speaking ==
Wright delivered "How Every Child Can Thrive by Five" for TED and Minderoo Foundation's Thrive by Five initiative. The talk argues for the importance of play and responsive interaction in early childhood development. It became TED's most popular talk of 2021 and has been translated into multiple languages. In 2023, she spoke at El Festival de Las Ideas in Puebla, Mexico. The presentation, to a live audience of conference attendees, explored reading and the power of books and stories. Also in 2023, Wright won the Outstanding Influencer: Youth Actress category at the 44th Young Artist Awards in Los Angeles.

== Filmography ==
=== Film ===
Year	Title	Role
2021	Kidnapped	Aria
2021	Christmas on the Farm	Young Emmy
2022	Mistletoe Ranch	Juniper Hunt
2023	True Spirit	Young Hannah
2024	The Best Christmas Pageant Ever	Beth Bradley
2025	Omaha	Ella
2026	Deep Water	Cora
2026	Flavia	Flavia de Luce
2026	Black Box: Flight 298	Chloe

=== Television ===
Year	Title	Role
2022	Troppo	Lilly
2022	Darby and Joan	Bella
2022	Upright	Young Meg
2025	Nine Perfect Strangers	Young Imogen

== Awards ==
Year	Association	Category	Work	Result	Ref
2023	Young Artist Awards	Outstanding Influencer: Youth Actress		Won	
2025	Richmond International Film Festival	Rising Star Actress Award	Omaha	Won	
2025	Hamptons International Film Festival	Special Jury Prize for Acting Performance	Omaha	Won	
