= Beatrice Schneider =

Canadian actress

- Occupation: Actress

Beatrice Schneider is a Canadian actress. She is known for playing Imogene Herdman in the film The Best Christmas Pageant Ever (2024), for which she received the Movieguide Grace Award for movie performance, and for her voice roles in animated series including Xavier Riddle and the Secret Museum and Carl the Collector.

== Career ==
=== Voice acting ===
Schneider began her career in animation voice-over. Her early credits include Abby Hatcher (Nickelodeon), Blue's Clues & You! (Nickelodeon), and Xavier Riddle and the Secret Museum (PBS Kids), in which she voiced several historical figures including Julia Child, Lucy Maud Montgomery, Hedy Lamarr and Billie Jean King. In 2021, she received an ACTRA Award nomination for Outstanding Performance – Female Voice for her portrayal of Julia Child in the episode "I Am Julia Child". Her later voice work includes Lydia in Snoopy Presents: It's the Small Things, Charlie Brown (Apple TV+), Emmy in PAW Patrol (Nickelodeon), and Arugula in Carl the Collector (PBS Kids), a main role across 23 episodes of the two-time Emmy-winning series.

=== Stage ===
In 2023, Schneider appeared as one of three child witches in Sir David McVicar's production of Macbeth at the Canadian Opera Company; the opera publication Schmopera praised the three young performers' "very creepy effect". The production received the Dora Mavor Moore Award for Outstanding Performance by an Ensemble in the opera division that year.

=== Television ===
Schneider's live-action television credits include The Lost Symbol (Peacock, 2021), a guest appearance in The Boys, and a recurring role as Willa in The Pradeeps of Pittsburgh, the Amazon Freevee comedy created by Vijal Patel. In 2024, she played the lead role of Abigail in "Plastic Smile", an episode of the horror anthology series Tales from the Void (Screambox) directed by John Adams and Toby Poser. The Geek Show described her work in the episode as "a stunning performance". In 2025, she guest-starred as young Gigi in the CBS series Watson.

=== Film ===
Schneider plays the young Klara in the science fiction feature Signal One, written and directed by Jonathan Sobol and starring Isabelle Fuhrman, Dennis Quaid, Josh Hutcherson and David Thewlis. The film was released in 2026.

Her breakthrough role came in 2024, when she was cast as Imogene Herdman in Dallas Jenkins's film adaptation of The Best Christmas Pageant Ever (Lionsgate). Her performance was singled out by critics: The New York Times wrote that Schneider made "a particularly strong — and yes, moving — showing as Imogene", while Deadline Hollywood called her "a wonderful Beatrice Schneider" who was "leading the pack" of the film's young cast, and RogerEbert.com found her "excellent in the story's most complicated role". The Hollywood Reporter noted that her performance "makes it easier to buy Imogene's transformation".

For the role, Schneider won the Grace Award for movie performance at the 32nd Movieguide Awards in February 2025. She also appeared in the independent feature Paige Darcy: Reluctant Detective (2025) as the young Paige.

== Filmography ==
=== Film ===
Year	Title	Role	Notes
2024	The Best Christmas Pageant Ever	Imogene Herdman	
2025	Paige Darcy: Reluctant Detective	Young Paige	
2026	Signal One	Young Klara	

=== Television ===
Year	Title	Role	Notes
2021	The Lost Symbol	Little Kat	1 episode
2021	Odd Squad	Agent Office Supplies	1 episode
2022	Christmas in Toyland	Granddaughter	Television film (Hallmark Channel)
2024	The Boys	Pigtailed girl	Guest appearance
2024	The Pradeeps of Pittsburgh	Willa	Recurring role, 6 episodes
2024	Tales from the Void	Abigail	Episode: "Plastic Smile"
2025	Watson	Young Gigi	Episode: "Take a Family History"
2025	Overcompensating	Danni	1 episode

=== Voice roles ===
Year	Title	Role	Notes
2019–2024	Xavier Riddle and the Secret Museum	Julia Child, Kate Warne, Harper and others	7 episodes; ACTRA Award nomination
2020–2021	Abby Hatcher	Sweet Pea	5 episodes
2020–2022	Blue's Clues & You!	Boo, Owl, Josh's Friend	4 episodes
2022	Snoopy Presents: It's the Small Things, Charlie Brown	Lydia	
2022	Pinecone & Pony	Fauna	2 episodes
2022–2023	PAW Patrol	Emmy	4 episodes
2024–present	Carl the Collector	Arugula	Main role, 23 episodes

== Awards and nominations ==
Year	Award	Category	Work	Result	Ref.
2021	ACTRA Awards (Toronto)	Outstanding Performance – Female Voice	Xavier Riddle and the Secret Museum	Nominated	
2025	Music City Film Critics' Association	Best Young Actress	The Best Christmas Pageant Ever	Nominated	
2025	Movieguide Awards	Grace Award for Movie Performance	The Best Christmas Pageant Ever	Won	
