= Deep Water (2026 film) =

2026 film by Renny Harlin

- Theatrical release poster
- Directed by: Renny Harlin
- Screenplay by: Pete Bridges; Shayne Armstrong; S.P. Krause; Damien Power
- Story by: Shayne Armstrong; S.P. Krause
- Produced by: Gene Simmons; Gary Hamilton; Volodymyr Aremenko; Grant Bradley; Dale G. Bradley; Neal Kingston; Robert Van Norden; Ryan Hamilton; Ying Ye; Adrián Guerra; Bob Yari
- Starring: Aaron Eckhart; Angus Sampson; Ben Kingsley; Lucy Barrett; Molly Belle Wright
- Cinematography: D.J. Stipsen
- Edited by: Geoff Lamb
- Music by: Fernando Velázquez
- Production companies: Magenta Light Studios; Arclight Films; Simmons/Hamilton Productions; Nostromo Pictures; Aristos Films; DW Film Holdings
- Distributed by: Magenta Light Studios (United States); Icon Film Distribution (Australia); DeAPlaneta (Spain)
- Release dates: April 10, 2026 (Sarasota Film Festival); May 1, 2026 (United States); July 13, 2026 (Australia); August 7, 2026 (Spain)
- Running time: 106 minutes
- Countries: Australia; United States; Spain
- Language: English
- Budget: $40 million
- Box office: $8 million

Deep Water is a 2026 survival film directed by Renny Harlin and starring Aaron Eckhart and Ben Kingsley. It follows an international flight that crashes in the Pacific Ocean, and the passengers and crew must work to survive a group of circling sharks.

The film premiered at the Sarasota Film Festival on April 10, 2026, and was released in theaters on May 1, 2026. It received mixed-to-positive reviews from critics.

== Plot ==
During Northeastern Airlines Flight 140, an international flight from Los Angeles to Shanghai, an improperly stowed power bank ignites a fire in the aircraft's cargo hold, leading to an explosion that ruptures the cabin and destroys an engine. As rows of passengers are ripped out of the plane, captain Rich and first officer Ben are forced to make an emergency ocean landing. The aircraft strikes a coral reef, separating the survivors into three sections of wreckage.

In the forward section, Rich is trapped in his seat and places Ben in command, ordering him to escape before the cockpit fills with water. Hoping to retrieve the aircraft's E.L.T locator from the middle section of wreckage, crew member Penny swims out alone, but Ben and young passenger Cora are unable to save her from a mako shark.

Ben and Cora reach the middle section, as does passenger Lilly, who is reunited with her esports teammate Sam, but sharks continue to attack. With fewer than thirty survivors left, Ben organizes them aboard two life rafts, and is forced to take charge against the selfish Dan and the aggressive Hutch. Dan loses the locator in the water, while Sam and Hutch are narrowly rescued after being swept away.

In the submerged tail section, crew member Zoe, Matt, Becky, and Cora’s stepbrother Finn are trapped in an air pocket. Swimming to the surface to find help, Matt encounters Cora’s father, but they are immediately attacked by a shark. Zoe decides they can no longer wait for rescue and encourages Finn and Becky to come with her. Becky decides to remain behind. As Finn and Zoe swim to the surface they find Matt's lifeless body. Becky in her final moments leaves a voicenote to her granddaughter thanking her for bringing happiness into her life. As Finn and Zoe break the surface, Zoe is mauled by a shark but she still manages to board the liferaft before collapsing. Finn stares over the side of the raft and falls into the water.

By nightfall, the survivors are located by a U.S. Navy rescue helicopter. A crew member is lowered into the water but quickly torn apart and is devoured by sharks, and the destablized helicopter crashes and capsizes a life raft. As they all scramble aboard the upturned raft, Dan pulls the air stewardess into the water where she is devoured by sharks as he clambers to safety. Cora is trapped on the wreckage, and a Chinese fishing boat is unable to reach the remaining raft due to the coral reef. Ben decides to brave the water to rescue Cora but whilst swimming back with Cora, they are surrounded by sharks. Ben manages to kill one with a flare gun. The slovenly Dan is knocked into the water and is eaten by sharks as the fishermen throw their catch into the water, successfully luring the predators away.

The survivors are rescued by the fishermen, and Sam and Lilly admit their feelings for each other. Cora uses Ben’s phone to locate her stepbrother’s tracking chip, finding Zoe and Finn alive. Having originally requested the flight to avoid facing his own son’s illness, Ben tells his family that he is coming home.

== Cast ==
- Aaron Eckhart as Ben
- Molly Belle Wright as Cora
- Angus Sampson as Dan
- Ben Kingsley as Rich
- Lucy Barrett as Penny
- Rose Zhao as Lilly
- Li Wenhan as Sam
- Lakota Johnson as Hutch
- Elijah Tamati as Finn
- Rarmian Newton as Jesse
- Madeleine West as Martine
- Mark Hadlow as Coach Dade
- Kelly Gale as Jaya
- Kate Fitzpatrick as Becky
- Richard Crouchley as Matt
- Ryan Bown as Declan
- Priya Jain as Check-In Agent
- Rob Kipa-Williams as Jim
- Jacqueline Lee Geurts as Hailey
- Michael Cardelle as Macey
- John De Luca as Hans

== Production ==
Following the release of Bait 3D, a sequel about a plane en route from China to Australia crashing in the Pacific Ocean under the title Deep Water was planned, but was scrapped in March 2014 due to "uncomfortable similarities" to the disappearance of Malaysia Airlines Flight 370.

In May 2023, however, it was announced that Gene Simmons, along with Arclight Films' chairman Gary Hamilton, had formed Simmons/Hamilton Productions, with the first film from the company being the previously shelved Deep Water with Renny Harlin set to direct.

By December of that year, Aaron Eckhart and Ben Kingsley were shooting scenes on the film in Gran Canaria with prior shooting done in New Zealand.

== Release ==
In February 2025, Magenta Light Studios acquired U.S. rights to the film. The film premiered at the Sarasota Film Festival on April 10, 2026, as the opening night film, and was wide released on May 1, 2026. Icon Film Distribution released the film digitally in Australia on July 13. DeAPlaneta scheduled a theatrical release in Spain for August 7, 2026.

== Reception ==
=== Box office ===
In its opening weekend the film ranked #8 at the U.S./Canadian box office, grossing $2,103,911 from 1,675 theaters for a per-screen average of $1,256. In its second weekend, the film dropped 63% to gross $780,274, while its third weekend saw the film drop out of the top 10 to #17 and its gross collapse 83% to $142,907.

=== Critical response ===
On the review aggregator website Rotten Tomatoes, 69% of 83 critics' reviews are positive, with an average rating of 5.9/10. The website's consensus reads: "Delivering good old-fashioned thrills thanks to director Renny Harlin's reliable genre instincts, Deep Water is an unapologetic B-movie that swims rather than sinks." Metacritic, which uses a weighted average, assigned the film a score of 53 out of 100, based on 16 critics, indicating "mixed or average" reviews. Audiences polled by CinemaScore gave the film a "B" on an A+ to F scale.

== See also ==
- Deep Blue Sea (1999 film), another shark film directed by Renny Harlin
- No Way Up, an oceanic plane crash survival movie with a similar premise
