= The Best Halloween Ever =

Book by Barbara Robinson

- Book cover
- Author: Barbara Robinson
- Language: English
- Genre: Novel, children's book
- Publisher: HarperCollins
- Publication date: 2004
- Publication place: United States
- Pages: 128
- ISBN: 0-06-027862-5
- Preceded by: The Best School Year Ever

The Best Halloween Ever! is a children's book by Barbara Robinson. It is the third and final installment in Robinson's series of books which feature the six troublesome Herdman siblings.

== Reception ==
Matt Berman of Common Sense Media describes the book as being "tame to the point of being lame", while Chris Sherman of Booklist says that "Robinson's suspenseful romp will delight fans of previous books".
