= Superfire (film) =

2002 disaster television film by Steven Quale

- Genre: Disaster
- Screenplay by: Michael Vickerman
- Story by: Richard Preston Jr. Douglas Preston
- Directed by: Steven Quale
- Composer: Russ Landau
- Countries of origin: United States; Canada; Germany; New Zealand
- Original language: English

Production
- Cinematography: William Wages
- Editor: Harry Hitner
- Running time: 210 minutes (with commercials); 174 minutes (without commercials)
- Production companies: Lions Gate Television Pictures; ABC; Epsilon TV Production; KirchMedia; Stephanie Germain Productions; Tandem Communications; Mandalay Television

Original release
- Network: ABC
- Release: April 2, 2002

Superfire is a 2002 American disaster television film directed by Steven Quale.

== Plot ==
After firefighter pilot Jim Merrick makes a mistake that costs the lives of 12 smokejumper colleagues, he becomes a disgrace and is reassigned to a town in Oregon. Due to his loss of reputation, most people are unwilling to listen when he tries to warn them of a fire encroaching on Portland, Oregon. The disaster involves multiple simultaneous forest fires that combine into a superfire threatening the city, and Jim and his new team must work to stop the disaster.

== Cast ==
- D.B. Sweeney as James Merrick
- Diane Farr as Sammy Kerns
- Chad Donella as Rob Torreck
- Ellen Muth as Jill Perkins
- Gedeon Burkhard as Reggie
- Craig McLachlan as Jack Skidder
- Wes Studi as Joe Nighttrail
- John Noble as Paul Baylis
- Katrina Hobbs as Kathy
- Kate Raison as Beth Perkins
- Jim McLarty as Reporter #2
- Lori Dungey as Base Despatcher
- Belinda Bentley as Receptionist
- Matthew Chamberlain as Jack
- Peter Feeney as Police Officer
- Latham Gaines as Dr. Simon Orr
- Morgan Palmer Hubbard as Elliott Ross
- Jimmy Keen as Peter
- Katherine Kennard as Jessica Bennett
- Michelle Langstone as Tracy Torrock
- Emma Lung as Angie
- Charles Mesure as Trent Holbrook
- Dan Mott as Sean
- Jon Palino as Reporter #1
- Ingrid Park as Janelle
- Anthony Ray Parker as Fire Captain
- Alex Reekers as Rachel
- Jay Bunyan as Dennis
- Kate Smeda as Village Child
- Ray Woolf as Dutch

== Production ==
In November 2000, it was announced that Lions Gate Television Pictures was planning to produce a film titled Superfire about an elite firefighter squad specifically for ABC. Filming was scheduled for the spring of 2001, and Stephen Quayle was announced as the director. The film was a co-production between Germany, Canada, New Zealand, and the United States. Filming took place in New Zealand, and the television film featured several New Zealand actors.

== Broadcast ==
The television film was broadcast on ABC on April 20, 2002. The television film had a rating of PG-13/TV-14.

== Home video release ==
Some versions of the DVD release of the film shortened the film to around an hour and a half. Other versions contained the full-length film.

== Reception ==
A review in the 2005 book VideoHound's Golden Movie Retriever by Jim Craddock and Gale Thomson called the film a "hackneyed heroes story."

In a review of the shortened DVD, the review site chasingthefrog.com gave the film a rating of 2 and a half out of 4 stars and a movie grade of C+, writing that it "turned out to be a relatively good-looking film, at least for a TV movie anyway. Sure, the special effects were noticeably not big budget, but I have to credit the filmmakers and say that they did a good job in making the fire scenes look believable. (There were clips from the bigger budget 1997 film "Dantes Peak" [sic] used to capture the massive fire.)"

== Accolades ==
The visual effects team of John Allardice, Steve Courtney, Sherry L. Hitch, John McGinley, George Port, Jonathan Rothbart, Mark Sadeghi, Lee Stringer, and Ron Thornton was nominated for the Primetime Emmy Award for Outstanding Special Visual Effects for a Miniseries, Movie or a Special at the 54th Primetime Emmy Awards in 2002.
