= Darby and Joan (TV series) =

Australian television series

- Genre: Cozy mystery; Crime drama; Comedy drama
- Created by: Phillip Gwynne; Glenys Rowe
- Starring: Bryan Brown; Greta Scacchi
- Music by: Kate Miller-Heidke, Keir Nuttall
- Country of origin: Australia
- Original language: English
- No. of seasons: 2
- No. of episodes: 14

Production
- Production locations: Queensland, Australia

Original release
- Network: Acorn TV
- Release: 8 August 2022 – 20 April 2025

Darby and Joan is an Australian cozy murder mystery, crime comedy drama television series starring Bryan Brown and Greta Scacchi about a retired Australian detective and an English nurse who work together to solve the mystery of her husband's recent death. The title alludes to the proverbial mutually devoted couple Darby and Joan. The series was announced in 2021 and began streaming on UKTV and Acorn TV from 8 August 2022. The eight part series was created by Glenys Rowe and Phillip Gwynne and filmed in Queensland across the Gold Coast, Scenic Rim, Redland City, North Stradbroke Island, Mount Isa and Cairns. On 7 June 2024 the series was renewed for a second series. The second series of the show began airing from 30 December 2024.

== Synopsis ==
Widowed English nurse Joan Kirkhope is on a quest to find answers about her husband's mysterious death, while ex-detective Jack Darby has taken to the open road to escape his past. But when they collide in the Australian outback and become drawn into a series of mysteries, this unlikely investigative duo soon realize the most intriguing puzzle they face is each other.

== Cast ==
=== Main ===
- Greta Scacchi as Joan Kirkhope
- Bryan Brown as Jack Darby
- Jolene Anderson as Detective Inspector Liz Darby, Jack Darby's daughter

=== Guests (Series 1) ===
- Heather Mitchell as Rosemary, Jack Darby’s ex-fiancée (3 episodes)
- Anna McGahan as Rebecca Kirkhope, Joan's daughter (S1 & 2)
- John Waters as Ian Kirkhope (in flashbacks), Joan's deceased husband
- Adrienne Pickering as Lucy Kirkhope (1 episode)
- Angie Milliken as Felicity Ann Kemp (1 episode)
- Caroline Gillmer as Denise (2 episodes)
- Casey Donovan as voice of Australian Sat Nav
- Christopher James Baker as Curtis (2 episodes)
- Kaarin Fairfax as Heidi (1 episode)
- Kerry Armstrong as Summer (2 episodes)
- Ling-Hsueh Tang as Cinta (1 episode)
- Peter O'Brien as Chris (1 episode)
- Rachel Ward as English Sat Nav (1 episode)
- Rarriwuy Hick as Tegan (1 episode)
- Robert Coleby as Ascher (1 episode)
- Steve Bisley as Declan Kemp (1 episode)
- Todd Lasance as Riley Harrington (1 episode)
- Todd MacDonald as Nick (1 episode)
- Molly Belle Wright as Bella (3 episodes)

=== Guests (Series 2) ===
- Sigrid Thornton as Miranda McNeil (6 episodes)
- Brett Climo as Mick Riley (5 episodes)
- John Jarratt as Bill Carlton
- Debra Lawrance as Anna Bairnsdale (1 episode)
- Miriama Smith as Sophie Bairnsdale (5 episodes)
- Pia Miranda as Silvia
- Gary Sweet as Ellory Malcolm (episode 1)
- Martin Sacks as Doug Malcolm (episode 1)
- Steve Bastoni as Chris Steele (5 episodes)
- Lisa Hensley as Maxine Nelson
- Marcus Graham as Dermot Lincoln
- Chris Haywood as Shane Cozens

== Episodes ==
=== Series 1 ===
No.	Title	Directed by	Written by	Original release date
1	"Episode 1"	David Caesar	Keith Thompson & Paul Bennett	8 August 2022
A shock collision forces Jack and Joan to travel together as her search for answers begins at a beachside paradise. But all is not as it seems when they realise that what appears to be a tragic accident is in fact, murder!
2	"Episode 2"	David Caesar	Andrew Anastasios	8 August 2022
Jack takes a detour to help a mate recover some stolen guns, whilst Joan begins to suspect that there’s more to Jack then he’s letting on.
3	"Episode 3"	Ben C. Lucas	Giula Sandler	15 August 2022
Overwhelmed by new details about her late husband, Joan finds herself alone and in danger during a spate of thefts at a caravan park.
4	"Episode 4"	Ben C. Lucas	David Hannam	15 August 2022
It’s Joan’s first Australian Christmas, and Jack and Joan quickly find themselves uncovering the truth of a scuba dive gone wrong.
5	"Episode 5"	Mairi Cameron	Paul Bennett	22 August 2022
Sparks fly in a small town pub where Jack and Joan find themselves working on New Year’s Eve. When a blaze breaks out, Jack and Joan are determined to discover who is really to blame.
6	"Episode 6"	Mairi Cameron	Adam Zwar	22 August 2022
Jack and Joan come face to face with Jack’s past when he’s asked to investigate a sports doping scandal. Meanwhile an increasingly concerned Rebecca takes drastic action for answers.
7	"Episode 7"	Jovita O'Shaughnessy	Beck Cole	29 August 2022
Jack and Joan's search for a missing boy is complicated by the arrival of Joan’s daughter and visions of a lost little girl.
8	"Episode 8"	Jovita O'Shaughnessy	Ainslie Clouston	29 August 2022
The return of familiar faces leaves Jack in hospital and enables Joan to put together the truth about her late husband. As one mystery is solved, an ominous threat from Jack’s policing days begins another.

=== Series 2 ===
No.	Title	Directed By	Written by	Release date	ABC release date	Viewers	Ref
9	"Episode 1"	Jovita O'Shaughnessy	David Hannam	30 December 2024	16 March 2025	689,000	
10	"Episode 2"	Jovita O'Shaughnessy	Andrew Anastasios	30 December 2024	23 March 2025	651,000	
11	"Episode 3"	Grant Brown	David Hannam	6 January 2025	30 March 2025	659,000	
12	"Episode 4"	Grant Brown	Giula Sandler	13 January 2025	6 April 2025	604,000	
13	"Episode 5"	Rachel Ward	Stephen Vagg	20 January 2025	13 April 2025	591,000	
14	"Episode 6"	Rachel Ward	Sarah Smith	27 January 2025	20 April 2025	513,000	
