= 45th Young Artist Awards =

2024 US film awards ceremony

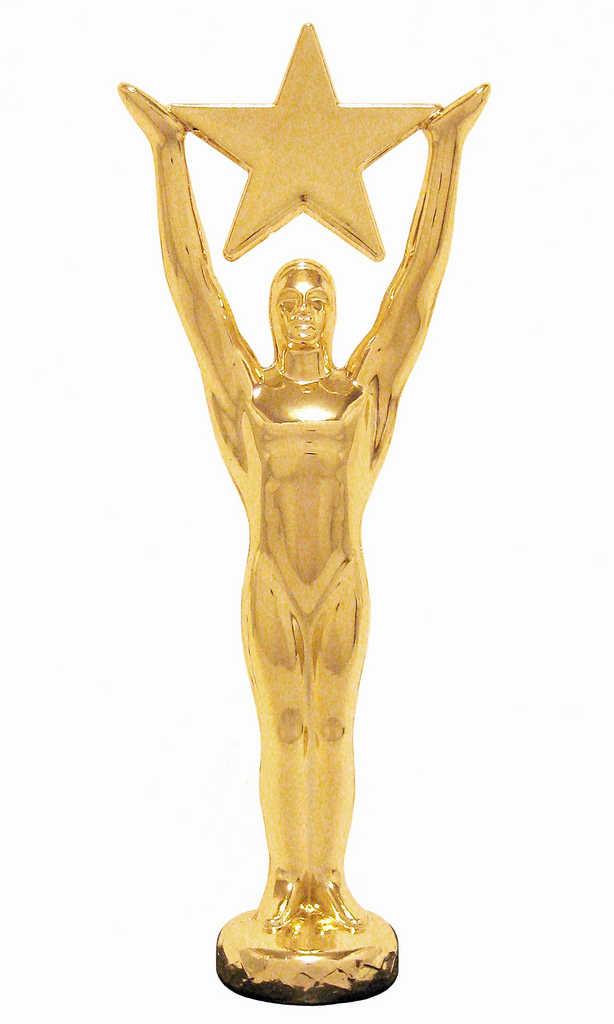
- Awarded for: Achievement during the year 2023 in film, television, streaming, and new media
- Date: July 21, 2024
- Site: Directors Guild of America
- Hosted by: Neal McDonough

The 45th Young Artist Awards ceremony, presented by the Young Artist Association, honored young performers between the ages of 5 and 18 for their achievements in 2023 in film, television, streaming, and new media.

Due to the 2023 SAG-AFTRA strike, the 44th and 45th Young Artist Award ceremonies were combined and took place on July 21st, 2024.

The ceremony was hosted by Neal McDonough.

== Winners and nominees ==
The winners are indicated in bold fonts.

=== Best Performance in a Feature Film ===
Best Performance in a Feature Film – Leading Teen Artist	Best Performance in a Feature Film – Leading Young Actor
**★ Brady Noon – Family Switch**: Catherine Cain – Prank Squad; Kylee Levien – Roswell Delirium	**★ Aaron Kingsley Adetola – A Thousand and One''**: Christian Convery – Cocaine Bear; Keir Tallman – Frybread Face and Me; Korwren – Pandemic Trilogy
Best Performance in a Feature Film – Leading Young Actress	Best Performance in a Feature Film – Supporting Teen Artist
**★ Charley Hogan – Frybread Face and Me**: Lilou Roy-Lanouette – Stampede (Rodéo); Remy Marthaller – Seagrass	**★ Olivia Ludwig – Prank Squad**: Aidan Kalechstein – Warrior Strong; Charles Cain – Prank Squad; Jennifer Hall – Prank Squad
Best Performance in a Feature Film – Supporting Young Artist	
**★ Emily Mitchell – Women Talking**: Bastian Fuentes – The Flash; Michael Sifain – Scars	

=== Best Performance in a Short Film ===
Best Performance in a Short Film – Teen Artist	Best Performance in a Short Film – Young Actor
**★ Grace Schnitzius – Maybe Tomorrow Will Be Better**: Austen Shane – Two Wrongs; Avery Garcia – It Happens At Night; Dariana Alvarez – Beautiful, Fl; Sarah Noelle Eastep – The Incident at the Bergen School; Huntly Plantz – Spirit of The Storm	**★ Eli D. Goss – Nothing, Except Everything**: Korwren – Teddy; Matéo Ray – See You At Sunrise; Michael Sifain – Broken Notes; Nathaniel Dickson – Dear Dad; Redding Munsell – Red, White And Blue
Best Performance in a Short Film – Young Actress	
**★ Scarlett Abinante – Two Chairs, Not One**: Aurora Iler – Grape; Ines Feghouli – The Skates	

=== Best Performance in a Streaming Film ===
Best Performance in a Streaming Film – Leading Youth Artist	Best Performance in a Streaming Film – Supporting Youth Artist
**★ Charlotte Delaney Riggs – One Summer**: Evan Whitten – Chupa; Tristan Riggs – Dante's Hotel	**★ Charlotte Delaney Riggs – Joe Haladin: The Case of the Missing Sister**: Ava Weiss – My Christmas Guide; Ellie Mae Smith – Twitter Files; Mégane Proulx – Frontiers

=== Best Performance in a Streaming Series ===
Best Performance in a Streaming Series – Leading Youth Artist	Best Performance in a Streaming Series – Supporting Young Actor
**★ Christian Convery – Sweet Tooth**: Alyla Browne – The Lost Flowers of Alice Hart; Colin O'Brien – Dear Edward	**★ Phoenix Nicholson – Awkward Conversations**: Gus Turner – Ted Lasso; Riley Looc – Lawmen: Bass Reeves
Best Performance in a Streaming Series – Recurring Youth Artist	Best Performance in a Streaming Series – Guest Youth Artist
**★ Michael Sifain – Primo**: Anais Jessica Berinde – Psyched!; Evan Whitten – Ahsoka; Fflyn Edwards – The Crown; Phierce Phoenix – Abbott Elementary; Ranen Navat – Rekindled Heartache	**★ Christian Convery – One Piece**: Bodhi Okuma Linton – Reservation Dogs; Cole Vernon – Silo; Remy Marthaller – The Night Agent; Robyn Betteridge – Willow

=== Best Performance in a TV Movie ===
Best Performance in a TV Movie – Teen Artist

**★ Reese Pucciano – The Happy Camper**

- Anais Jessica Berinde – Galwad 2052
- Huntly Plantz – Taken in Montana

=== Best Performance in a TV Series ===
Best Performance in a TV Series – Leading Youth Artist	Best Performance in a TV Series – Supporting Youth Artist
**★ Estovan Reizo Cheah – Sunny Side Up**: Édouard-B. Larocque – À propos d'Antoine; Estian Reiner Cheah – Whatever Will Be, Will Be; Laurence Ménard – Les yeux fermés	**★ Sienna Feghouli – FEM**: Ines Feghouli – Alert: Missing Persons Unit; Robyn Betteridge – The Gold
Best Performance in a Television Series – Guest Starring Teen Artist	Best Performance in a Television Series – Guest Starring Young Artist
**★ Skyler Elyse Philpot – Chicago Med**: Cassidy Nugent – Good Doctor; Emma Rose Smith – Mayfair Witches; Tristan Riggs – True Lies	**★ Remy Marthaller – When Calls The Heart**: Ashwin Sakthivel – Dodger; Eli D. Goss – Sesame Street; Luke Dietz – Ruby And The Well

=== Best Performance in a TV Commercial ===
Best Performance in a TV Commercial – Youth Actor	Best Performance in a TV Commercial – Youth Actress
**★ Estian Reiner Cheah – Toys-R-Us**: Dontae Nathan – Funko Games; Kingston Zelaya – Lexus Overnight; Matéo Ray – Walmart: Back To School 2023; Michael Sifain – Hyundai Tucson; Redding Munsell – Spidey Web-Spinners	**★ Charlotte Delaney Riggs – Proactiv**: Kalia Moorehead – Aquarium Of The Pacific; Kennedy Long – Silk Almondmilk; Sabrina Garcia – Scholastic Book Fairs: Iceberg

=== Best Voice Acting Role ===
Best Voice Acting Role – Youth Artist

**★ Christian Convery – Paw Patrol: The Mighty Movie**

- Ayush Rajmachikar – Ghee Happy
- Luke Dietz – Paw Patrol
- Nevin Kar – Not Quite Narwhal

=== Best Performance in a Music Video ===
Best Performance in a Music Video – Youth Artist

**★ Ranen Navat – New Jerusalem**

- Anais Jessica Berinde – Ethel
- Caroline Lobbin – Bathroom Drama
- Dontae Nathan – Waada

=== Outstanding Awards ===
Outstanding Music Vocalist – Youth Artist	Outstanding Music Single
**★ Melissa Marielle – All I Ask**: Caroline Lobbin – Bathroom Drama; First Day Of School – My Christmas Wish; Jensen Gering – Instant	**★ Walker Campbell – Gotta Move On**: Bowie Bundlie – April Rain; Estovan Reizo Cheah – Fly High; Jensen Gering – Instant; Summer Brennan – Billboard City
Outstanding Writer	Outstanding Director
**★ Sarah Noelle Eastep – SYOTOS**: Eliana Hamilton – Lift; Scott Lee – Lost But Not Forgotten	**★ Kyle Ward – Richland**: Caroline Lobbin – Bathroom Drama; Loni Briggs – Increase Teacher Pay
