= 44th Young Artist Awards =

2024 US media awards ceremony

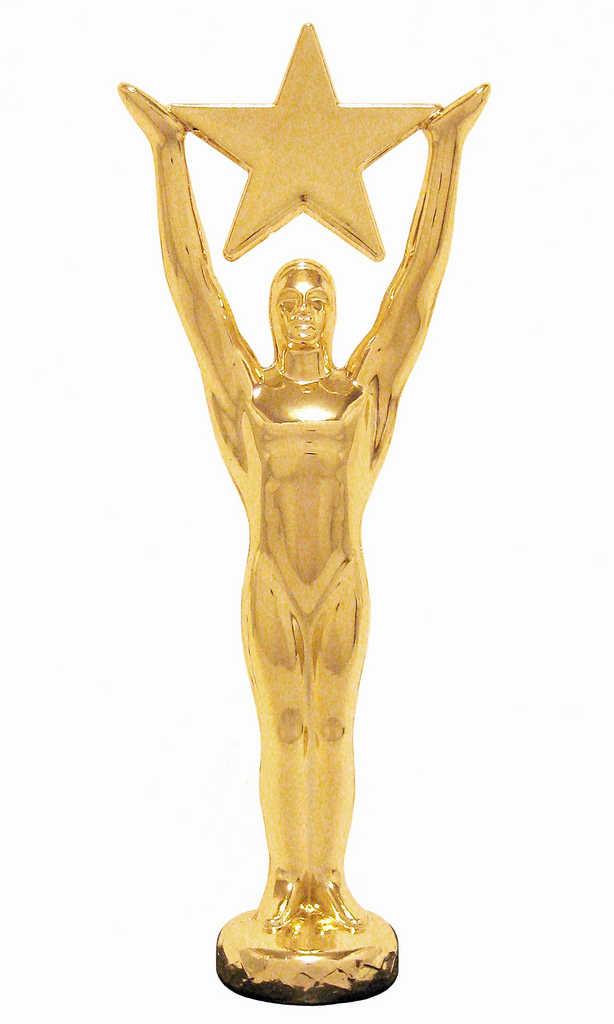
- Awarded for: Achievement during the year 2022 in film, television, streaming, and new media
- Date: July 21, 2024
- Site: Directors Guild of America
- Hosted by: Neal McDonough

The 44th Young Artist Awards ceremony, presented by the Young Artist Association, honored excellence of young performers between the ages of 5 and 18 for achievements in 2022 in film, television, streaming, and new media. Winners and nominees are listed below.

Due to the 2023 SAG-AFTRA strike, the 44th and 45th Young Artist Award ceremonies were combined and took place on July 21st, 2024.

== Winners and nominees ==
=== Best Performance in a Feature Film ===
Best Performance in a Feature Film – Leading Teen Artist	Best Performance in a Feature Film – Leading Young Actor
★ Charlotte Delaney Riggs – Forever and A Day: Javon Walton – Samaritan; Sunny Pawar – The Tiger's Nest	★ Estian Reiner Cheah – Reunion Dinner: Evan Whitten – Mona Lisa and The Blood Moon; Thom Nemer – Packed
Best Performance in a Feature Film – Leading Young Actress	Best Performance in a Feature Film – Supporting Teen Artist
★ Alisha Weir – Roald Dahl's Matilda the Musical: Alexa C Miller – Jikirag; Skyler Elyse Philpot – Where's Rose	★ Catherine Cain – Santa's Second Wife: Fflyn Edwards – Save the Cinema; Madison Ross – Santa's Second Wife
Best Performance in a Feature Film – Supporting Young Actor	Best Performance in a Feature Film – Supporting Young Actress
★ Bastian Fuentes – Jurassic World: Dominion: Jasper Burger – Santa's Second Wife; Mason Wilson – Jacob, Broken By God	★ Skyler Elyse Philpot – Playing Through: Ava Weiss – Moonfall; Gabriella Sengos – Blacklight

=== Best Performance in a Short Film ===
Best Performance in a Short Film – Teen Artist	Best Performance in a Short Film – Young Actor
★ Lacey Caroline – Worm Radio: Avery Garcia – Someone's In The House; Kailyn Andrews – The Intentionality of Inclusion; Owen Osborne – Baker Hotel; Samantha Weber – Hot Tears; Trinity Johnston – My Soul to Keep	★ Tristan Riggs – Safe and Sound: Jude Michael Rodricks – Rising Lotus; Kingston Zelaya – Malleable; Korwren – Mamita; Mason Wilson – Husky
Best Performance in a Short Film – Young Actress	
★ Kayden Tokarski – Bombay Beach: Ava Michele Hyl – Someone's In The House; Ellivia Gold – Planting an Unwanted Seed; Isabella Rese – Have You Checked The Children?; Kori Michelle – Wednesday's Child	

=== Best Performance in a Streaming Film ===
Best Performance in a Streaming Film – Leading Teen Artist	Best Performance in a Streaming Film – Leading Young Artist
★ Marlow Barkley – Slumberland: Aryan Simhadri – Cheaper By The Dozen; Jake Satow – Saving Christmas Spirit	★ Tristan Riggs – My Father's Day: Huck Whittle – Jessie and the Elf Boy; Jude Michael Rodricks – Donut Kid
Best Performance in a Streaming Film – Supporting Teen Artist	Best Performance in a Streaming Film – Supporting Young Artist
★ Aryan Simhadri – Trevor: The Musical: Brayden Eaton – Pursuit of Freedom; Jake Satow – Adeline; Lacey Caroline – The Rush Call; Mia Denae' Brathwaite – Crescent Gang; Shanel Cheatham – Lily Darling	★ Sebastian Billingsley-Rodriguez – Bed Rest: Aurelia Birchard – Donut Kid; Hanalei Whittle – Jessie and the Elf Boy; Jesse Gervasi – Ivy and Bean; Robert Levey II – 1 Up; Toby Larsen – A Christmas Mystery

=== Best Performance in a Streaming Series ===
Best Performance in a Streaming Series – Leading Youth Artist	Best Performance in a Streaming Series – Supporting Teen Actor
★ Charlotte Delaney Riggs – Austin High: Kori Michelle – Generation Hope; Phierce Phoenix – Skully & the Mole Crack the Case; Raphael Alejandro – Acapulco	★ Javon Walton – The Umbrella Academy: Walker Campbell – Camp Radio; Wesley Kimmel – The Book of Boba Fett
Best Performance in a Streaming Series – Supporting Young Actor	Best Performance in a Streaming Series – Supporting Teen Actress
★ Tristan Riggs – Best Foot Forward: Jahleel Kamara – Manifest; Roger Dale Floyd – Stranger Things	★ Trinity Jo-Li Bliss – Best Foot Forward: Ariana Neal – Archive 81; Lacey Caroline – Ugly Stik
Best Performance in a Streaming Series – Supporting Young Actress	Best Performance in a Streaming Series – Recurring Youth Artist
★ Hendrix Yancey – A Friend of the Family: Indica Watson – The Midwich Cuckoos; Jaxon Rose Moore – Archive 81	★ Skyler Elyse Philpot – Raising Dion: Owen Osborne – Dot Conner: Webtective; Temi Blaev – Litvinenko
Best Performance in a Streaming Series – Guest Youth Artist	
★ Lilah Fitzgerald – Devil In Ohio: Jake Satow – The Dropout; Kayden Tokarski – Gaslit; Remy Marthaller – Firefly Lane	

=== Best Performance in a TV Movie ===
Best Performance in a TV Movie – Teen Artist	Best Performance in a TV Movie – Young Artist
★ Lilah Fitzgerald – Monster High: the Movie: Cassidy Nugent – Big Sky River; Jensen Gering – Wickensburg	★ Ava Weiss – Lemonade Stand Romance: Alyssa Gervasi – Feeling Butterflies; David Kohlsmith – The Great Christmas Switch

=== Best Performance in a TV Series ===
Best Performance in a TV Series – Leading Youth Artist	Best Performance in a TV Series – Supporting Youth Artist
★ Estovan Reizo Cheah – Hello Hooman: Scarlett Archer – FYI Investigates: Escape From Ukraine; Tilly Kaye – Biff & Chip	★ Simon Webster – From: Antonio Jones II – A Black Lady Sketch Show; Farah Felisbret – Everything's Trash
Best Performance in a Television Series – Guest Starring Teen Artist	Best Performance in a Television Series – Guest Starring Youth Actor
★ Elle Graper – NCIS: Bradley Bundlie – The Kelly Clarkson Show; Zane Moyer – All American: Homecoming	★ David Kohlsmith – SurrealEstate: Bowie Bundlie – The Kelly Clarkson Show; Cole Vernon – Dodger; Liam Quiring-Nkindi – Holly Hobbie; Zylen Arnaud – Abbott Elementary
Best Performance in a Television Series – Guest Starring Youth Actress	Best Performance in a Television Series – Recurring Teen Artist
★ Remy Marthaller – Two Sentence Horror Stories: Nia Rush – Rock Island Mysteries; Rileigh Eames – Naomi	★ Caleb Black – The Wonder Years: Hannah Bos – Riverdale; Scarlett Archer – Sky Kids FYI: Weekly News
Best Performance in a Television Series – Recurring Youth Artist	
★ David Kohlsmith – Chucky: Kesler Talbot – Resident Alien; Zacary St-Pierre – Anna et Arnaud	

=== Best Performance in a TV Commercial ===
Best Performance in a TV Commercial – Youth Artist

★ Charlotte Delaney Riggs – Famous Footwear

- Ayush Rajmachikar – Hershey
- Boe Smith – LuvBug Learning
- Liam Quiring-Nkindi – The All-New Honda CRV
- Maddox Simmons – Peacock: Homecoming

=== Best Voice Acting Role ===
Best Voice Acting Role – Youth Artist

★ Phierce Phoenix – Noggin Knows: Bubble Guppies

- Maya Jai Pinson – My Imaginary Teacher
- Owen Osborne – The Adventures of Cairo
- Sebastian Billingsley-Rodriguez – Deepa and Anoop

=== Best Performance in a Music Video ===
Best Performance in a Music Video – Teen Artist	Best Performance in a Music Video – Young Artist
★ Tristan Riggs – Lone Star Blues: Kacey Fifield – Toxic; Phierce Phoenix – Miscast22; Walker Campbell – Stacy's Mom	★ Jude Michael Rodricks – Cover Up: Jax Binkert – Vegas; Ranen Navat – Winner

=== Outstanding Awards ===
Outstanding Music Vocalist – Teen Artist	Outstanding Music Vocalist – Young Artist
★ Robert Levey II – Perfect Symphony: Jael Wena – Don't Start Now; Walker Campbell – Creep	★ Estovan Reizo Cheah – Hero in Me: Melissa Marielle – Easy On Me; Oskar Viniar – Kind Heart
Outstanding Music Single	Outstanding Music Album
★ Estian Reiner Cheah – Magic & Me: First Day Of School – Johnny B. Goode; Walker Campbell – Hot Tamale	★ Kacey Fifield – Between The Lines: Èl Tejas – No End; First Day Of School – Exist
Outstanding Ensemble Cast	Outstanding Dancer
★ Dodger: Billy Jenkins, Aabay Ali, Ellie-May Sheridan, Mila Lieu, Lenny Rush: Santa's Second Wife: Catherine Cain, Jasper Burger, Madison Ross; Son of a Critch: Benjamin Evan Ainsworth, Mark Ezekiel Rivera, Sophia Powers	★ Mia Denae' Brathwaite: B-Boy Lil E; Michael Cash
Outstanding Influencer – Youth Actor	Outstanding Influencer – Youth Actress
★ Estovan Reizo Cheah: Gavin Duh; Ryan Secret	★ Molly Belle Wright: Charlotte Delaney Riggs; Sophie Grace
Outstanding Podcast Host	Outstanding Writer
★ Ari Kelly – At Your Level: Leela Prickitt – At Your Level; Madison Lauren – All Things Madison	★ Maya Jai Pinson – Distractions: Ellery Futch – The Brown Family; Sejal Patel – Life with the Patels 2: Oh Deer!
Outstanding Producer	Outstanding Director
★ Sejal Patel – Hanging by a Thread: Jeffery Wu – Indian Cowboys; Kristen Duff – The Flood That Changed My Home	★ Maya Jai Pinson – Distractions: Brock Brenner – A Letter to My Dad; Sejal Patel – Life with the Patels 2: Oh Deer!
