= Into the Storm (2014 film) =

2014 found footage disaster film by Steven Quale

- Theatrical release poster
- Directed by: Steven Quale
- Written by: John Swetnam
- Produced by: Todd Garner
- Starring: Richard Armitage; Sarah Wayne Callies; Matt Walsh; Alycia Debnam-Carey; Arlen Escarpeta
- Cinematography: Brian Pearson
- Edited by: Eric A. Sears
- Music by: Brian Tyler
- Production companies: New Line Cinema; Broken Road Productions; Village Roadshow Pictures
- Distributed by: Warner Bros. Pictures
- Release date: August 8, 2014 (United States)
- Running time: 89 minutes
- Country: United States
- Language: English
- Budget: $50 million
- Box office: $161.5 million

Into the Storm is a 2014 American found footage disaster film directed by Steven Quale, written by John Swetnam, and starring Richard Armitage, Sarah Wayne Callies, Matt Walsh, Alycia Debnam-Carey, and Arlen Escarpeta. It is a meteorological disaster film about a tornado outbreak striking the fictional town of Silverton, Oklahoma.

The film was released by Warner Bros. Pictures on August 8, 2014. The film grossed $161.5 million against the $50 million budget, and received mixed reviews; while it was praised for its special effects, the film was criticized for its scriptwriting and casting.

== Plot ==
Pete, a veteran storm chaser, attempts to intercept and film tornadoes using Titus, a Tornado Intercept Vehicle, but has come up short all year long. Upon learning of a major line of developing storms, his team of chasers decide to head for the town of Silverton, Oklahoma, in hopes of filming tornadoes. After arriving there, the team discovers that the cell they had been chasing has dissipated. It then abruptly strengthens, resulting in a hailstorm and tornado. As the team films, the funnel shifts course and heads for a high school.

There, the weather sours. The students are marshaled into the school building. In the aftermath of the tornado, shaken students emerge from the damaged building to view the destruction, while vice-principal Gary Fuller sets out to rescue his eldest son Donnie, who went to an abandoned paper mill to help his friend Kaitlyn with a project; both were subsequently trapped when the tornado brought the building down on them.

As Pete's storm chase team stops in a small part of town, a tornado takes shape just as Gary and his younger son and Donnie's brother Trey arrive, destroying several buildings. Before the tornado dissipates, Gary saves Pete's meteorologist, Allison Stone. Pete's team then agree to help Gary get to the paper mill. While en route, another round of tornadoes form and encircle Pete's team, destroying a residential neighborhood and a car lot in the process. An explosion turns a tornado into a firenado, which cameraman Jacob tries to film, only to be caught up in the storm and killed. This causes friction in the team, as Pete's concern seems to be more on collecting data than ensuring his team's safety, until Daryl admits that he pressured Jacob into filming, causing his death. After recovering their vehicles, Allison leaves with Gary to continue their trip to the paper mill.

At the mill, a water pipe breaks and begins to flood the hole in which Donnie and Kaitlyn are trapped. Injured and at risk of drowning, the two record messages for their loved ones, then prepare for the worst. At the last minute, Gary and Allison arrive and free them.

In the skies above Silverton, a convergence of two tornadoes results in a colossal EF-5 tornado that threatens to level the town. Silverton's citizens have taken shelter at the school, but Pete's team determines that the school's storm shelter will be inadequate. Unable to alert the school's staff with mobile devices, Pete's team rushes to the school. While citizens rush to board school buses, Pete and his team follow the storm, but the last school bus and some cars are cut off from the retreat due to a downed transmission tower.

The storm chasers and school refugees take cover in a storm drain at a construction site, but a truck from the airport that the tornado struck damages a storm grate, compromising the shelter. Trying to save lives, Pete hands over his research hard drives to Gary, then sacrifices himself by leaving the shelter to move Titus down to the storm grate, to use the vehicle to anchor the storm grate to the concrete face and has the others tie its towline to the crashed truck for support. Titus's equipment, however, cannot anchor the vehicle to the ground. From the camera turret aboard Titus, Pete observes the tornado's funnel as the vehicle is lifted above the clouds, fulfilling his dream, before crashing to the ground, killing him and wrecking Titus. The EF-5 tornado then dissipates.

In the aftermath of the tornado outbreak, the townspeople begin to clean up and rebuild. Obeying their father, Trey and Donnie record messages from the senior class for a time capsule to be opened in 25 years. Many of those they interview express newfound appreciations for their lives. Allison praises Pete's sacrifice and dedication to science. The last footage shows that two local daredevils Donk and Reevis, who were sucked up by the tornado, have survived the storm.

== Cast ==
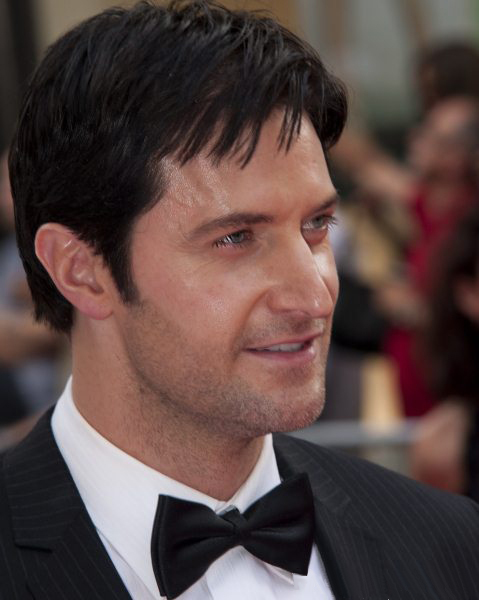
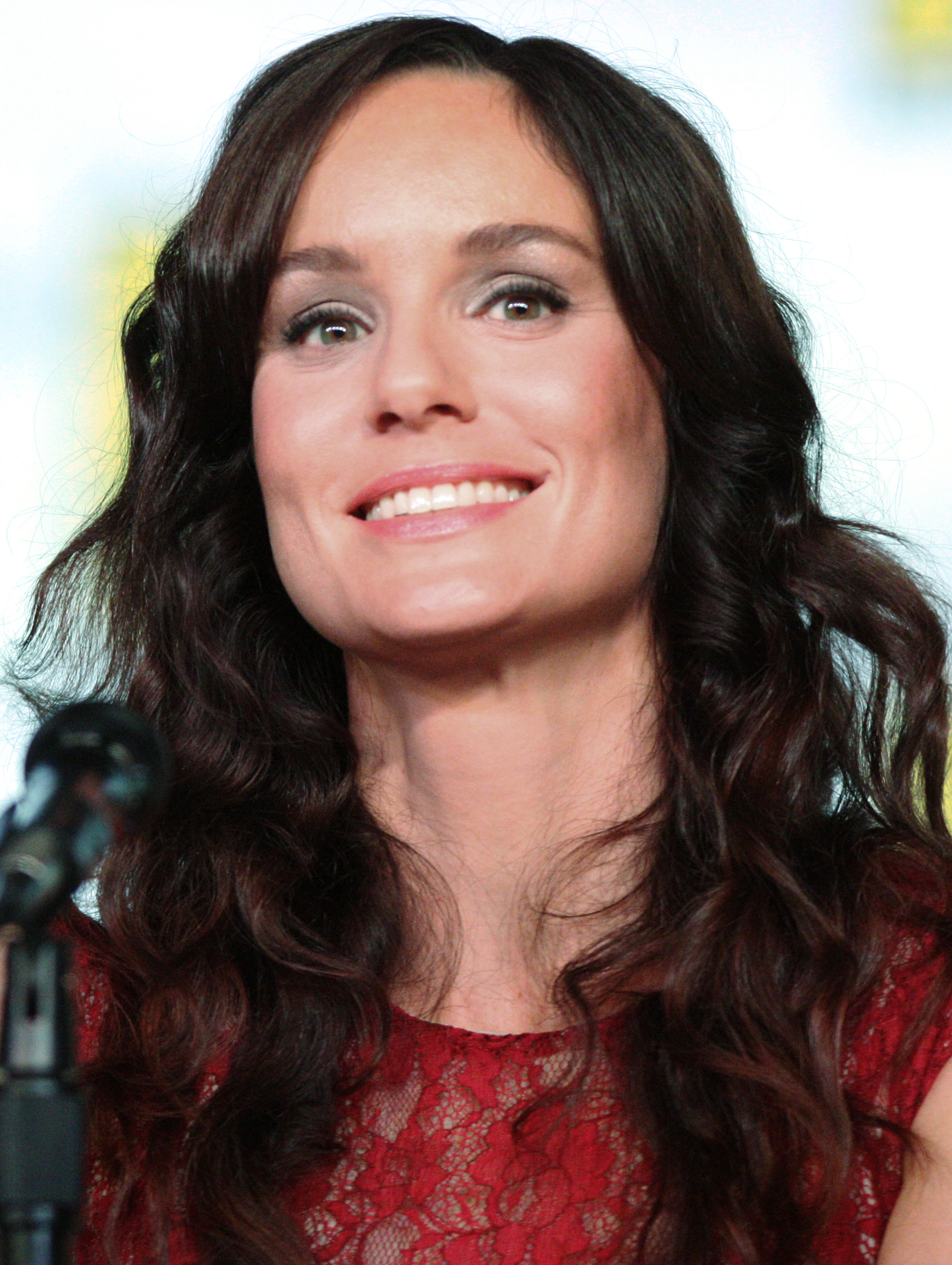
Richard Armitage (left) and Sarah Wayne Callies (right), who play the lead roles in the film
- Richard Armitage as Gary Fuller, the vice principal of Silverton High School
- Sarah Wayne Callies as Allison Stone, the somewhat passionate meteorologist on Pete's team. Her desire to be with her daughter often angers Pete.
- Matt Walsh as Peter "Pete" Moore, the veteran storm chaser and the leader of his team. His attitude changes slightly throughout the film.
- Max Deacon as Donnie Fuller, a junior at Silverton High School, and son of Gary Fuller
- Alycia Debnam-Carey as Kaitlyn Johnston, a junior at Silverton High School and Donnie's love interest
- Nathan Kress as Trey Fuller, a sophomore at Silverton High School, son of Gary Fuller & brother of Donnie
- Arlen Escarpeta as Daryl Karley, a camera operator
- Jeremy Sumpter as Jacob Hodges, a rookie camera operator
- Lee Whittaker as Lucas Guerrette, a camera operator
- Stephanie Koenig as Marcia
- Kyle Davis as Donk, a reckless daredevil
- Jon Reep as Reevis, Donk's friend who records his stunts
- Scott Lawrence as Principal Thomas Walker
- David Drumm as Chester
- Brandon Ruiter as Todd
- Kron Moore as Mrs. Blasky
- Patrick Sarniak as High School Teacher (uncredited)

== Production ==
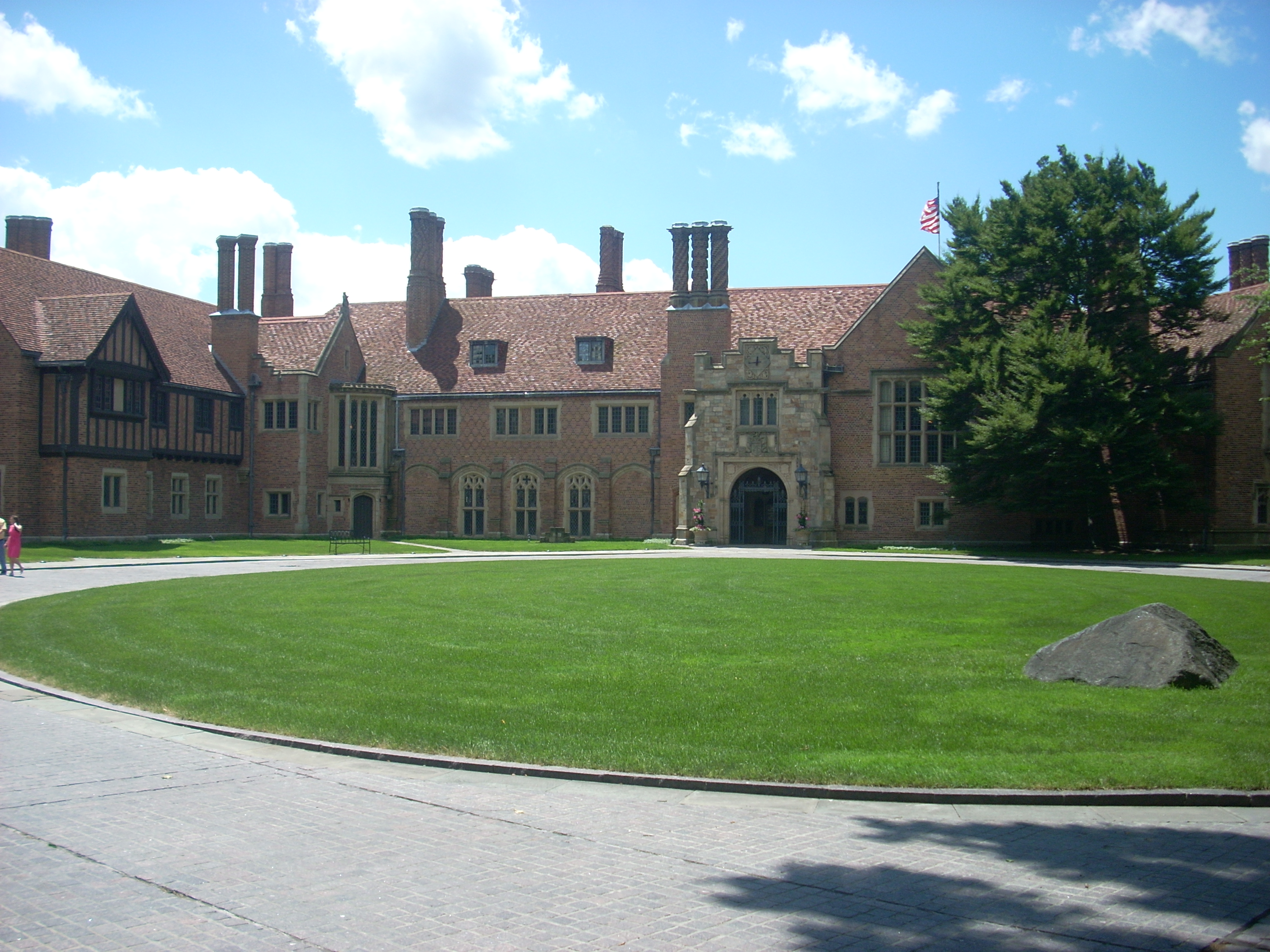
Oakland University's building, where some shots were filmed.

On October 28, 2011, Deadline reported that New Line Cinema bought the "found footage" natural disaster spec script written by John Swetnam, and that Todd Garner would be producing the film through his Broken Road Productions company. Garner came up with the idea for the script. On January 5, 2012, it was announced that director Steve Quale would direct the then-untitled "Found-Footage" Tornado thriller.

On April 24, 2012, Variety reported that New Line had given the green light for their next film project, about an EF6 tornado (although the current EF5 category has no upper limit), and that the film was in development and set to begin shooting on July 9 in Detroit. On August 23, 2012, the untitled "Category Six" Tornado project film got the title Black Sky, and was filming in Detroit. On September 24, 2013, New Line retitled the film to Into the Storm and set the release date to August 8, 2014.

=== Casting ===
An open casting call was held on May 19, 2012, in Pontiac, Michigan. On May 24, Alycia Debnam-Carey signed up to play a female lead. On June 1, New Line added Arlen Escarpeta to the project. On June 22, Sarah Wayne Callies signed up to play Allison Stone. On July 2, New Line cast Nathan Kress, who portrayed a brother finding his sibling. On July 11, 2012, Richard Armitage signed up to portray Gary Fuller, a widowed father who tries to rescue his son from the tornadoes. Shooting was set to begin on July 23 in Detroit. On July 13, Max Deacon joined the film's cast to play Donnie, an introverted teen with a crush on his high school's prettiest girl. Comedian Matt Walsh joined the cast of the film on August 1, 2012, to play the character of Pete.

=== Filming ===
Principal photography began in July 2012 in Detroit. On August 13, 2012, shooting moved to Rochester, Michigan, two weeks after filming wrapped in Detroit. It was also filmed in Oakland Charter Township, Oakview Middle School and Oakland University.

=== Music ===
The film's music was scored by Brian Tyler. The soundtrack of the film was released on August 5, 2014.

=== Visual effects ===
The visual effects are provided by Digital Domain, Moving Picture Company, Cinesite, Method Studios, Prime Focus World, Scanline VFX and The Third Floor, Inc. and Supervised by Jay Barton, Guillaume Rocheron, Simon Stanley-Clamp, Nordin Rahhali, Bruce Woloshyn, Randy Goux, Chad Wiebe, Shawn Hull and Tracy L. Kettler with help from Hydraulx and Rhythm and Hues Studios.

== Release ==
On September 24, 2013, Warner Bros. Pictures set the film to be released on August 8, 2014.

=== Home media ===
The film was released on Digital HD on October 28, 2014, and on DVD and Blu-ray on November 18, 2014, by Warner Home Video.

=== Box office ===
Into the Storm grossed $47.6 million in the US and $113.9 million in other territories for a total of $161.5 million, against a production budget of $50 million.

== Critical response ==
On the review aggregator website Rotten Tomatoes, 21% of 157 critics' reviews are positive. The website's consensus reads: "Clumsily scripted and populated with forgettable characters, Into the Storm has little to offer beyond its admittedly thrilling special effects." Metacritic, which uses a weighted average, assigned the film a score of 44 out of 100, based on 32 critics, indicating "mixed or average" reviews. Audiences polled by CinemaScore gave the film an average grade of "B" on a scale of A+ to F.

Variety's Scott Foundas called the film "(a) feature-length VFX demo reel that makes one pine for the glory days of Jan de Bont". Scott Mendelson of Forbes reviewed the film and commented that the film is visually dazzling and mostly successful in updating the disaster film for the YouTube age. He said, "The special effects work is basically flawless, and you absolutely get what you arguably came to see. You want big-screen images of insanely large-scale tornadoes and big-scale devastation and disaster carnage? Into the Storm gives you plenty of rock-solid disaster porn."
