= Alan Bradley (writer) =

Canadian mystery writer (1938–2026)

- Born: October 10, 1938; Toronto, Ontario, Canada
- Died: May 18, 2026 (aged 87); Isle of Man
- Occupation: Writer
- Writing career
- Period: 1994–2026
- Genre: Mystery
- Notable work: Flavia de Luce mystery series (including The Sweetness at the Bottom of the Pie)

Alan Bradley (October 10, 1938 – May 18, 2026) was a Canadian mystery writer known for his Flavia de Luce series, which began with the acclaimed The Sweetness at the Bottom of the Pie.

== Early life and engineering career ==
Bradley was born on October 10, 1938 in Toronto, Ontario, Canada. He was brought up with two older sisters in the small town of Cobourg. When Bradley was a toddler, his father left the family and his mother raised the children alone. Bradley learned to read at an early age, partly because he was a sickly child who spent a lot of time in bed. However, Bradley confessed to having been a "very bad student", particularly in high school, spending his free time reading in the local cemetery because he felt he didn't fit in.

After completing his education, Bradley worked in Cobourg as a radio and television engineer, designing and building electronic systems. He then worked briefly for Ryerson Polytechnical Institute in Toronto (now Toronto Metropolitan University), before moving to Saskatoon to take a job at the University of Saskatchewan in 1969. There he helped develop a broadcasting studio, where he worked as Director of Television Engineering for 25 years. He took an early retirement from the university in 1994 to become a full-time writer.

== Writing career ==
Bradley wrote several short stories that were read on CBC Radio and published in literary magazines. Following his early retirement from the University of Saskatchewan in 1994, Bradley and his wife Shirley moved to Kelowna, British Columbia, for her work, while Bradley focused on writing. He wrote multiple screenplays over the course of nine years. Then, during the 2003 Okanagan Mountain Park Fire, many homes neighboring Bradley's were destroyed, although his was spared from the fire. The experience inspired him to do something different, and he began focusing on memoirs instead of screenplays. He wrote a non-fiction book called Ms Holmes of Baker Street and a memoir called The Shoebox Bible.

Bradley's wife was listening to CBC Radio as Louise Penny, a Canadian mystery author, discussed the Debut Dagger fiction competition, run by the U.K. Crime Writers' Association and sponsored by the Orion Publishing Group in Britain. The competition requires that entrants submit the first chapter and a synopsis of a murder mystery. Bradley's wife encouraged him to write something new about the "girl on the camp stool", a minor character who had emerged in the novel Bradley was working on. In early 2007, Bradley entered the Dagger contest by submitting fifteen pages about the "girl on the camp stool" character, now named Flavia de Luce. These pages, which took only a few days to write and several weeks of polishing, would become the basis of The Sweetness at the Bottom of the Pie. Bradley set the book in England despite having never visited it. In June 2007, two judges from the contest contacted Bradley's agent in Canada to express interest in publishing the proposed book; they also inadvertently informed him that Bradley was the winner of the competition. A bidding war ensued, and on June 27, 2007, Bradley sold Orion the rights for three books in Britain. Within several days, Doubleday had purchased the Canadian rights and Bantam Books the U.S. rights. At age 69, Bradley left North America for the first time when he went to London to pick up the Dagger award on July 5, 2007.

Upon his return to Canada after the award ceremony, Bradley took a few weeks off, and then spent seven months turning the submitted fifteen pages into a full-length novel. The Sweetness at the Bottom of the Pie was published in the UK in January 2009 and in Canada in February 2009. The book has since developed into a series of novels about young Flavia de Luce solving various crimes in a 1950s village. The second installment (The Weed That Strings the Hangman's Bag) was published in March 2010, the third (A Red Herring without Mustard) in February 2011, the fourth (I Am Half-Sick of Shadows) in December 2011, and the fifth (Speaking from Among the Bones) in January 2013. The sixth book, The Dead in Their Vaulted Arches, was released in early 2014. The series has been extended to ten books, up from an original order of six. Bradley's Thrice the Brinded Cat Hath Mew'd: A Flavia de Luce Novel was published in 2016 with positive reviews.

In May 2023, it was announced that The Sweetness at the Bottom of the Pie would be adapted as a feature film entitled Flavia, with Molly Belle Wright starring as Flavia.

== Personal life and death ==
After selling their home in Kelowna, British Columbia, in 2009, Bradley and his wife Shirley spent time travelling, hoping to spend time living in various places and visiting every country that published his books.

Bradley died on the Isle of Man on May 18, 2026, at the age of 87.

== Bibliography ==
=== Standalone ===
- Ms. Holmes of Baker Street (as C. Alan Bradley, with William A. S. Sarjeant) (2004) ISBN 9780888644152
- The Shoebox Bible (2006) ISBN 9780771016639

=== Flavia de Luce series ===
- The Sweetness at the Bottom of the Pie (2009) (Flavia de Luce #1) ISBN 9780385665834
- The Weed That Strings the Hangman's Bag (2010) (Flavia de Luce #2) ISBN 9780385665858
- A Red Herring Without Mustard (2011) (Flavia de Luce #3) ISBN 9780385665872
- I Am Half-Sick of Shadows (2011) (Flavia de Luce #4) ISBN 9780385668118
- Speaking from Among the Bones (2013) (Flavia de Luce #5) ISBN 9780385668149
- The Dead in Their Vaulted Arches (2014) (Flavia de Luce #6) ISBN 9780385668156
- The Curious Case of the Copper Corpse (Flavia de Luce #6.5 An ebook Short Story) (2014)
- As Chimney Sweepers Come to Dust (2015) (Flavia de Luce #7) ISBN 9780345539939
- Thrice the Brinded Cat Hath Mew'd (Flavia de Luce #8) (2016) ISBN 9780345539960
- The Grave's a Fine and Private Place (2018) (Flavia de Luce #9) ISBN 9780345539991
- The Golden Tresses of the Dead (2019) (Flavia de Luce #10) ISBN 978-0385678476
- What Time the Sexton's Spade Doth Rust (2024) (Flavia de Luce #11) ISBN 9780593724514
- Numb Were the Beadsman's Fingers (2026) (Flavia de Luce #12) ISBN 9780593724545
