= Mubi =

Mubi may refer to:

- Mubi (streaming service), a film streaming platform
- Mubi (town), a town in Nigeria
  - Mubi North, a local government area
  - Mubi South, a local government area
- Mubi language, a language of Chad
  - Mubi languages, a group of languages

== See also ==
- MUBY
- MUBE
