= Steven Quale =

American film director

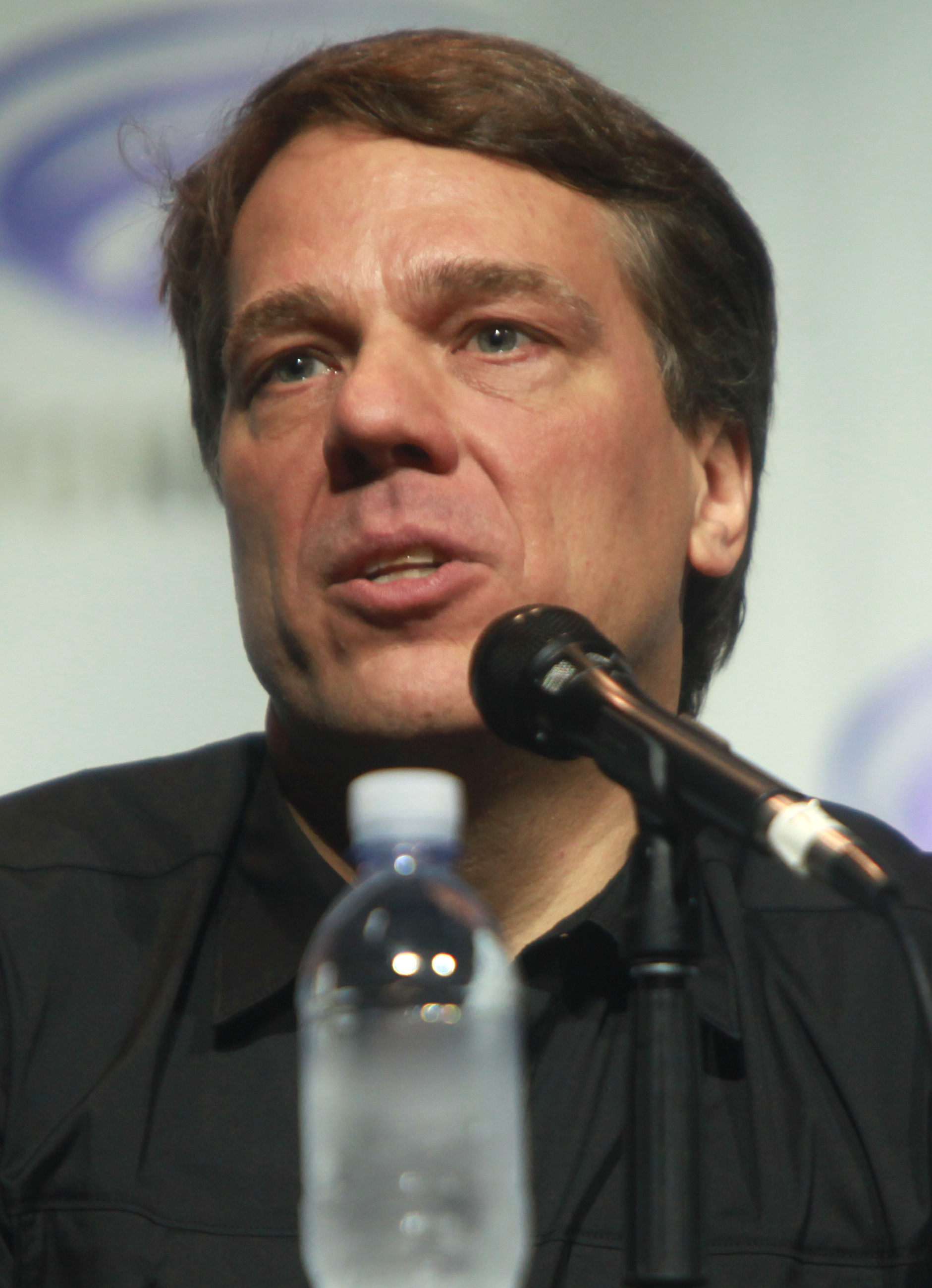
- Quale speaking at the 2014 WonderCon
- Occupations: Film director, second unit director
- Notable work: Final Destination 5 Into the Storm

Steven Quale is an American film director, known for Final Destination 5 and Into the Storm, as well as his earlier work as a second unit director for James Cameron on Titanic (1997) and Avatar (2009).

== Filmography ==
Director

- Darkness (1988)
- Superfire (2002)
- Aliens of the Deep (2005)
- Final Destination 5 (2011)
- Into the Storm (2014)
- Renegades (2017)
- Black Box (2026)
- Alphas (TBA)

2nd unit director

Year	Title	Director
1997	Titanic	James Cameron
2000	The Adventures of Rocky and Bullwinkle	Des McAnuff
2003	The Haunted Mansion	Rob Minkoff
2009	Avatar	James Cameron
2020	Greyhound	Aaron Schneider

Acting credits

Year	Title	Role
1997	Titanic	Unnamed engineer who gets electrocuted
2001	Pearl Harbor	Evelyn's ex-secretary
2002	Secretary	Duncan
2008	The Incredible Hulk	Unnamed citizen
