= The Sweetness at the Bottom of the Pie =

2009 mystery by Alan Bradley

Sweetness at the Bottom of the pie
- Front cover of US/Canada first edition
- Author: Alan Bradley
- Cover artist: Joe Montgomery (US)
- Language: English
- Series: Flavia de Luce Mysteries
- Genre: Mystery
- Publisher: Orion (UK); Delacorte Press (US)
- Publication date: 22 January 2009 (UK); 10 February 2009 (Canada); 28 April 2009 (US)
- Publication place: Canada
- Media type: Print (Hardcover & Paperback); Audiobook; E-book
- Pages: 304 (UK first edition); 384 (US first edition)
- ISBN: 978-0-385-34230-8 (US); ISBN 978-0-385-66582-7 (Canada); ISBN 978-0-7528-9194-1 (UK); ISBN 978-1-4104-1917-0 (large print)
- OCLC: 256534817

The Sweetness at the Bottom of the Pie is a 2009 mystery by Alan Bradley. Set in the English countryside in 1950, it features Flavia de Luce, an 11-year-old amateur sleuth who pulls herself away from her beloved chemistry lab in order to clear her father in a murder investigation. Bradley, a first-time novelist, wrote the book after winning the 2007 Debut Dagger Award and selling the publishing rights in three countries, based on the first chapter and a synopsis. Well-received by critics, the novel won multiple awards and is the first in an 11-book series.

== Plot ==
As the novel opens, Flavia Sabina de Luce schemes revenge against her two older sisters, Ophelia (17) and Daphne (13), who have locked her inside a closet in Buckshaw, the family's country manor home located in the English village of Bishop's Lacey. Flavia has braces and pigtails like a typical 11-year-old girl, but she is also a brilliant amateur chemist with a speciality in poisons and a fully equipped, personal laboratory on the top floor of her home. With her scientific notebook at the ready, she steals her oldest sister's lipstick, adds poison ivy extract, and then waits, eagerly anticipating changes in Ophelia's complexion. Flavia is especially jealous of her oldest sister because, at 17, she is the only one of the three girls with memories of their mother, Harriet, a free spirit who disappeared on a mountaineering adventure in Tibet 10 years earlier and is presumed dead. Harriet's disappearance devastated their father, Colonel Haviland "Jacko" de Luce, a philatelist and former amateur illusionist who spends most of his time poring over his stamp collection. The family shares their home with loyal retainer Arthur Wellesley Dogger, who once saved Colonel de Luce's life during the war and now works as Buckshaw's gardener, suffering frequent bouts of memory loss and hallucinations due to posttraumatic stress disorder from his time as a prisoner of war.

Mysterious events begin to occur when Mrs. Mullet, Buckshaw's housekeeper and cook, discovers a dead jack snipe on the porch with a Penny Black stamp pierced through its beak. Then, Flavia and Dogger overhear a heated argument between Colonel de Luce and a red-headed stranger who shortly turns up dead in the family cucumber patch. When Colonel de Luce is arrested for the crime, Flavia takes to her bicycle, Gladys, and begins an investigation in the village of Bishop's Lacey, interviewing suspects, gathering clues, and compiling research at the library, always staying ahead of Inspector Hewitt and the police department. As she single-handedly solves the crime, she uncovers the truth behind a 30-year-old apparent suicide at Colonel de Luce's alma mater, Greyminster. The suicide victim, housemaster and Latin scholar Grenville Twining, and the red-headed stranger in the cucumber patch, Horace "Bony" Bonepenny, both uttered "Vale" as a last word. The trail connecting their deaths also includes political intrigue, rare Ulster Avenger stamps, sleight of hand, theft, blackmail, and murder.

== Major theme ==
Bradley describes the theme as "youthful idealism" and how far it can take someone "if it's not stamped out, as it so often is." Thinking back to his own childhood, he identifies with Flavia's 11-year-old zeal, remembering the "feeling of being absolutely unstoppable," capable of anything. He explains, "when you're that age, you sometimes have a great burning enthusiasm that is very deep and very narrow, and that is something that has always intrigued me - that world of the 11-year-old that is so quickly lost." Reviewer Francisca Goldsmith notes this theme as well, suggesting that readers "may come away with a slightly altered view of what is possible for a headstrong girl to achieve."

== Style ==
The writing style in The Sweetness at the Bottom of the Pie has been described as reminiscent of the "Golden Age of crime writing," influenced by the author's appreciation for the work of W. J. Burley, G. K. Chesterton, Agatha Christie, Arthur Conan Doyle, Ngaio Marsh, Dorothy L. Sayers, and Josephine Tey. Reviewer Lucy Clark compared Bradley's style to that of Agatha Christie, calling The Sweetness at the Bottom of the Pie a "delightfully old-fashioned mystery." Kirkus Reviews compared the book's "intellectual asides" to that of Jonathan Gash.

== Development history ==
In the spring of 2006, Bradley had been working on a different book set in the 1950s, when the plot developed to include a detective character arriving at a country house to find a little girl in the driveway, sitting "on a camp stool doing something with a notebook and a pencil." That little girl was Flavia. Bradley explains "she walked onto the page of another book I was writing, and simply hijacked the story." "I can't take any credit for Flavia at all," he says. "She just materialized."

When Bradley's wife heard author Louise Penny, a 2004 Debut Dagger award runner-up, on the radio talking about the British crime-writing competition, she encouraged her husband to enter. She advised him to abandon the original book he had been writing and "send the stuff about the girl on the camp stool," instead. The competition, which is open to anyone who has not yet published a novel commercially, requires would-be novelists to submit the first 3,000 words (or less), along with a 500-1,000 word synopsis. Writing the draft of the first chapter "took Bradley just a couple of days, but he then spent weeks polishing it, only just sneaking the first pages of The Sweetness at the Bottom of the Pie in under the final deadline."

He won the 2007 Debut Dagger "based on a chapter and a synopsis," and "signed a three-book deal with Orion for a crime series centering on 11-year-old sleuth Flavia de Luce." Through agent Denise Bukowski, he also auctioned U.S. rights to Bantam Books and Canadian rights to Doubleday Canada, securing three separate three-book deals for a proposed six-book series, based on a 17-page submission. Calling the submission fresh and original, Kristin Cochrane of Doubleday Canada admitted: "we've rarely, if ever bought fiction on so little material." Orion's Bill Massey agreed, remarking that "it was just a chapter, but it was so outstanding that it made me realise he is a real talent, and that he had an idea that could be a really terrific series." Massey further explained that "Flavia just seemed so alive on the page, and her voice was so distinctive and engaging." After Bradley picked up the Dagger award in London on his first trip to England, the Canadian author took a few weeks off and then "sat down and wrote Sweetness in seven months flat."

== Reception ==
Critics almost universally praised the novel upon its publication, primarily citing the compelling character portrayal of 11-year-old lead detective, Flavia de Luce. Reviewers have called Flavia brilliant, bold, irresistible, incorrigible, precocious, adorable, and unique. For Canadian Literature, Beverly Haun wrote "Flavia is a gem of a character; her precocity offset by her emotional vulnerability makes a winning combination." Marilyn Stasio for The New York Times Book Review agreed, proclaiming Flavia "impressive as a sleuth and enchanting as a mad scientist," but "most endearing as a little girl who has learned how to amuse herself in a big lonely house." Reviewer Paula Todd for The Globe and Mail (Canada), however, was not impressed. Calling Flavia "too much of a caricature to appeal to the subtlety-seeking adult mystery reader," she declared the language "often tedious" and the references "too obscure" for younger readers. Todd wrote "the burning question a few chapters in is not whodunit, but who wants to read it? To whom, exactly, is this book meant to appeal?" Other reviewers have noted strong appeal to a wide range of readers. Michele Leber for Library Journal noted "appeal for cozy lovers and well beyond" while Francisca Goldsmith for School Library Journal suggested "mystery fans, Anglophiles, and science buffs will delight" in The Sweetness at the Bottom of the Pie. Judy Coon for Booklist insisted "only those who dislike precocious young heroines with extraordinary vocabulary and audacious courage can fail to like this amazingly entertaining book."

== Film adaptation ==
In May 2023, it was announced that Molly Belle Wright, Martin Freeman and Toby Jones will be starring in a film adaptation of The Sweetness at the Bottom of the Pie. Susan Coyne is set to adapt the story, while Bharat Nalluri will be director.

Flavia was released in April in the UK, and is set to be released on December 4, 2026 in the United States.

== Awards and nominations ==
Award	Year	Result
Agatha Award, Best First Novel	2009	Winner
Alex Award	2010	Nominated
Amelia Bloomer List, Young Adult Fiction	2010	Among 18 winners
Anthony Award, Best First Novel	2010	Nominated
Arthur Ellis Awards, Best First Novel	2010	Winner
Barry Award, Best First Novel	2010	Winner
Debut Dagger Award	2007	Winner
Dilys Award	2010	Winner
Macavity Awards, Best First Mystery Novel	2010	Winner
Spotted Owl Award	2010	Winner
YALSA Best Books for Young Adults	2010	Among 90 winners
YRCA, Senior Division	2012	Nominated
