= Flavia (film) =

Family adventure film

- Canadian theatrical release poster
- Directed by: Bharat Nalluri
- Screenplay by: Susan Coyne
- Based on: Flavia de Luce by Alan Bradley
- Produced by: Paula Mazur; Mitchell Kaplan; Robert Mickelson
- Starring: Molly Belle Wright; Martin Freeman; Jonathan Pryce; Toby Jones
- Cinematography: Tim Maurice Jones
- Edited by: Jamie Pearson
- Music by: Mychael Danna; Jeff Danna
- Production companies: The Mazur Kaplan Company; Mystic Point Productions; Zephyr Films; Pigasus Pictures; Sky Original Films
- Distributed by: Sky Cinema (United Kingdom); Magenta Light Studios (United States)
- Release dates: April 4, 2026 (United Kingdom); December 4, 2026 (United States)
- Running time: 96 minutes
- Countries: United Kingdom; United States
- Language: English

Flavia (titled Flavia: Girl Detective in North America) is a 2026 family adventure film directed by Bharat Nalluri and starring Molly Belle Wright, Martin Freeman, Jonathan Pryce, and Toby Jones. It is adapted from the first book in the Alan Bradley Flavia de Luce book series, The Sweetness at the Bottom of the Pie.

== Cast ==
- Molly Belle Wright as Flavia De Luce
- Martin Freeman as Havilland De Luce
  - Zach Colton as Young Havilland
- Tallulah Conabeare as Daphne De Luce
- Ariella Glaser as Ophelia De Luce
- Toby Jones as Inspector Hewitt
- Karan Gill as Dogger
- Annette Badland as Mrs. Mullet
- Jonathan Pryce as Dr. Kissing
- Jamie Beamish as Horace Bonepenny
  - Liam Carrington as Young Bonepenny
- Hannah New as Harriet De Luce
- Nicholas Burns as Frank Pemberton
  - Arthur Heath as Young Pemberton
- Lawrence Russell as Mr. Teesdale
- Orlando Norman as Sgt. Graves

== Production ==
=== Development ===
The film is based on the character from the Alan Bradley series of books concerning the child detective Flavia de Luce. An option for the book series was initially obtained by Sam Mendes in 2012.

The film was based on the screenplay by Susan Coyne and is directed by Bharat Nalluri. The film is being produced by Paula Mazur and Mitchell Kaplan for The Mazur Kaplan Company and Robert Mickelson for Mystic Point, with Protagonist Pictures handling international sales.

=== Music ===
Mychael Danna and Jeff Danna were hired to compose the score.

=== Casting ===
Molly Belle Wright plays the title role. Ariella Glaser and Tallulah Conabeare play Flavia's sisters, Ophelia and Daphne de Luce. Martin Freeman, Jonathan Pryce, Meera Syal, and Toby Jones joined the cast in May 2023.

=== Filming ===
Principal photography took place in the United Kingdom in October 2024. Filming locations include Reading, Berkshire and Guildford. Filming was scheduled to last 8 weeks to the end of November 2024.

== Release ==
The film was released in the U.K. on Sky Cinema on April 4, 2026.

In June 2026, Magenta Light Studios acquired distribution rights to the film for the United States, France, Germany, Italy, Scandinavia, the Netherlands, Switzerland, and China, scheduling it for a theatrical release in the United States on December 4, 2026.
