= Christmas pageant =

Public event celebrating Christmas

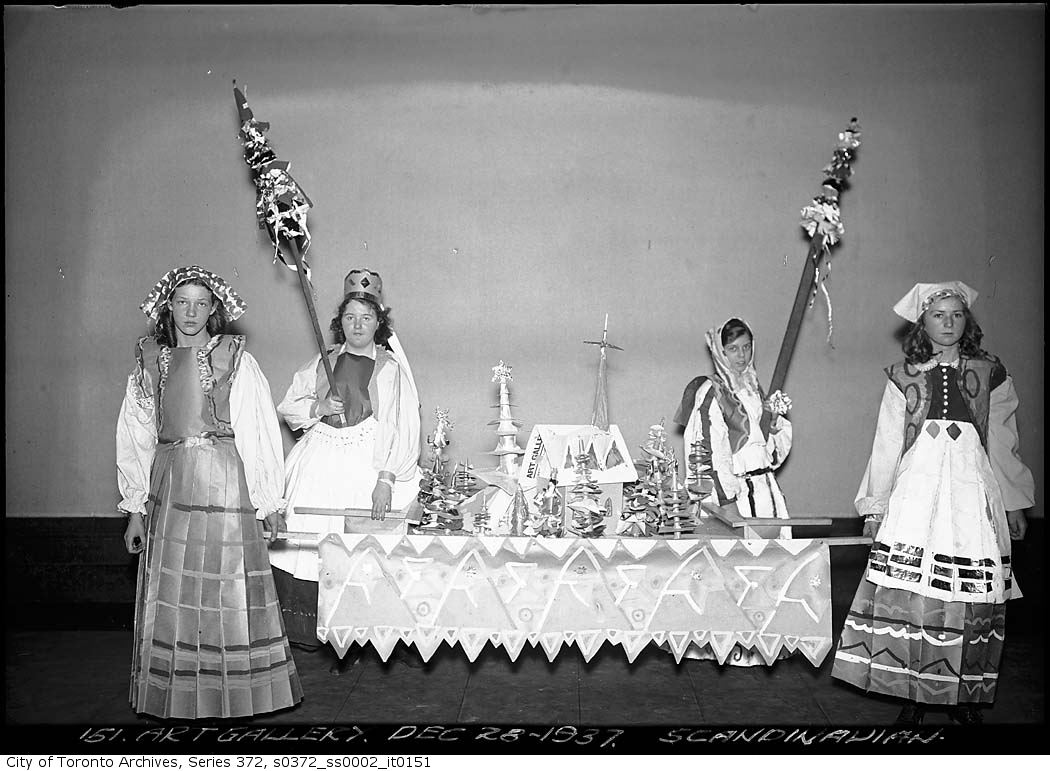
- 1937 Christmas pageant
- Type: Christian
- Date: December
- Frequency: Annual

A Christmas pageant is a public event conducted in celebration of the Christmas holiday, typically involving an entertainment in the form of a procession (such as a Santa Claus parade), or a Nativity play or other performance.

== Nativity pageant roles ==
Typical roles include:

- Joseph (father of Jesus)
- Mary, mother of Jesus
- Christ Child
- Three Wise Men

- Balthazar
- Caspar
- Melchior

- Caesar Augustus
- Roman soldier
- Herod the Great
- Shepherds
- Donkey
- Calves
- Sheep
- Heralding Angels
- Angels

== Christmas parades ==
The Santa Claus Parade may also be known as the Thanksgiving Day Parade which is held on Thanksgiving yearly. This parade usually includes floats, marching bands, performances of various artists and of course, Santa Claus himself.

== See also ==
- Adelaide Christmas Pageant
- List of holiday parades
