= Barbara Robinson (author) =

American writer

- Born: Barbara Jean Webb; October 24, 1927; Portsmouth, Ohio, U.S.
- Died: July 9, 2013 (aged 85); Berwyn, Pennsylvania, U.S.
- Education: Allegheny College
- Occupation: Author
- Spouse: John F. Robinson
- Children: 2
- Relatives: Theodore L. Webb (father), Grace Webb (mother)
- Writing career
- Notable work: The Best Christmas Pageant Ever (1972)

Barbara Jean Robinson (October 24, 1927 – July 9, 2013) was an American author and writer of the children's books The Best Christmas Pageant Ever (1972) and The Best School Year Ever (1994).

== Biography ==
Barbara Robinson was born and raised in Portsmouth, Ohio, the only child of Theodore L. Webb and his wife Grace Webb (née Mooney). Her father died when she was three. Robinson's mother, a schoolteacher in Portsmouth for forty-nine years, got her interested in books, and she began writing very early. Robinson attended Allegheny College, where she received a bachelor's degree in theater.

In addition to her children's books, Robinson wrote many short stories in publications such as McCall's, Redbook and Ladies Home Journal, and has some books of poetry.

Robinson lived in Berwyn, Pennsylvania, a suburb of Philadelphia. She died July 9, 2013, at her home in Berwyn. She was 85 and had cancer. Robinson had two daughters with her husband John F. Robinson: Carolyn and Marjorie; three grandchildren: Tomas, Marcos, and Lucas.

== Works ==
- Across from Indian Shore, illustrated by Evaline Ness (Lothrop, Lee & Shepard, 1962)
- Trace through the Forest (Lothrop, 1965)
- The Fattest Bear in the First Grade, illus. Cyndy Szekeres (Random House, 1969) – picture book
- Temporary Times, Temporary Places (Harper & Row, 1982)
- My Brother Louis Measures Worms and other Louis stories (Harper, 1988)

The Herdmans

- The Best Christmas Pageant Ever, illus. Judith Gwyn Brown (Harper, 1972); global title The Worst Kids in the World
- The Best School Year Ever (Harper, 1994)
- The Best Halloween Ever (HarperCollins Joanna Cotler Books, 2004)
