= Jamie Adams (director) =

Welsh filmmaker (born 1980)

- Born: Jamie Daniel Adams; 30 May 1980 (age 46); Weymouth, England
- Education: Royal Holloway, University of London; International Film School Wales
- Years active: 2005–present
- Children: 3

Jamie Daniel Adams (born 30 May 1980) is a Welsh filmmaker.

== Early life ==
Adams was born in Weymouth, Dorset and grew up in Porthcawl. He graduated with a Bachelor of Arts in Media Arts from Royal Holloway, University of London in 2001, under the tutorship of Gideon Koppel and a Master of Arts in Film from Newport's International Film School Wales in 2004 where he collaborated with Peter Greenaway and Ken Russell. His mother died while he was at university.

== Career ==
He began his career working as an assistant editor for BBC Television. He also worked as a second unit director on BBC Series Industry.

His first feature film was the 2014 film Benny & Jolene starring Charlotte Ritchie, Craig Roberts and Rosamund Hanson with the pitch that they would be "in a motor-home travelling into North Wales to a music festival and we’d improv all the way there and back". The film was shot in five days for £15,000. Benny & Jolene premiered as the Headline Feature film at the 2014 Loco Comedy Film Festival and was picked up for distribution by Verve Pictures.

His sophomore picture was A Wonderful Christmas Time, a five-day improvisational shoot starring Laura Haddock.

His 2015 Black Mountain Poets was an improvised film about sibling rivalries and family traditions and shot in five days on location in the Welsh Black Mountains and starred Dolly Wells and Alice Lowe. Black Mountain Poets premiered at the Edinburgh International Film Festival in June 2015, it won the Critics Jury Award. It premiered in North America at the 2016 SxSW Film & Music Festival in the Visions Section. The film was British Independent Film Awards nominated in December 2016 and picked up by BFI iplayer after a limited theatrical & released via Metrodome Distribution. Black Mountain Poets went on to make its television debut on FILM4.

Songbird (2018) was shot in January 2017 starring How I Met Your Mother star Cobie Smulders and regular collaborator Richard Elis in collaboration with Falmouth University Film School. In the June of the same year, Girls co-lead Jemima Kirke travelled to Adams' hometown of Porthcawl to film the relationship comedy Wild Honey Pie! with Brett Goldstein and the return of regulars Alice Lowe and Richard Elis.

Wild Honey Pie! (2018) premiered at SXSW 2019 in the Visions Section and was nominated for the Adam Yauch Hornblower Award. The film had a limited theatrical release, before making its television premiere on Film4 as part of their "New British Cinema" season in 2020.

He released three films, Songbird (2018), Balance, Not Symmetry and Bittersweet Symphony (both 2019), over an eight week period. Songbird premiered at the Edinburgh International Film Festival June 28; it was picked up by Sparky Pictures and made its broadcast debut on Sky Cinema.

Balance, Not Symmetry is an audio-visual collaboration between Adams and Global Rock Royalty Biffy Clyro. The project dealt with loss and loneliness, and formed a motion picture and a record. The film premiered as the "People's Gala Premiere" at Royal Festival Hall, Glasgow as part of the 2019 EIFF. The record would go on to become a fans favourite and lead James McMahon of the NME to claim that Balance, Not Symmetry was "easily the most innovative collection of songs the Scottish band have delivered in a good half decade", claiming that it "takes the band in some fascinating, previously unexplored directions" and "reinvigorates one of Britain's most special of bands".

Adams' directed the music video to the title track, "Balance, Not Symmetry", which has reached a million views on YouTube.

During this period, Jamie Adams also produced feature films for Black Mountain Poets alumni Dolly Wells, Tom Cullen and Alice Lowe, including Pink Wall (2019), which premiered at the 2019 SXSW Film and Music Festival in Austin, Texas and would go on to be BAFTA Cymru nominated for Best Feature Film in October 2019. The film starred Tatiana Maslany and Jay Duplass in the co-lead roles.

His 2021 film Love Spreads starred Alia Shawkat and featured a struggling rock band under pressure to record an album at Rockfield Studios in Monmouthshire. Love Spreads premiered at Tribeca Film Festival in 2021, after being officially selected for the pandemic hit edition of Tribeca Film Festival in 2020.

Up next was BFI London Film Festival Official Selection She is Love (2022) starred Haley Bennett, Sam Riley and Marisa Abela and was shot over a week in Cornwall at the height of the Coronavirus pandemic.

In 2024, filming took place on his film Lets Love with a cast including Martin Freeman. In January 2025, he shot Mistletoe & Wine, with a cast including Jason Isaacs and Charlotte Kirk.

=== Film making process ===
He has said he finds the use of storyboards "too rigid and too restricting". His films use a process which is highly improvisational with no script in the traditional sense, often on a low budget and filmed over a very short period of time. He has described not with a script or treatment but with “a scriptment”. The "scriptment" process he has described as giving the actors a story outline, and "if they're interested, we have a few conversations. If they decide to be a part of the process, we take those conversations further. I then go away and write what we call a scene by scene 'scriptment', a screenplay without dialogue...". Then, once filming starts he's happy for actors to improvise because everyone is aware "where we're headed, we know what the arc of the story is, and as long as we're being truthful to the characters then I'm happy."

== Personal life ==
Adams lives in Porthcawl with his wife Zoe and their three children.

== Filmography ==
Film
Year	Title	Director	Writer	Producer	Notes
2011	Back of the Net!	Yes	Yes	Yes	
2014	Benny & Jolene	Yes	Yes	Yes	
2014	A Wonderful Christmas Time	Yes	Yes	Co-producer	
2015	Black Mountain Poets	Yes	Yes	Co-producer	
2018	Wild Honey Pie!	Yes	Yes	Yes	
2018	Songbird	Yes	Yes	No	Alternative title: Alright Now
2018	The Fight	No	No	Executive	
2019	Pink Wall	No	No	Yes	
2019	Good Posture	No	No	Yes	
2019	Balance, Not Symmetry	Yes	Yes	Yes	
2019	Bittersweet Symphony	Yes	Yes	Yes	
2019	The Return of the Yuletide Kid	No	No	Yes	
2021	Love Spreads	Yes	Yes	Yes	
2022	Venice at Dawn	Yes	Yes	No	
2022	She Is Love	Yes	Yes	No	
2025	Pose	Yes	Yes	No	
2026	Only What We Carry	Yes	Yes	No	
2026	Let's Love	Yes	Yes	No	
2026	Christmas & Chaos †	Yes	Yes	No	Post-production
TBA	Real Love (Yes, It's Real Love!) †	Yes	Yes	No	Completed
TBA	Tangled Up in Blue †	Yes	Yes	No	Post-production

Television
Year	Title	Director	Writer	Producer	Notes
2010	All Shook Up!	Yes	Yes	Yes	
2011	Made in Wales	Yes	No	No	Episode: "Monster"
2016	BBC Comedy Feeds	Yes	No	No	Episode: "A Brief History of Tim"
2020	Industry	2UD	No	No	2 episodes
