= Pip Broughton =

English director

- Occupations: Life Coach Creative Coach Leadership Coach Film/tv director, producer, screenwriter, Theatre director, Mentor

Pip Broughton - Life Coach, Creative Coach, Leadership Coach, Award-Winning TV, Film Director, Producer, Writer and Theatre Director.

== Career ==
Broughton began her career working in theatre, holding Artistic Directorships of Croydon Warehouse, Paines Plough and Nottingham Playhouse. Since 1995, Broughton has been working in film and television. She has directed several films for Channel 4 and primetime drama series for both ITV and BBC, including: Blood on the Dole, The Bill, Close and True, and 55 Degrees North.

Broughton moved into producing in 2009. She worked with several new filmmakers as part of Sky Arts' Playhouse Presents series. These include: Idris Elba, Matt Smith and Polly Stenham; and writers Frank McGuinness, Eve Ensler, Mark Ravenhill, Jeremy Brock, Paul O’Grady, Rebecca Lenkiewicz and Sandi Toksvig.

In 2014, Broughton directed an adaptation of Under Milk Wood for the BBC, starring Michael Sheen, Tom Jones, and Jonathan Pryce. The same year, Broughton founded Vox Pictures with producer Adrian Bate. Its first production, Craig Roberts' directorial debut Just Jim, was released in 2015 and premiered at the SXSW Festival.

In 2016, Broughton directed Aberfan: The Green Hollow, a film poem released to commemorate the 50th anniversary of the Aberfan disaster. The film, which starred Michael Sheen, Jonathan Pryce, Siân Phillips, Iwan Rehon, Eve Myles, Aimee-Ffion Edwards and Kimberley Nixon, received the highest BBC audience approval rating in five years, it won three BAFTA Cymru Awards out of seven nominations, was nominated for a BAFTA TV Best Single Drama Award, and received special commendation at the Grierson Awards.

In 2017, Broughton produced and directed Keeping Faith / Un Bore Mercher through her company Vox Pictures. The series, starring Eve Myles and released on S4C and BBC Wales, became the best-performing non-network series for twenty years and the most successful non-network programme on BBC iPlayer of all time. A second and third series were commissioned and by May 2021 had had over 50 million views on BBC iPlayer.

In 2018, Vox Pictures released To Provide All People, a film poem written by Owen Sheers to commemorate the 70th anniversary of the founding of the National Health Service. The programme started Michael Sheen, Eve Myles, Martin Freeman, Jonathan Pryce, Sian Phillips, George MacKay, Michelle Fairley and Tamsin Greig and was directed by Broughton.

In April 2020, in the middle of the COVID-19 pandemic, Broughton wrote and directed the UK's first lockdown series, Cyswllt, an intimate drama providing a snapshot of life during a pandemic, showing the effect of lockdown on individuals and families. The drama was shot entirely remotely via Zoom with actors filming themselves via mobile phones and laptops.

In January 2021, S4C broadcast their first half-hour drama, Fflam, produced by Vox Pictures with two episodes written by Broughton and starring Richard Harrington, Gwyneth Keyworth and Memet Ali Alabora. In July 2021, post-production began on Vox Pictures' new thriller for BBC One, The Trick, starring Jason Watkins, Victoria Hamilton, George MacKay and Jerome Flynn, inspired by the real-life events surrounding the 2009 Climategate email hack at the University of East Anglia.

== Vox Pictures ==
Together with producer Adrian Bate, Broughton runs Vox Pictures. Its productions include: Craig Roberts' directorial debut, Just Jim; Aberfan: The Green Hollow; Keeping Faith, To Provide All People, Cyswllt and Fflam. Eternal Beauty, written and directed by Craig Roberts and produced through Vox's sister company, Cliff Edge Pictures was released in 2020. Upcoming projects on Vox Pictures' slate are the BBC1 thriller The Trick and Maxine Peake's directorial debut, Caravan.
