= She Is Love (film) =

2022 film by Jamie Adams

- Theatrical release poster
- Directed by: Jamie Adams
- Written by: Jamie Adams
- Produced by: Sarah Gabriel; Marc Goldberg; Christian Mercuri
- Starring: Haley Bennett; Sam Riley; Marisa Abela; Rosa Robson; Marika Hackman; Craig Russell
- Cinematography: Jan Vrhovnik
- Edited by: Martina Zamolo; Amy Pettipher
- Music by: Chris Hyson
- Production companies: Signature Films; Capstone Pictures
- Distributed by: Signature Entertainment
- Release dates: 14 October 2022 (London); 3 February 2023 (United Kingdom)
- Running time: 82 minutes
- Country: United Kingdom
- Language: English

She Is Love is a 2022 British romantic drama written and directed by Jamie Adams, starring Haley Bennett, Sam Riley and Marisa Abela.

She Is Love had its world premiere at the BFI London Film Festival on 14 October 2022, and was released in the United Kingdom on 3 February 2023 by Signature Entertainment.

== Synopsis ==
Estranged for more than a decade, a divorced couple Idris (Riley) and Patricia (Bennett) revisit their past whilst stuck together in a Cornish hotel owned by Idris’ current girlfriend Louise (Abela).

== Cast ==
- Haley Bennett as Patricia
- Sam Riley as Idris
- Marisa Abela as Louise
- Craig Russell as Frank
- Rosa Robson as Kate

== Production ==
Principal photography finished in Cornwall in April 2021, with some filming taking place at Tresillian House, St Newlyn East. The film has been said to have been shot in six days during lockdown and to have been made in an improvisational style that Adams also deployed on previous pictures, such as Black Mountain Poets and Love Spreads.

== Release ==
The film received its world premiere at the 66th BFI London Film Festival on 14 October 2022. It was released theatrically and on digital platforms in the United Kingdom on 3 February 2023 by Signature Entertainment.

== Reception ==
On review aggregator Rotten Tomatoes, 31% of 29 critics gave the film a positive review; the website's critical consensus reads: "Roses are red, violets are blue, the ill-fated She Is Love eschews conventions but barely grants a good performance of two". On Metacritic, the film has a weighted average score of 37 out of 100 based on 5 critics, which the site labels as "generally unfavorable" reviews.

Kevin Maher of The Times described it as a “charming screwball chemistry” between the main actors with “a knock-out” performance from Marisa Abela, adding also that it was “nicely shot”. Laura Venning in Empire described it as “pleasant". Writing for RogerEbert.com, Christy Lemire gave the film a negative review, calling it a "dreary romantic drama" that's "dreadfully boring".
