= Songbird (2018 film) =

2018 comedy film

Alright Now
- UK Film Poster
- Directed by: Jamie Adams
- Written by: Jamie Adams
- Produced by: Maggie Monteith; Jason Maza
- Starring: Cobie Smulders; Richard Elis; Jessica Hynes
- Cinematography: Bet Rourich
- Edited by: Jamie Adams; Mike Hopkins
- Music by: Ashley Adams; James Walsh
- Release date: 7 September 2018
- Running time: 95 minutes
- Country: United Kingdom
- Language: English

Songbird, also alternatively titled Alright Now, is a 2018 British comedy-drama film written, and directed by Jamie Adams. It stars Cobie Smulders, Richard Elis and Jessica Hynes. The film depicts the story of a rock singer who leaves her popular indie band and enrolls in a university's marine biology program. The film was improvised, and shot in the course of five days.

== Plot ==
The plot follows Joanne Skye, a rock musician who once had a promising career as the lead singer of a popular indie band. However, her life takes a turn, and she finds herself struggling in her personal and professional life. Joanne decides to enroll in university, hoping to revitalize her music career and discover a new sense of purpose.

As Joanne navigates the challenges of student life and tries to find her place in the music scene once again, she undergoes a journey of self-discovery. The film explores themes of second chances, personal growth, and the pursuit of one's passion. Joanne's interactions with fellow students and her attempts to reconnect with her musical roots contribute to the overall narrative of the film.

== Cast ==
- Cobie Smulders as Joanne Skye
- Richard Elis as Pete
- Jessica Hynes as Sara
- Laura Patch as Kelly
- Daisy Haggard as Olivia
- Emily Atack as Mandy
- Noel Clarke as Larry
- Holli Dempsey as Tara
- Mandeep Dhillon as Susie
- Tara Lee as Hannah

== Release ==
Alright Now was released in select theatres in United States, and on video on demand on 7 September 2018. The Film Premiered at Edinburgh International Film Festival in 2018 and screened at the Moscow Film Festival the same Year.

The film was broadcast on Sky Cinema in the UK & Eire.

== Reception ==
Andrew McArthur of The People's Movies.com gave the film 3 out of 5. LA Times Critic Kate Walsh noted that "Richard Elis brings a sweetness and humility to his character...he grounds the swirling silliness in a recognisable reality."
