= Michael Price (composer) =

English composer and pianist

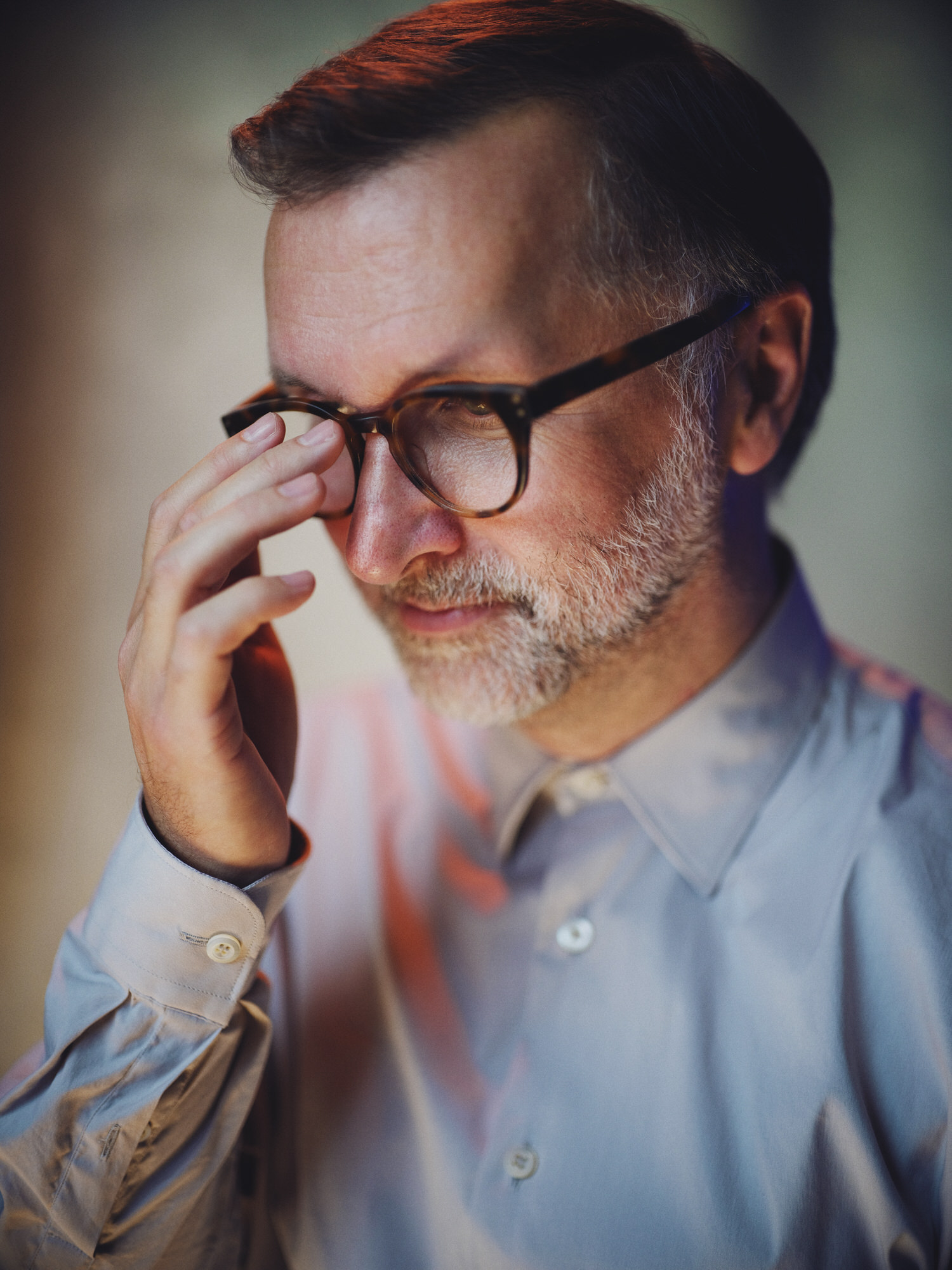

Background information
- Born: Yorkshire, England
- Genre: Contemporary classical music
- Occupations: Composer, musician
- Years active: 1996–present
- Label: Erased Tapes Records
- Website: www.michaelpricemusic.com

Michael Price is an English composer and pianist. Prior to establishing himself as a composer, he held a number of roles within the TV and film music field such as producer, arranger and music editor, much of which whilst working alongside acclaimed film score composer Michael Kamen.

== Personal life ==
The son of physics and biology teachers, Price studied music at school, before starting his music career on the Tonmeister course at Surrey University, where he won the PRS composition prize in 1990.

== Early career ==
After writing a number of scores for contemporary dance in his early 20s, he became musical director of DNA Dance and Music, whose projects included the arts council funded chamber opera "All the Garden Gold", based on the life of William Morris and the Pre-Raphaelite movement.

== Film and television ==
Prices's first film work was in 1996, when he was invited by Michael Kamen to orchestrate and program electronic sounds for the Paramount film Event Horizon. This led to a 5-year working relationship encompassing a number of film scores in London, Los Angeles and Prague, and concerts in Berlin, New York, San Francisco and Geneva. Following the production of the score to Band of Brothers, Price was approached to music edit on The Fellowship of the Ring for New Line Cinema.

Prior to work as a composer, Price worked as a music editor with films including Peter Jackson's The Lord of the Rings trilogy, Richard Curtis' Love Actually, Bridget Jones: The Edge Of Reason and Nanny McPhee. As a music editor, Michael has been nominated for 4 MPSE Golden Reel Awards, winning in 2001 for Lord of the Rings: The Fellowship of the Ring.

Price has, to date scored 31 films, increasingly focussing on contemporary drama productions. Recent highlights include his partnership with acclaimed Welsh director Craig Roberts, composing the scores for Just Jim in 2015 and Eternal Beauty in 2019. In television, recent successes include Age Before Beauty, Soulmates (TV series) and all four series of ITV's hit crime drama Unforgotten, the fourth of which premiered on 22 February 2021.

A frequent collaborator, Price often works with fellow composer David Arnold, most notably co-composing the music for all 13 episodes of Sherlock, the BBC television series created by Steven Moffat and Mark Gatiss, that premièred on BBC1 on 25 July 2010. In 2015, they also co-composed the music for ITV's Jekyll and Hyde television series which premièred in October 2015. Furthermore, Price has supported Arnold on film scores including Edgar Wright's Hot Fuzz, The Inbetweeners Movie and The Inbetweeners 2.

In addition to composing for Zentropa's Dommeren and Slingshot Studios' Sugarhouse he scored two documentaries for producer and director Alfonso Cuarón; The Possibility of Hope, and Naomi Klein's The Shock Doctrine, both in 2007. Price met Cuarón when he scored additional music for the Academy Award winning feature Children of Men, working with Cuarón as music editor.

== Solo career ==
Michael's first work to be released outside of the realms of film and television was a collection of four string quartet pieces 'A Stillness' which was released on Erased Tapes in 2012. Entanglement, his debut album (also on Erased Tapes) was released in 2015, fulfilled Michael's long-term desire to explore new musical territories, featuring Michael on the piano, with the addition of cello, soprano voice, string orchestra, modular synth, tape effects and electronics.

This was followed by Diary, 30 improvisations for solo piano, released on 1631 Recordings, and swiftly followed by his second Erased Tapes album Tender Symmetry in 2018. Tender Symmetry is a collection of orchestral and vocal works created in response to, and recorded within 7 distinctive and evocative National Trust sites. Its companion work 'Songs for Eveline' arrived in 2019.

In 2021 Price released The Hope of Better Weather a collection of 2012 piano recordings alongside new reworks by artists including Yann Tiersen, Bill Ryder-Jones, Eluvium (musician) and Malibu as well as a duet with Peter Gregson (cellist).

The Hope of Better Weather was followed in 2022 by Whitsun, a new album of contemporary compositions centred around the Klavins Una Corda piano.

In the live sphere Michael has performed as a pianist solo as well as with the ‘Michael Price Trio and Ensemble’ at venues such as the Royal Albert Hall, London, Kings Place, London, Union Chapel, London, the Casa da Musica, Porto, Reeperbahn Festival, Hamburg, and the Stadsschouwburg in Leuven.

== Other information ==
Price has worked with several music bodies and organisations, including PRS, BASCA and music charity Heart N Soul. In 2015 he was the chair of the BASCA Media Executive Committee and director of the BASCA board.

== Solo discography ==
=== Albums ===
2015	Entanglement (Erased Tapes Records)
2017	Diary (1631 Recordings)
2018	Diary Reworks (1631 Recordings)
2018	Tender Symmetry (Erased Tapes Records)
2021	The Hope of Better Weather (The Control Room)
2022	Whitsun (The Control Room)
2026	The Seasons (1914-18) (The Control Room)

=== EPs ===
2012	A Stillness (Erased Tapes Records)
2012	The Hope of Better Weather (The Control Room)
2014	Berlin 1-3 with Peter Gregson (The Control Room)
2019	Songs for Eveline (Erased Tapes Records)

=== Compilations ===
2018	Erased Tapes 1+1=X (Erased Tapes Records)
2019	Music for Brainwaves (Erased Tapes Records)

=== Remixes / reworks ===
2013	Editors - Marching Orders (Michael Price Rework)
2018	Fyfe & Iskra Strings - Arashiyama (Michael Price Remix)

=== Production ===
1999	Metallica - S&M (Vertigo Records) (Technician)
2006	Coldcut - Sound Mirrors (Ninja Tune) (Arrangement & Collaborator)
2008	Dido - Safe Trip Home (RCA Records) (Orchestrator)

== Film and television credits ==
=== Film ===
2002	Ashes & Sand
2003	LD50 Lethal Dose
2004	Some Things That Stay
2005	Dommeren (aka "The Judge")
2006	Eight Percent
2007	Dreamcatcher
2007	Blind Date (2007 film)
2007	The Possibility of Hope
2007	Sugarhouse (film)
2007	The Shock Doctrine
2008	Swan Song
2008	Agent Crush
2008	Wild Child
2009	7 Lives
2009	The Mountain Within
2010	Wild Target
2010	H. G. Wells' The First Men in the Moon
2010	Soul Flowers
2011	Island
2011	Horrid Henry: The Movie
2012	Cheerful Weather for the Wedding
2012	A Fantastic Fear of Everything
2012	My Brother Marvin
2013	Delicious
2013	Another Me
2014	The Inbetweeners 2
2014	Walter (2014 film)
2015	Just Jim (2015 film)
2016	Litterbugs
2018	Patrick (2018 film)
2019	Eternal Beauty

=== Television ===
2008	Crooked House
2010	Sherlock (TV series) S1 (with David Arnold)
2012	Sherlock (TV series) S2 (with David Arnold)
2012	Mr Stink
2012	Beyond the Search
2013	Lightfields
2013	The Tractate Middoth
2013	Gangsta Granny
2013/14	Big School
2014	Sherlock (TV series) S3 (with David Arnold)
2015	Jekyll and Hyde (TV series)
2015	Unforgotten S1
2016	Sherlock (TV series) The Abominable Bride (with David Arnold)
2017	Unforgotten S2
2017	Sherlock (TV series) S4 (with David Arnold)
2018	Unforgotten S3
2018	Age Before Beauty
2020	Dracula (2020 TV series) (with David Arnold)
2020	Soulmates (TV series)
2021	Unforgotten S4
2022	Sister Boniface Mysteries

=== Music editor ===
2001	Lord Of The Rings: The Fellowship Of The Ring
2002	Insomnia
2002	The Time Machine
2002	The Truth About Charlie
2002	The Lord Of The Rings: The Two Towers
2003	Love Actually
2002	The Lord of the Rings: The Return of the King
2004	Bridget Jones: The Edge of Reason (film)
2005	Goal!
2005	Nanny McPhee
2006	Flyboys
2006	Children of Men
2007	The Last Legion

=== Other credits ===
1997	Event Horizon (Music Co-Producer)
1997	The Winter Guest (Music Co-Producer)
1998	From The Earth To The Moon (Music Co-Producer)
1998	What Dreams May Come (Music Co-Producer)
1999	The Iron Giant (Music Co-Producer)
2000	X-Men (Music Co-Producer)
2000	Lara Croft: Tomb Raider (Music Co-Producer)
2001	Band Of Brothers (Music Co-Producer / Orchestrator / Conductor)
2006	The Da Vinci Code (Booth Reader)
2007	Hot Fuzz (Additional Music)
2008	Quantum of Solace (Additional Music arranger)

== Awards ==
- Won: (with David Arnold) Primetime Emmy Award for Outstanding Music Composition for a Miniseries, Movie, or a Special - Sherlock ("His Last Vow")
- Won: (with David Arnold) Music and Sound Award 2013 for Best Original Composition in a Television Programme - Sherlock (Season 2)
- Won: (with David Arnold) Televisual Bulldog Award 2013 for Best Music - Sherlock (Season 2)
- Won: (with David Arnold) 2010 Royal Television Award for Original Title - Sherlock (Season 1)
- Won: MPSE Golden Reel Award 2001 for Music Editor - The Lord of the Rings: The Fellowship of the Ring
