= Real Love (Yes, It's Real Love!) =

British comedy film

- Directed by: Jamie Adams
- Screenplay by: Jamie Adams
- Produced by: Kevin Proctor
- Starring: Russell Tovey; Sian Clifford; Ophelia Lovibond
- Country: United Kingdom
- Language: English

Real Love (Yes, It's Real Love!) is an upcoming British film directed by Jamie Adams and starring Russell Tovey, Sian Clifford and Ophelia Lovibond.

== Synopsis ==
Best friends Sally, Denise and Mick host a sham wedding in order to secure a sizeable inheritance.

== Cast ==
- Russell Tovey as Mick
- Sian Clifford as Sally
- Ophelia Lovibond as Stacey
- Hugh Skinner as Newman
- Nick Helm as Cousin Nick
- Laura Patch as Janie
- Richard Herring as Uncle Kieth
- Rosie Day as Denise
- Richard Elis as Steve
- Mali Ann Rees as Stephanie
- Nathan Bryon as Finbar
- Jade Franks as Patricia
- Phoebe Torrance

== Production ==
Filming took place in January 2021 using a highly improvised style. The film is produced by Kevin Proctor and executive produced by Perry Trevers. Filming locations include Margam Castle in Wales. The cast includes Russell Tovey, Sian Clifford, Ophelia Lovibond, Hugh Skinner, Nick Helm, Phoebe Torrance, Laura Patch and Richard Herring.

Director Jamie Adams has said that he and Proctor are "bringing in new thoughts and ideas on sound design" that he hasn't worked with before, as well as "new editing techniques".
