= Bittersweet Symphony =

Bittersweet Symphony may refer to:

- "Bitter Sweet Symphony", a 1997 song by The Verve
- Bittersweet Symphony (film), by Jamie Adams, 2019
