= Mia Carragher =

English actress (born 2004)

- Born: 14 May 2004 (age 22); Liverpool, England
- Education: Tring Park School for the Performing Arts; Lee Strasberg Theatre and Film Institute
- Occupation: Actress
- Years active: 2014–present
- Father: Jamie Carragher
- Family: James Carragher (brother)

Mia Carragher (born 14 May 2004) is an English stage, television, and film actress. Her television roles include The Gathering (2024). In 2025, she was cast as Katniss Everdeen in The Hunger Games: On Stage.

== Early life and education ==
Carragher was born on 14 May 2004 in Liverpool. She is the daughter of Liverpool and England international footballer Jamie Carragher and his wife Nicola. Her brother James Carragher is also a professional footballer who plays internationally for Malta and domestically for Wigan Athletic. She is of Maltese and Irish descent through her paternal grandparents.

Carragher attended Tring Park School for the Performing Arts in Hertfordshire between 2017 and 2022, and studied acting at the Lee Strasberg Theatre and Film Institute in New York, United States. She also trained at the Rare Studio in Liverpool.

== Career ==
She had an early role in football orientated film One Night in Istanbul (2014). She appeared in 2024 Channel 4 Liverpool-set mystery crime drama series The Gathering. She also had the leading role in independent short film The Watering Hole in 2024.

She has a film role in Misteltoe and Wine alongside Charlotte Kirk and Jason Isaacs, directed by Jamie Adams. She is also set to appear in the crime drama reboot series Maigret and the feature film Let’s Love alongside Martin Freeman and Malin Akerman.

In July 2025, she was cast for her theatre debut as Katniss Everdeen in the stage play adaptation of The Hunger Games, The Hunger Games: On Stage at the Troubadour Canary Wharf Theatre in London, which premiered in November 2025. She was subsequently nominated for Best Professional Debut Performance at the 2026 WhatsOnStage Awards.

== Filmography ==
Key
†	Denotes films that have not yet been released

Year	Title	Role	Notes
2014	One Night in Istanbul	Blue kid	Film
2024	The Gathering	Tash	2 episodes
2024	The Watering Hole	Liv	Short film
2026	Let's Love	TBA	Film
2026	Christmas & Chaos †	TBA	Post-production
TBA	Maigret †	TBA	Post-production

== Awards and nominations ==
Year	Award	Category	Work	Result	Ref.
2026	WhatsOnStage Award	Best Professional Debut Performance	The Hunger Games: On Stage	Nominated	
