= Benny & Jolene =

British comedy film

- Film poster
- Directed by: Jamie Adams
- Written by: Jamie Adams
- Produced by: Jamie Adams
- Starring: Craig Roberts; Charlotte Ritchie; Nick Mohammed; Tom Rosenthal; Laura Patch; Ian Smith; Keiron Self; Dolly Wells; Rosamund Hanson
- Cinematography: Ryan Owen Eddleston; Luke Jacobs
- Edited by: Sara Jones
- Music by: Ashley Adams; Andy Lovegrove; Nico Tatarowicz
- Production company: Jolene Films
- Distributed by: Verve Pictures
- Release date: 6 June 2014
- Running time: 88 minutes
- Country: United Kingdom
- Language: English

Benny & Jolene is a 2014 British comedy film written, produced and directed by Jamie Adams, and starring Charlotte Ritchie & Craig Roberts.

== Cast ==
- Craig Roberts as Benny
- Charlotte Ritchie as Jolene
- Dolly Wells as Rosamund
- Rosamund Hanson as Nadia
- Nick Mohammed as Orlando
- Richard Elis as Daz

== Reception ==
The Film was received well by Music Industry aficionados including Bethan Elfyn of BBC Radio One who described the picture as, "Charming, surprising...and adorable." Ben Cardew of the NME awarded the film seven out of ten noting, "Benny & Jolene is the cinematic equivalent of your favourite jumper: warm, welcoming and cosy, without being flashy or over refined." He sums up the film as; "...heartfelt, engaging, and very British, like the final episode of The Office or an Arctic Monkeys love song, crossed with the low budget naturalism of the US mumblecore cinema." Angie Errigo of Empire awarded the film two stars out of five.
