= Tangled Up in Blue (film) =

Upcoming drama film by Jamie Adams

- Directed by: Jamie Adams
- Written by: Jamie Adams
- Produced by: Jordan Yale Levine; Sabine Stener; Randy Kleinman
- Starring: Quentin Tarantino; Kylie Minogue; Allison Williams; RZA; Jason Isaacs; Sofia Boutella
- Production company: Visor Entertainment
- Country: United States
- Language: English

Tangled Up in Blue is an upcoming American drama film written and directed by Jamie Adams. It stars Quentin Tarantino, Kylie Minogue, Allison Williams, RZA, Jason Isaacs, and Sofia Boutella.

== Cast ==
- Quentin Tarantino
- Kylie Minogue
- Allison Williams
- RZA
- Jason Isaacs
- Sofia Boutella
- Karen Paullada
- Julian Lewis Jones
- Craig Russell
- Siwan Morris
- Gareth Milton

== Production ==
Principal photography began on June 22, 2026, in Porthcawl, Wales, United Kingdom, on a drama film by filmmaker Jamie Adams, with Quentin Tarantino and Kylie Minogue in the lead roles. Allison Williams, RZA, Jason Isaacs, Sofia Boutella, Karen Paullada, Julian Lewis Jones, Craig Russell, and Siwan Morris rounded out the cast. Tarantino and Boutella previously starred in Adams' drama film Only What We Carry (2026). Tarantino filmed his part while working on his upcoming stage play The Popinjay Cavalier (2027), which is also being developed in the United Kingdom.
