= Let's Love (film) =

British comedy film

- Release poster
- Directed by: Jamie Adams
- Written by: Jamie Adams
- Produced by: Tom George; Rebecca Long
- Starring: Martin Freeman; Josh Hutcherson; Malin Akerman; Jess Weixler; Craig Roberts
- Cinematography: Ryan Eddleston
- Edited by: Mike Hopkins; Matt Platts-Mills
- Music by: Andy Burrows
- Production companies: Happy Hour Productions; Boudica Entertainment; Principal Film Finance
- Distributed by: Cineverse
- Release date: 9 June 2026 (VOD)
- Country: United Kingdom
- Language: English

Let's Love is a 2026 British comedy film from Jamie Adams, starring Martin Freeman, Josh Hutcherson, Malin Akerman, Jess Weixler and Craig Roberts.

== Premise ==
Filmmakers and actors reunite in Wales to celebrate the ten-year anniversary of their hit film.

== Cast ==
- Martin Freeman as Nigel
- Josh Hutcherson as Jackson
- Malin Akerman as Andrea
- Jess Weixler as Jess
- Craig Roberts
- Richard Elis
- Chloé Jouannet
- Mia Carragher

== Production ==
The film is written and directed by Jamie Adams. It is produced by Tom George and Rebecca Long, Happy Hour Productions and Boudica Entertainment in association with Principal Film Finance.

The dialogue in the film is largely improvised by the cast which is led by Martin Freeman, Craig Roberts, Josh Hutcherson, Malin Akerman and Jess Weixler with Mia Carragher.

Principal photography took place in Wales in 2024. Filming locations include Cardiff, the Brecon Beacons, Porthcawl and at Dragon Studios in Bridgend.

== Release ==
Let's Love was released on video on demand on 9 June 2026.
