= Pink Wall =

2019 British independent romantic drama film

- Film poster
- Directed by: Tom Cullen
- Written by: Tom Cullen
- Produced by: Jamie Adams; Richard Elis; Maggie Monteith
- Starring: Tatiana Maslany; Jay Duplass
- Cinematography: Bobby Shore
- Edited by: Gina Hirsch
- Production companies: Dignity Film Finance; Talland Films
- Release date: 9 March 2019 (South by Southwest)
- Running time: 85 minutes
- Country: United Kingdom
- Language: English

Pink Wall is a 2019 British independent romantic drama film written and directed by Tom Cullen and starring Tatiana Maslany and Jay Duplass. It is Cullen's directorial debut.

== Plot ==
Pink Wall is the story of a couple's struggles with the pressures of gender expectations.

== Cast ==
- Tatiana Maslany as Jenna
- Jay Duplass as Leon
- Sule Rimi as Scott
- Ruth Ollman as Layla
- Sarah Ovens as Jess
- T.J. Richardson as Frankie
- Kyle Lima as Obi

== Reception ==
Pink Wall received generally positive critical reviews. As of October 2021, 74% of the 27 reviews compiled on Rotten Tomatoes are positive, with an average rating of 6.7/10.

Ella Kemp of Empire awarded the film four stars out of five.

David Ehrlich of IndieWire graded the film a B.

Clarisse Loughrey of The Independent awarded the film three stars out of five.

Brian Tallerico of RogerEbert.com gave the film a positive review and wrote that it “ works because Cullen trusts his very talented performers, building characters with them and then amplifying the themes of their journey through his experimental visual language. It’s an ultimately moving, very impressive debut.”

Chris Longo of Den of Geek awarded the film three and a half stars out of five.
