= Nico Tatarowicz =

British actor and writer (born 1974)

- Born: 23 April 1974 (age 52)
- Occupations: Αctor, writer
- Years active: 2004–present
- Website: http://www.nicotatarowicz.me/

Nico Tatarowicz (born 23 April 1974) is a British actor and writer, known for The Armstrong & Miller Show (BAFTA winner) (2007), Very Important People (2012), Crackanory (Broadcasting Press Guild Award Winner) (2013), Shooting Stars and Murder in Successville (BAFTA winner) (2015–2017).

== Career ==
Nico Tatarowicz has written and co-written comedy, mainly for TV, since around 2005. Formerly writing alongside David-Cadji-Newby, the pair's material made its debut on Channel 5's relationship sketch-show Swinging. This led to a commission to write for BBC 1's The Armstrong & Miller Show, which they contributed to over three series.

The pair began working on their own projects and Tatarowicz switched to writing material that he could perform himself as well as for other people. His self-penned E4 Funny Cut The Viewing was broadcast in August 2008 to critical acclaim. He has since appeared as a character performer in several productions including Murder In Successville as 'Sid Lowecroft', Crackanory, The Warm-Up Guy, and Morgana Robinson's Very Important People (as Liam Gallagher). In 2012, Tatarowicz also pitched and shot a low-budget mini-pilot for a spoof rock-doc about The Stone Roses, which though never picked up, was put online.

In 2008, Tatarowicz provided the opening voice-over for the comeback series of Shooting Stars, and did some character voices on some of the same series sketches.

His written work includes several stories written over 4 series of TV Station Dave Crackanory, with his stories read by Jack Dee, Harry Enfield, Vic Reeves, Emilia Fox, Carrie Fisher, Paul Whitehouse and a double-length story read by Sheridan Smith.

In 2016, Tatarowicz wrote a one-off special for BBC2 show Morgana Robinson's The Agency, set around Robinson's take on Natalie Cassidy going through a day from hell.

In 2017, he co-wrote ITV2 espionage comedy Action Team with Tom Davis and James De Frond. The series was broadcast in 2018.

Tatarowicz has written three humour books with sometime collaborator and friend Jason Hazeley - they are What Not to Say to Your Wife, What Not to Say to Your Husband, and the pandemic-based Instructions for the British Citizens During the Emergency. The pair also wrote together across 2 series of Spitting Image in 2020-2021 on Britbox. He is also a podcaster, his podcast project Stupid Hearts Club features comedy chat and conversations around mental health. He often appears on Matt Morgan's Patreon Podcast, and previously recorded episodes of a podcast called Sick Minds with writer Alistair Griggs.

Tatarowicz has contributed music to various productions including spoof songs for Liam Gallagher and Adele on Very Important People and 2014 Cinema release Benny & Jolene. In 2017 Nico contributed a tongue-in-cheek fictional Britpop hit to the indie-film Songbird directed by Jamie Adams.

His love for music began when his uncle provided him with a guitar which once belonged to Earl Slick's niece and had been previously used during a Ono studio session for Season of Glass. Being a big Beatles fan from conception, Nico was more than appreciative and it spurred him to engage in rigorous practice. He was rejected from local Manchester Bands Charles Darwen and Hulme Alone. He regularly performs around the Brighton area on a regular basis.
