= Good Posture =

2019 comedy film by Dolly Wells

- Theatrical release poster
- Directed by: Dolly Wells
- Written by: Dolly Wells
- Produced by: Maggie Monteith; Jamie Adams
- Starring: Grace Van Patten; Emily Mortimer; Ebon Moss-Bachrach; Timm Sharp; John Early
- Cinematography: Ryan Eddleston
- Edited by: Adelina Bichis
- Production companies: Dignity Film Finance; Talland Films; Twenty Dollar Pictures
- Distributed by: Pinpoint Presents
- Release dates: April 27, 2019 (Tribeca); October 4, 2019 (United Kingdom)
- Running time: 91 minutes
- Country: United States
- Language: English
- Box office: $36,647

Good Posture is a 2019 American comedy-drama film written and directed by actress Dolly Wells, in her directorial debut. It stars Grace Van Patten as Lilian, a young woman who moves in with her father's friend, the famous and reclusive author Julia played by Emily Mortimer. Wells and Mortimer had previously collaborated on the British sitcom Doll & Em, which they created, co-wrote, and starred in.

The film also stars Timm Sharp, Ebon Moss-Bachrach, John Early and Nat Wolff, with cameos from authors Zadie Smith, Martin Amis and Jonathan Ames.

== Plot ==
Lilian is a budding artist living in Brooklyn after her father abruptly moved to Paris with his girlfriend. After her boyfriend Nate dumps her for being immature and unmotivated, Lilian moves in with family friends Julia and Don.

While Don, a musician, is warm and friendly, Julia, a famous and reclusive novelist, immediately clashes with Lilian. After Don disappears following a fight with Julia, Julia sequesters herself in her room and begins communicating with Lilian through messages in Lilian's private journal.

After running into Nate and his co-worker, Laura, a filmmaker, Lilian claims she is working on a documentary about Julia, to impress her. Rather than ask Julia for permission, Lilian begins scouting for cameramen and uses her father's connections to contact famous writers and interview them about Julia.

While interviewing Jonathan Ames, Lilian learns that her father is back in New York City but has not contacted her. She also learns that Julia is using her as possible writing inspiration and has used her as inspiration before, when she was a child.

Julia accidentally discovers that Lilian is making a documentary when Lilian is late to meet her cameraman, Sol, and he enthusiastically tells Julia everything. Julia cuts off all communication with Lilian. Depressed, Lilian makes a move on Julia's reclusive dog walker George, who rebuffs her.

Lilian finally makes contact with her father who does not tell her that he and his girlfriend are engaged and expecting a child, despite Lilian having been made aware by other people.

Lilian decides to try to make amends with Julia by writing her an apology note and finally reading her most famous work, Good Posture. Lilian obtains a job and decides to leave Julia's home. Before she leaves, Julia allows her into her room indicating she has forgiven Lilian.

The following morning, as Lilian leaves, she sees Julia outside for the first time, walking her dog. Julia meets Don and the two walk towards the subway together, as Lilian walks in the other direction.

== Cast ==
- Grace Van Patten as Lilian
- Emily Mortimer as Julia Price
- Timm Sharp as George
- Ebon Moss-Bachrach as Don Price
- John Early as Sol
- Nat Wolff as Jon
- Norbert Leo Butz as Neil
- Condola Rashad as Laura
- Mary Holland as Pauline
- Gary Richardson as Nate

The film contains cameo appearances from authors Zadie Smith, Martin Amis and Jonathan Ames.

== Production ==
The screenplay was written by Wells, and it took ten days to film in Brooklyn, New York.

== Release ==
The film had its world premiere at the Tribeca Film Festival on April 27, 2019. It was released in select theaters in the United Kingdom and Ireland on October 4, 2019, by Pinpoint Presents.

== Critical reception ==
On Rotten Tomatoes the film has an approval rating of 95% based on reviews from 20 critics, with an average score of 6.6/10. On Metacritic the film has a score of 69 out of 100, based on reviews from 8 critics.

Critics were generally favorable on the film's debut. Tomris Laffly of Variety stated that "Dolly Wells' good-natured directorial debut can't escape a first-film feel" the critic also found it "just affable enough" and singled out actress Grace Van Patten for a "sensational" performance. David Ehrlich, writing for IndieWire, found the film "more than enjoyable enough to suggest that Wells is no slouch" but "more of a snack than a fulfilling meal" that "struggles to find its focus" Kimber Myers, critic for The Playlist, praised the film, and wrote: "Wells' script is genuine and funny, authentic in its insights into real-feeling humans and their connections" and that it "treats its audience with intelligence and doesn't feel the need to explain everything, trusting the viewer will have what they need to understand what's happening and who these people are."
