= Signature Entertainment =

UK film company

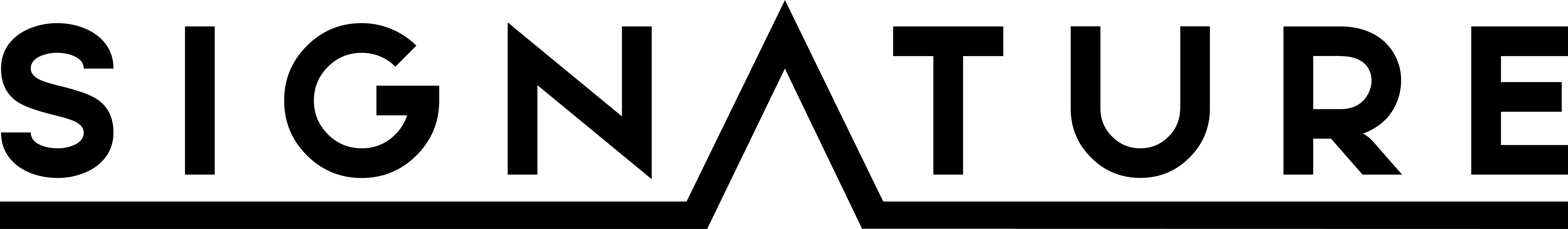
- Industry: Production and distribution
- Founded: 2011
- Founder: Marc Goldberg
- Headquarters: UK and United States
- Subsidiaries: Signature Films (2018)
- Website: https://www.signature-entertainment.co.uk/

Signature Entertainment is a British film distribution and film production company founded in 2011 in the UK.

== Overview ==
Signature Entertainment was founded in 2011 by Marc Goldberg. The company released over 1,000 films since its inception and became an independent label in the UK. The company's releases include Rami Malek prison escape drama Papillon and Sam Neill comedy Rams, the number 1 UK box-office hit Honest Thief, A Rainy Day in New York starring Timothée Chalamet, the Brian Epstein biopic Midas Man, the Liam Neeson thriller The Ice Road, the festival lauded thriller Bull, and the animated film Ozi: Voice of the Forest.

After executive producing 12 films, in 2018 Goldberg set up Signature Films, the film production arm of the company. Signature Films has produced or co-produced several movies such as Into the Deep, She is Love, The Courier (2019; starring Gary Oldman and Olga Kurylenko), The Hatton Garden Job (starring Larry Lamb, Matthew Goode and Stephen Moyer), Confession (starring Moyer and Colm Meaney) and Final Score (starring Dave Bautista and Pierce Brosnan).

In April 2018, FFI, the holding company of Film Finances Inc. acquired Signature Entertainment which was later re-acquired by its original stakeholders in 2021.

By February 17, 2025, Signature Entertainment picked up the UK and Irish distribution rights for Red Sonja and set a theatrical release of late 2025.

== Film awards ==
- Screen Award 2015 - Predestination
- Screen Award 2015 - Rising Star
- BASE Award 2016 - Predestination
- BASE Award 2018 - The Hatton Garden Job
