= Schemers (film) =

Scottish biopic

- Film poster
- Written by: Kyle Titterton, Dave McLean, Khaled Spiewak
- Starring: Conor Berry; Tara Lee; Sean Conner; Grant Robert Keelan; Mingus Johnston
- Cinematography: Alan C. McLaughlin
- Release dates: 29 June 2019 (EIFF); 25 September 2020
- Running time: 90 minutes
- Country: Scotland
- Language: English

Schemers is a 2019 Scottish film written by Dave McLean & Kyle Titterton, based on Dave's early life in Dundee, prior to becoming the manager of Placebo.

It was released in the UK and Ireland on 25 September 2020.

== Plot ==
In 1979 Dundee, Davie sets out to become a gig promoter. His ambition is threatened by a run-in with a local gangster who owns all the venues. To succeed he must pull off an Iron Maiden gig.

== Cast ==
- Conor Berry as Davie
- Sean Connor as Scot
- Grant Robert Keelan as John
- Tara Lee as Shona
- Kit Clark as Wullie McClean
- Blair Robertson as Pike
- Mingus Johnston as Kenny
- Paula Masterton as Anne
- Carolyn Bonnyman as Moyra
- Alastair Thomson Mills as Fergie
- Reanne Farley as Chrissy
- Jade Cuthbert as Jade (Kenny’s Boyfriend)

== Reception ==
On Rotten Tomatoes, the film has a 41% approval rating, based on 17 reviews.
