= The Green Hollow =

2016 film directed by Pip Broughton

The Green Hollow (or Aberfan: The Green Hollow) is a "film-poem", which was broadcast by the BBC on 21 October 2016 to mark the fiftieth anniversary of the Aberfan disaster of 1966. Owen Sheers wrote the script of the screenplay using the words of survivors of the disaster whom he interviewed over a period.

Sheers described The Green Hollow as “a film poem in the voice of Aberfan, both then and now”. The work falls into three sections: “Children”, “Rescuers” and “Survivors”. Actors who participated in the film, reading in the authentic voices of those who witnessed the disaster, included Michael Sheen, Jonathan Pryce, Siân Phillips, Eve Myles, Robert Pugh and Iwan Rheon, and the film was directed by Pip Broughton. Sheers said that he had at first been doubtful about the project because he did not want to exploit the grief of the local community. He later concluded that "I realized that this small community had become defined by the disaster and I wanted to show what the place was like before that."

The poem was published in book form by Faber & Faber in 2018. Sheers said that the incremental sense of menace in the book was "a feeling that’s got stronger with its eventual publication ... because of the physical entity of the book".

== Reception ==
Award	Date of ceremony	Category	Recipient	Result	Ref.
British Academy Television Award	14 May 2017	Best Single Drama	Aberfan: The Green Hollow	Nominated	
BAFTA Cymru	8 October 2017	Best Television Drama	Aberfan: The Green Hollow	Won	
BAFTA Cymru	8 October 2017	Best Director: Fiction	Pip Broughton	Nominated	
BAFTA Cymru	8 October 2017	Best Actress	Eiry Thomas	Nominated	
BAFTA Cymru	8 October 2017	Best Actor	Michael Sheen	Nominated	
BAFTA Cymru	8 October 2017	Breakthrough Award	Jenna Robbins	Won	
BAFTA Cymru	8 October 2017	Best Writer	Owen Sheers	Won	
BAFTA Cymru	8 October 2017	Best Photography and Lighting Fiction	Steve Lawes	Nominated	
