= Just Jim (2015 film) =

- British poster
- Directed by: Craig Roberts
- Written by: Craig Roberts
- Produced by: Adrian Bate; Pip Broughton
- Starring: Craig Roberts; Emile Hirsch
- Cinematography: Richard Stoddard
- Edited by: Stephen Haren
- Music by: Michael Price
- Production companies: Vox Pictures; BBC Films
- Distributed by: Soda Pictures
- Release dates: 14 March 2015 (SXSW); 25 September 2015 (UK)
- Running time: 84 minutes
- Country: United Kingdom
- Language: English
- Budget: £300,000

Just Jim is a 2015 Welsh comedy horror psychological thriller film written and directed by Craig Roberts in his directorial debut. The film stars Roberts as a lonely Welsh teenager who is given the chance to increase his popularity when a cool American (Emile Hirsch) moves in next door

== Plot summary ==
Jim, a lonely sixteen‑year‑old boy from Wales, spends most of his time with his dog. After the dog dies, he becomes even more isolated. His routine changes when Dean, a confident American teenager who moves in next door, enters his life and draws his attention.

== Cast ==
- Craig Roberts as Jim
- Emile Hirsch as Dean
- Ryan Owen as Michael
- Charlotte Randall as Jackie
- Nia Roberts as Mum
- Aneirin Hughes as Dad
- Mark Lewis Jones as Donald
- Sai Bennett as Michelle
- Trystan Gravelle as John
- Richard Harrington as Headmaster
- Helen Griffin as Beatrice
- Darragh Mortell as The Bed Boy

== Release ==
The film premiered at South by Southwest on 14 March 2015 and was released in the United Kingdom on 25 September 2015.

== Reception ==
The film has received generally positive reviews from critics, holding an 85% approval rating on Rotten Tomatoes based on 13 reviews. John DeFore of The Hollywood Reporter states in his review: "A misshapen but nicely dressed coming-of-age film." Fionnuala Halligan of ScreenDaily says "As a directorial debut, though, Just Jim is an encouraging start for Roberts, should he ever wish to give up the day job."
