= Rosa Robson =

English actress and comedian

- Born: Rosa Grace Robson; 29 February 1992 (age 34)
- Education: Homerton College, Cambridge
- Years active: 2012–present
- Spouse: Paapa Essiedu (m. 2023)

Rosa Grace Robson (born 29 February 1992) is an English actress and comedian. On television, she is known for her role in the ITV2 sitcom Buffering (2021–23). Her films include She Is Love (2022).

== Early life ==
Robson is from Frome, Somerset. She completed her A Levels at Frome Community College in 2010. She went on to graduate from Homerton College, Cambridge. During her time at university, she was a member of Footlights, Pembroke Players, and the Marlowe Society.

== Career ==
In 2012, while still at university, Robson formed a comedy duo called Beard with fellow Footlights member Matilda Wnek; the duo made their debut at the Edinburgh Fringe Festival that year. They returned to the Edinburgh Fringe in 2014, 2015, and 2018. Robson and Wnek featured in a 2015 Vice article about female comedy duos.

Also in 2015, Robson made both her feature film debut and her television debut as Louise Cabaye in Jamie Adams' Black Mountain Poets and in an episode of Nick Helm's Heavy Entertainment respectively. In 2016, she worked with the Royal Shakespeare Company in Stratford-upon-Avon on the productions Doctor Faustus, Don Quixote, and The Alchemist. Robson would return to Don Quixote in 2018 at the Garrick Theatre, marking her West End debut.

In 2021, Robson began starring as Ashley in the ITV2 sitcom Buffering. She also had a recurring role as Lara in the BBC One crime comedy The Outlaws and made a guest appearance in an installment of the BBC Two anthology series Inside No. 9. Robson reunited with director Jamie Adams for his 2022 film She Is Love. She has a role in the second season of the Disney+ Star superhero comedy series Extraordinary. In 2024, Rosa Robson played Sarah in Sami Ibrahim's Multiple Casualty Incident at The Yard Theatre, London. In 2025, she starred in the three-hander sci-fi comedy feature film Universal, alongside Joe Thomas and Kelley Mack.

== Personal life ==
Robson is married to fellow actor Paapa Essiedu; they had been in a relationship for six years as of 2022. In October 2014, Robson and Wnek attended an Occupy London protest in Parliament Square and were arrested for refusing police orders to leave. They were later acquitted by District Judge Richard Blake.

== Filmography ==
=== Film ===
| Year | Title | Role | Notes |
|---|---|---|---|
| 2015 | Black Mountain Poets | Louise Cabaye | |
| 2022 | She Is Love | Kate | |
| 2022 | Green Space | Interloper | Short film |
| 2025 | Universal | Naomi | |

=== Television ===
| Year | Title | Role | Notes |
|---|---|---|---|
| 2015 | Nick Helm's Heavy Entertainment | The Girlfriend | Episode: "Romance" |
| 2021 | Inside No. 9 | Hortensia | Episode: "Wuthering Heist" |
| 2021–2023 | Buffering | Ashley | Main role, 12 episodes |
| 2021–2022 | The Outlaws | Lara | 2 episodes |
| 2022 | Small Doses | Laura | Pilot |
| 2022 | Ellie & Natasia | Various | 1 episode |
| 2022 | Sneakerhead | Travel Agent | 1 episode |
| 2023 | Big Boys | Beth | Episode: "All Work and No Play Makes Jack a Dull Gay" |
| 2023, 2024 | Extraordinary | Woman with Kid / Nora | 1 episode (series 1), and 4 episodes (series 2) |

== Stage ==
| Year | Title | Role | Notes |
|---|---|---|---|
| 2016 | Doctor Faustus | Covetousness / Scholar | Swan Theatre, Stratford-upon-Avon |
| 2016, 2018 | Don Quixote | Niece | Swan Theatre, Stratford-upon-Avon / Garrick Theatre, London |
| 2016 | The Alchemist | Dame Pliant | Swan Theatre, Stratford-upon-Avon |
| 2016 | Ricky Whittington and His Cat | Mrs Hickerty Crickerty | New Diorama Theatre, London |
| 2017 | Siren | Siren | Edinburgh Fringe Festival |
| 2019 | A Table Tennis Play | Cath | Edinburgh Fringe Festival |
| 2024 | Multiple Casualty Incident | Sarah | The Yard Theatre, London |
