= Black Church Bay =

- Directed by: Rhys Marc Jones
- Produced by: Alex Polunin; Tristan Goligher
- Starring: Tom Cullen; Joe Locke; Marli Siu
- Music by: Oliver Coates
- Production companies: Ossian International; The Bureau
- Release date: 2026
- Running time: 110 mins
- Country: United Kingdom
- Language: English

Black Church Bay is a 2026 thriller film directed by Rhys Marc Jones, set on the island of Anglesey, Wales. It stars Tom Cullen and Joe Locke.

== Synopsis ==
Jasper, an openly gay sixth form student, spends a weekend sailing around Church Bay with his secret lover, Barry. He subsequently disappears and the unfolding events threaten to tear the Welsh coastal community apart as Barry turns out to be Jasper's teacher, who will go to great lengths to conceal his double life and his involvement in the disappearance.

== Cast ==
- Tom Cullen as Barry
- Joe Locke as Jasper
- Marli Siu as Kelly
- Rakie Ayola as Mrs Munro
- Julian Lewis Jones as Maclean

== Production ==
Black Church Bay was filmed on Anglesey in Wales. The writer and director, Rhys Marc Jones, said he'd written the film with the location in mind. He said he "needed a location that could be beautifully idyllic and hopeful and then turn and become brutally unforgiving" and that Anglesey "can be absolutely stunning but has a foreboding quality".

Partly filmed on a boat, there were difficulties because a very limited film crew were allowed on board, in addition to two licensed skippers.

The film was developed with BBC Film, iFeatures and Cannes’ Cinéfondation Résidence. It was funded by BBC Film, Ffilm Cymru Wales (awarding National Lottery Funding) and Screen Scotland, as well as private financiers.

Principal photography was completed in September 2025.

== Release ==
Black Church Bay premiered at the London Film Festival on 15 October 2026. It had its Wales premiere at Iris20 on 18 October 2026.

The film is due for general release in Spring 2027.
