= The Suspect (TV series) =

2022 British television series

- Genre: Police procedural
- Written by: Peter Berry
- Directed by: James Strong, Camilla Strøm Henriksen (ep. 4, 5)
- Starring: Aidan Turner; Shaun Parkes; Anjli Mohindra; Sian Clifford; Camilla Beeput; Adam James; Bobby Schofield; Bronagh Waugh; Angela Griffin; Tom McKay
- Theme music composer: Glenn Gregory, Berenice Scott
- Country of origin: United Kingdom
- Original language: English
- No. of series: 1
- No. of episodes: 5

Production
- Producer: Natasha Romaniuk
- Production location: London
- Cinematography: Matt Gray (3 episodes), Nick Dance (2 episodes)
- Production company: World Productions

Original release
- Network: ITV
- Release: 29 August – 26 September 2022

The Suspect is a British police procedural television series in five episodes based on Michael Robotham's 2004 novel The Suspect. Screenwritten by Peter Berry and produced by Natasha Romaniuk, the first episode aired on ITV on Monday 29 August 2022.

The thriller stars Aidan Turner in the title role of Joe O'Loughlin, a clinical psychologist. The series was filmed during 2021 in various locations in London.

== Synopsis ==
A woman is found in a shallow grave in a cemetery. The postmortem reveals that she has been stabbed 21 times, self inflicted. Asked by the police for his advice on the crime, Joe O'Loughlin a clinical psychologist, reveals that the woman was a former patient and following a series of apparent coincidences and circumstantial evidence he becomes suspected of the murder.

== Cast ==
- Aidan Turner as Joe O'Loughlin
- Shaun Parkes as DI Vince Ruiz
- Anjli Mohindra as DS Riya Devi
- Sian Clifford as Fenwick
- Camilla Beeput as Julianne
- Adam James as Gerald Owens
- Bobby Schofield as Bobby Moran
- Bronagh Waugh as Cara
- Angela Griffin as Melinda
- Katy Carmichael as Bridget Aherne
- Tara Lee as Catherine McCain
- Tom McKay as DJ

== Episodes ==
No.	Title	Directed by	Written by	Original release date	UK viewers (millions)
1	"Episode 1"	James Strong	Peter Berry	29 August 2022	5.09
2	"Episode 2"	James Strong	Peter Berry	5 September 2022	4.12
3	"Episode 3"	James Strong	Peter Berry	12 September 2022	3.86
4	"Episode 4"	Camilla Strøm Henriksen	Peter Berry	20 September 2022	3.87
5	"Episode 5"	Camilla Strøm Henriksen	Peter Berry	26 September 2022	3.81

== Critical response ==
A review of the TV series in The Independent states "The dialogue is far too flimsy to effectively gloss over anything; plot holes fall out the characters’ mouths with a clang" but does admit to it being 'strangely compelling'.
