= Christmas & Chaos =

British independent film

- Release poster
- Directed by: Jamie Adams
- Screenplay by: Jamie Adams
- Produced by: Charlotte Kirk; Karlos Way
- Starring: Charlotte Kirk; Ben McGregor; Jason Isaacs; Stefanie Martini; Tanya Burr
- Cinematography: Benny J. Smith
- Edited by: Mike Hopkins
- Music by: Randy Kalsi
- Production company: Primal Empire Studios
- Distributed by: Strike Media
- Release date: 9 November 2026 (VOD)
- Country: United Kingdom
- Language: English

Christmas & Chaos is an upcoming British Christmas romantic comedy film directed by Jamie Adams and starring Charlotte Kirk, Stefanie Martini, Ben McGregor, Tanya Burr and Jason Isaacs.

== Cast ==
- Charlotte Kirk as Sadie Peters
- Ben McGregor as Jasper
- Jason Isaacs as Spencer
- Stefanie Martini
- Tanya Burr as Rachel
- Craig Russell
- Mia Carragher

== Production ==
The film is written and directed by Jamie Adams. It is produced by Primal Empire Studios. Producers include Charlotte Kirk and Karlos Ways.

The cast is led by Kirk and Ben McGregor and also includes Mia Carragher, Stefanie Martini, Tanya Burr and Jason Isaacs, with Principal photography taking place in Cornwall in January 2025.

Archstone Entertainment were handling sales in May 2025.

== Release ==
Christmas & Chaos is scheduled to be released on digital on 9 November 2026.
