= The Hunger Games: On Stage =

2025 play by Conor McPherson

- Original language: English
- Written by: Conor McPherson
- Based on: The Hunger Games by Suzanne Collins The Hunger Games by Gary Ross
- Characters: Katniss Everdeen; Peeta Mellark; Haymitch Abernathy; Gale Hawthorne; Effie Trinket; Caesar Flickerman
- Genre: Adventure; Dystopia; Science fiction
- Setting: Panem

Premiere
- Date: 12 November 2025
- Place: Troubadour Canary Wharf Theatre, London
- Directed by: Matthew Dunster
- Official website

The Hunger Games: On Stage is a play by Irish playwright Conor McPherson. Based on both the 2008 novel The Hunger Games by Suzanne Collins and its 2012 film adaptation, it follows Katniss Everdeen as she competes in a televised battle royale in dystopian Panem. The play premiered at the purpose-built Troubadour Canary Wharf Theatre in London on 12 November 2025, with direction by Matthew Dunster.

== Development ==
A stage adaptation of The Hunger Games was first announced in 2014 by Lionsgate Films, the studio behind the film adaptation. At the time, the play was expected to open in 2016 at a purpose-built theatre next to Wembley Stadium, with Robin de Levita serving as one of its producers. However, this play did not materialise. In 2018, producer Tristan Baker had a meeting with Lionsgate about a different project, and began developing the adaptation after a suggestion from a studio executive. Baker had worked with McPherson on Girl from the North Country, a musical based on the works of Bob Dylan, and thought he would be interested in adapting The Hunger Games. Coincidentally, McPherson's daughter was reading the novel at the time. Baker asked Matthew Dunster to direct, whose children were also reading the novel at the time; Baker and Dunster had previously collaborated on a production of 2:22 A Ghost Story.

McPherson and Dunster's involvement was announced in October 2023, with the show scheduled for a premiere in London in the second half of 2024. At the same time, members of the creative team were announced, including Miriam Buether as stage designer and Charlotte Broom as choreographer. McPherson received permission from Collins to incorporate details from later novels in the series, including prequel Sunrise on the Reaping (2025). Collins also had conversations with McPherson about the motivations of various characters and the philosophical bases of the story, including Thomas Hobbes and David Hume. In addition, some scenes are new to the play and some of the original novel's unnamed characters are given names. The production's premiere was later delayed to the following year, with the venue announced as the purpose-built Troubadour Canary Wharf Theatre.

== London production ==
Previews for the London production began on 20 October 2025, with opening night on 12 November, and a run extended through to 18 October 2026. Following this date, performances from 23 October 2026 to 14 February 2027 star new actors for most of the roles.

=== Staging ===
Stage and seats at the Troubadour Canary Wharf Theatre

Due to the rigging system and stage lifts needed for the production, the play's creative team explained that it was easier to create their own venue than use an existing West End theatre. Plans for the theatre first started in 2020, but were interrupted due to the impact of the COVID-19 pandemic; construction on the site began in early 2025 and took place over eight months. The Troubadour Canary Wharf Theatre is a theatre-in-the-round that has a capacity of 1,200, covers 2,250 m^{2} (24,200 sq ft), and reportedly cost £26 million to build. It was constructed on reclaimed land and made use of six cranes to piece together 42,000 pieces of steel. It contains London's largest hydraulic stage and its ceiling contains a lattice of metal rods capable of supporting up to four tonnes. Audience seats—some of which move during the show—are located in specific districts, with the stage being District 12. There are no wings, which means that most of the cast members and sets appear from above or under the stage. In addition, the production incorporates scenes that make use of pyrotechnics. After the production closes, 95% of the theatre can be packed up into 150 lorries and moved to another location.

=== Casting ===
I very quickly got the idea that if the young people that play the tributes were also pretty much playing everyone else, then you would fall in love with them as performers. Then the horror that is visited upon them would be even more devastating.

— Director Matthew Dunster on having cast members play multiple roles

A workshop was held with an ensemble cast in 2022, while the lead roles were cast in early 2025. A pool of around 200 dancers was narrowed down to 50 for fighting workshops, which eventually became 10 possible actors. Collins and Lionsgate were involved in the final decisions for casting. In July 2025, it was announced that Mia Carragher would play the lead role of Katniss Everdeen. The rest of the cast was announced the following month, including Euan Garrett as Peeta Mellark, Joshua Lacey as Haymitch Abernathy, Tristan Waterson as Gale Hawthorne, Tamsin Carroll as Effie Trinket, and Stavros Demetraki as Caesar Flickerman. With the exception of Carragher and Garrett, all cast members play multiple roles. Carragher underwent vocal coaching and archery training to prepare for the role. Workshops were held starting in August 2025 at the Sadler's Wells before the Troubadour was ready. In October 2025, it was announced that John Malkovich would portray Coriolanus Snow for the production in a pre-recorded on-screen appearance. Malkovich's scenes were filmed in one session, with the other cast members present for the shooting.

=== Critical reception ===
The London production received mixed reviews from critics. Arifa Akbar of The Guardian praised the costumes and staging but says "the emotion gets lost amid the action". Sarah Hemming of Financial Times also felt there was a lack of emotion, calling the show "a curiously empty spectacle". Katherine Cowles of The Observer complimented the "technically impressive production" but felt it prioritised "experience over heartfelt drama or storytelling". Writing for The Independent, Alice Saville shared this sentiment and felt underwhelmed by the production's staging. Claire Allfree of The Telegraph was more critical, calling it a "depressingly bad adaptation", feeling that the "unexciting production fails to reimagine and revitalise its source material". Clive Davis of The Times was also disappointed, and criticised its slow pacing, calling it "oddly underpowered". Fiona Mountford of The i Paper was similarly critical, calling it "an underwhelming trudge". Andrzej Lukowski of Time Out called the production "solid", but felt that having Katniss be both the protagonist and narrator hindered the pacing.

== Cast and characters ==
Character	London 2025
Katniss Everdeen	Mia Carragher
Peeta Mellark	Euan Garrett
Haymitch Abernathy	Joshua Lacey
Gale	Tristan Waterson
Prim	Sophia Ally
Mrs. Everdeen	Ruth Everett
Effie Trinket	Tamsin Carroll
Caesar Flickerman	Stavros Demetraki
Cinna	Nathan Ives-Moiba
Rue	Aiya Agustin
President Snow	John Malkovich

=== Notable cast replacements ===
- Haymitch Abernathy: Neil McDermott
- Caesar Flickerman: Daniel Brocklebank

== Awards and nominations ==
=== 2025 West End production ===
Year	Award	Category	Work	Result	Ref.
2026	WhatsOnStage Award	Best Professional Debut Performance	Mia Carragher	Nominated	
