= Sofia Boutella =

Algerian actress (born 1982)

- Boutella in 2026
- Born: 3 April 1982 (age 44); Bab El Oued, Algiers, Algeria
- Education: Berklee College of Music
- Occupations: Actress; dancer; model
- Years active: 1998–present
- Father: Safy Boutella

Sofia Boutella (Arabic: صوفيا بوتلة; born 3 April 1982) is an Algerian actress, dancer and model. Born in Algiers, she immigrated to Paris at the age of 10. Shortly thereafter, she started rhythmic gymnastics, joining the French national team at the age of 18. She began dancing in film and television shows, as well as in commercials and concerts. She was one of Madonna's backup dancers for six years, performing in numerous music videos and at the 2012 Super Bowl. As an actress, her breakthrough role came in 2012 in the British film StreetDance 2.

She went on to appear in the well-received films Kingsman: The Secret Service (2014), Star Trek Beyond (2016), Atomic Blonde (2017), Climax (2019), Prisoners of the Ghostland (2021), and the Rebel Moon duology (2023, 2024), among others. In 2017, she portrayed the titular character in the American fantasy action-adventure film The Mummy. As a model, Boutella has featured in a series of Nike ads and videos, choreographed by creative director Jamie King.

== Early life ==
Sofia Boutella was born in the Bab El Oued district of Algiers, Algeria, to an architect mother and a jazz musician father, Safy Boutella. Her brother, Seif, works as a visual effects artist in the entertainment industry. Her surname means "the men of the mountains". She was raised in a household that cultivated artistic expression and creativity. Boutella described her childhood as a happy one, stating that she was "blessed to be born into a family that allowed me to express myself, to be myself and let out all sorts of colours that were living in my imagination and in my heart."

With her family's encouragement, Boutella started classical dance education when she was five years old. In 1992, at the age of 10, she left Algeria with her family in the midst of the Algerian Civil War and moved to France. Shortly thereafter, she started rhythmic gymnastics, joining the French national team at age 18.

== Dancing career ==
Growing up in Paris, Boutella was exposed to many more forms of dance, particularly hip hop and street-dance, which intrigued her for offering more "freedom" compared to the more disciplined styles of ballet and gymnastics. She joined a group called the Vagabond Crew, which won the Battle of the Year in 2006, and participated in a spin-off group called "Chiennes de Vie and Aphrodites". She has cited Fred Astaire, Jean-Michel Basquiat, Daniel Day-Lewis, and Bob Fosse as artistic influences.

Her breakthrough as a dancer came in 2007, when she was picked for the Jamie King choreography for Nike Women's "Keep Up" campaign, serving as a role model of femininity and hip-hop. This was a major boost to her career and led to more work alongside stars like Madonna, in her Confessions Tour, Sticky & Sweet Tour, Super Bowl XLVI and Rihanna. She credits her work with Madonna for helping her learn English.

Boutella successfully auditioned for the Michael Jackson This Is It tour, but could not attend due to the extension of the Madonna tour, whose dates coincided with the Jackson tour. She was the main character in the music video for "Hollywood Tonight" by Michael Jackson in February 2011.

== Acting career ==
Beginning at age 17, Boutella rehearsed with famed Spanish choreographer Blanca Li. She began dancing in film and television shows, as well as in commercials and concert tours.

She played the lead character Eva in the drama film StreetDance 2 (2012), the sequel to StreetDance 3D (2010).

In 2014, after 12 years as a dancer, Boutella sought a career in acting. Initially, she purposefully avoided auditioning for lead roles, wishing to play supporting characters so as to learn from more experienced actors. In 2015, she appeared in her first major film, Kingsman: The Secret Service, which jump-started her career as an actress. One year later, she appeared as the alien warrior Jaylah in Star Trek Beyond, released on 22 July 2016.

In 2017, she portrayed a French secret agent in the David Leitch film Atomic Blonde, which also featured Charlize Theron, James McAvoy, John Goodman and Toby Jones. The same year, she played the titular character in The Mummy, along with Tom Cruise, Russell Crowe and Annabelle Wallis. Also that year, GQ called her "the best new action star of 2017" while Vanity Fair said she was "this season's breakout action star."

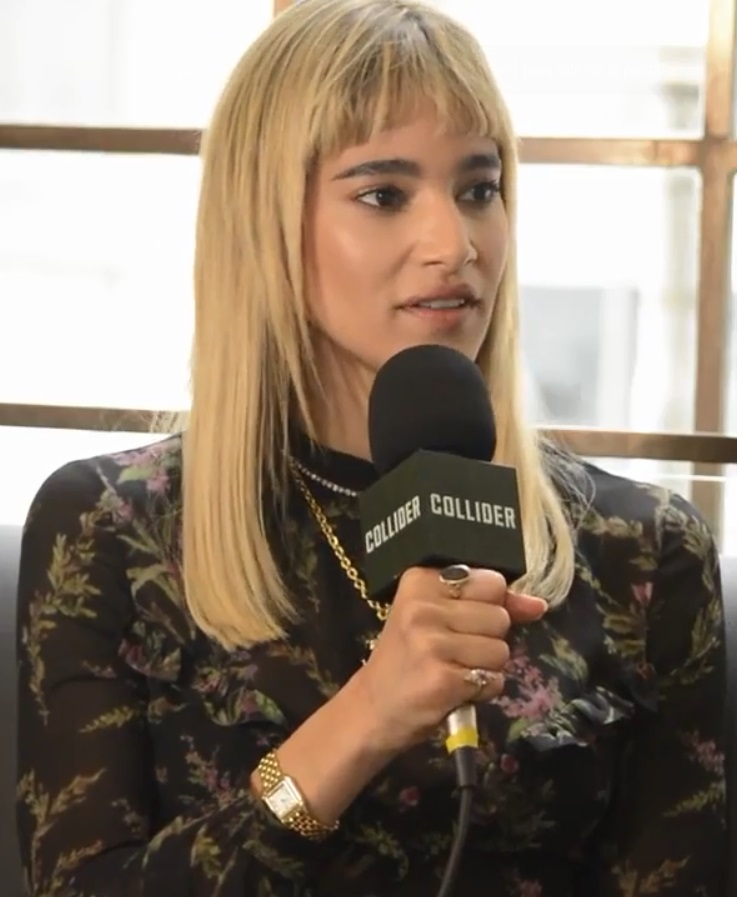
Boutella in 2018

Beginning in 2018, Boutella's profile rose, and she began to appear in more central roles. That year, she appeared in the Gaspar Noé dark psychological horror film Climax, starred alongside Michael B. Jordan and Michael Shannon in the HBO drama film Fahrenheit 451, and portrayed French contract killer 'Nice' in the near-future action crime thriller Hotel Artemis, alongside Jodie Foster, Jeff Goldblum, and Dave Bautista.

In October 2019, she starred in episode 5 of the first season of Amazon Prime's Modern Love.

In November 2021, Boutella was cast as the lead in the sci-fi adventure film Rebel Moon directed by Zack Snyder for Netflix.

Boutella played the fictional female Free French spy Eve Mansour in SAS: Rogue Heroes in 2022 and reprised the role for the second series released in 2025.

== Personal life ==
Although she has lived mostly in France since age 10, Boutella maintains strong ties to her Algerian roots and identity. In an interview she stated:

Algeria is a country that is dear to me, because it's where I'm from, where my family is from, it's my home. That will never leave me. I feel very worldly. But leaving a place like that when you're so young doesn't come without missing a sense of identity and belonging to one place. I think I've been blessed with the ability to travel, because I'm fearless to go anywhere, but I miss a sense of home, which was originally Algeria. But I feel Algerian, I'm proud to be Algerian and I carry that with me wherever I go.

From March 2014 until October 2018, Boutella was in a relationship with Irish actor Robert Sheehan.

== Filmography ==
=== Film ===
Year	Tile	Role	Notes	Reference
2002	Le Défi	Samia		
2005	Permis D'Aimer	Lila		
2006	Azur et Asmar	La Fée des elfes	Voice role	
2012	StreetDance 2	Eva		
2014	Monsters: Dark Continent	Ara		
2014	Kingsman: The Secret Service	Gazelle		
2016	Tiger Raid	Shadha		
2016	Star Trek: Beyond	Jaylah		
2016	Jet Trash	Vix		
2017	Atomic Blonde	Delphine Lasalle		
2017	The Mummy	Ahmanet		
2018	Hotel Artemis	Nice		
2018	Fahrenheit 451	Clarisse McClellan		
2018	Climax	Selva		
2021	Prisoners of the Ghostland	Bernice		
2021	Settlers	Ilsa		
2023	Rebel Moon – Part One: A Child of Fire	Kora / Arthelais		
2024	Argylle	Saba Al-Badr		
2024	Rebel Moon – Part Two: The Scargiver	Kora / Arthelais		
2024	The Killer's Game	Maize Arnaud		
2026	DreamQuil	Rebecca		
2026	Only What We Carry	Charlotte Levant		
2026	The Basics of Philosophy	Rebecca Richards	Post-production	
TBA	Tower Stories	TBA	Post-production	
TBA	Moral Capacity	Andrea	Post-production	
TBA	Yeti	TBA	Post-production	
TBA	Tangled Up in Blue	TBA	Post-production	

=== TV Series ===
Year	Title	Role	Notes	Reference
2004	Les Cordier, juge et flic	Maya	Episode: "Temps mort"	
2019	Modern Love	Yasmine	2 episodes	
2022	Guillermo del Toro's Cabinet of Curiosities	Dr. Zahra	1 episode	
2022–2025	SAS: Rogue Heroes	Eve Mansour	12 episodes	

=== Music videos ===
- Cesária Évora – "Nutridinha" (2001)
- Jamiroquai – "Little L" (2001)
- Matt Pokora – "Showbiz (The Battle)" (2004)
- BodyRockers – "I Like the Way (You Move)" (2005)
- Axwell – "Feel the Vibe ('Til the Morning Comes)" (2005)
- Madonna – "Hung Up" (2005)
- Madonna – "Sorry" (2006)
- Rihanna – "SOS (Nike Version)" (2006)
- Chris Brown – "Wall to Wall" (2007)
- Matt Pokora – "Dangerous" (2008)
- Madonna – "Celebration" (2009)
- Usher – "Hey Daddy (Daddy's Home)" (2009)
- Beat Freaks/Geminiz – "Jump II" (2010)
- Ne-Yo – "Beautiful Monster" (2010)
- Ne-Yo – "Champagne Life" (2010)
- Michael Jackson – "Hollywood Tonight" (2011)
- Take That – "Get Ready For It" (2015)
- Thirty Seconds to Mars – "Rescue Me" (2018)
- Madonna – "God Control" (2019)
- Foo Fighters – "Shame Shame" (2020)
- Silas Bassa – "Katia the runaway" (2020)
