= Crackanory =

- Genre: Comedy
- Directed by: Richie Pengelley
- Composer: Waen Shepherd
- Country of origin: United Kingdom
- Original language: English
- No. of series: 4
- No. of episodes: 26

Production
- Executive producer: Arnold Widdowson
- Running time: 30 minutes
- Production company: Tiger Aspect Productions

Original release
- Network: Dave
- Release: 13 November 2013 – 9 February 2017

Crackanory is a storytelling television series aimed at adults, inspired by the children's series Jackanory. It is broadcast on the UKTV channel Dave. Each episode features a tale narrated by a contemporary comedian or actor, using a mix of live action, original music and animation, all read from the same oversized chair in a set designed to reflect the story. The first series attracted critical acclaim and drew more than half a million viewers to Dave.

Recurring elements include the fictional company Tripec Plastics, the town of Specsham, and the character "Fat Nicola from accounts".

== First series ==
=== Episode 1 ===
- Jack Dee "Bitter Tweet" by Nico Tatarowicz
- Sally Phillips "What Peebee Did Next" by Toby Davies

=== Episode 2 ===
- Rebecca Front "Fakespeare" by Toby Davies
- Kevin Eldon "What Do You Say?" by Kevin Eldon

=== Episode 3 ===
- Harry Enfield "The Teacup Has Landed" by Nico Tatarowicz
- Sarah Solemani "Pleasure Drone" by Ali Crockatt and David Scott

=== Episode 4 ===
- Sharon Horgan "The Translator" by Laurence Rickard
- Charlie Higson "The Road to Hell" by Jeremy Dyson

=== Episode 5 ===
- Richard Hammond "Becoming Zoe" by Simon Judd and Alex Carter
- Jessica Hynes "My Former Self" by Holly Walsh

=== Episode 6 ===
- Hugh Dennis "Head In the Clouds" by Jason Cook
- Stephen Mangan "The Newsreader" by Jane Bussmann and Naisola Grimwood

Live action actors in the series include Alex Macqueen, Cariad Lloyd, Katherine Jakeways, James Bachman, Martha Howe-Douglas, Nick Mohammed, Vera Filatova, Cassie and Connie Powney

== Second series ==
A second series was broadcast in 2014 and featured comedian Rik Mayall, who had recorded a story prior to his death. (He had performed George's Marvelous Medicine by Roald Dahl on the original Jackanory.) Channel boss Steve North called it a "complete privilege" to work with Mayall.

=== Episode 1 ===
- Vic Reeves "In Space No-one Can Hear You Clean" by Nico Tatarowicz
- Rik Mayall "The Weatherman" by Tony Way

=== Episode 2 ===
- Ben Miller "Man's Best Friend" by Alexander Kirk
- Sue Perkins "Return to Sender" by Melissa Bubnic

=== Episode 3 ===
- David Mitchell "The Surprise" by Toby Davies
- Katherine Parkinson "The Crisis Plan" by Holly Walsh

=== Episode 4 ===
- Johnny Vegas "Self Storage" by Alexander Kirk
- Meera Syal "The Obituary Writer" by Katherine Jakeways, original story by David Crow and Oliver Maltman

=== Episode 5 ===
- Warwick Davis "The Untangler" by Toby Davies
- Emilia Fox "Murder He Wrote" by Nico Tatarowicz

=== Episode 6 ===
- Simon Callow "Let Me Be the Judge" by Kevin Eldon
- Ruby Wax "I'm Still Here" by Ali Crockatt and David Scott

Live action actors in the second series include Simon Farnaby, Rosie Cavaliero, Michael Fish, Alice Lowe, Elis James, Victoria Wicks, Lucy Montgomery, Dominic Coleman, Tom Meeten and Sara Pascoe.

== Third series ==
The third series, commissioned by UKTV, was broadcast in December 2015 and was sponsored by the Amazon-owned digital audio service Audible. The guest story readers for the six-part series include Christopher Lloyd, known for his roles in long-running sitcom Taxi and as Doc Brown in the Back to the Future trilogy.

=== Episode 1 ===
- Paul Whitehouse "Uncivil War" by Nico Tatarowicz
- Carrie Fisher "Dread and Breakfast" by Nico Tatarowicz

=== Episode 2 ===
- Catherine Tate "The Catchment Area" by Holly Walsh
- Richard Ayoade "The Frogbeast of Pontfidd" by Toby Davies

=== Episode 3 ===
- Jimmy Carr "The Zombie That Roared" by Alexander Kirk
- Christopher Lloyd "Di Sat Nav" by Melissa Bubnic

=== Episode 4 ===
- Robbie Coltrane "The Last Laugh" by Toby Davies
- Sarah Millican "Abbatnoir" by Dafydd James

=== Episode 5 ===
- Morgana Robinson "The Truth About Suz" by Edward Easton and Kiri Pritchard-McLean
- Greg Davies "The Vexed Message" by Tony Way

=== Episode 6 ===
- Simon Bird "Unlucky for Sam" by Kevin Eldon
- Tamsin Greig "Bob's House" by Holly Walsh

Live action actors in the third series include Janine Duvitski, Amy Hoggart, Ray Panthaki, Kerry Howard, Marcia Warren, Kerry Godliman and Steve Oram.

== Fourth series ==
The fourth series, also commissioned by UKTV, was broadcast in January and February 2017. Each half-hour episode contained one story rather than two.

"We are thrilled to be bringing back the award-winning Crackanory for a fourth time on Dave. It has become one of our landmark brands, and the ambitions of the show continue to grow with each new series. We're hugely excited to see the storytelling format evolve into a single narrative per episode, and to reveal the talented narrators who will be taking a seat in the iconic Crackanory chair."

=== Episode 1 ===
- Dara Ó Briain "A Close Slave" by Tony Way

=== Episode 2 ===
- Sheridan Smith "Living with a Lie" by Nico Tatarowicz

=== Episode 3 ===
- Bob Mortimer "The Despot of Tea" by Arnold Widdowson

=== Episode 4 ===
- Anna Friel "The Survivor" by Alexander Kirk

=== Episode 5 ===
- Mel Giedroyc "Proxy Lady" by Katherine Jakeways

=== Episode 6 ===
- Doc Brown, "Devil's Haircut" by Sarah Morgan

=== Episode 7 ===
- Mackenzie Crook, "The Disappearance" by Toby Davies

=== Episode 8 ===
- Miriam Margolyes, "Pickled" by Kevin Eldon

Live action actors in the fourth series include Moya Brady, Tom Bennett, Neil Bell, Matthew Steer, Sophia Di Martino and David Gant.
