= Julian Lewis Jones =

Welsh actor

- Born: Anglesey, Wales
- Other name: Julian Jones
- Occupation: Actor
- Years active: 1994–present

Julian Lewis Jones is a Welsh actor. He is best known for his roles in the films Invictus (2009) and Justice League (2017).

== Career ==
Originally from Anglesey, Jones lives in Nantgaredig. A fluent Welsh speaker, he has appeared on various productions on the Welsh-language channel S4C, including as a presenter of a popular fishing programme Sgota.

In 2010, he appeared in an episode of the TV series The Tudors. Also in 2010 he appeared on British TV series Spooks (US title MI-5) as Russian spy Viktor Barenshik in Season 9, Episode 3. From 2012 to 2016 he appeared in the Sky One drama-comedy series Stella as Karl Morris, and in an episode of the BBC Two drama-comedy series Ambassadors in 2012. In 2012, he played a CIA operative in the Kathryn Bigelow film Zero Dark Thirty.

Jones portrayed Atlan, King of Atlantis, in the superhero film Justice League (2017) and the director's cut Zack Snyder's Justice League (2021).

In April 2022, it was announced that he had been cast as Bayle Domon in the second season of The Wheel of Time. The same year, Jones appeared as Boremund Baratheon in the HBO series House of the Dragon.

In 2024, it was announced that Jones had been cast in the four-part BBC One thriller The Guest. He will also appear in the upcoming Sky television series Under Salt Marsh.

== Political views ==
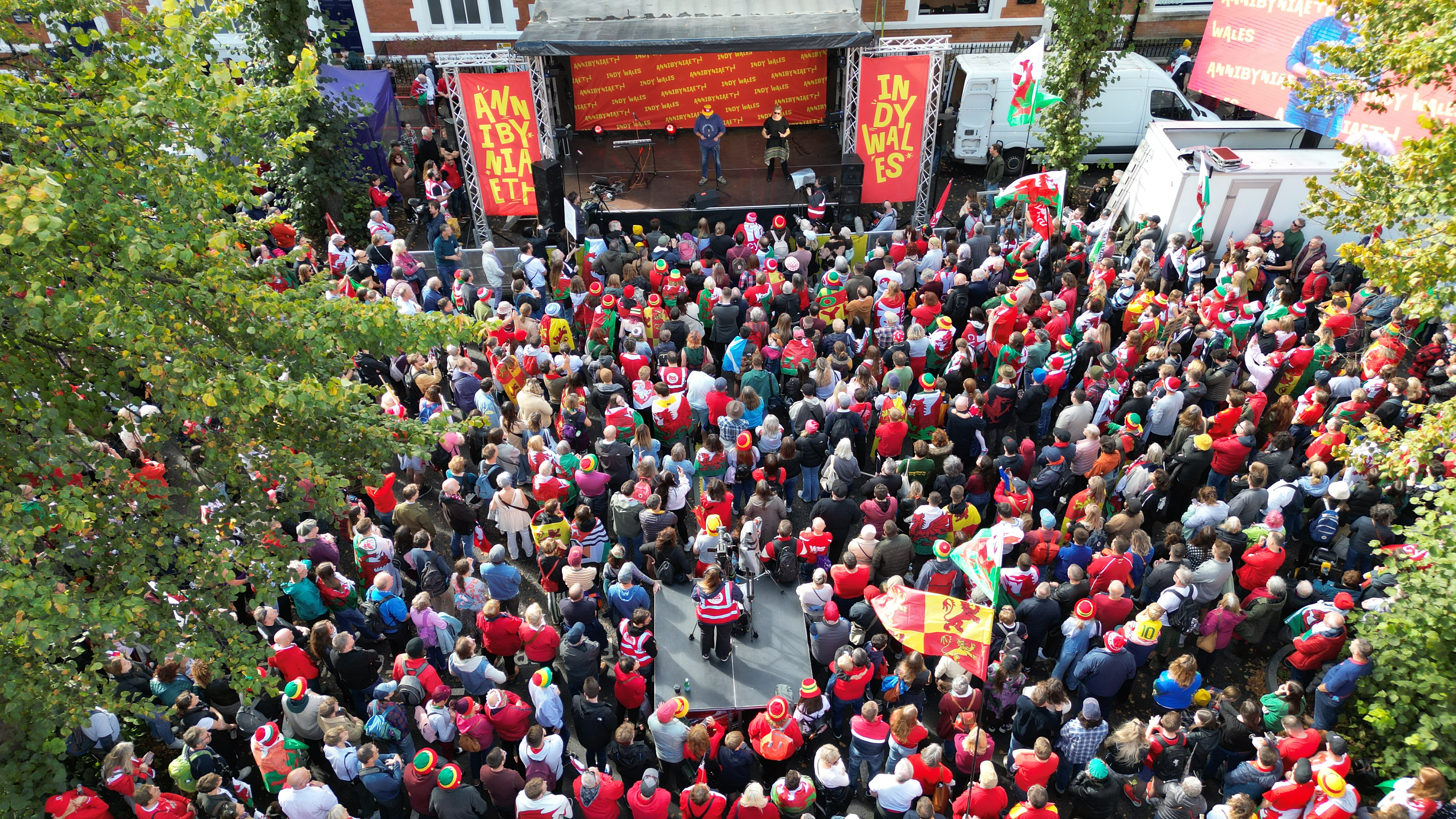
Lewis Jones speaking at the march for Welsh independence in Cardiff in 2022.

In January 2018, Jones called for more investment in local Welsh film and television projects. The same year, Jones addressed the Culture, Welsh Language and Communications Committee to reiterate that call. Jones is a supporter of Welsh independence, joining YesCymru in June 2020.

== Filmography ==
=== Film ===
Year	Title	Character	Notes
1999	Solomon & Gaenor	Wyn	
2001	Arthur's Dyke	Stubble Face	
2003	I'll Be There	Paramedic	
2008	The Bank Job	Snow	
2009	Invictus	Etienne Feyder	
2011	The Eagle	Cassius	
2012	Zero Dark Thirty	Blackwater Guard	
2016	The Head Hunter	Bill	
2017	Justice League	Ancient Atlantean King	
2019	Mr. Jones	Major Edgar Jones	Father of title character
2021	Zack Snyder's Justice League	Ancient Atlantean King	
2021	The Feast	Gwyn	
2021	Love Spreads	Jamie	Set at Rockfield Studios
2022	Jungle Cry	Dale Bright	South Africa coach
2025	On the Sea	William	
2026	Madfabulous	Viscount of Gwynedd	
2026	Black Church Bay	Maclean	
TBA	Tangled Up in Blue	TBA	Post-production

=== TV ===
Year	Title	Character	Production	Notes
1995	Soldier Soldier	Corporal Jimmy Flack	ITV	Season 5, Episode 11 "hard Lessons"
1995 - 2013	Casualty	Terry Marshall, Rob Batchelor, Tony Moss	BBC	S10 E11 "Release" (1995), S22 E24 "Before a Fall" (2008), S28 E18 "Away in a Manger" (2013)
2001	The Bench	Mike Morris	BBC One	Episodes #1.1, #1.2, #1.4, #1.5
2002–2005	Where The Heart Is	Tom Beresford	ITV	Series 6 to 9
2004	Holby City	Stuart Miller	BBC One	S6 E45 "One More Chance"
2008	Torchwood	Alex Hopkins	BBC	Series 2, episode 12 – "Fragments"
2010	The Tudors	Richard Roper	Showtime	Season 4, episode 1
2012–2016	Stella	Karl Morris	Sky 1	Series 1–5 (2012-2016), 36 Episodes
2013	The Bible	Angel of the Lord	History Channel	Episode 3 "Homeland"
2013	Ambassadors	Mike Treasure	BBC Two	Episode 2
2013	Life of Crime	Michael Holland	ITV	Episodes 1-3
2014	The Assets	Jim	ABC	Season 1, episodes 7–8
2015	Foyle's War	James Stafford	ITV	Series 8, episode 3
2015	River	Jordy Merton	BBC One	Episode #1.3
2016	Hinterland	Lewis John	BBC Four	Episode #3.2
2019	Midsomer Murders	Guy Bevan	ITV	Season 20, Episode 4 "The Lions of Causton"
2022	The Tuckers	Bailiff	BBC One	Season 2, episodes 4
2022	House of the Dragon	Boremund Baratheon	HBO	Episodes: "The Heirs of the Dragon" and "King of the Narrow Sea"
2023	Wheel of Time	Bayle Domon	Amazon	Season 2
2024	Call the Midwife	Mr. Norton	BBC One	Season 13, Episode 5
2025	The Guest	Simon Sharp	BBC One	Drama series
2025	Dope Girls	John Campbell	BBC One	Episodes 2, 3 & 4
2026	Under Salt Marsh	Osian Northam	Sky Atlantic	Drama series, Episodes 1-6

=== Video Games ===
Year	Title	Role	Notes
2020	Assassin's Creed Valhalla	Briton Soldier (voice)	Published by Ubisoft
