= Black Mountain Poets (film) =

2015 British romantic comedy film

- Directed by: Jamie Adams
- Screenplay by: Jamie Adams
- Produced by: Jamie Adams; Jon Rennie
- Starring: Alice Lowe; Dolly Wells; Tom Cullen
- Cinematography: Ryan Eddleston
- Edited by: Mike Hopkins
- Music by: Helen Nash
- Distributed by: Jolene Films
- Release dates: June 2015 (Edinburgh International Film Festival); 1 April 2016
- Running time: 85 minutes
- Country: United Kingdom
- Language: English

Black Mountain Poets is a 2015 British comedy film directed by Jamie Adams and starring Alice Lowe, Dolly Wells and Tom Cullen. Largely improvised from Adams’ scriptment, the film was nominated for the 2016 Discovery Award at the British Independent Film Awards and won the Critics’ Jury Award at the Edinburgh International Film Festival.

== Synopsis ==
Two sisters on-the-run for petty crimes hide out at a poetry retreat in the Black Mountains, Wales, impersonating the world renowned poets whose car they stole.

== Cast ==
- Alice Lowe as Lisa Walker
- Dolly Wells as Clare Walker
- Tom Cullen as Richard
- Rosa Robson as Louise Cabaye
- Richard Elis as Gareth
- Laura Patch as Stacey
- Hannah Daniel as Alys Wilding
- Claire Cage as Terri Wilding

== Production ==
The film marked the third in a trilogy of films by Newport Film School graduate Jamie Adams about modern love, after 2014’s Benny & Jolene and A Wonderful Christmas Time. The film was shot in five days on location in the Welsh Black Mountains.

== Release ==
The film had its world premiere at the Edinburgh International Film Festival in 2015. It received its North American Premiere in the Visions section at the 2016 SXSW Film & Music Festival in Austin, Texas. The film had a limited UK cinema release in April 2016. Black Mountain Poets was distributed by Metrodome and picked up BFI Player, FILM4 and Amazon Prime.

== Reception ==
Kevin Maher gave the picture four out of five stars in The Times he said the film was "...in its own way, quietly brilliant..." noting the film has a third act of "...genuine literary power... it says that art is in the effort...pure poetry." Peter Bradshaw in The Guardian said the film was “...funny…very silly and likeable” noting that “there are some big laughs, particularly from Alice Lowe” but with little “narrative plausibility”. Guy Lodge in Variety said: “Alice Lowe and Dolly Wells are a riot” and described a “deftly escalated farce as humane as it is hilarious”. Neil Young in the Hollywood Reporter praises cinematographer Ryan Owen Eddleston‘s demonstrations of the “alluringly elemental Welsh countryside” and praises the performances of Lowe and Wells but feels the film underuses Hannah Daniel and Clare Cage who “are consistently hilarious in their fleeting, intermittent appearances as the bemused, bohemian-bard [Wilding] babes. David Jenkins in Little White Lies praised Lowe, saying: “Watching this film is a simple case of waiting for Alice Lowe to appear on screen. If everyone in the cast gives a solid seven out of 10, she’s easily a 12. The camera naturally gravitates towards her, wise to the fact that her reaction to a line of dialogue will likely be funnier than the dialogue itself. She’s hilarious, casually outclassing her fellow players. Even the way she wears a hat is amusing.”
