= Bittersweet Symphony (film) =

2019 American-British drama film by Jamie Adams

- Film poster
- Directed by: Jamie Adams
- Written by: Jamie Adams
- Produced by: Jamie Adams; Richard Elis; Maggie Monteith
- Starring: Suki Waterhouse; Jennifer Grey; Poppy Delevingne; Craig Roberts; Griffin Dunne
- Cinematography: Ryan Eddleston
- Edited by: Mike Hopkins
- Music by: Walter Mair
- Production companies: Dignity Film Finance; Talland Films; Twenty Dollar Pictures
- Distributed by: Gravitas Ventures; Pinpoint
- Release dates: 25 June 2019 (United States); 28 June 2019 (United Kingdom)
- Running time: 80 minutes
- Countries: United States; United Kingdom
- Language: English

Bittersweet Symphony is a 2019 American-British movie, written and directed by Jamie Adams. It stars Suki Waterhouse, Jennifer Grey, Poppy Delevingne, Craig Roberts and Griffin Dunne. Iris Evans (Suki Waterhouse) stars as a musician who has just completed her first soundtrack to a Hollywood feature and who finds her personal life getting complicated.

It was released in the United States on 25 June 2019, by Gravitas Ventures, and in the United Kingdom on 28 June 2019, by Pinpoint.

== Cast ==
- Suki Waterhouse as Iris Evans
- Jennifer Grey as Eleanor Roberts
- Poppy Delevingne as Abigail
- Craig Roberts as Bobby Purser
- Griffin Dunne as Griffin
- Richard Elis as Uncle Keith
- Keiron Self as Leonard

== Production ==
In November 2017, it was announced Suki Waterhouse, Jennifer Grey, Poppy Delevingne, Craig Roberts, Richard Elis and Griffin Dunne had joined the cast of the film, with Jamie Adams directing from a screenplay he wrote.

== Release ==
The film Premiered at the Edinburgh International Film Festival in June 2019. The film was released in the United States on 25 June 2019, by Gravitas Ventures, and in the United Kingdom on 28 June 2019, by Pinpoint.
