= Love Spreads (film) =

- Directed by: Jamie Adams
- Written by: Jamie Adams
- Produced by: Jamie Adams; Maggie Monteith
- Starring: Alia Shawkat; Eiza González; Chanel Cresswell; Nick Helm; Dolly Wells; Tara Lee
- Cinematography: Ryan Eddleston
- Edited by: Mike Hopkins
- Production companies: Dignity Film Finance; Film Shed
- Distributed by: Gravitas Ventures (United States); Sparky Pictures (United Kingdom)
- Release date: June 13, 2021 (Tribeca)
- Running time: 93 minutes
- Countries: United States; United Kingdom
- Language: English

Love Spreads is a 2021 American-British comedy film written, directed, and produced by Jamie Adams. It stars Alia Shawkat, Eiza González, Chanel Cresswell, Nick Helm, Dolly Wells and Tara Lee.

The film premiered at the 2021 Tribeca Film Festival. It was previously scheduled to premier at the previous year's festival, however, the festival was cancelled due to the COVID-19 pandemic.

== Cast ==
- Alia Shawkat as Kelly
- Eiza González as Patricia
- Chanel Cresswell as Jess
- Nick Helm as Mark
- Dolly Wells as Julie
- Tara Lee as Alice
- Julian Lewis Jones as Jamie
