= Tom Cullen =

British actor

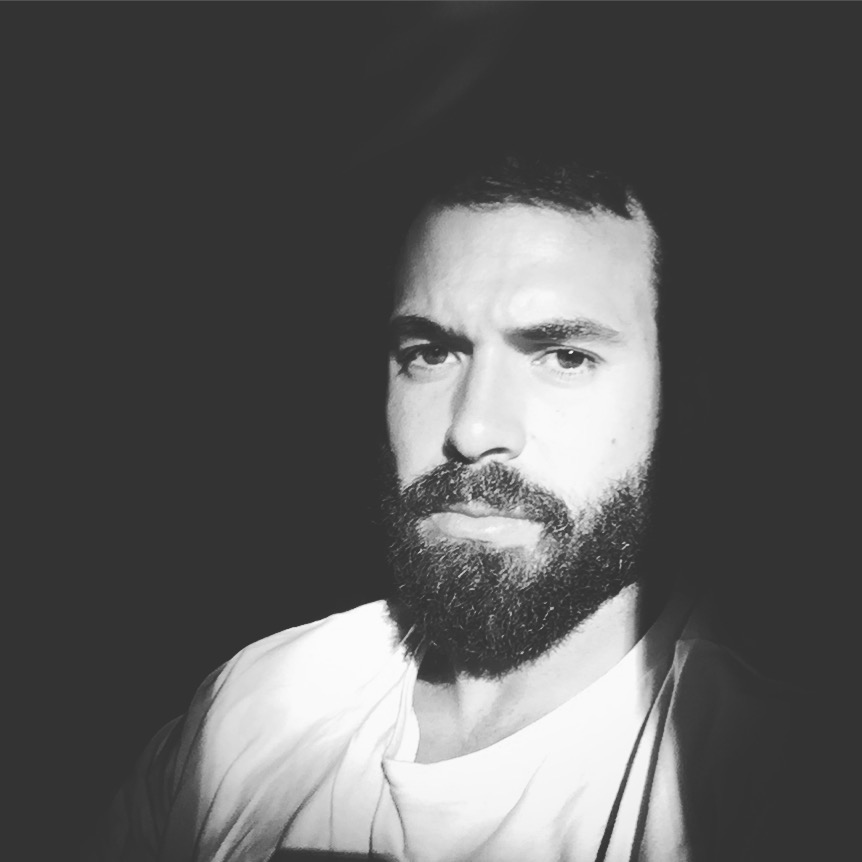
- Cullen in 2016
- Born: Thomas Cullen; 17 July 1985 (age 41); Aberystwyth, Dyfed, Wales
- Education: Royal Welsh College of Music & Drama
- Occupations: Actor; writer; director
- Years active: 2006–present

Thomas Cullen (born 17 July 1985) is a Welsh actor and director. He had roles in the independent film Weekend (2011), as Anthony Foyle, Viscount Gillingham in the television series Downton Abbey (2013-14), Sir Landry in the historical drama series Knightfall (2017-19), John Palmer in the BBC crime drama series The Gold (2023-25), and Ser Luthor Largent in the HBO fantasy drama series House of the Dragon (2026). He also played Thomas Seymour in Becoming Elizabeth.

== Early life and education ==
Thomas Cullen was born on 17 July 1985 in Aberystwyth, Wales, the son of two writers. His father is Irish and his mother English. He has two siblings. He spent his early years in Llandrindod Wells and moved to Cardiff at age 12, where he attended Llanishen High School.

Before pursuing an acting career, Cullen was involved in music. He graduated from the Royal Welsh College of Music and Drama in 2009 with a First Class Honours degree in acting, after spending a year at the Central School of Speech and Drama in London.

== Career ==
=== Acting ===
Whilst still in training, Cullen was taken out of the Royal Welsh College of Music and Drama to appear in Daddy's Girl, which won the BAFTA Cymru for Best Film, and to star in Watch Me, which won the BAFTA Cymru for Best Short. His stage roles include Gorgio at the Bristol Old Vic, Assembly and A Good Night Out in the Valleys at National Theatre Wales, and The Sanger at Sherman Cymru. In 2011, he was named on the Screen International Stars of Tomorrow list.

Cullen starred in the 2011 film Weekend as Russell, a Nottingham lifeguard. Weekend collected numerous awards including the Grand Jury award at the Nashville Film Festival and Best Achievement in Production at the British Independent Film Awards. Cullen won Most Promising Newcomer at the British Independent Film Awards and Best Actor at the Nashville Film Festival in 2011 for his role as Russell. His television roles include Jonas in Black Mirror. He starred as Wulfric in the 2012 miniseries World Without End. He had a recurring role as Mary Crawley's suitor Anthony Foyle (the Viscount Gillingham) in Downton Abbey.

He appeared in the films Desert Dancer, the story of Iranian dancer Afshin Ghaffarian, who risked his life to become a dancer despite a nationwide dancing ban, and the science fiction The Last Days on Mars, based around the first crewed mission to Mars.

Cullen played Joe Rose in the three-part ITV drama The Trials of Jimmy Rose, that aired in September 2015. He starred in a Canadian indie from production company Motel Pictures, The Other Half. He played the lead role of Mark in Harlan Coben's 2015 series The Five, a ten-part Sky 1 mystery series. He also starred as Landry in the History series Knightfall, which started in December 2017. Cullen played Guy Fawkes alongside Kit Harington and Liv Tyler in Gunpowder on BBC One.

Cullen's editorial work includes L'Uomo Vogue, Vogue Italia, Vanity Fair, and 10 Magazine.

=== Writing ===
In 2008, Cullen wrote and produced the short film Naughties with Alexander Vlahos. In 2009, he and Vlahos co-founded the Welsh company Undeb Theatre. He wrote and directed his full-length play, Kingfisher, about a man returning from prison, in 2010, as well as other short plays performed by Undeb.

=== Directing ===
Cullen made his directorial debut with the 2019 film Pink Wall starring Tatiana Maslany and Jay Duplass. The film is described by Screen Daily as "the story of a couple’s struggles with the pressures of gender expectations and the conflict between life and ambition".

== Filmography ==
=== Film ===
| Year | Title | Role | Notes |
|---|---|---|---|
| 2006 | Daddy's Girl | Boy (Jason) | U.S. title: Cravings |
| 2008 | Watch Me | Tom | Short film Nominated for BAFTA Cymru Best Short Film |
| 2009 | Twenty Questions | Adam | Short film |
| 2010 | Balance | Nico | Short film |
| 2011 | Weekend | Russell | British Independent Film Award for Best Newcomer |
| 2012 | Henry | Henry | Short film |
| 2013 | Room 8 | Ives | Short film BAFTA Award for Best British Short Film |
| 2013 | The Last Days on Mars | Richard Harrington | |
| 2014 | Desert Dancer | Ardavan | |
| 2015 | Black Mountain Poets | Richard | |
| 2015 | The Batsman and the Ballerina | Simon | Short film |
| 2016 | The Other Half | Nickie | Also executive producer |
| 2016 | Happily Ever After | Colin | |
| 2016 | 100 Streets | Jake | |
| 2016 | Mine | Tommy Madison | |
| 2016 | Trial | Ryan / New Aaron | Short film |
| 2018 | Souls of Totality | Guy 3 | Short film |
| 2019 | Pink Wall | Chris | Also writer, director and co-producer |
| 2019 | Castle in the Ground | Jimmy | |
| 2021 | Zebra Girl | Dan | |
| 2021 | My Son | Frank | |
| 2021 | Barbarians | Lucas | |
| 2023 | My Happy Ending | Dr. Hanson | |
| 2026 | Black Church Bay | Barry | |
| TBA | Walk the Blue Fields | TBA | Filming |

=== Television ===
| Year | Title | Role | Notes |
|---|---|---|---|
| 2010 | Pen Talar | Richard | Episodes 7 & 8 |
| 2010 | Banged Up Abroad | Yoram | Series 5; 1 episode |
| 2011 | Black Mirror | Jonas | Series 1; episode 3: "The Entire History of You" |
| 2012 | World Without End | Wulfric | Mini-series; episodes 1–8 |
| 2013–2014 | Downton Abbey | Anthony Gillingham | Series 4 & 5; 12 episodes |
| 2015 | The Trials of Jimmy Rose | Joe Rose | Mini-series; episodes 1–3 |
| 2016 | The Five | Mark Wells | Mini-series; episodes 1–10 |
| 2017 | Orphan Black | Leonard Sipp | Season 5; episode 6: "Manacled Slim Wrists" |
| 2017 | Gunpowder | Guy Fawkes | Mini-series; episodes 1–3 |
| 2017–2019 | Knightfall | Landry du Lauzon | Lead role. Seasons 1 & 2; 18 episodes |
| 2018 | Genius | Luc Simon | Season 2; episodes 6 & 10: "Picasso: Chapters Six and Ten" |
| 2021 | Invasion | Mr. Edwards | Season 1; episodes 2–4 |
| 2022 | Becoming Elizabeth | Thomas Seymour | Episodes 1–6 & 8 |
| 2023–2025 | The Gold | John Palmer | Series 1 & 2; 12 episodes |
| 2024 | The Way | Jack Price MP | Episode 1: "The War" |
| 2024 | Insomnia | Robert Averill | Episodes 1–6 |
| 2025 | Mudtown | Peter Burton | Main cast |
| 2025 | Trespasses | Michael Agnew | Main cast |
| 2026 | House of the Dragon | Luthor Largent | 4 episodes |
| 2026 | The Party | Benjamin Fitzmaurice | Main cast |
| TBA | Life Is Strange | Mark Jefferson | Main cast |

== Awards and nominations ==
| Year | Award | Category | Work | Result |
|---|---|---|---|---|
| 2011 | London Film Critics Circle Awards | British Actor of the Year | Weekend | Nominated |
| 2011 | BFI London Film Festival | Best British Newcomer | Weekend | Nominated |
| 2011 | Nashville Film Festival | Best Actor in a Narrative Feature | Weekend | Won |
| 2011 | British Independent Film Award | Most Promising Newcomer | Weekend | Won |
| 2016 | Screen Actors Guild Award | Outstanding Performance by an Ensemble in a Drama Series | Downton Abbey | Won |
