= Soulmates (TV series) =

2020 American miniseries

- Genre: Anthology
- Created by: William Bridges; Brett Goldstein
- Starring: Sarah Snook; Kingsley Ben-Adir; Dolly Wells; Darren Boyd
- Country of origin: United States
- Original language: English
- No. of seasons: 1
- No. of episodes: 6

Production
- Executive producers: William Bridges; Brett Goldstein; Jolyon Symonds
- Production company: Fearless Minds

Original release
- Network: AMC
- Release: October 5 – November 9, 2020

Soulmates is an American science fiction anthology television series created by William Bridges and Brett Goldstein. Soulmates premiered on AMC on October 5, 2020. Despite being renewed for a second season in August 2020, ahead of its premiere, the series was cancelled in 2022.

The 2024 film All of You takes place in the same fictional universe.

== Premise ==
Soulmates is set approximately 15 years in the future, when a company called Soul Connex has developed a test that can determine the person you were most meant to love with 100% accuracy. People who take the test either learn of their soulmate and have the choice to pursue that person, or get a response of, "Your soulmate hasn't tested yet." The series explores through self-contained episodes whether love is destiny or a choice. Says series co-creator Will Bridges, "Your soulmate is the person you will love the most, more than anyone else. A soulmate isn't someone who is going to fix you. It's the person you will feel love for the strongest, and it’s undeniable. Does that mean true happiness, or the best person for you?"

== Cast ==
- Sarah Snook as Nikki (episode 1)
- Kingsley Ben-Adir as Franklin (episode 1)
- Dolly Wells as Jennifer (episode 1)
- Anna Wilson-Jones as Rose (episode 1)
- Emily Bevan as Adele (episode 1)
- Darren Boyd as Peter (episode 1)
- David Costabile as David Maddox (episode 2)
- Karima McAdams as Sarah Maddox (episode 2)
- Sonya Cassidy as Allison Jones (episode 2)
- Henry Goodman as Walter Gaskell (episode 2)
- Laia Costa as Libby (episode 3)
- Georgina Campbell as Miranda (episode 3)
- Emily Bruni as Co-worker (episode 3)
- Shamier Anderson as Adam (episode 3)
- Bill Skarsgård as Mateo (episode 4)
- Nathan Stewart-Jarrett as Jonah (episode 4)
- Fátima Molina as Natalia (episode 4)
- Malin Åkerman as Martha (episode 5)
- Charlie Heaton as Kurt Shepard (episode 5)
- Charlotte Spencer as Heather (episode 5)
- Joe Anderson as Travis (episode 5)
- Steven Mackintosh as Brother Samson (episode 5)
- Betsy Brandt as Caitlin Jones (episode 6)
- JJ Feild as Nathan (episode 6)
- Tom Goodman-Hill as Doug (episode 6)

== Episodes ==
No.	Title	Directed by	Written by	Original release date	U.S. viewers (millions)
1	"Watershed"	Rob Savage	Brett Goldstein & William Bridges	October 5, 2020	0.245
After seeing her brother, Peter, and friend, Jennifer, successfully find soulmates using the Soul Connex technology, Nikki secretly takes the Soul Connex test without telling her husband, Franklin. Concerned that he is losing Nikki after she reveals the truth, Franklin announces he's taken the test and wants to be with his soulmate match, just as Nikki had decided to give their marriage one more try.
2	"The Lovers"	Rob Savage	William Bridges & Brett Goldstein	October 12, 2020	0.259
College professor David Maddox is confronted on campus by Allison, a woman who shows him test results revealing they are a soulmate match, even though he chose to have his test results blocked. Allison reveals she hacked Soul Connex to find her match, and continues to pursue David despite his assurances that he loves his wife, who is also his boss's daughter. David ultimately gives into temptation and sleeps with Allison, only to discover she's hiding a more sinister motive.
3	"Little Adventures"	Marco Kreuzpaintner	Jessica Knappett and Brett Goldstein & William Bridges	October 19, 2020	0.164
Adam and Libby are a happily married couple with a semi-open relationship. They allow each other sexual liaisons, but only via a traditional hookup app. Adam is disappointed to learn that Libby took the Soul Connex test years ago when the two were on a break, and has now received a soulmate match. Libby and her soulmate Miranda are both surprised that they were matched with another woman, but still find themselves attracted to each other. A few months into the relationship, Miranda learns that meeting her soulmate didn't fix her commitment issues, while Libby longs for the nurturing only Adam could provide. As Libby returns to see Adam, he informs her that his soulmate, Tyra, will be arriving from England. Tyra arrives to find Adam, Libby and Miranda together, explaining that each one needs the other two for different reasons. Tyra, slightly overwhelmed, doesn't voice immediate commitments but agrees to have coffee with the three.
4	"Layover"	Marco Kreuzpaintner	Evan Placey	October 26, 2020	0.176
Mateo has a layover in Mexico for an evening on his way to meet his soulmate match, Miguel, in Colombia. Mateo meets Jonah in a bar, has a sexual encounter with him, and later discovers his passport missing. After Mateo learns he needs $3,000 to get his passport back, he and Jonah embark on a wild night of thievery, gambling and infiltrating a criminal organization. Mateo ultimately retrieves his passport, but is conflicted about leaving Jonah behind. Jonah encourages him to meet his soulmate, and Mateo leaves for the airport. Later, Jonah is flirting with another man in the bar, when he is surprised to see Mateo has returned after skipping his flight.
5	"Break on Through"	Andrea Harkin	Melissa Stephens and Brett Goldstein & William Bridges	November 2, 2020	0.183
Kurt is attending a grief counseling session with other people whose soulmate matches died before they could meet. After the meeting, he bonds with Martha, an older woman from the group, and the two share a sexual encounter. As Martha walks away, Kurt apologizes out loud to Heather, his deceased soulmate match. Kurt then joins a cult that promises to unite people with their late soulmate matches in the afterlife, via assisted suicide, and he is surprised to see Martha there. After initially agreeing to be "death buddies", the two decide at the last minute that they want to live.
6	"The (Power) Ballad of Caitlin Jones"	William Bridges	William Bridges & Brett Goldstein	November 9, 2020	0.163
After Caitlin meets Nathan, her soulmate match, she throws out her slacker boyfriend Doug. Even though Caitlin and Doug had agreed that their relationship would end if either received a soulmate match, Doug is not pleased with being forced to move out and does all he can to stay. Later, Nathan calls and invites Caitlin to his house, where she arrives and witnesses him killing another woman. Nathan assumes that Caitlin was matched to him because she has the same tendencies, but Caitlin is shocked and wants to end their relationship. However, Caitlin slowly begins to discover feelings that have been long suppressed. The episode closes with her talking to a different man in a bar, stating that while she is no longer with her soulmate, she credits him for helping her see who she really is.
