= Doll & Em =

2014 British comedy TV series

- Genre: Comedy
- Created by: Emily Mortimer; Dolly Wells
- Written by: Emily Mortimer; Dolly Wells; Azazel Jacobs
- Directed by: Azazel Jacobs
- Starring: Emily Mortimer; Dolly Wells
- Composer: Mandy Hoffman
- Country of origin: United Kingdom
- Original language: English
- No. of series: 2
- No. of episodes: 12

Production
- Executive producers: Andrew Eaton; Lucy Lumsden
- Producer: Alessandro Nivola
- Camera setup: Single-camera
- Running time: 22 minutes
- Production company: King Bee Productions

Original release
- Network: Sky Living (series 1); Sky Atlantic (series 2)
- Release: 18 February 2014 – 8 July 2015

Doll & Em is a British comedy television series created by and starring Emily Mortimer and Dolly Wells. A six-episode order was commissioned by Sky Living in 2013. The series was directed and co-written by Azazel Jacobs. A 124-minute theatrical cut of the series was shown at the London Film Festival, premiering 10 October 2013. Sky Living premiered Doll & Em on 18 February 2014. The American cable network HBO acquired the series in September 2013, and premiered it on 19 March 2014.

On 16 October 2014, Sky Living renewed the show for a second series, which started broadcasting on 3 June 2015 on Sky Atlantic in the UK.

== Plot ==
The show is about a successful British actress, Em, and her best friend, Doll, as they navigate their friendship once Em hires Doll to be her assistant. It also explores the characters' roles in the entertainment industry. Additionally, the plot concerns the making of Em's new movie.

== Cast ==
- Emily Mortimer as Em, an actress starring in a new film to be filmed in Los Angeles
- Dolly Wells as Doll, Em's best friend and her new personal assistant
- Jonathan Cake as Buddy, a producer
- Aaron Himelstein as Mike, the director of Em's film

== Episodes ==
=== Series 1 (2014) ===
No.	Title	Directed by	Written by	Original release date
1	"Episode 1"	Azazel Jacobs	Emily Mortimer, Dolly Wells & Azazel Jacobs	18 February 2014
2	"Episode 2"	Azazel Jacobs	Emily Mortimer, Dolly Wells & Azazel Jacobs	25 February 2014
3	"Episode 3"	Azazel Jacobs	Emily Mortimer, Dolly Wells & Azazel Jacobs	4 March 2014
4	"Episode 4"	Azazel Jacobs	Emily Mortimer, Dolly Wells & Azazel Jacobs	11 March 2014
5	"Episode 5"	Azazel Jacobs	Emily Mortimer, Dolly Wells & Azazel Jacobs	18 March 2014
6	"Episode 6"	Azazel Jacobs	Emily Mortimer, Dolly Wells & Azazel Jacobs	25 March 2014

=== Series 2 (2015) ===
No.	Title	Directed by	Written by	Original release date
1	"Episode 7"	Azazel Jacobs	Story by : Emily Mortimer, Dolly Wells & Azazel Jacobs; Teleplay by : Emily Mortimer & Dolly Wells	3 June 2015
2	"Episode 8"	Azazel Jacobs	Story by : Emily Mortimer, Dolly Wells & Azazel Jacobs; Teleplay by : Emily Mortimer & Dolly Wells	10 June 2015
3	"Episode 9"	Azazel Jacobs	Story by : Emily Mortimer, Dolly Wells & Azazel Jacobs; Teleplay by : Emily Mortimer & Dolly Wells	17 June 2015
4	"Episode 10"	Azazel Jacobs	Story by : Emily Mortimer, Dolly Wells & Azazel Jacobs; Teleplay by : Emily Mortimer & Dolly Wells	24 June 2015
5	"Episode 11"	Azazel Jacobs	Story by : Emily Mortimer, Dolly Wells & Azazel Jacobs; Teleplay by : Emily Mortimer & Dolly Wells	1 July 2015
6	"Episode 12"	Azazel Jacobs	Story by : Emily Mortimer, Dolly Wells & Azazel Jacobs; Teleplay by : Emily Mortimer & Dolly Wells	8 July 2015
