= Only What We Carry =

Upcoming drama film by Jamie Adams

- Directed by: Jamie Adams
- Written by: Jamie Adams
- Produced by: Charles Benoin; Liam Hellmann; Jouri Smit
- Starring: Simon Pegg; Sofia Boutella; Charlotte Gainsbourg; Quentin Tarantino; Liam Hellmann; Lizzy McAlpine
- Cinematography: Neema Sadeghi
- Edited by: Cecile Laperge
- Music by: Chris Hyson; Julien Durand
- Production companies: Atlas Pictures; Easy on the Eye
- Release date: 6 June 2026 (Tribeca Festival)
- Running time: 93 minutes
- Countries: United Kingdom; France
- Language: English

Only What We Carry is a 2026 drama film written and directed by Jamie Adams. It stars Simon Pegg, Sofia Boutella, Charlotte Gainsbourg, Quentin Tarantino, Liam Hellmann, and Lizzy McAlpine.

The film premiered at the Tribeca Festival on 6 June 2026.

== Premise ==
Charlotte Levant returns home where she reconnects with her former instructor Julian Johns. However, when John Percy, Julian's old friend, suddenly arrives, long-buried truths are resurfaced.

== Cast ==
- Simon Pegg as Julian Johns
- Sofia Boutella as Charlotte Levant
- Charlotte Gainsbourg as Josephine Chabrol
- Quentin Tarantino as John Percy
- Liam Hellmann as Vincent
- Lizzy McAlpine as Jacqueline

== Production ==
The film was directed by Jamie Adams and produced by Charles Benoin, Liam Hellmann, and Jouri Smit. The film is set and was filmed in Deauville, France with principal photography wrapped by October 2025. Filming occurred in 6 days.

== Release ==
Only What We Carry premiered at the Tribeca Festival on 6 June 2026.
