= Tara Lee =

Irish actress and singer

Tara Lisa McKeon
- Born: November 8, 1994 (age 30); Dublin, Ireland
- Occupations: Actress; singer
- Years active: 2004–present

Tara Lee (born Tara Lisa McKeon) is an Irish actress, singer and songwriter. She is signed to BMG Chrysalis and released her debut album, Noir, in 2019. As an actress, Lee has worked in both film and television, and is best known for recurring roles in the British crime drama series Shetland, The Fall and The Suspect. In 2018, Lee appeared in EastEnders as Jessica Jones for four episodes.

== Filmography ==
Film
Year	Title	Role	Notes
2012	Ghostlands	Liz	Short film
2013	Jimi: All Is by My Side	Mona	
2015	Ooops! Noah Is Gone...	—	Composer and performer; end credits song
2016	Moon Dogs	Caitlin	
2016	A Date for Mad Mary	Jess	
2016	The Flag	—	Music department; vocals
2016	Jack Taylor	—	Composer; theme song
2018	Dark Justice	Sophie	
2018	Alright Now	Hannah	
2019	Schemers	Shona	
2020	The Racer	Dr Lynn Brennan	
2021	Love Spreads	Alice	
2022	The Cellar	Erica	
2023	Evil Dead Rise		Music department; vocals
2023	Sally Leapt out of a Window Last Night	Sally	Short film

Television
Year	Title	Role	Notes
2012	13 Steps Down	Girl in Off Licence	Episode: "#1.2"
2012–2013	Raw	Emma Kelly	12 episodes
2014–2016	The Fall	Daisy Drake	7 episodes
2018	EastEnders	Jessica Jones	4 episodes
2022	The Suspect	Catherine McCain	5 episodes
2024	Finders Keepers	Phoenix	Episode: "Part One"
2024	Shetland	Lisa Friel	6 episodes

Web
Year	Title	Role	Notes
2014	8 Good Reasons	Young Sinéad	Sinéad O'Connor music video

== Discography ==
=== Singles ===
Title	Year	Album
"Wild At Heart" (featuring J. Left)	2010	Non-album single
"Soundtrack"	2015	Soundtrack
"If I Burn (You Burn Too)"	2017	Non-album singles
"Paradise"	2017	Non-album singles
"Narcotic Heart"	2017	Non-album singles
"Boyz"	2018	Non-album singles
"Drive"	2018	Non-album singles
"Burn"	2019	Non-album singles
"Still Yours"	2019	Non-album singles
"Killing Strangers"	2019	Noir
