= Eternal Beauty =

2019 film by Craig Roberts

- Official poster
- Directed by: Craig Roberts
- Written by: Craig Roberts
- Produced by: Adrian Bate
- Starring: Sally Hawkins; Alice Lowe; Billie Piper; Robert Pugh; Morfydd Clark; Paul Hilton; Boyd Clack; Elysia Welch; Penelope Wilton; David Thewlis; Natalie O'Neill
- Cinematography: Kit Fraser
- Edited by: Stephen Haren
- Music by: Michael Price
- Production companies: Cliff Edge Pictures; BFI; Wellcome; Ffilm Cymru Wales
- Distributed by: Bulldog Film Distribution
- Release dates: 8 October 2019 (LFF); 2 October 2020 (United Kingdom)
- Running time: 95 minutes
- Country: United Kingdom
- Language: English
- Box office: $68,960

Eternal Beauty is a 2019 British dark comedy film written and directed by Craig Roberts. It stars Sally Hawkins, David Thewlis, Billie Piper, Penelope Wilton, Alice Lowe and Robert Aramayo.

It had its world premiere at the BFI London Film Festival on 8 October 2019. It was released in the United Kingdom on 2 October 2020, by Bulldog Film Distribution.

== Plot ==
A young woman's life descends into mental illness after being left at the altar due to her fiancé running off with a man.

== Cast ==
- Sally Hawkins as Jane
  - Morfydd Clark as Young Jane
- David Thewlis as Mike
- Billie Piper as Nicola
  - Natalie O'Neill as Young Nicola
- Penelope Wilton as Vivian
- Alice Lowe as Alice
  - Elysia Welch as Young Alice
- Robert Aramayo as Johnny
- Robert Pugh as Dennis
- Paul Hilton as Tony
- Rita Bernard-Shaw as Lucy
- Banita Sandhu as Alex
- Boyd Clack as Psychiatrist

== Production ==
In December 2017, it was announced Sally Hawkins had been cast in the film, with Craig Roberts directing from a screenplay he wrote. Cliff Edge Pictures will produce the film. In February 2018, Alice Lowe and David Thewlis joined the cast of the film. In June 2018, Billie Piper and Penelope Wilton joined the cast of the film. That same month, Robert Pugh, Paul Hilton and Morfydd Clark joined the cast. In July 2018, Robert Aramayo joined the cast.

Principal photography began in June 2018 in Wales.

== Release ==
It had its world premiere at the BFI London Film Festival on 8 October 2019. In May 2019, Sony Pictures Worldwide Acquisitions acquired distribution rights to the film outside the U.S., Canada, France, Germany, Austria, Switzerland, the U.K., Ireland, China, Japan, South Korea and the Middle East. In July 2020, Samuel Goldwyn Films acquired U.S. distribution rights to the film. It was released in the United Kingdom on 2 October 2020 and in the United States.

== Reception ==
The film received positive reviews from 78% of 54 critics on Rotten Tomatoes, with an average rating of 6.7/10. The site's critical consensus reads, "Eternal Beauty deals unevenly yet honorably with complicated themes, elevated by strong work from the ever-reliable Sally Hawkins and David Thewlis."
