= Laura Patch =

British comedy actor (born 1976)

- Born: 21 June 1976 (age 50); London, England
- Occupation: Actor
- Years active: 1994–present
- Height: 5 ft 7 in (170 cm)
- Movement: Television

Laura Patch (born 21 June 1976) is a British comedy actor, best known for playing several characters in the Channel 4 series Star Stories alongside Kevin Bishop.

== TV ==
- 2002: Lexx, playing Piccalina Sternflanks in Series 4, Episode 14 "Prime Ridge".
- 2003 and 2006: The Bill, playing Izzy Scott, then Mandy Francis.
- 2006–2008: Star Stories playing Kate Moss, Christina Aguilera, Jennifer Aniston, Sarah Harding, Nicole Appleton, Emma Bunton, Katie Holmes, Paris Hilton, Shirlie Holliman, Rebecca Loos, Trudie Styler.
- 2006: Life Begins, playing Tina.
- 2008: Dolly and Laura, playing herself with Dolly Wells.
- 2008: The IT Crowd, playing the Tour Guide in Series 3, Episode 3 "Tramps Like Us"
- 2012: Being Human, playing Michaela Thompson
- 2014: New Tricks, playing the Florist in Series 11, Episode 3 "Deep Swimming"
- 2019–2020: After Life, playing Jill

== Film ==
- 1999: Distant Bridges, playing Amy Thompson.
- 2015: Black Mountain Poets
