= Dolly Wells =

British actress (born 1971)

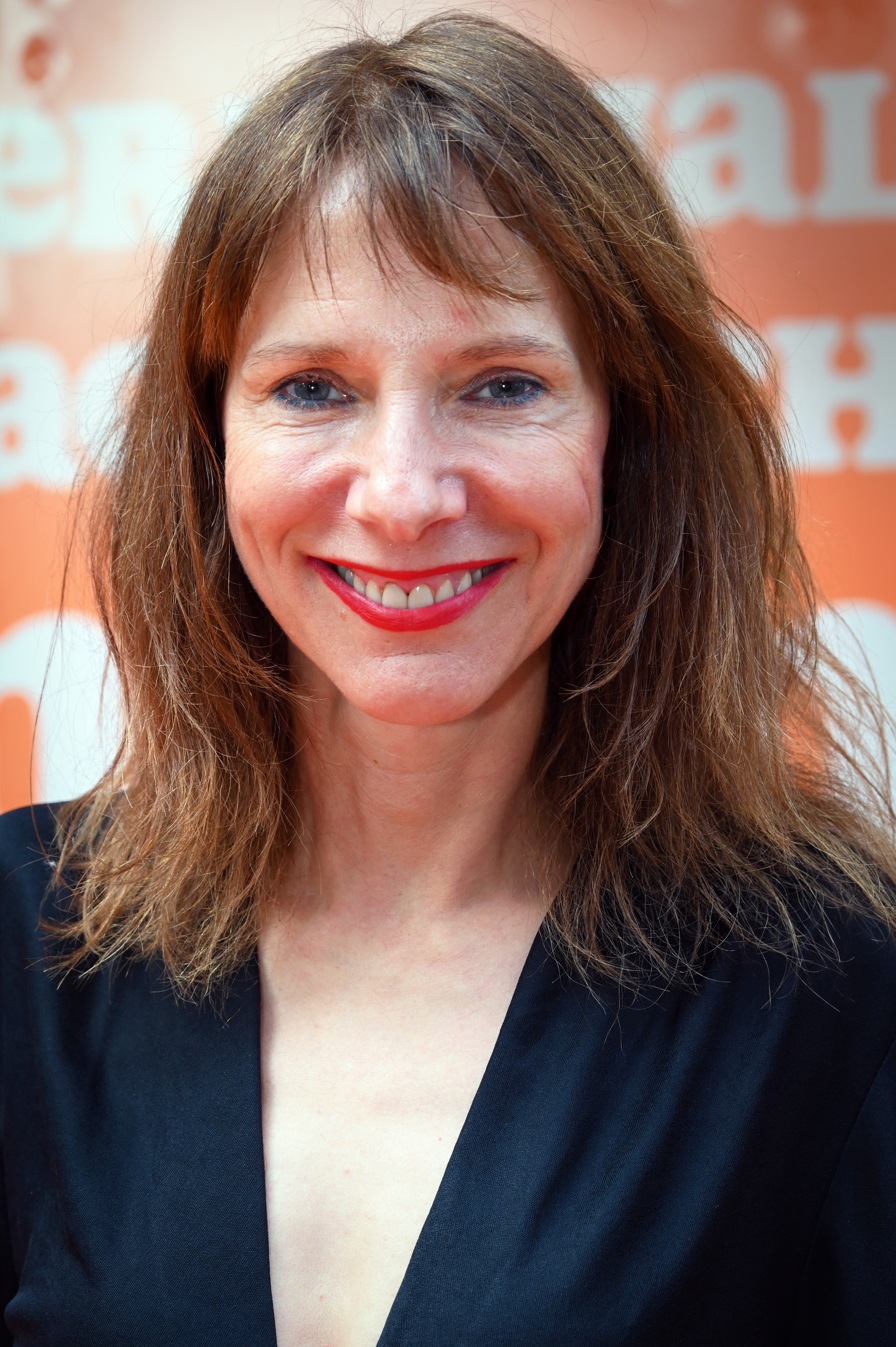
- Wells in 2026
- Born: Dorothy Perpetua Gatacre; 5 December 1971 (age 54); Merton, London, England
- Occupation: Actress
- Years active: 1997–present
- Spouse: Mischa Richter (m. 2000; div. 2022)
- Children: 2
- Parent: John Wells
- Relatives: Christopher Chancellor (maternal grandfather); Anna Chancellor (cousin)

Dorothy Perpetua Wells (born Gatacre; 5 December 1971) is an English actress. She co-wrote and starred in the Sky Living series Doll & Em (2014–2015) with Emily Mortimer, and wrote and directed the 2019 comedy-drama Good Posture. Her other television work includes roles in Star Stories (2006–2008), Some Girls (2012–2014), Noel Fielding's Luxury Comedy (2012–2014), Blunt Talk (2015–2016), Dracula (2020), The Outlaws (2021), and Inside Man (2022).

== Early life ==
Wells was born Dorothy Gatacre, in Merton, London, on 5 December 1971, the youngest of six children. She is the daughter of comic actor John Wells and Teresa Chancellor, daughter of Sir Christopher Chancellor, general manager of Reuters from 1944 to 1959. Wells grew up thinking her father was her stepfather, and did not find out he was her biological father until she was eighteen. She later changed her name from Gatacre—her mother's first husband was Edward Gatacre—to Wells. Her first cousin is the actress Anna Chancellor.

She was educated in a Catholic convent school, after failing the entrance exam for St Paul's. While trying to build an acting career, she worked as a journalist at the Evening Standard and as a book reviewer.

== Personal life ==
Wells married photographer Mischa Richter in 2000. In 2020, Wells and Richter divorced.

== Filmography ==
=== Films ===
Year	Title	Role	Notes
1998	The Sea Change	Jane	
2001	Far on Foot	Sophie Cartwright	Short film
2001	Bridget Jones's Diary	Woney	
2002	Morvern Callar	Susan	
2003	Nobody Needs to Know	Dolly	Associate producer
2003	I Capture the Castle	Fur Department Vendeuse	
2008	Franklyn	Nurse	
2009	Mr. Right	Fizz	
2012	Tumult	Tour Guide	Short film
2014	Benny & Jolene	Rosamund	
2015	Black Mountain Poets	Claire	
2015	45 Years	Sally	
2016	Pride and Prejudice and Zombies	Mrs. Featherstone	
2016	Bridget Jones's Baby	Woney	
2017	Izzy Gets the F*ck Across Town	The Woman in the Field	
2017	Home Again	Tracy	
2017	I Do... Until I Don't	Vivian Prudeck	
2018	Boundaries	Sofia	
2018	Furlough	SA Group Leader	
2018	Can You Ever Forgive Me?	Anna Miller	
2019	Good Posture		Writer and director
2019	The Return of the Yuletide Kid	Agent	
2020	The Stand In	Second AD Daisy	
2021	Love Spreads	Julie	
2022	Susie Searches	Professor Gallagher	
2023	Three Birthdays	Marian	
2024	Down, Down, Down	Sarah	Short film
2024	Babygirl	Therapist	
2025	Bridget Jones: Mad About the Boy	Woney	

=== Television ===
Year	Title	Role	Notes
1997	The Bill	Janet James	1 episode
1998	Dinnerladies	Hannah	1 episode
1998	Midsomer Murders	Ava Rokeby	1 episode
1999	In the Name of Love	Helen Walters	TV film
1999	Goodnight Sweetheart	Celia Johnson	1 episode
2000	Murder Rooms: Mysteries of the Real Sherlock Holmes	Elspeth Scott	1 episode
2002	The Gathering Storm	Sarah Churchill	TV film
2002	Bertie and Elizabeth	Princess Mary	TV film
2003–2008	Peep Show	Paula	2 episodes
2004	The Final Quest	Anthea	TV film
2004	Sex Traffic	Sarah	TV film
2004	Murphy's Law	Susan Green	1 episode
2006	Doctors	Claire Morris	1 episode
2006–2008	Star Stories	Various characters	12 episodes
2007	The Mighty Boosh	Methuselah	1 episode
2007–2010	The IT Crowd	Miranda / Paula	2 episodes
2009	Comedy Showcase	Lydia Tennant	1 episode
2009	Free Agents	Sarah Stephens	3 episodes
2009–2011	Campus	Lydia Tennant	7 episodes
2011–2012	Spy	Judith Elliot	16 episodes
2012	Starlings	Annika	1 episode
2012	Casualty	Josie Betts	1 episode
2012	Pramface	Ante-natal Instructress	1 episode
2012–2014	Some Girls	Anna Hitchcock	18 episodes
2012–2014	Noel Fielding's Luxury Comedy	Various characters	9 episodes
2014–2015	Doll & Em	Dolly	12 episodes; also creator, writer, associate producer
2015–2016	Blunt Talk	Celia Havemeyer	20 episodes
2016	Younger	Stephanie	1 episode
2018	Portlandia	Dolly Wells	1 episode
2018	Room 104	Catherine	1 episode
2020	Dracula	Sister Agatha Van Helsing / Dr. Zoe Van Helsing	Miniseries
2020	Soulmates	Jennifer	1 episode
2021	The Pursuit of Love	Aunt Sadie	3 episodes
2021	Around the World in 80 Days	Estella	1 episode
2021–2022	The Outlaws	Margaret	11 episodes
2022	Inside Man	Janice Fife	Miniseries
2023–2025	And Just Like That...	Joy	12 episodes
2024	Here We Go	Penny	1 episode
2024	The Completely Made-Up Adventures of Dick Turpin	Eliza Bean	5 episodes
2024	Hacks	Laurie	1 episode
2026	Two Weeks in August	Flick	TV Series
