= Craig Roberts =

Welsh actor (born 1991)

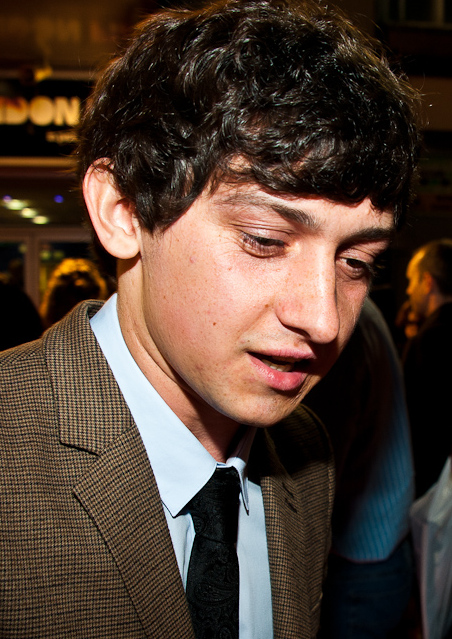
- Roberts in 2013
- Born: Craig Haydn Roberts; 21 January 1991 (age 35); Wales, United Kingdom
- Occupations: Actor, director
- Years active: 2000–present

Craig Haydn Roberts (born 21 January 1991) is a Welsh actor and director. He is best known for lead roles as Oliver Tate in the coming-of-age comedy-drama film Submarine (2010), David Meyers in the series Red Oaks (2014–2017) and as Rio Wellard in the television series The Story of Tracy Beaker (2004–2006).

== Early life and education ==
Craig Haydn Roberts was born on 21 January 1991, the son of Alison Bishop and Haydn Roberts. He was raised in Maesycwmmer, Caerphilly, and attended Lewis School, Pengam.

== Career ==
Roberts began his television career in the dramas Care (2000) and Little Pudding (2003). After these he was given roles in the series The Story of Tracy Beaker (2004–2006) and Casualty (2005–2008), and played vampire fanatic Robin Branagh in Young Dracula (2006–2008). He also appeared in the dramas Kiddo (2005) and Scratching (2006).

On stage, Roberts toured Britain in 2008 with Y Touring Theatre Company, playing young Ryan in Full Time, a play that explores racism, sexism, and homophobia in football. In January 2009 he played the evil queen's sidekick Drax in the pantomime Snow White at Worthing.

In 2010, Roberts had worldwide success with the teenage lead role in the film Submarine, based on the 2008 novel by Joe Dunthorne. It was directed by Richard Ayoade and also starred Paddy Considine and Yasmin Paige.

Since then Roberts has appeared in the BBC Three television show Being Human (2011, 2012) and in the online spin-off series Becoming Human (2011) as Adam.

In 2012, he starred in The Killers' music video for "Here with Me" with Winona Ryder, directed by Tim Burton. He also starred in Kassidy's music video for "One Man Army" in 2012.

In late 2012, Roberts started working on a short television comedy he wrote and directed, entitled The Sheepish Approach. In 2014, he starred in the film Jolene: The Indie Folk Star alongside Charlotte Ritchie and Rosamund Hanson. He played the role of Dom in the seventh series of the TV show Skins, and "Assjuice" in the 2014 film Neighbors. He also appeared in the Manic Street Preachers video for "Show Me the Wonder" and directed the music video for the Los Campesinos! single "Avocado, Baby" from their album No Blues.

In 2015, Roberts made his feature-director debut with Just Jim, which he also wrote and starred in.

On 9 October 2015, Amazon Studios released season 1 of Red Oaks, an original comedy series where Roberts stars alongside Paul Reiser. Season 2 was released in late 2016, after which the show was renewed for a third and final season.

Roberts starred in the 2016 film The Fundamentals of Caring alongside Paul Rudd. He played Trevor, a quick-witted 18-year-old boy with Duchenne muscular dystrophy. The film premièred at the Sundance Film Festival in January and was released on Netflix in June.

In 2019, Roberts appeared in the film Horrible Histories: The Movie – Rotten Romans as Emperor Nero.

== Filmography ==
=== Film ===
| Year | Title | Role | Notes |
|---|---|---|---|
| 2006 | Scratching | Mike | Short film |
| 2010 | Submarine | Oliver Tate | |
| 2011 | Jane Eyre | John Reed | |
| 2012 | Red Lights | Ben | |
| 2012 | The First Time | Simon Daldry | |
| 2012 | Comes a Bright Day | Sam Smith | |
| 2013 | Benny & Jolene | Benny | |
| 2013 | The Power Inside | Neil | |
| 2013 | The Double | Detective | |
| 2014 | Neighbors | Gary "Assjuice" | |
| 2014 | 22 Jump Street | Spencer | |
| 2014 | TEOTFW | James | Short film |
| 2014 | Premature | Stanley | |
| 2014 | Sunday Roast | Arthur Bird | Short film |
| 2015 | Kill Your Friends | Darren | |
| 2015 | Just Jim | Jim | Also writer and director |
| 2016 | The Fundamentals of Caring | Trevor | |
| 2017 | The Current War | Robert Lane | |
| 2019 | Tolkien | Sam Hodges | |
| 2019 | Bittersweet Symphony | Bobby | |
| 2019 | Horrible Histories: The Movie – Rotten Romans | Emperor Nero | |
| 2019 | Eternal Beauty | —N/a | Writer and director |
| 2021 | The Phantom of the Open | —N/a | Director |
| 2026 | Let's Love | TBA | |
| TBA | The Scurry | —N/a | Director |

=== Television ===
| Year | Title | Role | Notes |
|---|---|---|---|
| 2000 | Care | Craig, Pauline's Child | Television film |
| 2003 | Little Pudding | | Television film |
| 2005–2006 | The Story of Tracy Beaker | Rio Wellard | 36 episodes |
| 2005 | Kiddo | Jay | Television film |
| 2005, 2008 | Casualty | Darren Smith / Jordan Philpot | 2 episodes |
| 2006–2008 | Young Dracula | Robin Branagh | 27 episodes |
| 2011 | Being Human | Adam | 2 episodes |
| 2013 | Skins | Dominic | 2 episodes |
| 2013 | Playhouse Presents | Carl | Episode: "Cargese" |
| 2014 | Under Milk Wood | Nogood Boyo | Television film |
| 2014–2017 | Red Oaks | David Myers | 26 episodes |
| 2015 | Hoff the Record | Josh Brooke-Webb | Episode: "The Movie" |
| 2023 | Still Up | Danny | Main role |
| 2026 | Can You Keep a Secret? | Harry Fendon | Main role |

=== Music videos ===
| Year | Title | Role | Artist | Notes |
|---|---|---|---|---|
| 2012 | "Here with Me" | Wax Boy | The Killers | |
| 2012 | "One Man Army" | | Kassidy | |
| 2013 | "Avocado, Baby" | N/A | Los Campesinos! | Director |
| 2013 | "Show Me the Wonder" | N/A | Manic Street Preachers | |
| 2019 | "Rom-Com Gone Wrong" | N/A | Matt Maltese | Director |

== Awards and nominations ==
| Year | Award | Category | Film | Result | Ref. |
|---|---|---|---|---|---|
| 2011 | British Independent Film Award | Most Promising Newcomer | Submarine | Nominated | |
| 2012 | London Film Critics' Circle | Young British Performer of the Year | Submarine | Won | |
| 2012 | Empire Award | Best Male Newcomer | Submarine | Nominated | |
| 2012 | BAFTA Cymru Award | Best Actor | Submarine | Won | |
| 2016 | BAFTA Cymru Award | Best Writer | Just Jim | Nominated | |
| 2016 | Fantasporto Film Festival | Director's Week Special Jury Award Best actor | Just Jim | Won | |
| 2016 | Fantasporto Film Festival | Director's Week Award Best film | Just Jim | Nominated | |
