= Richard Elis =

Welsh actor (born 1975)

- Born: 1975 (age 50–51); Wales
- Education: Royal Welsh College of Music & Drama
- Occupation: Actor
- Spouse: Tonya Smith
- Children: 2

Richard Elis (born 1975) is a Welsh actor.

== Career ==
He trained at the Welsh College of Music and Drama and graduated in 1996, aged 21. Days before he graduated, Elis was asked to audition for London casting agents and was subsequently cast in the BBC soap opera EastEnders as the serial's first Welsh character, Huw Edwards. Elis was initially only scripted to appear in three episodes, but the producers liked the portrayal and his contract was extended. Elis remained in the soap for three years, leaving in 1999 as he feared typecasting.

He went on to appear in S4C's critically acclaimed drama Ar Y Tracs, Pobol Y Cwm, numerous theatre productions as well as roles in the HTV (now ITV Wales) drama series Nuts and Bolts, The Bill, Casualty, Coronation Street and Doctors. He has also appeared in a variety of adverts for products and brands such as Wicked, Bisto, McLeans, Sky, Peugeot, Renault, a Dutch milk company in the Netherlands and notably in the WKD adverts. He has also appeared in numerous independent British Films including Benny and Jolene, Black Mountain Poets, Songbird and Wild Honey Pie! In August 2006, Elis provided the voice of "Welsh Big Brother" as part of a task during series seven of the Channel 4 reality television series Big Brother. During the aforementioned task, housemates had to talk to Big Brother in Welsh whilst in the diary room. Out of the remaining contestants, Glyn Wise was the only one who was from Wales and a fluent Welsh speaker.

From 2018 he appeared as Marshall in the BBC One Wales mockumentary series Tourist Trap. In 2021, he appeared in the BBC drama series The Pact. Throughout 2022, Elis presented the interview podcast Cuppa Tea Is It, with Aled Pugh and Simon Nehan. In May 2023, he appeared in an episode of the BBC soap opera Doctors as Darren Warner.

Elis is married to Pobol Y Cwm actress Tonya Smith, who plays Yvonne in the Welsh-language soap opera. They married in 1998 and have two daughters.
