= Emily Mortimer filmography =

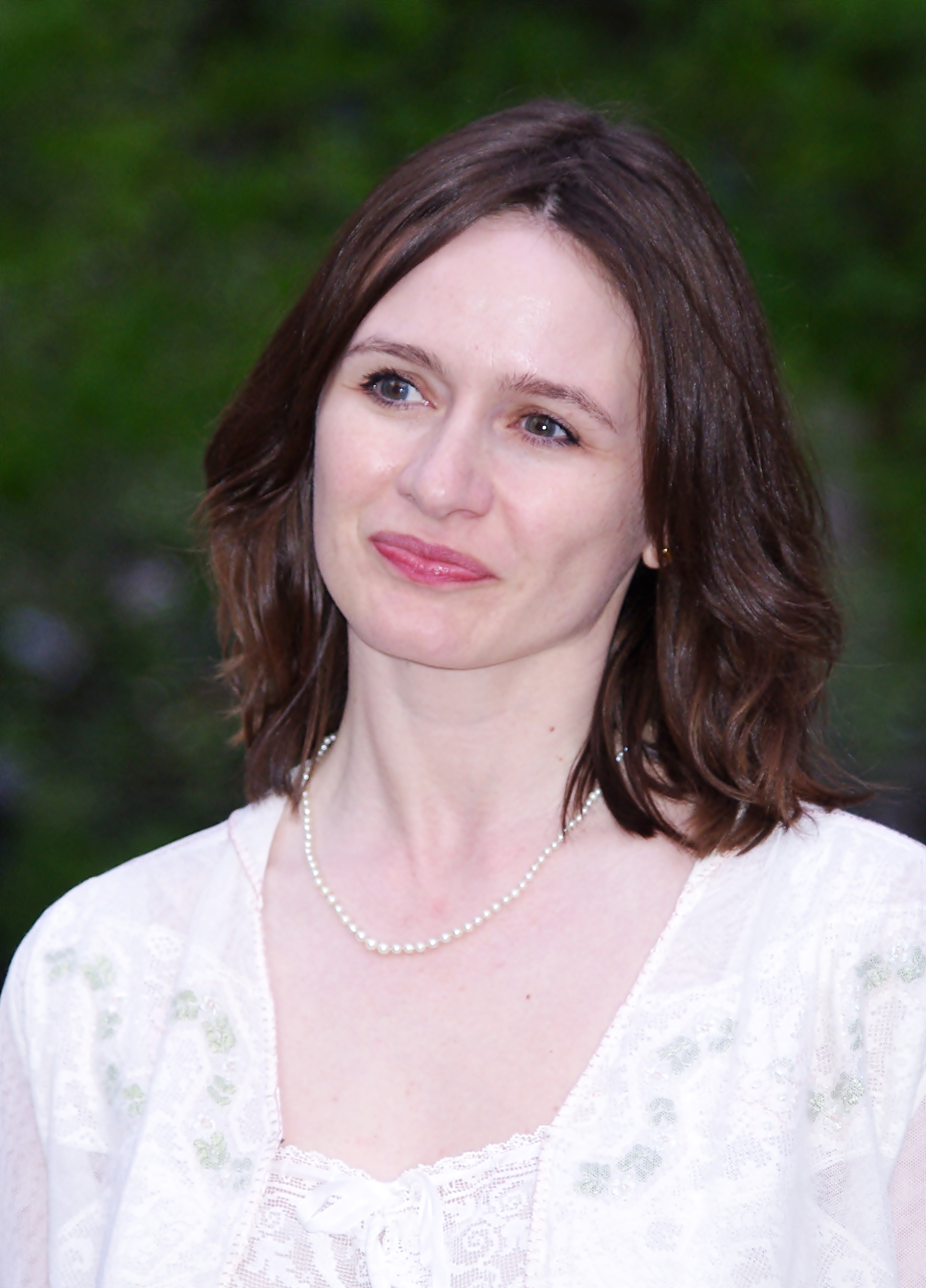
Mortimer in 2011

Emily Mortimer is a British actress. She gained prominence with her performance in Nicole Holofcener's Lovely & Amazing (2001), which won her the Independent Spirit Award for Best Supporting Female. She is also known for her voice performance in the English dub of Hayao Miyazaki's Howl's Moving Castle, and for her roles in Match Point (2005), The Pink Panther (2006), Lars and the Real Girl (2007), Shutter Island (2010), and Mary Poppins Returns (2018). In television, she starred as Mackenzie McHale on HBO's The Newsroom (2012–2014), and marked her directorial debut with the miniseries The Pursuit of Love (2021). She also starred alongside Bruce Willis in The Kid in 2000.

== Film ==
Year	Title	Role	Notes
1995	The Glass Virgin	Annabella Lagrange	
1996	The Ghost and the Darkness	Helena Patterson	
1996	The Last of the High Kings	Romy Thomas	
1997	The Saint	Woman on Plane	
1998	Elizabeth	Kat Ashley	
1999	Notting Hill	Will's "Perfect Girl"	
2000	Scream 3	Angelina Tyler	
2000	Love's Labour's Lost	Katherine	
2000	The Miracle Maker	Mary of Nazareth	Voice role
2000	Disney's The Kid	Amy	
2001	Lovely & Amazing	Elizabeth Marks	
2001	The 51st State	Dakota Parker	
2003	A Foreign Affair	Angela Beck	
2003	The Sleeping Dictionary	Cecil	
2003	Bright Young Things	Nina Blount	
2003	Young Adam	Cathie Dimly	
2004	Dear Frankie	Lizzie	
2004	Howl's Moving Castle	Young Sophie	Voice role (English dub)
2005	Match Point	Chloe Hewett Wilton	
2006	Paris, je t'aime	Frances	Segment: "Père-Lachaise"
2006	The Pink Panther	Nicole Durant	
2007	Lars and the Real Girl	Karin	
2008	Transsiberian	Jessie	
2008	Chaos Theory	Susan Allen	
2008	Redbelt	Laura Black	
2009	The Pink Panther 2	Nicole Durant	
2009	Harry Brown	DI Alice Frampton	
2009	City Island	Molly Charlesworth	
2010	Shutter Island	Rachel Solando	
2010	Leonie	Leonie Gilmour	
2011	Cars 2	Holley Shiftwell	Voice role
2011	Our Idiot Brother	Liz	
2011	Hugo	Lisette	
2014	Rio, I Love You	Dorothy	Segment: "La Fortuna"
2015	Ten Thousand Saints	Di Urbanski	
2016	Spectral	CIA Officer Fran Madison	
2017	The Sense of an Ending	Sarah Ford	
2017	The Party	Jinny	
2017	The Bookshop	Florence Green	
2018	Write When You Get Work	Nan Noble	
2018	To Dust	N/A	Producer
2018	Head Full of Honey	Sarah	
2018	Mary Poppins Returns	Jane Banks	
2019	Good Posture	Julia Price	
2019	Phil	Alicia	
2019	Mary	Sarah	
2020	Relic	Kay	
2021	With/In: Volume 2		Segment: "Neighborhood Watch"
2024	Paddington in Peru	Mary Brown	Replacing Sally Hawkins
2025	Jay Kelly	Candy	Also co-writer with Noah Baumbach
2026	Ladies First	Sunny Black	

== Television ==
Year	Title	Role	Notes
1994	Under the Hammer	Angela	1 episode
1994	Blue Heelers	Kelly	1 episode
1995	Sharpe's Sword	Lass	Television film
1995	The Glass Virgin	Annabella Lagrange	3 episodes
1995	Screen Two	Amanda Ellis	1 episode
1996	The Ruth Rendell Mysteries	Elvira	1 episode
1996	Silent Witness	Fran	2 episodes
1996	Jack and Jeremy's Real Lives	Tilly	1 episode
1996	No Bananas	Una	Miniseries, 6 episodes
1997	Midsomer Murders	Katherine Lacey	Episode: "The Killings at Badger's Drift"
1997	A Dance to the Music of Time	Polly Duport	1 episode
1997	Coming Home	Judith Dunbar	Television film
1998	Cider with Rosie	Miss Flynn	Television film
1999	Noah's Ark	Esther	Miniseries, 3 episodes
2002	Jeffrey Archer: The Truth	Diana, Princess of Wales	Television film
2007	30 Rock	Phoebe	3 episodes
2012–2014	The Newsroom	Mackenzie McHale	Main role, 25 episodes
2014–2015	Doll & Em	Emily	Main role, 12 episodes; also creator and writer
2020	Don't Look Deeper	Sharon	Main role, 14 episodes
2021	The Pursuit of Love	The Bolter	Miniseries, 3 episodes; also writer and director
2024	The New Look	Elsa Lombardi	3 episodes
2025	Suspect: The Shooting of Jean Charles de Menezes	Cressida Dick	3 episodes
TBA	Fallout	TBA	Recurring role (season 3)

== Video games ==
Year	Title	Role
2011	Cars 2: The Video Game	Holley Shiftwell (voice)
2012	Kinect Rush: A Disney-Pixar Adventure	Holley Shiftwell (voice)
2013	Disney Infinity	Holley Shiftwell (voice)
2014	Disney Infinity: Marvel Super Heroes, Cars: Fast as Lightning	Holley Shiftwell (voice)
2015	Disney Infinity 3.0	Holley Shiftwell (voice)
