= Chiantishire =

Nickname for an area of Tuscany, Italy

Coordinates: 43°35′03″N 11°18′57″E

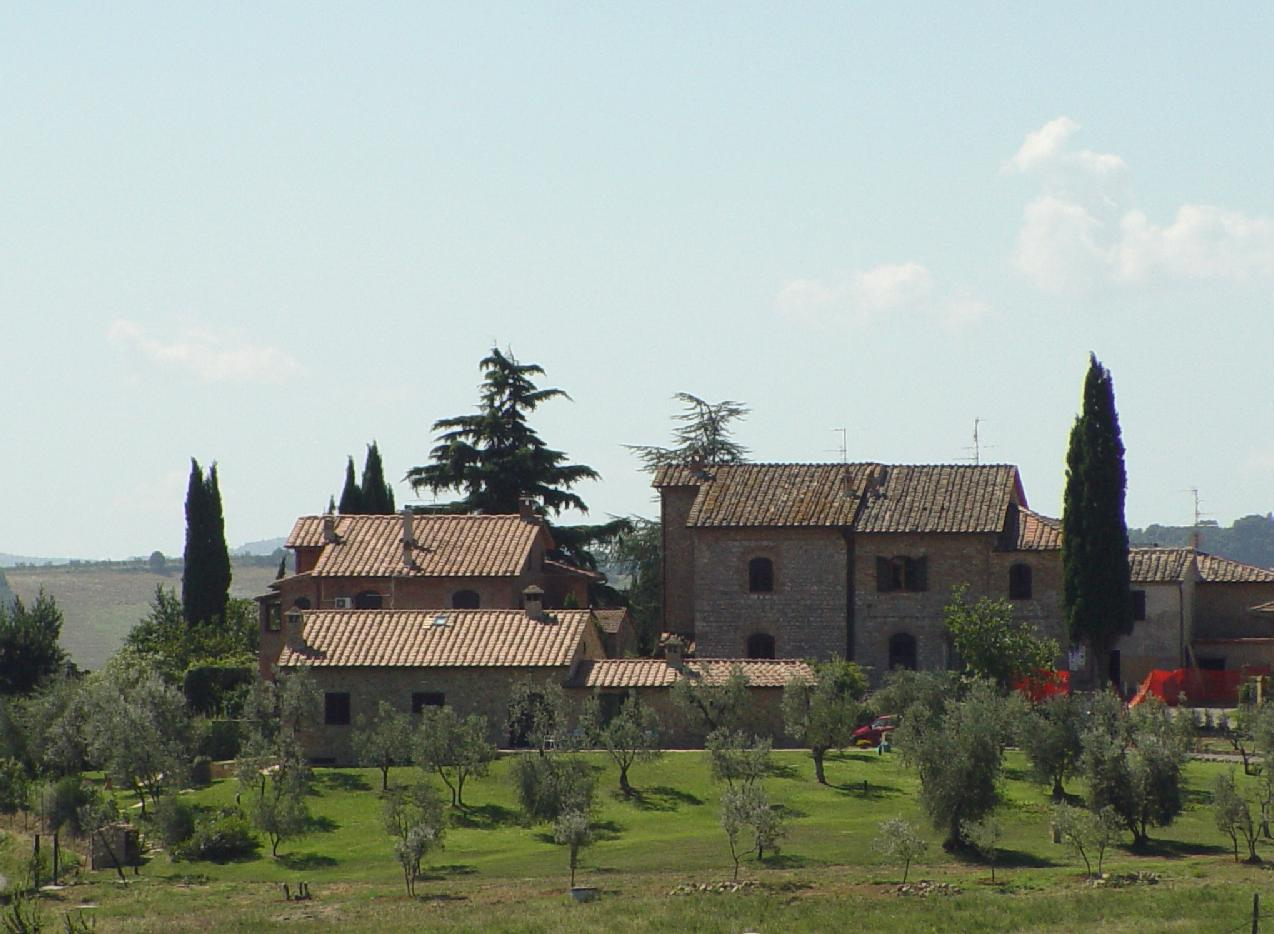
A characteristic estate in Tuscany

Chiantishire is a nickname for an area of Tuscany, Italy, where many upper class British citizens have moved or usually spend their holidays. The word is a late 20th century neologism and derives from Chianti, a red wine produced in central Tuscany, in particular in the provinces of Siena and Florence. The location rose to prominence in the UK in the mid 1990s when then Prime Minister Tony Blair chose it as one of his preferred summer retreats. Celebrities who have owned properties in the area include Sting, Bryan Ferry, Antonio Banderas and Richard Gere. The novel Summer's Lease by John Mortimer and its British television adaptation starring Sir John Gielgud characterise satirically the manners and mores of British expatriates in Chiantishire.

The Foreign and Commonwealth Office estimated in 2012 that there were 28,000 Britons living in Italy.
