= Christopher Warren-Green =

British violinist and conductor (born 1955)

- Born: Christopher Warren-Green; 30 July 1955 (age 71)
- Genre: Classical
- Occupation: Conductor
- Instrument: Violin
- Years active: 1975–present
- Formerly of: Charlotte Symphony Orchestra/ London Chamber Orchestra; Orchestra of the Megaron

Christopher Warren-Green (born 30 July 1955) is a British violinist and conductor.

== Biography ==
Warren-Green was born in Gloucestershire and attended Westminster City School, where he was a chorister, and later the Royal Academy of Music.

Warren-Green has served as concertmaster of the Philharmonia Orchestra. Warren-Green has held the position of Music Director of the London Chamber Orchestra (LCO) since 1988. In 2005, Vladimir Ashkenazy invited Warren-Green and the LCO to Hong Kong as the resident orchestra for the Hong Kong International Piano Competition.

In 1998, Warren-Green became Principal Guest Conductor of the Nordic Chamber Orchestra, taking over as Chief Conductor from 2001 until 2005. From 1998 to 2001, he was Chief Conductor of the Joenkoeping Sinfonietta. He served as co-principal conductor of the Camerata Resident Orchestra of the Megaron Athens from 2004 to 2009. In May 2009, the Charlotte Symphony Orchestra named Warren-Green its 11th music director, effective with the 2010–2011 season. In August 2012, the orchestra announced the extension of Warren-Green's contract through the 2015–2016 season. Warren-Green concluded his Charlotte Symphony Orchestra tenure at the close of the 2021-2022 season.

In July 2007, Warren-Green conducted the premiere of Nigel Hess's Concerto for Piano and Orchestra, commissioned by the Prince of Wales (later King Charles III) in memory of his grandmother, with soloist Lang Lang. In August 2008, Warren-Green appeared in the reality TV talent show-themed television series, Maestro on BBC Two, as a mentor to Jane Asher, one of the students. He conducted the London Chamber Orchestra at the April 2011 wedding of the Duke and Duchess of Cambridge before a worldwide television audience. On the personal invitation of the Prince of Wales, Warren-Green was invited to arrange the music and conduct the Philharmonia Orchestra for the Service of Dedication and Prayer celebrating the marriage of the Prince of Wales and the Duchess of Cornwall (later Queen Camilla). To mark the occasion of the Queen Elizabeth II's 80th birthday at Kew Palace, he conducted a private concert for the entire Royal family. In May 2018, he conducted the orchestra at the royal wedding of Prince Harry and Meghan Markle.

Warren-Green has recorded for BMG, EMI, Philips, Virgin, Warner Classics, Chandos and Deutsche Grammophon.

Warren-Green is married to Rosemary Furniss, a violinist, and artistic director and concertmaster of the LCO. They have three children and three stepchildren.

Cultural offices
Preceded by Anthony Bernard	Music Director, London Chamber Orchestra; 1988–present	Succeeded by incumbent
Preceded by Alexandros Myrat, Sir Neville Marriner	Principal Conductor, Camerata Resident Orchestra of the Megaron Athens; 2004–2009	Succeeded by Alexandros Myrat
Preceded by Christof Perick	Music Director, Charlotte Symphony Orchestra; 2010–2022	Succeeded by Kwamé Ryan
