= Chimera (British TV series) =

1991 British TV miniseries

- Written by: Stephen Gallagher
- Directed by: Lawrence Gordon Clark
- Starring: John Lynch; Christine Kavanagh; Kenneth Cranham
- Theme music composer: "Róisín Dubh" by Chameleon
- Composer: Nigel Hess
- Country of origin: United Kingdom
- Original language: English

Production
- Executive producers: Brenda Reid; Archie Tait
- Producer: Nick Gillott
- Cinematography: Ken Westbury
- Editor: Alan Pattillo
- Running time: 4x60 minutes (TV version); 104 minutes (Movie version)
- Production companies: Zenith Entertainment; Anglia Films

Original release
- Network: ITV
- Release: 7 July – 28 July 1991

Chimera is a British science-fiction horror drama made by Zenith Productions and Anglia Films for ITV in 1991. It is based on the 1982 novel of the same name about genetic engineering by Stephen Gallagher. Gallagher had previously adapted the novel as a 90 minute dramatised audio drama for BBC Radio 4 in 1985. The theme music of the TV mini-series was "Roisin Dubh" by Nigel Hess and Chameleon.

Although set in rural Cumbria, filming took place in North Yorkshire with the village of Kettlewell providing the outdoor scenes. The setting for The Jenner Clinic was the nearby Malham Tarn Field Studies Centre, a Grade II listed Georgian country house owned by the National Trust. Studio filming took place at Shepperton Studios in Surrey.

The series was later re-edited for release in the United States, and retitled Monkey Boy.

== Plot ==
Tracy Pickford (Emer Gillespie) leaves her job as a nurse in a busy A&E department in London to take up a new post at the Jenner Clinic in rural Cumbria. The clinic provides private fertility treatment to mothers struggling to conceive, but despite the quiet atmosphere and calmer pace of work, Tracy becomes restless and begins to suspect that there is more to the clinic than meets the eye. There is a secure room protected by a keypad in one of the outbuildings which she is told contains live animals for research, but which she is not allowed to enter. She also overhears Dr. Jenner (David Calder), the clinic's founder, meeting with several mysterious officials, and the topics of their conversations do not seem to pertain to the clinic's work.

One night, she witnesses a commotion where someone — or something — is brought to the clinic in the back of a van, but she is unable to get a good look at them before they are sedated and taken away, with Dr. Jenner berating the security personnel for allowing "him" to escape. She is told that one of the chimpanzees escaped from the research lab, but upon investigation the next morning, she finds the words "HELP ME" scrawled into the dirt in the back of the van.

Tracy is called in for a meeting with Dr. Jenner where he reveals that there is indeed more to the clinic's work than advertised and promises to let her into his confidence shortly. However, feeling increasingly unsettled by the events she has witnessed, Tracy leaves a voicemail message with Peter Carson (John Lynch), her on-again, off-again boyfriend in London, expressing her concerns about the clinic.

That night, an unseen assailant goes on a rampage through the clinic, killing all of the staff, including Dr. Jenner, as well as Mrs Forester (Liz Brailford), one of the patients. The assailant also starts a fire in the main building. Tracy is the last survivor, but when she ventures outside and discovers the dead bodies of her former colleagues piled up in the courtyard, she too is killed.

In London, Peter receives Tracy's voicemail and, unaware that she is already dead, makes his way to Cumbria. He is stopped by the local police on approach to the clinic and taken to a nearby village where the police have established a base of operations to investigate the massacre. Peter is asked to identify Tracy's body, but is frustrated when the police refuse to tell him what is going on. The police in turn find themselves frozen out of the investigation when a government official named Hennessey (Kenneth Cranham) arrives and hands control over to the army, who begin a manhunt for the killer across the surrounding countryside.

Peter meets Alison Wells (Christine Kavanagh), a former researcher at the clinic who survived the massacre because she was away when it occurred. Determined to find out what happened to Tracy, Peter resolves to begin his own investigation, but is warned by Alison not to do so due to Hennessey's involvement.

Using his contacts from his work as a journalist, Peter locates Diane Rhomer (Pippa Haywood), a former colleague of Dr. Jenner. She in turn leads him to Dr. Liawski (Sebastian Shaw), another of Dr. Jenner's former colleagues, who now lives in a nursing home in Brighton. Liawski reveals that years earlier, building upon his research and using funding provided by Hennessey, Dr. Jenner had successfully created a human-chimpanzee hybrid as the basis for a new species which could be used for slave labour, military purposes and medical experimentation. However, only one hybrid was produced after many failed attempts, and Dr. Jenner was unable to replicate his success. Ashamed of his role in the hybrid's creation, but unable to do anything about it due to Hennessey's influence, Liawski shows Peter and Rhomer a videotape documenting the birth of the hybrid. Peter is horrified, and resolves to get the videotape seen by as many people as possible, but Rhomer is fascinated.

When Peter returns to his flat in London, he finds it being searched by plainclothes police, and is only narrowly able to escape. He takes the videotape to be copied, but when he tries to travel north to have the copies mailed out to news agencies, he is once again pursued by the police and is forced to evade them using public transport.

Meanwhile, Alison has returned to the clinic and it is revealed in flashback that the hybrid, nicknamed Chad (Douglas Mann), had been kept in captivity at the clinic for many years as the only successful result of Dr. Jenner's experiments. However, Dr. Jenner had recently perfected the process for creating human-chimpanzee hybrids and was planning to use Mrs Forester as one of the first surrogates for the next generation. No longer having need of Chad, and frustrated at his recent escape attempts, Dr. Jenner ordered for him to be dissected alive. Knowing that Chad understood his fate and taking pity on him, Alison left his cage unlocked, expecting him to simply run away. Instead, angered at Dr. Jenner's cruel treatment of him, Chad vengefully killed everyone present at the clinic before fleeing. Although Alison had hoped that Chad would return to the clinic and she could persuade him to surrender himself to the authorities, she is disappointed. Chad does return, but he remains out of sight.

Ever since his escape, Chad has been hiding in the barn at a local farm. Although capable of understanding human speech, he is unable to speak himself as Dr. Jenner cut his vocal cords when he was a baby. Nevertheless, he befriends the farmer's two children, who nickname him "Mr Scarecrow" and bring him food, but he kills their parents when they investigate his hiding place. The children remain unaware of this, continuing to feed Chad and play games with him, although they become fearful when he loses his temper upon being told he is playing cards incorrectly.

Arriving back in Cumbria, Peter is captured by the army and taken to Hennessey who is waiting at the clinic with Alison. Hennessey berates Peter for the trouble he has been causing, but leaves him with Alison, allowing Peter to reveal to her that he now knows the clinic's true purpose and that Hennessey is attempting to cover up the cause of the massacre to conceal his plans for the human-chimpanzee hybrids. Feeling ambivalent about her own role in the scheme, Alison helps Peter escape and they deduce that Chad is hiding at the farm. Upon entering the barn, Chad attacks Peter, but after Peter forces him to retreat by asserting dominance, Alison is able to persuade him to leave with them.

Peter and Alison return to the village with Chad, hoping to have him seen by as many people as possible to expose Hennessey's plans. However, before any members of the public are able to see him, Chad is shot by Mrs Forester's widowed husband (Gary Mavers) as revenge for her murder, and dies in Peter's arms as the army move in.

Later, Peter and Alison are seen back at his flat in London, with Peter expressing frustration that there has been no reaction to any of the videotapes he sent out earlier, unaware that Hennessey has intercepted them. A rumble of thunder is heard outside.

Elsewhere, Hennessey meets with Rhomer at a secret facility, where she shows him dozens of incubators containing infant human-chimpanzee hybrids.

== Cast ==
- John Lynch as Peter Carson
- Christine Kavanagh as Alison Wells
- Kenneth Cranham as Hennessey
- Peter Armitage as Sgt. Crichton
- Emer Gillespie as Nurse Tracy Pickford
- Sarah Winman as Julia
- George Costigan as Schaffer
- Pip Torrens as Windeler
- David Calder as Dr. Jenner
- Douglas Mann as Chad
- Paul O'Grady as Social Worker
- Sebastian Shaw as Dr Liawski
- David Neilson Mr Desmond Gaskell.
- Liza Tarbuck Woman on National Express coach.
- Maggie Lane Hotel Landlady
- Dhirendra Cottrell
- Gary Mavers Forester
- Richard Durden Minister
- Pippa Haywood Diane Rhomer
- Vivien Parry Rental manager
- Douglas Mann Chad Chimera

== Release ==
The series originally aired in the United Kingdom on ITV from 7 to 28 July 1991. In the United States, it aired on A&E Television Networks.

A heavily edited version of the series was released on VHS, with the title Monkey Boy, by Prism Entertainment.

The complete series was released on DVD in the United Kingdom by Revelation Films Ltd in July 2010.

The series was run for the first time on Forces TV on the 19 and 20 February 2022.
