= Summer's Lease =

1988 novel by John Mortimer

- First edition (publ. Viking Press)
- Author: John Mortimer
- Language: English
- Publisher: Viking Press
- Publication date: 1988
- ISBN: 0-670-81984-0 (first edition)
- Dewey Decimal: 823.914
- LC Class: PR6025.O7552 S8

Summer's Lease is a novel by Sir John Mortimer, author of the Rumpole novels, which is set predominantly in Italy. It was first published in 1988 and made into a British television mini-series starring Sir John Gielgud, first shown in 1989. The title "Summer's Lease" is a play on a line from William Shakespeare's Sonnet 18: And summer's lease hath all too short a date. The novel involves the leasing of a Tuscan villa for the summer holidays. It is divided into six parts: "Preparations", "Arrival", "First Week", "Second Week", "Third Week", and "The Return".

== Novel summary ==
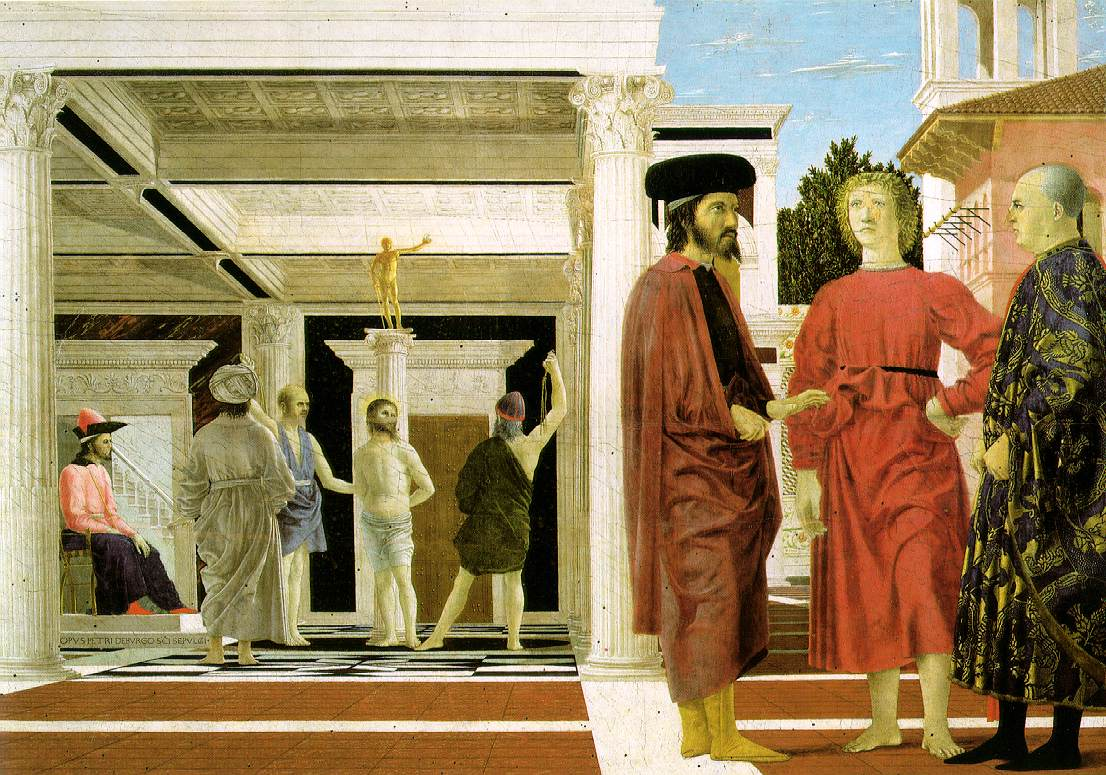
The Flagellation of Christ by Piero della Francesca, one of the recurring motifs in the novel and the TV series.

Molly Pargeter is a forty-something wife, and mother of three girls, who leads a stable but dull life in 1980s West London. She feels overweight and there is no passion in her relationship with her husband Hugh, who is secretly seeing another woman. For most of her life she has found escape in detective novels and books on art, especially about the fifteenth-century Italian fresco painter Piero della Francesca.

In a newspaper advertisement, Molly sees that a villa in Tuscany is to let and, after travelling to Italy to view the villa, "La Felicita", in the fictional town of Mondano, she decides to rent it for her family's August holiday. The villa is conveniently located for visits to the artistic centres of Florence and Siena, and also to Urbino, a day's drive away across the "Mountains of the Moon", where what Kenneth Clark called the world's greatest small picture awaits Molly: Piero's "Flagellation".

Water problems emerge in the first week of the holiday: the swimming pool becomes empty and there is no running water in the villa. In the second week, when the body of the ex-pat letting agent is discovered, also in an empty swimming pool, Molly suspects foul play. She becomes more involved with the local town of Mondano and its inhabitants: an aristocrat, a wealthy socialite, and several ex-pats who all seem to be hiding something, and is intrigued about the identity of the villa's absent owner, whom she knows only as "S. Kettering".

The search for the reason behind the disappearing water and the corpse, and discovering who S. Kettering is, becomes an obsession which leads Molly across the "Mountains of the Moon" to encounter more than just the small painting.

== Piero della Francesca Trail ==
The Piero della Francesca Trail is an excursion which traces the works created by Piero della Francesca in Arezzo, Monterchi, San Sepolcro (his birthplace) and Urbino. To his contemporaries, Piero was admired as a mathematician and geometer as well as a painter, and today his paintings are celebrated for their serene humanism and use of geometric forms.

Summer's Lease has made famous the Piero della Francesca Trail, which sees Molly set out from the Chianti District near Siena and travel to view the following paintings of Piero della Francesca:

1. The Legend of the True Cross, Basilica di San Francesco d'Assisi, Arezzo
2. The Pregnant Madonna, Museo della Madonna del Parto, Monterchi
3. The Resurrection, Museo Civico, San Sepolcro
4. The Flagellation, Galleria Nazionale delle Marche, Palazzo Ducale, Urbino

Molly and her elusive landlord Buck Kettering share a love of the art work of Piero della Francesca. The Piero della Francesca Trail ultimately leads Molly to Buck, who for reasons of his own does not want to be found.

== TV adaptation ==
In 1989 the novel was adapted for television in four parts by the BBC in association with the Australian Broadcasting Corporation, WGBH-Boston and Television New Zealand. It was directed by Martyn Friend and produced by Colin Rogers. The screenplay was by the author, John Mortimer. It featured an Emmy Award-winning performance from John Gielgud, and its soundtrack, composed by Nigel Hess was awarded the Television and Radio Industries Club award for best television theme. It was filmed on location in London and Tuscany and first aired in the UK in 1989 on BBC2.

Principal cast:

- John Gielgud – Haverford Downs
- Susan Fleetwood – Molly Pargeter
- Michael Pennington – Hugh Pargeter
- Leslie Phillips – William Fosdyke
- Rosemary Leach – Nancy Leadbetter
- Veronica Lazăr - Baronessa Dulcibene

== Recent editions ==
A new UK paperback edition was published in February 2008.

== DVD release ==
Summer's Lease is available on DVD in the UK. The DVD became available in Australia in 2012.
