= The Glass Virgin =

- Genre: Period drama
- Based on: The Glass Virgin by Catherine Cookson
- Screenplay by: Alan Seymour
- Directed by: Sarah Hellings
- Starring: Emily Mortimer; Brendan Coyle; Nigel Havers
- Music by: Christopher Gunning
- Country of origin: United Kingdom
- Original language: English
- No. of series: 1
- No. of episodes: 3

Production
- Producer: Ray Marshall
- Running time: 180 minutes(three episodes of 60 minutes)
- Production company: Festival Films/World Wide

Original release
- Network: Tyne Tees Television / ITV
- Release: 6 January – 20 January 1995

The Glass Virgin is a British three-part television serial, or long TV movie, first broadcast in 1995, starring Emily Mortimer and Brendan Coyle, directed by Sarah Hellings, based on a novel by Catherine Cookson.

== Production ==
Producer Ray Marshall bought the film rights to several of the period works of Catherine Cookson, beginning in 1989 with The Fifteen Streets, which had been turned into a successful stage play. These productions, sponsored by Tyne Tees Television, were very popular and drew between ten and fourteen million viewers each.

Reviewing The Glass Virgin for The Independent, Jasper Rees commented that it "might have been sponsored by the Northumbrian tourist board, as it gives the impression that the region endlessly basks in sunshine."

== Outline ==
The action takes place in the north of England in the 1870s. Annabella Lagrange (Emily Mortimer), the daughter of upper class parents, finds her life crumbling when she is forced to confront the secret of her birth, kept from her by her mother and degenerate gambler father Edmund Lagrange (Nigel Havers). She runs away from home, then joins Manuel Mendoza (Brendan Coyle), an Irish-Spanish groom of her parents’ estate, who has been loyal to her as a friend and caretaker since she was a child. Together they roam Northumberland looking for work, as Annabella strives to relearn life outside of her upbringing as a lady.

== Cast ==
- Emily Mortimer as Annabella Lagrange
- Brendan Coyle as Manuel Mendoza
- Nigel Havers as Edmund Lagrange
- Sylvia Syms as Lady Constance
- Christine Kavanagh as Rosina Lagrange
- Jean Heywood as Amy
- Jan Graveson as Betty Watford
- Frederick Treves as Great Uncle James
- Samantha Glenn as Young Annabella
- Venetia Barrett as Great Aunt Emma
- Ford Prefect as Michael Fairbairn
- Hywel Berry as Danny Dinning
- Catherine Terris as Mrs Fairbairn
