= The One Game =

- Cover of the 2003 DVD release
- Genre: Thriller
- Created by: Tony Benet
- Written by: John Brown
- Directed by: Mike Vardy
- Starring: Patrick Malahide; Stephen Dillane; Pippa Haywood
- Theme music composer: Nigel Hess
- Country of origin: United Kingdom
- Original language: English
- No. of series: 1
- No. of episodes: 4

Production
- Executive producer: Ted Childs
- Producers: Dierdre Keir; Annie Rees; Kevin Lester
- Running time: 50 minutes
- Production company: Central Independent Television

Original release
- Network: ITV
- Release: 4 June – 25 June 1988

The One Game is a four-part 1988 British television drama serial, produced by Central Independent Television and broadcast on ITV from 4 June to 25 June 1988. Set and filmed in Birmingham, it starred Patrick Malahide, Stephen Dillane (credited as "Stephen Dillon"), Pippa Haywood and Kate McKenzie, and was written by John Brown from a concept by Tony Benet.

== Plot ==
Nick Thorne (Dillane) is a businessman who has achieved success by marketing games. He finds himself drawn into a "reality game" by his former business partner Magnus (Malahide), whom Nick had forced out of their games company after its initial success. Called "The One Game", this sees Nick take on a series of challenges which force him to explore his past, while both his professional and personal life come under threat.

== Production ==
Filming took place in the winter of 1987–8. The production aimed at a surreal rather than a fantasy atmosphere, with an emphasis of only including narrative elements which could occur in real life. Writer John Brown worked an Arthurian theme into his scripts, with the idea that the story was about what would happen if

"Arthur said to Merlin after he'd helped set up the Kingdom, 'Get lost. I don't need you any more.'"

with Nick and Magnus as Arthur and Merlin, respectively; images such as a knife thrown into water, and a woman's hand rising from a lake, were likewise based on the legend of Excalibur. The theme song, "Saylon Dola", and other incidental music by series composer Nigel Hess built on the use of Celtic mythology by incorporating Welsh-sounding gibberish.

== Releases ==
The One Game was released on Region 2 DVD in 2003, in a set which includes a 12-page booklet detailing the series production. The One Game was re-released by Network DVD in 2016.

== Episodes ==
No.	Title	Original release date
1	"Friday"	4 June 1988
2	"Saturday"	11 June 1988
3	"Sunday"	18 June 1988
4	"Monday"	25 June 1988
