= Chameleon (British band) =

British vocal group

- Origin: United Kingdom
- Years active: 1989–present
- Members: Olive Simpson; Lindsay John; Jeremy Taylor; Michael Dore; David Beavan

Chameleon was a vocal group founded in 1989 by Ivor Novello Award-winning composer Nigel Hess, and featuring former Swingle Singers member Olive Simpson (soprano), Lindsay John (alto), Jeremy Taylor (tenor), Michael Dore (baritone) and David Beavan (bass). They were best known for performing the theme tunes to several British television programmes, in particular Summer's Lease, starring John Gielgud and Susan Fleetwood, and for their cover versions of popular folk music.

Chameleon's debut album Saylon Dola won the Music Retailers Association award for "Best MOR Vocal Album" and was re-issued in 2005 to celebrate the group's 15th anniversary. The title track, "Saylon Dola", was covered in 2001 on The Voice by Russell Watson and Máire Brennan, although the song was performed in Irish, translated by Máire Brennan, instead of the original glossolalia.

== Saylon Dola: track listing ==
1. "Saylon Dola"
2. "Long, Long Ago"
3. "Sona Mia Han"
4. "An Affair In Mind"
5. "Shona Tu"
6. "Unay Garm"
7. "Rosheen Du"
8. "Sereg Anna"
9. "The Water Is Wide"
10. "Willow Song"
11. "Summer Night On The Water"
12. "Tu Sherrin So"
13. "She Moved Through the Fair"
14. "Bell Tune"
15. "Lulla Loel"
16. "The Meeting of the Waters"
17. "Carmina Valles"

=== Notes ===
- "Saylon Dola" was used as the theme tune to Central TV's The One Game.
- "Willow Song" was written for the Royal Shakespeare Company's production of Othello.
- "Rosheen Du" was used as the theme tune to Anglia Television's Chimera.
- "Carmina Valles" was used as the theme tune to BBC2's Summer's Lease.
