= Christine Kavanagh =

English actress (born 1957)

- Born: Christine Mary Kavanagh; 24 March 1957 (age 69); Prescot, Lancashire, England
- Occupation: Actress
- Years active: 1984—present
- Spouse: Jack Ellis (divorced)
- Children: 2

Christine Mary Kavanagh (born 24 March 1957) is an English actress.

== Early life ==
Kavanagh was born in Prescot, Lancashire. She was educated in Brussels, and trained as a drama teacher at Bretton Hall College and as an actor at Bristol Old Vic Theatre School.

== Career ==
Kavanagh first appeared in The Onedin Line, followed by a BBC2 Playhouse production before appearing as Nicky in a 1984 episode of Minder. In 1990 she played the lead in the first production (in Scarborough) of Alan Ayckbourn's The Revengers' Comedies, opposite Jon Strickland. In 1985 she appeared in the Doctor Who serial Timelash.

She played Lucy Downes in the Inspector Morse ITV series, in the episode "The Wolvercote Tongue" in 1987, Barbara Hazlitt in a 1989 episode of All Creatures Great and Small, and Dr Alison Wells in the 1991 series Chimera. In 1992 she played the part of Isabel Vandervent in the production of The Blackheath Poisonings produced by ITV. In 1994 she appeared as Penny Winter in eight episodes of Seaforth. The following year she played Rosina Lagrange in three episodes of The Glass Virgin.

In 2009 she starred as Christine O'Connell in Doctors (after originally appearing as June Mobley three years earlier). She has also been a member of the BBC Radio Drama Company for BBC Radio 4. She played Karen Kenworthy in a 2014 episode of Vera. In 2016, she played Ms Birling in Stephen Daltry's production of An Inspector Calls, and played the Doctor's wife, Patience, in the Doctor Who audio drama Cold Fusion.

== Personal life ==
Kavanagh is divorced from Jack Ellis, with whom she has two children. Theo is a member of the alternative rock band Wolf Alice. She founded The Voicehouse, a public-speaking tutoring business.

== Filmography ==
=== Film ===
Year	Title	Role	Notes
2015	National Theatre Live: Man and Superman	Mrs. Whitefield	

=== Television ===
Year	Title	Role	Notes
1980	The Onedin Line	Woman in Hold	Episode: "Vengeance"
1984	Minder	Nicky	Episode: "Rocky Eight and a Half"
1985	Doctor Who	Aram	Serial: "Timelash"
1985	Howards' Way	Louise Silverton	Episode: "Bang"
1987	Bread	Sally	Episode #3.3
1987	London Embassy	Receptionist	Episode: "The Man on the Clapham Omnibus"
1987	Inspector Morse	Lucy Downes	Episode: "The Wolvercote Tongue"
1987, 1988	The Bretts	Diana Lucas	2 episodes
1988	A Very British Coup	Liz	3 episodes
1988–1997	The Ruth Rendell Mysteries	June Symonds / Leila Jasper	3 episodes
1988–1997	The Bill	Various roles	3 episodes
1989	The Saint: The Brazilian Connection	Katrina	Television film
1989	All Creatures Great and Small	Barbara Hazlitt	Episode: "The Call of the Wild"
1989	Screen One	Celia	Episode: "Home Run"
1991	Lovejoy	Renata Van Der Zee	Episode: "Just Desserts"
1991	Chimera	Alison Wells	4 episodes
1991	Casualty	Helen Ferris	Episode: "Allegiance"
1992	Underbelly	Jude Crowe	4 episodes
1992	Boon	Mona Cameron	Episode: "Minder"
1992	The Blackheath Poisonings	Isabel Collard	3 episodes
1993	Drop the Dead Donkey	Estelle	Episode: "Helen'll Fix It"
1993	All in the Game	Lindy Barge	6 episodes
1993	Between the Lines	Joanna Gould	Episode: "Big Boys' Rules: Part I"
1994	Frank Stubbs Promotes	Marcia	Episode: "Mr. Chairman"
1994	Seaforth	Penny Winter	8 episodes
1995	The Glass Virgin	Rosina Lagrange	3 episodes
1995	Pigeon Summer	Lina Dyer	Miniseries
1995	Agony Again	Pamela	Episode: "Breaking Point"
1998	Equinox	Helen Parker	Episode: "The King of Chaos"
1998	Jonathan Creek	Lady Theresa Cutler	Episode: "The Scented Room"
2000	In His Life: The John Lennon Story	Julia Lennon	Television film
2000	The Sleeper	Sheena	Television film
2001	McCready and Daughter	Denise Bellini	Episode: "Pasta La Vista"
2002	Manchild	Christine	2 episodes
2003	Holby City	Jenny Warren	Episode: "A Tear in My Eye"
2003	Sweet Medicine	Sam Lawrence	Episode #1.1
2003	Heartbeat	Joyce Carswell	Episode: "A Family Affair"
2004	New Tricks	Christine Hardy	Episode: "Painting on Loan"
2004	Coming Up	Jan	Episode: "Girls and Girls"
2004	Sherlock Holmes and the Case of the Silk Stocking	Lady Helhoughton	Television film
2005	The Inspector Lynley Mysteries	Pippa Featherstonehaugh	Episode: "The Seed of Cunning"
2006	Midsomer Murders	Margaret Florian	Episode: "Down Among the Dead Men"
2006–2009	Doctors	Christine O'Connell / June Mobley	11 episodes
2007	A Room with a View	Mrs. Vyse	Television film
2010	Material Girl	Tallulah	Episode #1.4
2012	Titanic	Marian Thayer	2 episodes
2013	Great Night Out	Ginny	Episode #1.5
2014	Vera	Karen Kenworthy	Episode: "Protected"
2023	The Diplomat	Gwen Hempill	2 episodes
