= London Chamber Orchestra =

British chamber orchestra

- Short name: LCO
- Founded: 1921
- Disbanded: 2025
- Concert hall: Cadogan Hall
- Principal conductor: Christopher Warren-Green
- Website: www.lco.co.uk

The London Chamber Orchestra (LCO) was a British chamber orchestra based in London. LCO performed at various concert halls across London and toured Asia, the UK, Europe and the United States. The orchestra gave its last performance in February 2024 and officially closed in February 2025.

== History ==
The name London Chamber Orchestra was first used in 1921 by the English conductor, organist, pianist and composer Anthony Bernard in December 1921. He conducted the first LCO performance, in the salon of No. 4 St James's Square, on 11 May 1921although the same players performed together as early as 1920 under a different name. Anthony Bernard continued to manage the LCO through the second world war and died on 6 April 1963 aged 72. The title of LCO passed to his wife Mary Bernard on his death, who continued to profit from its use by a variety of management companies. By 1988 Christopher Warren-Green was appointed as musical director. His brother, Nigel Warren Green, became manager. The brothers' time running the orchestra came to a close after racking up large debts, and the company was dissolved with musicians' fees unpaid. A new company was soon set up under the LCO name with Christopher Warren-Green again as musical director and Step Parikian and Jonathan Williams as directors.

Queen Camilla became LCO's patron in 2010 while she was Duchess of Cornwall. The London Chamber Orchestra performed at the wedding of Prince William and Catherine Middleton at Westminster Abbey on 29 April 2011. The special programme of music was conducted by Christopher Warren-Green. Music played at the royal wedding was recorded and released digitally by Decca Records on 5 May 2011.

== Performances and education work ==
The LCO gave more than 100 UK premieres, including works by Malcolm Arnold, Manuel de Falla, Gabriel Fauré, Leoš Janáček, Maurice Ravel, Ralph Vaughan Williams, Igor Stravinsky, and, most recently, Graham Fitkin and James Francis Brown. In 2006 the LCO premiered Sir Peter Maxwell Davies's The Golden Rule, written to mark Queen Elizabeth's 80th birthday.

The orchestra also ran an education and outreach programme called Music Junction.

== Later direction and closure ==
Between 2020 and 2021 ownership of the orchestra was transferred from Christopher Warren-Green to Martin Childs, a businessman and amateur musician. Childs installed fellow horn player Jocelyn Lightfoot as CEO and appointed himself to The London Chamber Orchestra Trust's board of trustees. Both Childs and Lightfoot were criticised for lacking the necessary experience for their roles.

In February 2024, The Observer reported that the LCO had failed to pay their players over a five-month period after musicians walked out of a concert at London's Cadogan Hall – LCO's last ever performance. Days after the report, six of the seven board members of the orchestra's trust resigned, leaving Martin Childs as the sole trustee. A month later CEO Jocelyn Lightfoot resigned and, according to the trust's annual report, 'all activities and management' of the orchestra were suspended. The orchestra was officially dissolved on 18 February 2025, potentially owing at least £570,000.

== Discography ==
- Mozart: Symphony No. 29 and concertos
- Vivaldi: The Four Seasons
- String Serenades: Tchaikovsky, Elgar, Dvořák, Vaughan Williams, Josef Suk
- Minimalist: Philip Glass, John Adams, Steve Reich, Dave Heath
- The Harder They Fall (original score) (with Jeymes Samuel)

The LCO had been recorded by Virgin Records and BMG and has been broadcast by BBC Radio 3 and ITV.

J.S. Bach Concerto in E Major (3 discs HMV D.B. 9370-9372) Gioconda De Vito (Violin) Geraint Jones (Harpsichord) conducted by Anthony Bernard
