= Emily Mortimer =

British actress (born 1971)

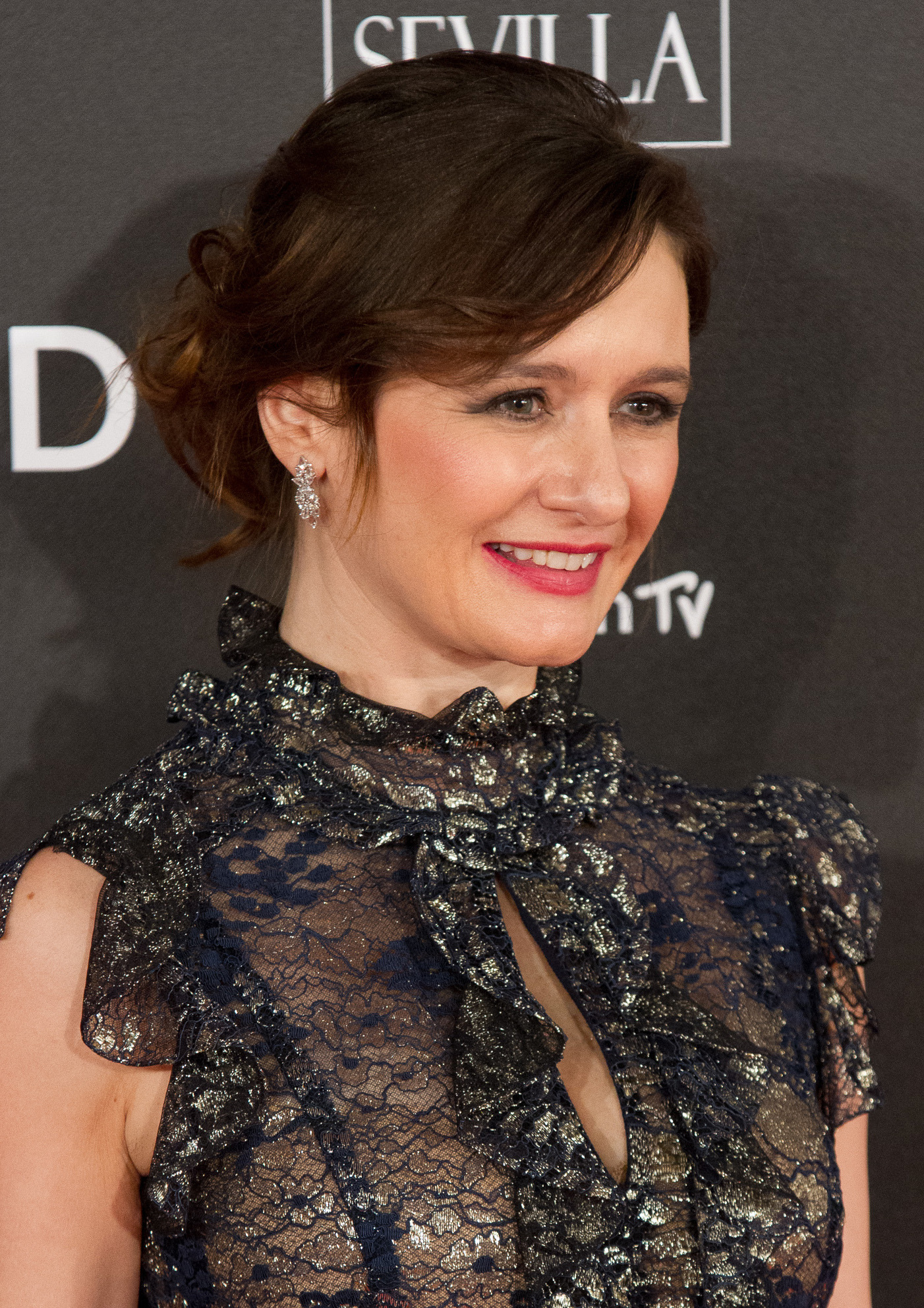
- Mortimer at the 32nd Goya Awards in 2018
- Born: Emily Kathleen Anne Mortimer; 6 October 1971 (age 54); London, England
- Citizenship: United Kingdom; United States
- Education: Lincoln College, Oxford
- Occupations: Actress; director; screenwriter
- Years active: 1994–present
- Works: Full list
- Spouse: Alessandro Nivola (m. 2003)
- Children: 2, including Sam Nivola
- Father: John Mortimer
- Relatives: Jeremy Mortimer (half-brother)

Emily Kathleen Anne Mortimer (born 6 October 1971) is an English actress and filmmaker. She began acting in stage productions and has since appeared in several film and television roles. In 2003, she won an Independent Spirit Award for her performance in Lovely and Amazing. She is also known for playing Mackenzie McHale in the HBO series The Newsroom (2012–2014). She co-created and co-wrote the series Doll & Em (2014–2015) and wrote and directed the miniseries The Pursuit of Love (2021), the latter of which earned her a nomination for the British Academy Television Award for Best Supporting Actress.

She provided the voice of Sophie in the English-language version of Howl's Moving Castle (2004), and starred in Scream 3 (2000), Match Point (2005), The Pink Panther (2006), The Pink Panther 2 (2009), Lars and the Real Girl (2007), Chaos Theory (2008), Harry Brown (2009), Shutter Island (2010), Cars 2 (2011), Hugo (2011), Mary Poppins Returns (2018), and Relic (2020).

== Early life and education ==
Mortimer was born on 6 October 1971 in Hammersmith, London, to dramatist and barrister Sir John Mortimer, and his second wife, Penelope (née Gollop). She has a younger sister, Rosie; two older half-siblings, Sally Silverman and Jeremy, from her father's first marriage to author Penelope Fletcher; and a half-brother, Ross Bentley, from her father's relationship with actress Wendy Craig.

Mortimer studied at St Paul's Girls' School in west London where she appeared in several pupil productions. She went on to the University of Oxford, where she read Russian at Lincoln College where she performed in several plays and spent two terms at the Moscow Art Theatre School, studying acting. Before becoming an actress, she wrote a column for The Daily Telegraph and was screenwriter for an adaptation of Lorna Sage's memoir Bad Blood.

== Career ==
=== 1995–2008: Early work and recognition ===
Mortimer performed in several plays while studying at the University of Oxford. While acting in a student production, she was spotted by a producer who later cast her as the lead in a television adaptation of Catherine Cookson's The Glass Virgin (1995). Subsequent television roles included Sharpe's Sword (1995) and Coming Home (1998). She followed this with the 1996 television film Lord of Misrule, directed by Guy Jenkin and filmed in Fowey, Cornwall.

In 1996, Mortimer appeared as drug addict Fran in the first series of Silent Witness. In the same year, she appeared in her first feature film opposite Val Kilmer in The Ghost and the Darkness, and in the coming-of-age story The Last of the High Kings. 1997 saw Mortimer cast as the central character of Katherine Lacey in the pilot episode of Midsomer Murders. In 1998 she appeared as Kat Ashley in Elizabeth, and played Miss Flynn in the television mini series Cider with Rosie, which was adapted for television by her father. In 1999, she played three roles: she was the "Perfect Girl" dropped by Hugh Grant in Notting Hill; Esther in the television miniseries Noah's Ark, and actress Angelina in Scream 3.

In 2000, Mortimer was cast as Katherine in Kenneth Branagh's musical adaptation of Love's Labour's Lost, where she met actor and future husband Alessandro Nivola. She took on her biggest role in an American film to date, playing opposite Bruce Willis in Disney's The Kid. A year later, she played aspiring actress Elizabeth in Lovely & Amazing, a comedy about the relationship between a mother and her three daughters. Mortimer said of the role, "It was a wonderful experience as an actor to have that opportunity [...] You hear this terrifying phrase, 'being in the moment.' I have no doubt that I was in that moment. [Elizabeth] was exposed and ridiculous and brave." Mortimer won an Independent Spirit Award for Best Supporting Actress for her role. In 2002, she had a major part as the assassin in The 51st State (also known as Formula 51), starring opposite Samuel L. Jackson and Robert Carlyle. The film was a critical and commercial failure.

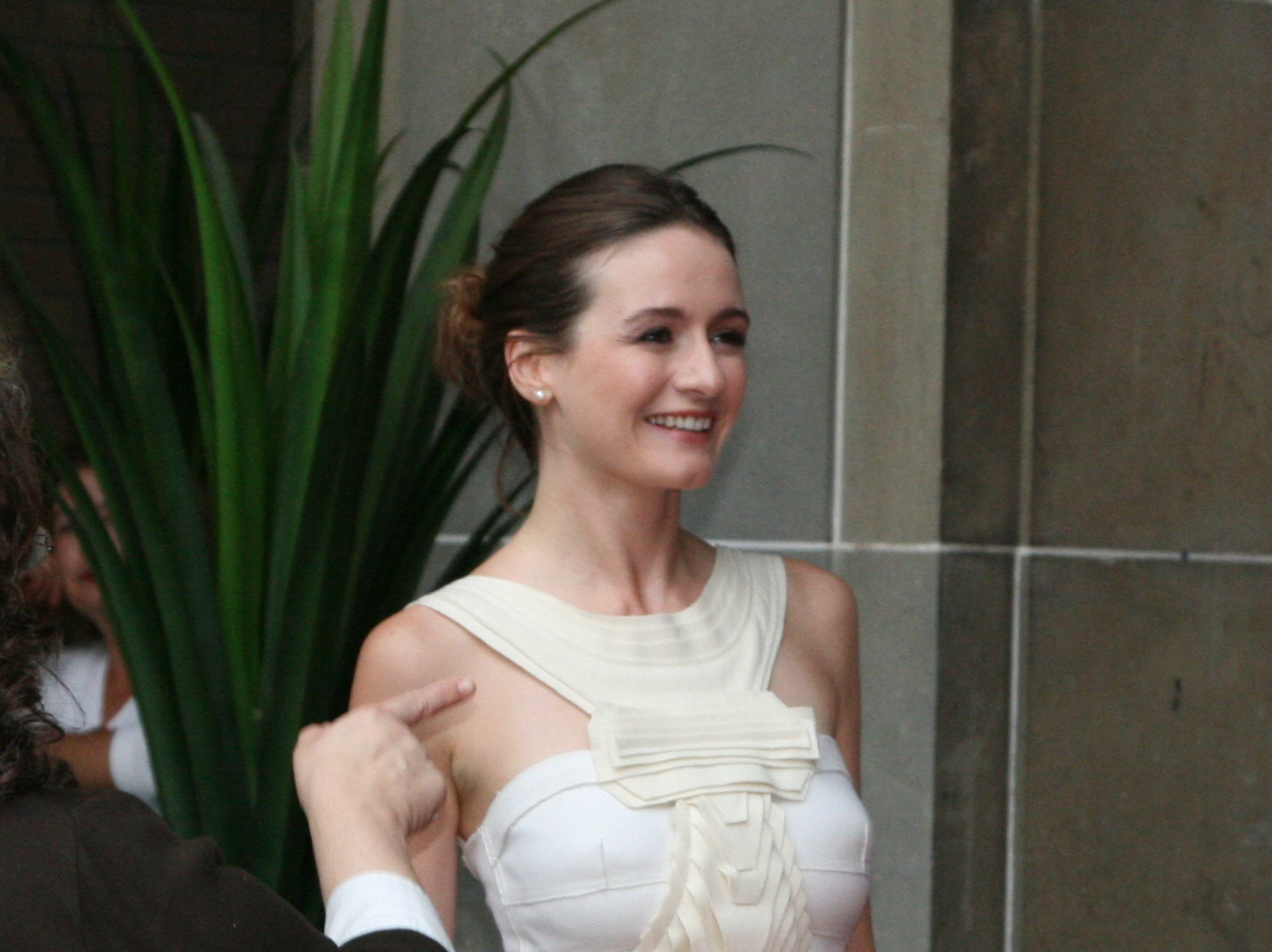
Mortimer attending the Toronto International Film Festival premiere of The Girl in the Park in September 2007

In 2003, Mortimer appeared in Stephen Fry's British drama Bright Young Things, based on the 1930 novel Vile Bodies by Evelyn Waugh. It is about young and carefree London aristocrats and bohemians, set in the interwar period. Playing fiancée Nina Blount, Mortimer was described as "a character who gives Peter O'Toole a marvelous few minutes of playing dottiness to the hilt", by Washington Post's Stephen Hunter. Her last release of 2003 was Young Adam, in which she plays the girlfriend of a nihilistic barge worker (Ewan McGregor). Based on the novel of the same title, Mortimer's role in Young Adam garnered her acclaim; Evening Standard's critic wrote, "In a performance of naked courage, Emily Mortimer shows that she is prepared to go to extreme lengths of masochism in her depiction of a woman undone by love". Sight & Sound magazine thought the cast performances were "edgy", and Mortimer made the most out of an underwritten role. She also had a supporting part in the romantic drama The Sleeping Dictionary (2003).

In 2004, Mortimer played the lead role in the drama Dear Frankie, about a young mother whose love for her son prompts her to plan a deception to protect him from the truth about his father. Her performance gained positive reviews; San Francisco Chronicle wrote, "an unforgettable performance from Mortimer [...] a leading lady". Matthew Leyland of the BBC gave the film 3 out of 5 stars, and was impressed with Mortimer's performance, which was played with "heartfelt conviction". In an interview with critic Roger Ebert, Mortimer said, "I seem to find characters who are held back and guarded, physically and mentally. It's a relief after the film is over. [...] But when I'm acting, it's good to have something to play against, boundaries to break."

Mortimer also voiced young Sophie in the English-dubbed version of 2004's Howl's Moving Castle. In 2005, she played Chloe Wilton, the oblivious spouse of Jonathan Rhys Meyers's adulterer in Woody Allen's Match Point. The film premiered at the Cannes Film Festival, and co-starred Scarlett Johansson and Matthew Goode. Writing for The Guardian, Peter Bradshaw opined that Mortimer's performance was "perfectly plausible", and CNN's critic complimented the entire cast. During the film's theatrical run, it earned $85 million. She appeared in The Pink Panther (2006) as the "adorable" secretary Nicole Durant.

In 2007, she had a role in the comedy drama Lars and the Real Girl as Karin, the supportive sister-in-law of Ryan Gosling's title character. The film received generally positive reviews; Deborah Ross of The Spectator thought Mortimer played her character well despite the film's repetitive comedic moments. Next in 2008, Mortimer starred opposite Ryan Reynolds in the comedy Chaos Theory. Critical reception was mostly mixed, and Ruthe Stein of San Francisco Chronicle thought Mortimer and Reynolds lacked chemistry. The psychological thriller Transsiberian (2008), directed by Brad Anderson, saw Mortimer cast as Jessie. She co-stars with Woody Harrelson, and they portray a couple who befriend a pair of mysterious travellers. The film premiered at the 2008 Sundance Film Festival to a positive response; Variety magazine's critic thought Mortimer's character was well-developed, and it was "a very flavorful performance as a reformed bad girl".

A year later, she was cast in David Mamet's martial arts drama Redbelt, playing attorney Laura Black. The film gained fair reviews, and The Telegraph critic wrote, "Emily Mortimer is impressive as a jittery, unlikable attorney". In 2009, Mortimer reprised her role as Nicole Durant in The Pink Panther 2; the film was panned by critics. In the last three episodes of the first season of 30 Rock, she played Phoebe, the mysterious love interest of Alec Baldwin's character, Jack Donaghy.

=== 2009–2019: Career progression in film ===
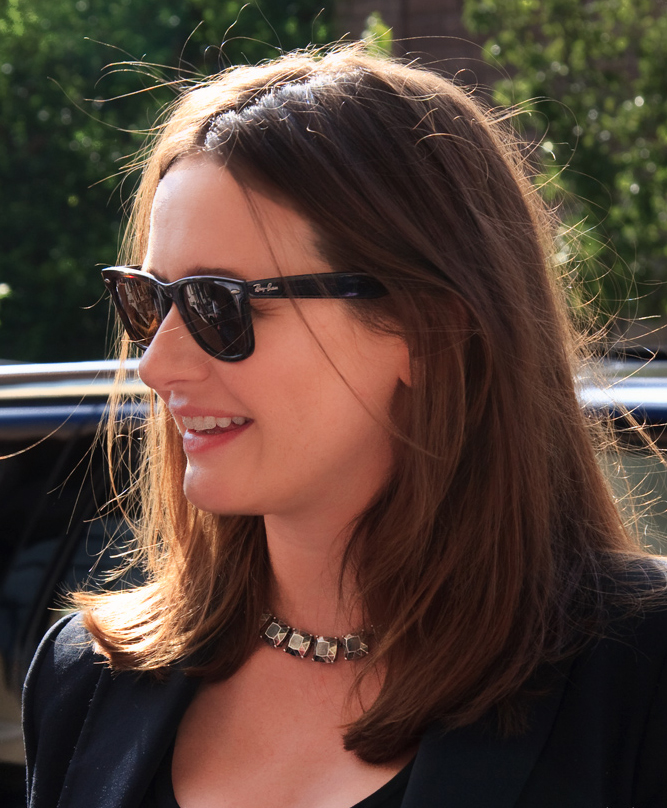
Mortimer at the 2009 Toronto International Film Festival

Mortimer appeared in Daniel Barber's first film, Harry Brown (2009), as police detective Alice Frampton. The plot follows widowed veteran (Michael Caine), who takes the law into his own hands when teenage violence ruins his community. Mortimer chose the role because "It felt like unfamiliar territory for me which is always a challenge and interesting [...] the script is very gripping and brilliantly written [...] getting to work with Michael, and then just the character being in some ways both the opposite and the same as Michael's character." To prepare for the role, she spent time with a real female detective, and learnt about police interrogation techniques. Critic Claudia Puig writing for USA Today thought her performance was "caring and savvy", despite the film's "senseless violence". Betsy Sharkey of Los Angeles Times wrote of Mortimer's performance: "Her clinical coolness plays well off of Caine's controlled heat."

Mortimer played an aspiring actress opposite Andy García in City Island (2009). Although the film's reception was warm, her role in City Island was noted by two critics as "vague" and weak. She appeared as Rachel Solando in Martin Scorsese's 2010 thriller Shutter Island. Several critics thought Shutter Island was unexciting, and that Mortimer and her fellow actors were not utilised to their full potential. The film found moderate success at the box office, grossing $294 million from a budget of $80 million. She portrayed American educator Leonie Gilmour in the biographical drama Leonie (2010). Of her performance, The Hollywood Reporter opined that it was a "superb portrayal", which showcased her acting range.

In 2011, she had a role in Our Idiot Brother as Liz, the sister of Paul Rudd's titular character. In that same year, Mortimer appeared in Scorsese's Hugo, an adaptation of Brian Selznick's book, The Invention of Hugo Cabret. Hugo won five Academy Awards from eleven nominations, but was a box office disappointment. Also in 2011, she started work with screenwriter and producer Aaron Sorkin, playing Mackenzie McHale in HBO's The Newsroom. Although the first season of the series gained a mixed reception, the later seasons fared better. Several critics praised Mortimer's acting abilities in season one, but they took issue with her character's writing. In January 2013, it was announced that Mortimer would be co-creating and starring in the comedy series Doll & Em for Sky Living, along with her longtime friend, actress and comedian Dolly Wells.

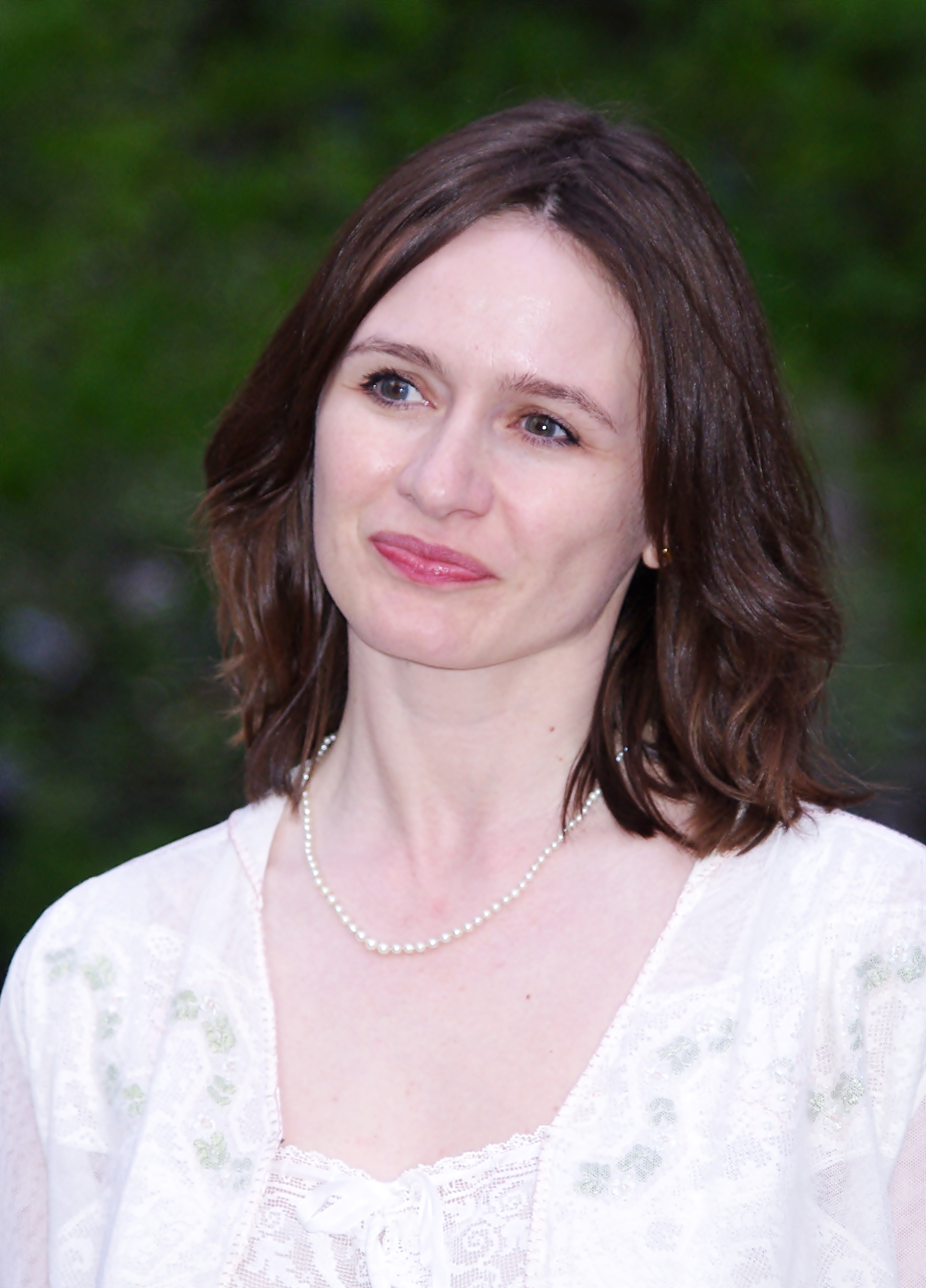
Mortimer at the 2011 Tribeca Film Festival

Next, Mortimer starred in the drama The Sense of an Ending (2017), based on the novel of the same title by Julian Barnes. Playing the mother Sarah Ford, Mortimer garnered praise for her lively performance, while one critic thought she was miscast. In that same year, she portrayed the pregnant Jinny in The Party; the film premiered at the 67th Berlin International Film Festival, and was favourably received. Mortimer co-starred with Patricia Clarkson and Bill Nighy in the drama The Bookshop. Adapted from the 1978 novel of the same title by Penelope Fitzgerald, Mortimer played Florence Green, who opens a bookshop despite local opposition. Writing for Chicago Reader, Andrea Gronvall noted, "The ever-winsome Emily Mortimer glows as a struggling widow", and Variety magazine opined that it was "A fine, sensitive leading turn" for the actor. The Bookshop grossed $12 million worldwide.

In the small-scale feature, Write When You Get Work (2018), Mortimer played a member of the elite class. A family drama, about a man with Alzheimer's, Head Full of Honey (2018), was Mortimer's next release. She played the wife of Matt Dillon's character. The Los Angeles Times gave the film a negative review, and thought Mortimer and the cast were "all over the place". She then joined the cast of Mary Poppins Returns, a 2018 musical fantasy directed by Rob Marshall. It is loosely based on the book series Mary Poppins by P. L. Travers. The film was a box office hit, and Christopher Orr of The Atlantic magazine praised Mortimer's "charming" performance.

Mortimer returned to the screen in 2019 with Good Posture. It co-stars Grace Van Patten as Lilian, a young woman who moves in with her father's friend, a reclusive novelist called Julia Price (Mortimer). Of her character, she said, "I wish I had just one per cent of Julia's frostiness in my own life. I really enjoyed being that person, feeling what it's like to be intimidating." The film was made by Mortimer's friend, Dolly Wells, in her directorial debut. The actor's performance earned praise, but several critics were disappointed with her small amount of screen time. Next, she appeared in Greg Kinnear's comedy Phil; it was negatively received by critics. In the horror film Mary, Mortimer starred opposite Gary Oldman. The film is about a family in isolated waters and the ship they bought which has terrifying secrets. Mary was panned by critics, and the Los Angeles Times thought the actors talents were wasted.

=== 2020–present ===
In 2020, Mortimer starred in the horror film Relic with co-stars Robyn Nevin and Bella Heathcote. The Chicago Sun-Times called Mortimer "excellent" in her portrayal of a workaholic mother. That same year, Mortimer played Sharon in the Quibi's science fiction series Don't Look Deeper. In 2021, Mortimer wrote, directed, and starred in the miniseries The Pursuit of Love, which earned her a BAFTA TV nomination for Best Supporting Actress. Mortimer replaced Sally Hawkins, who had played Mrs. Brown in previous Paddington films, for Paddington in Peru (2024). In 2025 she played Cressida Dick in Suspect: The Shooting of Jean Charles de Menezes.

== Personal life ==
In 2000, Mortimer met American actor Alessandro Nivola while both were starring in Love's Labour's Lost. They married in the village of Turville in the Chilterns, Buckinghamshire, on 3 January 2003. Mortimer gave birth to their son Sam Nivola on 26 September 2003, and their daughter in 2010. Previously based in Notting Hill, they later moved to Boerum Hill, Brooklyn. Mortimer became an American citizen in 2010.

Speaking to The Guardian in 2010, Mortimer said that she 'sometimes wishes Russian were more a part of her life', and that she 'adores all things Russian and regrets that her association with Russia has been limited to "a little academic foray". At this time, Mortimer said she was thinking about writing a novella about Russian and Soviet stage actress Olga Knipper, wife of Anton Chekhov.

== Awards and nominations ==
Year	Association	Category	Work	Result
2003	Chicago Film Critics Association	Best Supporting Actress	Lovely & Amazing	Nominated
2003	Independent Spirit Awards	Best Supporting Female	Lovely & Amazing	Won
2003	Satellite Awards	Best Performance by an Actress in a Supporting Role, Comedy or Musical	Lovely & Amazing	Nominated
2004	Empire Awards	Best British Actress	Young Adam	Nominated
2004	London Film Critics' Circle	British Supporting Actress of the Year	Young Adam	Nominated
2005	London Film Critics' Circle	British Actress of the Year	Dear Frankie	Nominated
2007	Detroit Film Critics Society	Best Supporting Actress	Lars and the Real Girl	Nominated
2007	Satellite Awards	Best Actress in a Motion Picture, Comedy or Musical	Lars and the Real Girl	Nominated
2009	Saturn Awards	Best Actress	Transsiberian	Nominated
2018	Goya Awards	Best Actress	The Bookshop	Nominated
2022	British Academy Television Awards	Best Supporting Actress	The Pursuit of Love	Nominated
