= The Pursuit of Love (TV series) =

2021 British television miniseries

- Genre: Romantic drama
- Based on: The Pursuit of Love by Nancy Mitford
- Written by: Emily Mortimer
- Directed by: Emily Mortimer
- Starring: Lily James; Andrew Scott; Emily Beecham; Dominic West; Dolly Wells; John Heffernan; Beattie Edmondson; Assaad Bouab; Shazad Latif; Freddie Fox; Emily Mortimer
- Narrated by: Emily Beecham
- Country of origin: United Kingdom
- Original language: English
- No. of episodes: 3

Production
- Cinematography: Zac Nicholson
- Production companies: Moonage Pictures; Open Book; Amazon Studios

Original release
- Network: BBC One
- Release: 9 May – 23 May 2021

The Pursuit of Love is a British three-part television romantic drama written and directed by Emily Mortimer. It is based on the 1945 novel of the same name by Nancy Mitford, which had previously been adapted as Love in a Cold Climate (1980) and Love in a Cold Climate (2001). It premiered on 9 May 2021 on BBC One.

== Premise ==
Two cousins navigate their lives and friendship, as they seek different things in life.

== Cast and characters ==
- Emily Beecham as Fanny Logan
- Lily James as The Honourable (Note: Lord Alconleigh is a Baron, so his children are all styled "The Honourable" abbreviated as "The Hon". Hence their references to their private club, "the Hons" and attendant jokes.) Linda Radlett, Fanny's cousin
- Dominic West as Matthew Radlett, Lord Alconleigh, Linda's father
- Dolly Wells as Sadie Radlett, Lady Alconleigh, Linda's mother
- Beattie Edmondson as The Honourable Louisa Radlett, Linda's older sister
- Annabel Mullion as Aunt Emily, Fanny's de facto mother
- Emily Mortimer as The Bolter, Fanny's real mother and Emily and Sadie's younger sister
- John Heffernan as Davey, Aunt Emily's fiancé
- Andrew Scott as Lord Merlin
- Freddie Fox as Tony Kroesig
- Shazad Latif as Alfred Wyncham/Wincham (Note: Although the end credits spell the character's name with an "i", it appears on screen spelled with a "y" in the cursive text that is displayed over the freeze frame when Fanny bumps into him.)
- James Frecheville as Christian Talbot
- Assaad Bouab as Fabrice de Sauveterre
- Georgina Morgan as young Fanny
- Swift & Scarlet as Lord Merlin's whippets

== Episodes ==
No.	Title	Directed by	Written by	Original release date	U.K. viewers (millions)
1	"Episode 1"	Emily Mortimer	Emily Mortimer	9 May 2021	N/A
1941. Linda Radlett is sunbathing—very pregnant and naked save for a fur coat—on the roof of her Chelsea flat. She is bombed out, and on the drive to the Radlett's baronial estate, her devoted cousin Fanny reminisces about her own visits there, and the misadventures of Linda: “a wild and nervous creature, full of passion and longing”. Fanny was raised by her aunt Emily after her mother ran off (repeat performances earned her the name "The Bolter"). Fanny has been educated at school, but Linda has not. Lord Alconleigh loathes educated women, who cannot ride and use words like “mantelpiece”. At 17, Fanny and Linda long for life to begin. Aunt Emily brings her fiancé, Capt. “Davey” Warbeck, home for Christmas; Fanny discovers them asleep in bed together. Linda is smitten by a neighbour, Lord Merlin, a notoriously eccentric artist, who tells her that she needs educating. Time passes, and she falls for Tony Kroesig, the egotistical son of the Governor of the Bank of England. Fanny, Davey and Merlin are against it, and Tony's ancient German ancestry infuriates Lord Alconleigh, but they do marry. At the wedding reception, Fanny collides auspiciously with Alfred Wynchham—and comforts an inauspiciously shaking Linda.
2	"Episode 2"	Emily Mortimer	Emily Mortimer	16 May 2021	N/A
Linda has married Tony and bears their child, Moira. Fanny marries Alfred, who is an Oxford scholar. She is also expecting a child. Linda has a difficult delivery and postpartum depression, and does not bond with Moira. Years pass. Linda spends time partying at night with the "Chatters", a group that includes Lord Merlin. Her friendship with Fanny becomes erratic, although she insists that she would be lost without her. At a lunch at her in-laws, Linda meets Christian Talbot, a communist. She divorces Tony, who marries his mistress, Pixie. Linda moves to a Chelsea flat provided by Lord Merlin, who despairs over her love for Christian or anybody appearing in her life. She works for a communist bookstore, and when her younger brother enlists to fight in the Spanish Civil War, she joins Christian there in humanitarian work with refugees. Fanny is upset at Linda's departure: She feels abandoned: her married life confines her to the duties of motherhood, while her husband engages in intellectual pursuits. In Spain, Christian cheats on Linda with another refugee worker, Lavender. Linda finds out and, despairing, starts a return journey to London. In transit through Paris, she meets Fabrice de Sauveterre, who offers her a room for the night.
3	"Episode 3"	Emily Mortimer	Emily Mortimer	23 May 2021	N/A
Linda decides to stay in Paris with Fabrice de Sauveterre, who makes her his mistress and showers her with gifts. She says she is happy, but when Lord Merlin, Fanny and her uncle Davey come to Paris, Merlin remarks she has a haunted sadness. She returns to London as the war begins. Fabrice briefly joins her and she is pregnant. After her London house is bombed, she leaves for the family home. She gives birth, but dies as a result. Fanny believes that Linda died happy. The closing scene is a tea party in the garden with Fanny, her mother, and her aunt, in which they discuss their hope that in the future, women will not be limited to be a 'fixer' or a 'bolter'.

== Production ==
It was announced in December 2019 that the BBC had commissioned the series, an adaptation of the 1945 Nancy Mitford novel. Emily Mortimer was announced as writer and director of the series, with Lily James starring.

Filming on the series had initially begun in the spring of 2020, but had to be postponed due to the COVID-19 pandemic. It would resume in July in Bristol and Bath, Somerset, with the cast additions of Andrew Scott, Emily Beecham, Dominic West, Dolly Wells, Beattie Edmondson, Assaad Bouab, Shazad Latif and Freddie Fox, and Amazon Studios joining the project as a co-producer.

== Reception ==
The series received positive reviews from critics in the UK press. In the Radio Times, Eleanor Bley Griffiths wrote "[...]I do know that each episode was a joy and a pleasure to watch – and when it comes to Sunday night TV, you can't ask for more than that."

For The Daily Telegraph, Anita Singh praised the show overall but criticised the casting of James: "It is enjoyable, and the first episode is quite the best. But its leading lady is all wrong, despite looking the part" while Ed Cumming in The Independent was more complimentary about her: "Free to pout and strut and grumble like a teenager, James relaxes more into her role than she did on her last outing, as a lovestruck archaeologist in The Dig."

Lucy Mangan in The Guardian gave the first episode the maximum five stars, stating "The insistent intertwining of the pain with the laughter, instead of flattening the tale into a Wodehouse-with-women yarn, makes this adaptation feel like a classic in its own right. It is a treat for all. Mitfordians – please, do give it a chance." The Financial Times also gave a generally positive review to the show.

== Soundtrack ==
The series' soundtrack contains many British and US acts and French singers. The first episode prominently includes T. Rex's song "Dandy in the Underworld" in the ballroom sequence which introduces the character of Lord Merlin, played by Andrew Scott.

1. Bryan Ferry – "The In Crowd"
2. Le Tigre – "Deceptacon"
3. New Order – "Ceremony"
4. T. Rex – "Dandy in the Underworld"
5. Cat Power – "Sea of Love"
6. Sleater-Kinney – "Modern Girl"
7. Marianne Faithfull – "Give My Love to London"
8. Joan Armatrading – "Woncha Come On Home"
9. Karen Dalton – "Are you Leaving for the Country"
10. The Meters – "Cissy Strut"
11. Nina Simone – "Be My Husband"
12. John Cale – "Paris 1919"
13. Maria Arnal – "A La Vida"
14. Blossom Dearie – "Plus Je t'embrasse"
15. Juliette Greco – "Déshabillez-moi"
16. Yves Montand – "Rue St Vincent"
17. Marino Marini – "Guaglione"
18. The Who – "Blue, Red and Grey"
