= Concerto for Piano and Orchestra (Hess) =

Composition by Nigel Hess

The Concerto for Piano and Orchestra is a work by Nigel Hess, first performed in 2007. It was commissioned by HRH Charles, Prince of Wales (later King Charles III), in memory of his late grandmother Queen Elizabeth The Queen Mother. Prior to this, Hess was best known as a composer of film and television scores.

The concerto was first performed by Lang Lang, who also recorded the work, in July 2007, at a concert at The Church of St James the Great, Castle Acre, Norfolk, organised by the charity Music in Country Churches. It was nominated for a Classical Brit Award. It entered the Classic FM Top 300 in 2008 and fell out of the chart in 2011, returning in 2012 at no. 221.

== Movements ==
There are three movements:

1. The Smile
2. The Love
3. The Duty
