= Chaos Theory (film) =

- Theatrical release poster
- Directed by: Marcos Siega
- Written by: Daniel Taplitz
- Produced by: Barbara Kelly; Frederic Golchan; Erica Westheimer
- Starring: Ryan Reynolds; Stuart Townsend; Emily Mortimer; Sarah Chalke; Mike Erwin
- Cinematography: Ramsey Nickell
- Edited by: Nicholas Erasmus
- Music by: Gilad Benamram
- Production companies: Castle Rock Entertainment; Lone Star Film Group; Frederic Golchan Productions
- Distributed by: Warner Bros. Pictures
- Release date: April 11, 2008
- Running time: 87 minutes
- Country: United States
- Language: English
- Box office: $338,440

Chaos Theory is a 2008 American comedy drama film starring Ryan Reynolds, Emily Mortimer, and Stuart Townsend. The film was directed by Marcos Siega, written by Daniel Taplitz and was shot in Coquitlam and Squamish, British Columbia.

Obsessively organized efficiency expert Frank Allen tells his future son-in-law Ed how his life had unraveled in unexpected ways when he was forced to learn to forgive his wife's transgression, in response to his cold feet.

The film performed poorly in theaters and was not positively reviewed by critics.

== Plot ==
The morning of his wedding to Jesse, Ed is having doubts, having learned his fiancée had slept with one of his friends while on a break from him. Cornered before he can escape by Jesse's father Frank, he begins describing the ups and downs of his relationship with Jesse's mother Susan.

Years earlier, both Frank and Buddy loved Susan. On New Year's Eve, she resolves to choose a husband that night, and chooses Frank. Eight years later, they are happily married and their daughter Jesse is seven. A professional lecturer on time management, Frank perfectly maximizes his efficiency through scheduling and planning his life down to the minute.

On the morning of an important seminar, Susan changes their clocks ten minutes, so Frank can run an errand for her. However, she moves them back rather than forward. He misses the ferry, arriving late to his lecture, which could damage his career. Buddy consoles him in the hotel bar and wants him to be his wingman, but he declines.

Chatting with Paula from his lecture, she requests to use his hotel room bathroom supposedly to avoid the public restroom, but then hits on him. Susan calls but Frank ends the call abruptly when Paula makes a noise, and hurries out to get home. When Susan calls back Paula answers, simply telling her that Frank is not there.

While driving home through the night, Frank nearly crashes with the pregnant Nancy. As she is in labor, he drives her to the hospital. When Frank is asked to fill out some forms, he mistakenly puts down his own information before resuming his trip home. Nancy abandons the baby (having told Frank earlier that she did not want it) so the nurse calls the number on her forms to reach her. Susan answers the phone, and learns about the baby.

Susan immediately assumes Frank has been leading a double life, between the woman in his hotel room and this baby. When he arrives home, she refuses to listen to him and throws him out of the house. Over the next few weeks Susan refuses to speak to Frank, but does allow him to see Jesse after school.

Undergoing a paternity test to prove the baby is not his, Frank is told he has Klinefelter's syndrome, so sterile from birth. Incredulous at first, he finally realizes he cannot even be Jesse's dad.

Meanwhile, Nancy, having returned for her child, stops by Frank's to thank him for his kindness. Finding only Susan at home, Nancy soon clears up the misunderstanding. Susan tries to call Frank to ask him to come home, but he is utterly devastated by the idea of Susan's infidelity and now refuses to take her calls. He eventually confides in Buddy that he is not Jesse's biological father, to explain why he has not gone back to Susan.

Buddy realizes he must be Jesse's dad, from their one-night stand the night before Susan and Frank's engagement. Believing Frank is out of the picture, he reveals Frank's infertility to Susan and attempts to woo her with roses, to no avail.

After advocating for living on whim at his own time management lecture, Frank decides to base his life decisions on shuffling three index cards with written options and randomly choosing one. After the lecture, finding Paula again, he invites her to his room. However, nothing happens, as he realizes he still loves Susan.

Returning home to reconcile, before Susan can tell Frank who is Jesse's father, she goes upstairs to comfort Jesse over a nightmare. He sees the roses Buddy sent her, realizing the truth. Frank leaves, plotting to kill Buddy.

Luring Buddy into a boat which Frank takes into the middle of the lake, they both end up falling in. Buddy saves Frank and they make it to shore. On the walk back, Buddy discloses Susan loves Frank, not him. The couple reconcile, becoming a family again.

Back in present-day, Ed realizes that he does love Jesse, so the wedding goes forward. Buddy escorts Susan to her seat, and as father of the bride, Frank walks Jesse down the aisle.

== Cast ==
- Ryan Reynolds as Frank Allen
- Emily Mortimer as Susan Allen
- Stuart Townsend as Buddy Endrow
- Sarah Chalke as Paula Crowe
- Mike Erwin as Ed
- Constance Zimmer as Peg the Teacher
- Matreya Fedor as Jesse Allen (7 years)
- Elisabeth Harnois as Jesse Allen
- Chris William Martin as Damon
- Jovanna Huguet as Maid of Honor
- Christopher Jacot as Simon / Best Man
- Alessandro Juliani as Ken
- Jocelyne Loewen as Pregnant Nancy

== Reception ==
On Rotten Tomatoes, the film has an approval rating of 31% based on reviews from 59 critics. The site's critical consensus reads: "Ryan Reynolds and Emily Mortimer do what they can, but ultimately Chaos Theory is an overly conventional dramedy." On Metacritic, the film had a weighted average score of 44 out of 100, based on reviews from 18 critics, indicating "mixed or average" reviews.

Dennis Harvey of Variety wrote: "The lead performers, the brighter fillips in Daniel Taplitz’s screenplay and Marcos Siega’s ("Pretty Persuasion") assured direction make this a pleasing item overall." Michael Rechtshaffen of The Hollywood Reporter wrote: "The picture continuously shuffles moods like tunes on an iPod without ever making any lasting commitments."

== Home media ==
The DVD was released on June 17, 2008, in the US.
