= Suspect: The Shooting of Jean Charles de Menezes =

2025 British television miniseries

- Genre: Drama
- Screenplay by: Jeff Pope
- Directed by: Paul Andrew Williams
- Starring: Edison Alcaide; Daniel Mays; Conleth Hill; Russell Tovey; Max Beesley; Emily Mortimer; Laura Aikman; Alex Jennings
- Country of origin: United Kingdom
- Original language: English
- No. of episodes: 4

Production
- Executive producers: Jeff Pope; Lee Mason; Kwadjo Dajan; Paul Andrew Williams
- Producer: Kwadjo Dajan
- Running time: 42-59 minutes
- Production companies: Etta Pictures; KDJ Productions

Original release
- Network: Disney+
- Release: 30 April 2025

Suspect: The Shooting of Jean Charles de Menezes is a 2025 British television miniseries about the 2005 killing of Brazilian electrician Jean Charles de Menezes by London police. Written by Jeff Pope, it stars Edison Alcaide, Daniel Mays, Russell Tovey, Laura Aikman, Alex Jennings, Conleth Hill, Emily Mortimer and Max Beesley. It was released on Disney+ on 30 April 2025.

== Premise ==
The series documents the killing of Jean Charles de Menezes by officers of the Metropolitan Police Service at Stockwell station on the London Underground after he was wrongly deemed to be one of the fugitives involved in the previous day's failed bombing attempts.

== Cast ==
- Edison Alcaide as Jean Charles de Menezes
- Daniel Mays as Cliff Todd
- Conleth Hill as Met Police Commissioner Sir Ian Blair
- Russell Tovey as Deputy Assistant Commissioner Brian Paddick
- Max Beesley as Assistant Commissioner Andy Hayman
- Emily Mortimer as Commander Cressida Dick
- Laura Aikman as Independent Police Complaints Commission secretary Lana Vandenberghe
- Alex Jennings as Michael Mansfield QC
- Rodrigo Ternevoy as Giovani de Menezes
- Anna Moreno as Maria Otoni de Menezes – the mother

== Production ==
The four-part series was commissioned by Disney+ in June 2023. Written by Jeff Pope, it is produced by Kwadjo Dajan and ITV Studios-backed Etta Pictures. Jean Charles de Menzes' parents and other relatives served as consultants for the series. The producer is Kwadjo Dajan, and the director is Paul Andrew Williams. The production company is Etta Pictures, which is part of ITV Studios, in association with Kwadjo Dajan’s KDJ Productions. Pope, Dajan and Williams also serve as executive producers. The series is executive-produced for Disney+ by Lee Mason. Filming was underway in London in October that year; later that month, scenes were filmed at Stockwell tube station over several days and nights. Objections were raised when production recreated the aftermath of the 7 July 2005 London bombings close to the location of the incident. On 6 November, Disney released a statement to the press defending itself and its methods in recreating the events for the purpose of making a factual dramatisation.

The cast is led by Edison Alcaide with the ensemble cast including Daniel Mays, Russell Tovey, Laura Aikman, Alex Jennings, Conleth Hill, Emily Mortimer and Max Beesley.

== Release ==
The series was made available in the United Kingdom on Disney+ from 30 April 2025.

== Reception ==
Phil Harrison for The Guardian described it as a "tense rendering of the events " and "rightly severe on the Met’s top brass but, crucially, never forgets the story of the blameless victim – played stoically and sensitively by Edison Alcaide.". Anita Singh for The Telegraph gave the series three out of five, feeling the series to be dramatic and sensationalist, and the lack of focus on de Menezes as a person.

== See also ==
- Jean Charles (2009 film)
