= Nigel Hess =

British composer (born 1953)

- Born: Nigel John Hess; 22 July 1953 (age 73); Weston-super-Mare, Somerset, England
- Occupation: Composer
- Years active: 1979–present
- Website: Myramusic.co.uk

Nigel John Hess (born 22 July 1953) is a British composer, best known for his television, theatre and film soundtracks, including the theme tunes to Campion, Maigret, Wycliffe, Dangerfield, Hetty Wainthropp Investigates, Badger and Ladies in Lavender.

== Biography ==
Hess was born in Weston-super-Mare, Somerset. He was educated at Weston-super-Mare Grammar School for Boys, and went on to study music at Cambridge University, where he was music director of the famous Footlights Revue Company. He has since worked extensively as a composer and conductor in television, theatre and film.

Hess has composed numerous scores for both American and British television productions, including A Woman of Substance, Vanity Fair, Campion, Testament (Ivor Novello Award for Best TV Theme), Summer's Lease (Television & Radio Industries Club Award for Best TV Theme), Chimera, Titmuss Regained, Maigret, Classic Adventure, Dangerfield, Just William, Wycliffe (Royal Television Society Nomination for Best TV Theme), The One Game, Every Woman Knows a Secret, Hetty Wainthropp Investigates (Ivor Novello Award for Best TV Theme and Royal Television Society Nomination for Best TV Theme), Badger, Ballykissangel, New Tricks and Stick with Me, Kid for Disney. His best-known film score is Ladies in Lavender (Classical Brits Nomination for Best Soundtrack Composer) starring Judi Dench and Maggie Smith. The music has become popular worldwide, and was performed in the film by violinist Joshua Bell with the Royal Philharmonic Orchestra.

While Hess was House Composer for the Royal Shakespeare Company he contributed twenty scores for RSC productions, and highlights from his Shakespeare scores have been recorded and performed by the RPO in concert as The Food of Love, hosted by Judi Dench and Patrick Stewart. Hess's most recent RSC scores were for Christopher Luscombe's productions of Love's Labour's Lost and Love's Labour's Won. Hess was awarded the New York Drama Desk Award for 'Outstanding Music in a Play' for the productions of Much Ado About Nothing and Cyrano de Bergerac on Broadway. His most recent theatre scores have been written for Shakespeare's Globe in London and include The Merry Wives of Windsor, Romeo and Juliet, Henry VIII, The Knight of the Burning Pestle and Nell Gwynn.

The debut album of Hess's vocal group Chameleon (reissued as Saylon Dola in 2005) won the Music Retailers Association Award for Best MOR Vocal Album, with tracks from the album subsequently covered by several artists, including tenor Russell Watson.

Hess has also composed much concert music, particularly for symphonic wind band, including commissions from Royal Air Force Music Services and the Band of the Coldstream Guards. July 2007 saw the première of Hess's Concerto for Piano and Orchestra (Classical Brits Nomination for Composer of the Year), commissioned by the Prince of Wales in memory of his grandmother. The soloist was internationally renowned pianist Lang Lang. Other commissions include a new ballet based on The Old Man of Lochnagar, a children's story written by the Prince of Wales in 1980, commissioned and premiered by the National Youth Ballet of Great Britain; A Christmas Overture, commissioned by John Rutter and premiered by the Royal Philharmonic Orchestra at the Royal Albert Hall, and A Celebration Overture, commissioned by the Royal Liverpool Philharmonic Orchestra for its 175th anniversary and also premiered at the Royal Albert Hall in 2015.

Hess is the great nephew of British pianist Dame Myra Hess. He named his music publishing company Myra Music in her honour. He is also a relative of former Chancellor of the Exchequer Nigel Lawson, who was Myra Hess' great-nephew.

In 2023, Hess was announced as one of the composers who would each create a brand new piece for the Coronation of Charles III and Camilla.

== Notable TV compositions ==
Hess's notable television compositions include

- Testament — awarded the Ivor Novello Award for best television theme
- Summer's Lease — awarded the Television and Radio Industries Club award for best television theme
- Wycliffe — nominated for the Royal Television Society best television theme
- Hetty Wainthropp Investigates — awarded the Ivor Novello Award for best television theme and nominated for the Royal Television Society best television theme award
