= Summer's Lease (TV series) =

- Genre: Drama
- Based on: Summer's Lease by John Mortimer
- Directed by: Martyn Friend
- Starring: John Gielgud; Susan Fleetwood; Rosemary Leach
- Composer: Nigel Hess
- Country of origin: United Kingdom
- Original language: English
- No. of series: 1
- No. of episodes: 4

Production
- Producer: Colin Rogers
- Running time: 55 minutes
- Production company: BBC

Original release
- Network: BBC Two
- Release: 1 November – 22 November 1989

Summer's Lease is a British television drama miniseries which aired in four parts on BBC Two in 1989. It is based on the novel of the same name by John Mortimer who adapted it for the screen. Sir John Gielgud won the Primetime Emmy Award for Outstanding Lead Actor in a Limited or Anthology Series or Movie for his performance and the soundtrack, composed by Nigel Hess was named by the Television and Radio Industries Club Best Television Theme.

== Cast ==
- Susan Fleetwood as Molly Pargeter (4 episodes)
- John Gielgud as Haverford Downs (4 episodes)
- Michael Pennington as Hugh Pargeter (4 episodes)
- Rosemary Leach as Nancy Leadbetter (4 episodes)
- Caroline Waldron as Henry Pargeter (4 episodes)
- Veronica Lazar as Baronessa Dulcibene (4 episodes)
- Suzanne Hay as Sam Pargeter (4 episodes)
- Samantha Glenn as Jack Pargeter (4 episodes)
- Siria Betti as Giovanna (4 episodes)
- Denis Lill as Ken Corduroy (3 episodes)
- Gabrielle Anwar as Chrissie Kettering (3 episodes)
- Mel Martin as Rosie Fortinbras (2 episodes)
- Frederick Treves as Nicholas Tapscott (2 episodes)
- Annette Crosbie as Connie Tapscott (2 episodes)
- Feodor Chaliapin Jr. as Prince Tosti-Castelnuovo (2 episodes)
- Graham McGrath as Chrissie's Friend (2 episodes)
- Pupo De Luca as The Messenger (2 episodes)
- Siri Neal as Chrissie's Friend (2 episodes)
- Leslie Phillips as William Fosdyke (1 episode)
- Jeremy Kemp as Buck Kettering (1 episode)
- Elizabeth Bennett as Mrs. Marcia Tobias (1 episode)
- Bernice Stegers as Louise Corduroy (1 episode)
- Carole Mowlam as Sandra Kettering (1 episode)

== Reception ==
In a 1991 review, John J. O'Connor of The New York Times called the series "more successful as travelogue than drama." O'Connor summarised that despite some excellent performances, the characters "are not terribly interesting."

=== Accolades ===
At the 1991 Primetime Emmy Awards, Sir John Gielgud won the Outstanding Lead Actor in a Limited or Anthology Series or Movie, and was also nominated for the British Academy Television Award for Best Actor.

== Bibliography ==
- Jerry Roberts. Encyclopedia of Television Film Directors. Scarecrow Press, 2009.
