= The Twisted Childhood Universe =

Horror film franchise

- Official logo
- Produced by: Rhys Frake-Waterfield; Scott Chambers
- Production companies: Jagged Edge Productions; ITN Distribution
- Distributed by: Altitude Film Distribution
- Country: United Kingdom
- Language: English
- Budget: $1,050,000–1,185,000 (5 films)
- Box office: $18.8 million (5 films)

The Twisted Childhood Universe (TCU), also referred to as the Poohniverse, is a British film series and shared universe of independent slasher horror films, each serving as a dark reimagining of public domain classic characters from children's literature. It was conceived and created by Rhys Frake-Waterfield, and produced by the filmmaker's Jagged Edge Productions film studio. The movies through the storytelling lens of horror depict these characters as murderous monsters; Winnie-the-Pooh, Peter Pan, Bambi, and Pinocchio have been featured, with others planned.

Although the franchise's first instalment titled Winnie-the-Pooh: Blood and Honey, was met with negative critical reception, it turned a profit at the box office. The film's quality was called into question, with criticisms given to the script, acting, directing, and cinematography; it also received five Golden Raspberry Awards. In response to this, Frake-Waterfield stated he is determined to raise the standard with future movies in the franchise. The Twisted Childhood Universe has grossed over $18.8 million worldwide.

== Development ==
In 2022, after Winnie-the-Pooh entered the public domain, Jagged Edge Productions began production on a horror adaptation. Upon releasing the first promotional images for the film, the movie became a viral Internet sensation. After the movie's limited release, it was ultimately deemed a financial success, recouping $7 million from its small budget of $50,000. Upon the monetary gain, Jagged Edge Productions announced plans to produce a sequel with a higher budget, while also stating a then-unnamed cinematic universe featuring characters from various children's stories was in development. In February 2023, it was also stated the characters in each of the individual movies will ultimately share the screen in the form of a crossover.

In March 2024, Jagged Edge Productions officially announced the shared-universe franchise will be titled "The Twisted Childhood Universe" while also announcing a full slate of films, culminating in a cross-over movie. Scott Chambers compared the franchise in contrast to The Conjuring Universe, with intended plans being that each film has different tones, stating: "Every time you watch one of those films, they've got the same tone, the same vibe, all that sort of thing. Whereas in ours, it's not like that. If you don't like one of them, you may actually like the next. So for example, if you don't like the campiness of the Winnie-the-Pooh films, you may actually like Pan because it's actually a lot more grounded, a lot more serious and disturbing. Then if you don't like that, you may like Pinocchio because he's wearing skin, running around killing people with his nose. I think there's a lot of fun to be had."

== Films ==
=== Released ===
The Twisted Childhood Universe released films
Film	UK release date	Directed by	Screenplay by	Produced by
Winnie-the-Pooh: Blood and Honey	March 10, 2023	Rhys Frake-Waterfield	Rhys Frake-Waterfield	Scott Chambers and Rhys Frake-Waterfield
Winnie-the-Pooh: Blood and Honey 2	June 7, 2024	Rhys Frake-Waterfield	Matt Leslie	Scott Chambers and Rhys Frake-Waterfield
Peter Pan's Neverland Nightmare	February 24, 2025	Scott Chambers	Scott Chambers	Scott Chambers and Rhys Frake-Waterfield
Bambi: The Reckoning	August 15, 2025	Dan Allen	Rhys Warrington	Scott Chambers and Rhys Frake-Waterfield
Pinocchio Unstrung	July 24, 2026	Rhys Frake-Waterfield	Rhys Frake-Waterfield	Scott Chambers and Rhys Frake-Waterfield

==== Winnie-the-Pooh: Blood and Honey (2023) ====
The first film in the franchise, Winnie-the-Pooh: Blood and Honey, follows the characters Winnie-the-Pooh and Piglet as murderous, misanthropic villains. The film began development after the original Winnie-the-Pooh book entered the public domain in 2022. Originally slated for an October 2022 release date, the film became viral after its announcement, and increased publicity motivated reshoots and a 2023 cinematic release.

Winnie-the-Pooh: Blood and Honey was released in the United Kingdom on 10 March 2023. It made $7.7 million worldwide on a budget of $50,000.

==== Winnie-the-Pooh: Blood and Honey 2 (2024) ====
In June 2022, Frake-Waterfield expressed interest in creating a sequel, and stated he wants to "ramp it up even more and go even crazier and go even more extreme". In November 2022, he announced a sequel, titled Winnie-the-Pooh 2, was in development with him returning as director and writer, on a budget five times larger than the previous instalment; it would later be confirmed the budget had increased to ten times larger than the first film. In September 2023, teaser images were released, and it was revealed the film will not feature the same cast as its predecessor. The sequel commenced principal photography in late 2023.

Winnie-the-Pooh: Blood and Honey 2 received a limited theatrical release in the U.S. from 26 to 28 March 2024; and a theatrical release in the United Kingdom on 7 June 2024. It made $7.6 million worldwide on a budget of $500,000.

==== Peter Pan's Neverland Nightmare (2025) ====
In November 2022, a horror movie revolving around the title character from Peter Pan was announced as being in development; with Rhys Frake-Waterfield and Scott Chambers once again serving as producers. Chambers was later announced to be the director from a script he wrote, with the filmmaker stating the movie will take inspiration from a combination of French cinema, High Tension and The Black Phone. The plot centres on Wendy's search for her brother Michael, who has been abducted by Peter Pan and Tinker Bell. Frake-Waterfield stated Tinker Bell will be "heavily obese and recovering from drugs", while Chambers stated the character is "hooked on heroin and convinced it's Pixie Dust". Chambers revealed in June 2024 that the film would tonally be "extremely darker" than the Blood and Honey films, dealing with themes of child abduction.

Peter Pan's Neverland Nightmare was released in the United States on 13 January 2025, and in the United Kingdom on 24 February 2025. It made $1.6 million worldwide on a budget of £250,000–£310,000.

==== Bambi: The Reckoning (2025) ====
In November 2022, a horror film centered on the titular character from Bambi, a Life in the Woods was announced as being in development. It was directed by Dan Allen, from a script written by Rhys Warrington. Rhys Frake-Waterfield and Scott Chambers once again served as producers. The plot follows a woman named Xana and her son named Benji, who must fight to survive when they find themselves as prey to a mutated, grieving, killing machine of a deer following a car wreck. Officially titled Bambi: The Reckoning, the movie was developed by ITN Studios and Jagged Edge Productions. Chambers described the film as "an incredibly dark retelling of the 1928 story we all know and love. Finding inspiration from the design used in Netflix's The Ritual, Bambi will be a vicious killing machine that lurks in the wilderness." Allen in April 2025 revealed the film would be themed around the "loss of innocence" and the "death of childhood."

Bambi: The Reckoning was released theatrically on 25 July 2025 in the United States by Seismic Releasing, and in the United Kingdom on 15 August 2025. It made $1,085,640 worldwide on a budget of £250,000–£325,000.

==== Pinocchio Unstrung (2026) ====
In January 2024, it was announced a horror film centered around the titular character from The Adventures of Pinocchio was in development. With the release of the first promotional concept art, the project was officially titled Pinocchio Unstrung. The film focuses on James, the grandson of Geppetto, who meets Geppetto's marionette puppet named Pinocchio, that through magical means is alive. Introducing him to the outside world, the naïveté of Pinocchio sends him on a murderous crusade to eliminate all things he interprets as bad. In November 2024, Robert Englund was cast as the Cricket, while Richard Brake was cast as Geppetto. The director described the film as a "dark coming-of-age story told from the puppet's perspective: a creation struggling for autonomy while manipulated by the sinister forces around him, from Robert Englund's sinister "Jiminy Cricket" to Richard Brake's obsessive Geppetto".

Pinocchio Unstrung had its world premiere at the Brussels International Fantastic Film Festival on 11 April 2026, and was released in the United States on 24 July. It was previously stated to be released in 2025.

=== Upcoming ===
The Twisted Childhood Universe upcoming films
Film	UK release date	Directed by	Screenplay by	Produced by	Status
Winnie-the-Pooh: Blood and Honey 3 – The Lost Years	January 2027	Scott Chambers	Richard Stanley	Scott Chambers & Rhys Frake-Waterfield	Post-production
Poohniverse: Monsters Assemble	TBA	Rhys Frake-Waterfield	Rhys Frake-Waterfield & Scott Chambers	Scott Chambers & Rhys Frake-Waterfield	Pre-production

==== Winnie-the-Pooh: Blood and Honey 3 – The Lost Years (2027) ====
In March 2024, shortly after the second film's release, it was announced that Winnie-the-Pooh: Blood and Honey 3 had entered development. The film will have a larger budget than its predecessors and will include the Heffalumps and the Woozles. In January 2025, franchise producer Scott Chambers stated the movie would be a part of the studio's second phase of movies; which will release after Poohniverse: Monsters Assemble. By April 2026, however, the film was stated to be releasing before Poohniverse. By August 2025, it was reported that Chambers would direct the film, from a screenplay by Richard Stanley. In March 2026, Roger L. Jackson was cast as the voice of Rabbit. Chambers and Lewis Santer will reprise their roles as Christopher Robin and Tigger, respectively, while George Montague replaced Ryan Oliva as Winnie-the-Pooh. Stanley in May 2026 revealed that he was cast as Balthazar Von Woozle, the film's main antagonist.

In April 2026, one of the official social media pages of the franchise announced that an adaptation of The Little Mermaid will feature in the movie as a part of the Woozle's Circus. Principal photography was tentatively scheduled for that month, while an official production announcement teaser debuted on April 23, which was the first day of filming. Filming eventually concluded in May of the same year. In July 2026, it was revealed by Chambers that the film would serve as a prequel to the second film, and set sometime after the first movie’s prologue; explaining that the movie provides additional backstory for various characters while leading directly into the next movie. By October, the film's full title was revealed; Winnie-the-Pooh: Blood and Honey 3 – The Lost Years is slated for a January 2027 release.

==== Poohniverse: Monsters Assemble (TBA) ====
In March 2024, the franchise's first crossover film was announced with the official title of Poohniverse: Monsters Assemble, with the font of the title parodying The Avengers (titled Avengers Assemble in the United Kingdom and Ireland) from the Marvel Cinematic Universe. The plot will include characters from each of the preceding instalments, as the murderous versions of characters from children's fairytales team-up to hunt down the individual survivors of their massacres and seek to take over the world in the process. The team of nightmarish monsters will include returning characters such as Winnie-the-Pooh, Tigger, Piglet, Owl, Bambi, Peter Pan, Tinker Bell, Hook, Pinocchio, and the Cricket; while also introducing Rabbit, Sleeping Beauty, the Mad Hatter, Cheshire Cat, and others to the cast. Rhys Frake-Waterfield will serve as director, in addition to producing alongside Scott Chambers. In December 2024, Scott Chambers announced Mary Poppins will also appear in the movie. The following month he stated she, Peter Pan, and Mad Hatter will be the three most villainous characters of the film. In January 2025, one of the franchise's official social media pages announced that the French-Belgium comic strip character Tintin will appear in the film after his earliest incarnations entered the public domain on January 1, 2025. Frake-Waterfield in June 2026 described the film as "kooky, crazy and fun," and expressed belief that they were "the first people to ever have a film like this in the horror world."

Principal photography is scheduled to commence sometime in 2026. Frake-Waterfield expressed hope that they would start filming either in late 2026 or early 2027.

=== Other projects in development ===
The Twisted Childhood Universe films in development
Film	UK release date	Directed by	Screenplay by	Produced by	Status
Awakening Sleeping Beauty	TBA	TBA	TBA	Scott Chambers & Rhys Frake-Waterfield	In development
Snow White Returns	TBA	TBA	TBA	Scott Chambers & Rhys Frake-Waterfield	In development
Alice & The Mad Hatter	TBA	Scott Chambers	Scott Chambers	Scott Chambers & Rhys Frake-Waterfield	In development
Tigger's Return	TBA	TBA	TBA	Scott Chambers & Rhys Frake-Waterfield	In development
Untitled Mary Poppins film	TBA	TBA	TBA	Scott Chambers & Rhys Frake-Waterfield	In development
Untitled Peter Pan's Neverland Nightmare sequel	TBA	TBA	Scott Chambers	Scott Chambers & Rhys Frake-Waterfield	In development

==== Awakening Sleeping Beauty ====
After previously being listed on the studio's IMDb production page, Jagged Edge Productions confirmed in March 2024 that Awakening Sleeping Beauty is one of the projects being developed as a part of the Twisted Childhood Universe film franchise. The studio later shared posters for the upcoming instalments of the franchise at the Cannes Film Festival, including the Sleeping Beauty movie in May of the same year.

==== Snow White Returns ====
In May 2024 during the Cannes Film Festival, Jagged Edged Productions revealed the teaser posters for upcoming instalments of The Twisted Childhood Universe; officially announcing Snow White Returns as a part of the lineup.

==== Alice & The Mad Hatter ====
In January 2025, Scott Chambers stated after being featured as one of the primary evils of Poohniverse: Monsters Assemble, the Mad Hatter will feature in an upcoming standalone movie. Later that month, the producer announced the project's official title as Alice & The Mad Hatter. The filmmaker explained that the project will centre around the franchise's version of Alice, who is pursued by an obsessed Mad Hatter because of her work as an escort for an agency named the White Rabbit. Chambers stated the movie will be part of the franchise's second phase of movies, expressing his intentions to direct, while citing other horror movies as creative inspiration including Opera, Maniac, and MaXXXine.

==== Tigger's Return ====
In January 2025, franchise producer Scott Chambers announced as part of the studio's second phase of movies, a spin-off of the Winnie-the-Pooh: Blood and Honey movies centered around Tigger. The project will enter production following the release of Poohniverse: Monsters Assemble. The producer explained the audience's reception to the character as the reason the character getting his own instalment.

==== Untitled Mary Poppins film ====
In January 2025, franchise producer Chambers announced as a part of the franchise's future slate of films, Mary Poppins will receive a standalone movie following an introduction in Poohniverse: Monsters Assemble; while also stating the story will depict the character as a kidnapper.

==== Untitled Peter Pan's Neverland Nightmare sequel ====
In January 2025, writer/director Scott Chambers announced plans for a sequel to Peter Pan's Neverland Nightmare, acknowledging that its realization is dependent on the first movie's box office performance. The filmmaker stated he had completed the script with the plot exploring Neverland as a real location within the continuity of the franchise, despite the first movie intentionally misleading audiences to infer that it was merely a hallucination that Peter Pan experiences while he is under the influence of drug abuse.

== Timeline ==
The Twisted Childhood Universe timeline The official timeline, as released by the filmmakers of the franchise.
2023	Winnie-the-Pooh: Blood and Honey, (Note: Though Winnie-the-Pooh: Blood and Honey was retroactively made an in-universe B-movie of the Hundred Acre Massacre, the events depicted chronologically take place in September 2023.); Winnie-the-Pooh: Blood and Honey 3 – The Lost Years (Note: ''Winnie-the-Pooh: Blood and Honey 3 – The Lost Years is set chronologically after the prologue story in the first film (which is retroactively depicted as an in-universe B-movie of canon events that took place); exploring details that lead directly into Winnie-the-Pooh: Blood and Honey 2.); Bambi: The Reckoning (Note: Bambi: The Reckoning chronologically is set in December 2023.)
2024	Pinocchio Unstrung, (Note: Pinocchio Unstrung is chronologically set in March 2024.); Peter Pan's Neverland Nightmare, (Note: Peter Pan's Neverland Nightmare is chronologically set in March 2024 after the events of Pinocchio Unstrung.); Winnie-the-Pooh: Blood and Honey 2 (Note: Winnie-the-Pooh: Blood and Honey 2 is chronologically set in March 2024 after the events of Peter Pan's Neverland Nightmare.)

In April 2026, Chambers revealed the chronological order of the franchise in an Instagram Q&A; with an infographic being officially released later that month. The continuity of the franchise's first phase of films takes place between September 2023 through March of 2024.

Winnie-the-Pooh: Blood and Honey 3 – The Lost Years is set sometime in the five year gap after Christopher Robin leaves for college but before he returns to the Hundred Acre Wood, acting as a prequel to the first two films. Similarly, Bambi: The Reckoning occurs between the events of the first two Winnie-the-Pooh: Blood and Honey films, set three months after the first film and three months before its sequel. Winnie-the-Pooh: Blood and Honey 2 takes place six months after its predecessor and simultaneously during the events of Peter Pan's Neverland Nightmare and Pinocchio: Unstrung, with characters from Blood and Honey 2 making appearances in both films. Scott Chambers revealed in an interview with ScreenRant that all three films take place in the same week, with Poohniverse: Monsters Assemble set sometime after.

== Main cast and characters ==
List indicators

This section includes characters who will appear or have appeared in the franchise in main roles.

- An empty grey cell indicates the character was not in the film, or that the character's official presence has not yet been confirmed.
- ^{A} indicates an appearance through archival footage or audio.
- ^{C} indicates a cameo role.
- ^{V} indicates a voice-only role.
- ^{Y} indicates a younger version of the character.

Character	Films						
Character	Winnie-the-Pooh: Blood and Honey	Winnie-the-Pooh: Blood and Honey 2	Peter Pan's Neverland Nightmare	Bambi: The Reckoning	Pinocchio Unstrung	Winnie-the-Pooh: Blood and Honey 3 – The Lost Years	Poohniverse: Monsters Assemble
Villains
William "Billy" Robin Winnie-the-Pooh	Craig David Dowsett	Ryan Oliva Peter DeSouza-Feighoney^{Y} Craig David Dowset (Note: Dowset appears as Winnie-the-Pooh in archive footage only. The sequence reveals through a retcon, that Winnie-the-Pooh: Blood and Honey (2023) is an in-universe B-movie adaptation of similar events.)^{C}^{A}				George Drogo Jude Gore^{Y}	George Drogo Jude Gore^{Y}
Piglet	Chris Cordell	Eddy MacKenzie Chris Cordell (Note: Cordell appears as Piglet in archive footage only. The sequence reveals through a retcon, that Winnie-the-Pooh: Blood and Honey (2023) is an in-universe B-movie adaptation of similar events.)^{C}^{A}				TBA	TBA
Eeyore	Mentioned					TBA	TBA
Owl	Mentioned	Marcus Massey				TBA	TBA
Tigger		Lewis Santer				Lewis Santer Buddy Powell^{Y}	Lewis Santer Buddy Powell^{Y}
Rabbit	Mentioned	Referenced^{C}				Jacob Marshfield Roger L. Jackson^{V} Henry Bell^{Y}	Jacob Marshfield Roger L. Jackson^{V} Henry Bell^{Y}
Kanga		Mentioned				Mentioned	TBA
Roo		Mentioned				Mentioned	TBA
Peter Pan		Referenced^{C}	Martin Portlock Oscar Hastings^{Y}				Martin Portlock
Tinker Bell Timothy “Timmy” Carter			Kit Green Holden M. N. Smith^{Y}				Kit Green
Capt. James Hook			Charity Kase Lucas Allermann^{Y}				Charity Kase
Bambi		Referenced^{C}		Appears			Appears
Pinocchio		Referenced^{C}			Jude-Evan Lloyd^{V}		Jude-Evan Lloyd^{V}
The Cricket					Robert Englund^{V}		Robert Englund^{V}
Balthazar von Woozle						Richard Stanley	TBA
The Cheshire Cat							Anferny Beutel
Sleeping Beauty							TBA
Mad Hatter							TBA
Mary Poppins							TBA
Little Mermaid						TBA	TBA
Humans
Christopher Robin	Nikolai Leon Frederick Dallaway^{Y}	Scott Chambers Mason Gold^{Y} Nikolai Leon (Note: Leon appears as Robin in archive footage only. The sequence reveals through a retcon, that Winnie-the-Pooh: Blood and Honey (2023) is an in-universe B-movie adaptation of similar events.)^{C}^{A}			Scott Chambers	Scott Chambers^{C}	Scott Chambers
Lexy		Tallulah Evans				Mentioned	Tallulah Evans
Helen "Bunny" Robin		Thea Evans				Mentioned	Thea Evans
Dr. Mary Darling		Teresa Banham	Teresa Banham				Teresa Banham
Wendy Darling			Megan Placito				Megan Placito
Michael Darling			Peter DeSouza-Feighoney		Peter DeSouza-Feighoney		Peter DeSouza-Feighoney
John Darling			Campbell Wallace				Campbell Wallace
Xana				Roxanne McKee			Roxanne McKee
Benji				Tom Mulheron			Tom Mulheron
James					Cameron Bell		Cameron Bell
Geppetto					Richard Brake		Richard Brake
Tintin							TBA

== Reception ==
=== Box-office performance ===
Film	U.K. release date	Box office gross			All-time ranking		Budget	Ref.
Film	U.K. release date	U.S. and Canada	Other territories	Worldwide	U.S. and Canada	Worldwide	Budget	Ref.
Winnie-the-Pooh: Blood and Honey	10 March 2023	$2,082,898	$5,634,146	$7,717,044	8,033	10,037	$50,000	
Winnie-the-Pooh: Blood and Honey 2	7 June 2024	$533,144	$7,073,459	$7,606,603	10,059	8,760	$500,000	
Peter Pan's Neverland Nightmare	24 February 2025	$230,515	$1,427,095	$1,657,610	11,565	15,565	£250,000–£310,000	
Bambi: The Reckoning	15 August 2025	$668,717	$416,923	$1,085,640	12,242	18,920	£250,000–£325,000	
Pinocchio Unstrung	24 July 2026	$625,726	$193,248	$818,974	TBA	TBA	TBA	
Total		$4,141,000	$14,744,871	$18,885,871	–	–	$1,050,000– $1,185,000	

=== Critical and public response ===
Film
Film	Rotten Tomatoes	Metacritic
Winnie-the-Pooh: Blood and Honey	3% (64 reviews)	16 (19 reviews)
Winnie-the-Pooh: Blood and Honey 2	48% (42 reviews)	27 (9 reviews)
Peter Pan's Neverland Nightmare	39% (23 reviews)	50 (4 reviews)
Bambi: The Reckoning	59% (17 reviews)	N/A
Pinocchio Unstrung	74% (27 reviews)	50 (4 reviews)
