= Winnie-the-Pooh: Blood and Honey 3 – The Lost Years =

Upcoming slasher film by Scott Chambers

- Official release poster
- Directed by: Scott Chambers
- Screenplay by: Richard Stanley
- Based on: Winnie-the-Pooh by; A. A. Milne; E. H. Shepard
- Produced by: Rhys Frake-Waterfield; Scott Chambers
- Starring: Josephine Blazier; George Drogo; Richard Stanley; Lewis Santer; Jacob Marshfield; Roger L. Jackson; Kira Reed; Zena Donnelly; Leo Harris; Paul W. Black; Carla Lisa Roberts; Chrissie Wunna; Danielle Ronald; Cris Parker; Kevin Hummell; Belle Taylor; Scott Chambers
- Production companies: Jagged Edge Productions; ITN Distribution
- Release date: January 2027
- Country: United Kingdom
- Language: English

Winnie-the-Pooh: Blood and Honey 3 – The Lost Years is an upcoming British independent slasher film directed by Scott Chambers, from a screenplay by Richard Stanley, and produced by Rhys Frake-Waterfield and Scott Jeffrey. It is the sixth instalment in The Twisted Childhood Universe (TCU) and serves as a prequel to Winnie-the-Pooh: Blood and Honey (2023) and Winnie-the-Pooh: Blood and Honey 2 (2024). Like its predecessors, it is a horror interpretation of A. A. Milne and E. H. Shepard's Winnie-the-Pooh books. The film stars George Drogo, Josephine Blazier, Stanley, Lewis Santer, Jacob Marshfield, Roger L. Jackson, Zena Donnelly, Leo Harris, Kira Reed, Paul W. Black and Chambers. Set in the "lost years" between Christopher Robin's departure and return to the Hundred Acre Wood, it follows Winnie-the-Pooh, Tigger and Rabbit as they are captured and forced to perform in a sinister travelling carnival and must break out, while orphaned MoMo joins the circus investigating the disappearance of her mother and discovers the dark secrets within.

Two days after the release of Blood and Honey 2, it was announced that a third film was in development. Unlike its predecessors, which were directed by Frake-Waterfield, the third film is directed by Chambers, who portrayed Christopher Robin. In July 2026, it was revealed by Chambers that the film would serve as a prequel to the second film and set sometime after the first film's prologue; explaining that the film provides additional backstory for various characters while leading directly into the next movie. Principal photography began in April 2026 and concluded in May that same year.

Winnie-the-Pooh: Blood and Honey 3 – The Lost Years is scheduled to be released in late January 2027.

== Premise ==
Pooh and Piglet were killed, their reign of terror ended. But something in the Hundred Acre Wood refuses to stay dead. The massacre has just begun... They are coming -- bigger, deadlier and hungrier.

== Cast ==
- George Drogo as Winnie-the-Pooh
- Josephine Blazier as MoMo Milne
- Richard Stanley as Balthazar von Woozle
- Lewis Santer as Tigger
- Jacob Marshfield as Rabbit
  - Roger L. Jackson as the voice of Rabbit
- Kira Reed as Karna
- Zena Donnelly as Billie
- Leo Harris as Oliver
- Paul W. Black as Shandor
- Carla Lisa Roberts as Allegra
- Chrissie Wunna as Roma
- Danielle Ronald as Faith
- Cris Parker as Morris
- Kevin Hummel as Jimmy
- Scott Chambers as Christopher Robin
- Belle Taylor as Mary Robin

Additionally, the Heffalumps and The Little Mermaid will appear.

== Production ==
=== Development ===
On 28 March 2024, shortly after Winnie-the-Pooh: Blood and Honey 2's release, it was announced that a third film, titled Winnie-the-Pooh: Blood and Honey 3, had entered development. The film would have a larger budget than its predecessors and would feature Rabbit (who previously only appeared in the first movie's prologue and the second film's end credits in a sketch), as well as the Heffalumps and the Woozles. In January 2025, franchise producer Scott Chambers stated it would be part of The Twisted Childhood Universe's second phase; which would release after the crossover film Poohniverse: Monsters Assemble. However, the film was eventually confirmed to be releasing before Poohniverse instead. By August 2025, it was reported that Chambers, who portrayed Christopher Robin in Blood and Honey 2, would direct the film, from a screenplay by Richard Stanley. Rhys Frake-Waterfield, who directed the first two Blood and Honey films, chose not to return as director as he was working on Pinocchio Unstrung at the same time, and felt otherwise he would've been "stretching [himself] too thin." During a tour of the Winnie-the-Pooh: Blood and Honey scare maze at Halloween Haunt Festival in Hertfordshire in October 2025, it was revealed by Chambers that the film would take place in a circus setting rather then the Hundred Acre Wood.

Speaking with YouTuber "Nasty" Neal Jones (aka Without Your Head), Stanley described working on the film as a "happy accident". The filmmaker originally offered Chambers a role in his upcoming psychedelic horror comedy Steel Donkeys. Chambers was impressed by the script, and immediately offered Stanley a chance to write the screenplay for Blood and Honey 3, to which he agreed. Stanley expressed he deeply researched the lore of Winnie-the-Pooh, such as reading the original stories by A. A. Milne. The Woozles were what interested Stanley the most, noting the residents of the Hundred Acre Wood were afraid of them, yet it was never established what they actually were, and therefore seized an opportunity to flesh out the creatures. Stanley revealed that after being presented as the main villains of the first two films, Blood and Honey 3 will shift Pooh and his friends back towards being "the good guys" by introducing a "worse" and a "darker evil into the Hundred Acre Wood." The Woozle's Circus and Toon Carnival were created as a metaphor for independent filmakers raiding public domain children's characters for profit. Lewis Santer added further, expressing that while his character Tigger was portrayed as "pure evil" in Blood and Honey 2, the third film will explore his and the others's motivations, stating "he's more broken rather than evil." Stanley additionally revealed that he had written a "very dramatic arc" for Rabbit after realising the character hadn't made his debut in the Blood and Honey series yet. In an Instagram Q&A with Chambers, it was revealed that Piglet and Owl will not reappear in the film due to budget constraints. Kanga and Roo were planned to make an appearance, though they were ultimately cut for similar reasons.

In July 2026, it was announced that the film would be a prequel. Chambers explained in a interview with ScreenRant that because he had taken over as director from Frake-Waterfield, produced and portrayed Christopher Robin all at once, he decided to craft a storyline "that doesn't really involve Christopher" while also desiring to avoid "repeating the same beats" as Blood and Honey 2 or impacting future plans for the TCU; the crossover Poohniverse: Monsters Assemble is set chronologically after Blood and Honey 2. Christopher Robin will make a brief appearance that links to Blood and Honey 2. In October 2026, the film's full title was revealed as Winnie-the-Pooh: Blood and Honey 3 – The Lost Years.

Like its predecessor, the film features new character designs. Millennium FX, which previously worked on films such as The Toxic Avenger (2023) and Primate (2025), would create creature designs and special effects for the film. The film was said to be darker and more serious then its predecessors.

=== Casting ===
In January 2026, George Drogo was cast as the titular character, taking over the role from Ryan Oliva. Later that month, it was reported that Stanley was added to the cast, who revealed his character as Balthazar von Woozle, the owner and ringmaster of Woozle's Circus. Additionally, Stanley revealed Balthazar to not be human at all, but a 100-year old Woozle instead. That same month, Karol Stanisz was cast as the physical embodiment of Rabbit. Stansiz eventually dropped out due to scheduling conflicts, however, and was replaced by Jacob Marshfield. In March 2026, Roger L. Jackson was annouced as the voice of Rabbit, while Josephine Blazier was cast as MoMo, the film's female lead. Shayla Reagan, Lauren Staerck, FiFi Aniach, Zena Donnelly, Kira Reed Lorsch, Belle Taylor, Buddy Powell, Phoebe Hickling, Jon Callaway, Fyn Phoenix, Paul Black and Leo Harris were all cast in undisclosed roles. Chambers and Santer are set to reprise their roles as Christopher Robin and Tigger, respectively. In April 2026, YouTuber Cris Parker (aka "3C Films") was revealed to have joined the cast. Parker previously made a voice cameo in Blood and Honey 2. The rest of the cast was announced that same month.

=== Filming ===
Principal photography was tentatively scheduled to commence in April 2026, while an official production announcement teaser debuted on 23 April, the first day of filming. Filming took place in York, East Essex and London. That same month, one of the official social media pages of the franchise announced that The Little Mermaid will be featured in the movie as a part of the Woozle's Circus. Filming wrapped on May 24.

== Release ==
Winnie-the-Pooh: Blood and Honey 3 – The Lost Years is scheduled to be released theatrically in late January 2027.
