= Peter Pan's Neverland Nightmare =

2025 film by Scott Chambers

- Theatrical release poster
- Directed by: Scott Chambers
- Screenplay by: Scott Chambers
- Based on: Peter Pan by J. M. Barrie
- Produced by: Rhys Frake-Waterfield; Scott Chambers
- Starring: Megan Placito; Martin Portlock; Kit Green; Teresa Banham; Kierston Wareing; Peter DeSouza-Feighoney; Charity Kase; Nicholas Woodeson
- Cinematography: Vince Knight
- Edited by: Dan Allen
- Music by: Greg Birkumshaw
- Production companies: Jagged Edge Productions; ITN Distribution
- Distributed by: Altitude Film Distribution
- Release dates: 13 January 2025 (United States); 24 February 2025 (United Kingdom)
- Running time: 89 minutes
- Country: United Kingdom
- Language: English
- Budget: £250,000–£310,000
- Box office: $1.6 million

Peter Pan's Neverland Nightmare is a 2025 British independent slasher film written and directed by Scott Chambers. It is the third instalment in The Twisted Childhood Universe (TCU), and serves as a horror retelling of J. M. Barrie's Peter Pan. The film stars Megan Placito as Wendy Darling and Martin Portlock as the title character, with Kit Green, Peter DeSouza-Feighoney, Teresa Banham, Olumide Olorunfemi, Campbell Wallace, and Nicholas Woodeson in supporting roles. It follows Wendy as she embarks on a quest to find her younger brother Michael, who has been abducted by Peter Pan and Tinker Bell to be taken to Neverland.

First announced in November 2022 as a Peter Pan-based horror film, the film was subsequently revealed to be set in the TCU shared continuity. The first draft of the film was a more traditional approach that took place entirely in Neverland. However, budgetary reasons and difficult experiences felt during Winnie-the-Pooh: Blood and Honey 2 (2024) led to the script being rewritten into a more realistic, contained, psychological approach. The cast was announced between January and June 2024, with Banham reprising her role from Blood and Honey 2 as Mary Darling.

Peter Pan's Neverland Nightmare was released theatrically in the United States on 13 January 2025, and in the United Kingdom on 24 February. The film received mixed reviews from critics and grossed $1.6 million worldwide.

== Plot ==
15 years ago, Peter Pan worked at a fantasy-themed circus where he performed as a mime for many children. After a show one night, Peter attempts to kidnap a 6-year-old James Hook in his house. James' mother, Roxanne, fights Peter and mutilates his face, but is overpowered and killed while Peter abducts James.

In the present day, Wendy Darling lives in a complex family dynamic with her younger brothers, John and Michael, and their mother, Mary, who works as a hypnotherapist at the nearby town of Ashdown. (Note: As depicted in Winnie-the-Pooh: Blood and Honey 2 (2024).) On Michael's birthday, Wendy gives him a ride to school and promises to pick him up later. However, she gets distracted while talking to her boyfriend, and does not notice that Michael leaves on his bike.

Michael rides through the woods and Peter eventually abducts him. The Darling family receives a phone call from Peter, who informs them that he will take Michael to "Neverland". The next day, Peter slaughters a bus full of children. Simultaneously, Wendy, her best friend, Tiger Lily, and Lily's brother, Joey, drive to Ashdown, where they visit a man named Steven Carter, whose son Timmy was kidnapped by Peter years ago.

Wendy stays the night with Lily's family, but Peter arrives to abduct Joey, killing Lily and her parents in the process; Wendy follows him. Meanwhile, Michael meets a trans woman going as "Tinker Bell", who believes every lie Peter has told her over the years following the drug abuse Peter subjected her to and is convinced that the children Peter kills are actually going to the fictional "Neverland".

After following Peter to an abandoned manor, where he is holding Michael and Joey hostage, Wendy breaks into it to save him. Peter becomes aware of Wendy's presence as she finds Michael. The siblings are separated when Peter attacks them, and Wendy hides in the basement. She finds Joey alive in a closed coffin and helps him to escape through a window. Wendy also discovers James, now heavily mutilated and chained, with a hook for a hand.

Tinker Bell, now revealed to be Timmy, betrays Peter after Wendy reveals that Steven misses her. In response, Peter brutally kills Tinker Bell and engages in a fight with Wendy, in which he bites off two of her fingers. Michael appears and bludgeons Peter in the face until James emerges from the basement, hooks a critically injured Peter in the shoulder, and drags him away.

1 year later, Michael celebrates his birthday with Wendy, John, and Mary. Wendy receives a phone call and hears the same music that was heard in Peter's original call.

== Cast ==
- Megan Placito as Wendy Darling
- Martin Portlock as Peter Pan
  - Oscar Hastings as young Peter
- Kit Green as Timmy Carter / Tinker Bell
  - Holden M N Smith as young Timmy
- Peter DeSouza-Feighoney as Michael Darling
- Teresa Banham as Dr. Mary Darling
- Olumide Olorunfemi as Tiger Lily
- Campbell Wallace as John Darling
- Nicholas Woodeson as Steven
- Hardy Yusuf as Joey
- Charity Kase as James Hook
  - Lucas Allermann as young James
- Kierston Wareing as Roxanne Hook

Additionally, Eddy MacKenzie, who portrayed Piglet in Winnie-the-Pooh: Blood and Honey 2, appears as Lee, a party storekeeper who is murdered by Peter. Kelly Rian Sanson, Nicola Wright and Jay Robertson, who appeared as Mia, Daphne Robin and Officer Daughtry in the same film respectively, make brief appearances reprising their roles.

== Production ==
=== Development ===
In November 2022, a live-action horror film based on J. M. Barrie's Peter Pan was announced to be in development for ITN Studios and Jagged Edge Productions with the title Peter Pan's Neverland Nightmare, with Rhys Frake-Waterfield producing. The film was written and directed by Scott Chambers. Originally, Frake-Waterfield planned to direct after directing both Winnie-the-Pooh: Blood and Honey (2023) and its sequel, though he eventually handed over control to Chambers after realising the potential of Pinocchio Unstrung due to the concept involving puppetry, which he was "obsessed" with. In February 2023, the producers revealed that it would be set in the same continuity as Winnie-the-Pooh: Blood and Honey and its sequel. Chambers revealed in June 2024 that the film would tonally be "extremely darker" than the Blood and Honey films, dealing with themes of child abduction.

=== Writing ===
The original draft of the film, written by Scott Chambers and Matt Leslie, took a much more traditional approach to the original source material, with a majority of the film set in Neverland. The synopsis for the idea was: "A malevolent Peter Pan steals the souls of people—leaving them comatose—and traps their spirits in a realm called Neverland as his Lost Souls which prevent him from aging." However, when Chambers went to budgeting, he eventually grew worried that he wouldn't be able to achieve it to a high standard, especially as filming on Winnie-the-Pooh: Blood and Honey 2 had proven to be quite difficult. Determined to avoid similar issues, Chambers decided to rework the script himself. Chambers has since then expressed interest in recycling the script for a potential sequel film.

When looking into the original source material, the main things Chambers thought about were Peter Pan, Tinker Bell and the Lost Boys. As he found the premise of Peter Pan climbing into bedrooms and taking children to Neverland quite creepy, he decided to take the story into a darker, more serious, grounded direction. Chambers admitted the original script was more "crazy" and "wacky", though he eventually decided against it as he felt he would have made a "very weird film". Inspiration from other films included French Cinema, High Tension, The Black Phone and Hounds of Love. As an actor in addition to being a producer, Chambers aimed for a character-driven story with Peter Pan's Neverland Nightmare, avoiding certain character stereotypes such as "the drunk, the bitch, the slut". Wendy Darling was written as a more realistic, flawed character, having a strained relationship with her mother due to her wishing to move to London with her boyfriend in spite of her mother's wish for her to attend university. Among the additions Chambers also wanted were more contained locations and fewer death scenes to make the film easier to shoot. Timmy Carter/Tinker Bell was originally planned to be a "heavily obese" recovering drug addict, yet the idea was scrapped. When developing the character, Chambers wondered why Pan would keep her around instead of murdering her. He came up with the premise of Tinker Bell being a trans woman who was abducted by Peter as a child and, as Peter could not send her to Neverland due to her identifying as a girl, manipulated into becoming his partner. As a person from the LGBT community himself, Chambers added in a scene where Michael Darling and his best friend Joey hold hands, implying a potential romance among them. After the film was completed, studio executives requested the scene's removal, yet Chambers chose to leave it in.

Another reason for the film's dark tone was to make Peter Pan a truly malicious character. "I need you to feel a certain way about Peter Pan," Chambers explained. "By the time we get to Poohniverse, because I need you to just not like him, I need you to be against him from the get-go. Because when he goes into the arena with, for example, Pooh, I need you to look at Pooh like he's not all too bad."

=== Casting ===
By January 2024, Martin Portlock, Megan Placito, Kit Green, Peter DeSouza-Feighoney, and Charity Kase were cast as Peter Pan, Wendy Darling, Tinker Bell, Michael Darling, and Captain James Hook, respectively. During the casting process, Scott Chambers did not have a lot of money, and struggled to find the right actors for each role. Even after finding a good candidate, he had them audition twice and took them in any direction to see if they could take it. Two hundred actors auditioned for the role of Peter Pan, yet many of the audition tapes just "played evil". Eventually, a makeup artist assistant requested Martin Portlock, and Chambers decided to audition Portlock after seeing his headshot. Around the time, Portlock was working on another film named The Realm of Eldervin (previously titled Gallowmere). Upon reading the script for the first time, Portlock was shocked about his version of the character being a child snatcher. After the audition tape, Chambers talked to Portlock on the phone for an hour to discuss him wearing prosthetics throughout the film, and to his relief, Portlock was okay with it. Preparation for the character took over two to three months. As a father of three children, Portlock wondered how he would feel if one of his children were to be kidnapped, and researched into the mindset of child abductors.

Megan Placito was only fresh out of drama school around the time of auditioning for Wendy Darling. Around the time, the script hadn't actually been developed yet, so several lines from Midsommar were used for the audition. Placito at one point planned to watch the 1953 animated Disney film as inspiration, but eventually decided not to fill connection with Disney's version of Wendy Darling, as she believed that her version of the character was her own. The role of Michael Darling was written specifically with Peter De-Souza-Feighoney in mind (having played an adolescent Winnie-the-Pooh in Winnie-the-Pooh: Blood and Honey 2), and no audition was made. In an effort to honour the spirit of the original character, DeSouza-Feighoney watched several other Peter Pan adaptations without "even needing to put a horror twist on it". Chambers requested him to just be himself, being "naturally quiet and stuff," while honouring the spirit of the other Michael Darlings. The role of Timmy Carter/Tinker Bell was the hardest to cast, as Chambers wanted a woman from the LGBT community for the role, and was dissatisfied and stressed with many of the auditions to the point where he began considering rewriting the character until finding Kit Green. Green wanted to keep the "sort of lightness and this sort of magicalness" of the original character, that "she could dream and she could believe things and she wasn't just a victim."

By June 2024, Nicholas Woodeson, Kierston Wareing, Teresa Banham, Olumide Olorunfemi, and Campbell Wallace were added to the cast. Banham reprised her role from Winnie-the-Pooh: Blood and Honey 2 as Christopher Robin's hypnotherapist Mary Darling.

=== Filming ===
Principal photography for Peter Pan's Neverland Nightmare was originally planned to commence in January 2024, instead of Bambi: The Reckoning. However, as the script wasn't ready around the time, the filming dates for both projects were switched around, with Bambi: The Reckoning being filmed first instead. Filming began on 9 May 2024 in London, which Chambers confirmed via his social media. Out of all the films in The Twisted Childhood Universe, Peter Pan's Neverland Nightmare was the least stressful to film, as no problems happened on set, no crew members quit the project, and everyone on the set overall had a great time. Throughout filming, the crew experimented with the use of green colours and shadows as a homage to the original source material.

In the opening sequence in which Peter Pan murders Roxanne and kidnaps James, Chambers had originally intended for Pan to greet James from in a letterbox, and entice him into letting him inside the house. However, when he noticed that the house they used for filming had a trapdoor in the floorboards, he decided to use it and have Pan approach from the floorboards instead. This led many people to believe the idea was taken from It (2017). An abandoned boys' school was used for the scenes in Peter Pan's manor, which the set designers had visited before and was rumoured to be haunted. All the scenes within were shot during the day, so the crew had to do whatever they could to make it seem like it was dark, such as blackening out the windows or using miniature tents made of blackout. The most difficult part was that some rooms were several stories high, meaning they couldn't get the lights through the window. One particular scene that the crew weren't satisfied with was the scene in which Peter Pan abducts Michael Darling. Originally, Peter was supposed to lure Michael into his van claiming he had a drone with him after learning that Michael wanted one for his birthday. The reason why this was reshot was because many of the child extras didn't show up for filming, and they were unable to create a "chaotic" scene that would happen after school like it was scripted. This was the only scene reshot throughout the entire film.

The film was produced by Jagged Edge Productions in association with ITN Studios for a budget of £250,000–£310,000.

== Music ==
Peter Pan's Neverland Nightmare (Original Motion Picture Soundtrack)

Soundtrack album by Greg Birkumshaw
- Released: 10 July 2025
- Genre: Horror
- Length: 73:23
- Label: ITN Studios

Peter Pan's Neverland Nightmare (Original Motion Picture Soundtrack) is the soundtrack album for the film. Greg Birkumshaw composed the film's score. The soundtrack was released by ITN Studios on 10 July 2025.

All music is composed by Greg Birkumshaw.

No.	Title	Length
1.	"The Thing About Neverland"	2:08
2.	"Pan in the Ring"	1:50
3.	"The Taking of Tiny Hook (Pt. 1)"	3:28
4.	"The Taking of Tiny Hook (Pt. 2)"	2:17
5.	"To Die Would Be, An Awfully Big Adventure"	1:02
6.	"Costume Shopping"	2:18
7.	"Michael's Abduction"	3:25
8.	"The Little Boys Room"	2:06
9.	"First Game of Marco Polo"	4:15
10.	"Pan Reminiscing About Mother"	3:44
11.	"Tink's Childhood Home"	0:56
12.	"The Boys on the Bus"	3:52
13.	"John Has News"	1:34
14.	"Pan's Delusion"	2:39
15.	"Pan in Da House (Pt. 1)"	0:54
16.	"Pan in Da House (Pt. 2)"	0:55
17.	"Family Murders"	4:57
18.	"Castration"	6:05
19.	"Fairy Helpful"	5:20
20.	"Joey Found"	5:00
21.	"Hooked"	5:54
22.	"Wendy vs Pan"	3:47
23.	"The Phone Call"	1:27
24.	"Never to Neverland (credits)"	3:02
25.	"Pan's Calling Card"	0:28
26.	"La estoy Regando feat. Nikki Clan from (The Casagrandes Movie: Songs From and Inspired by the Original Motion Picture)"	3:05
27.	"Tsitakuarhu K'uiripi (Pirekua) feat. Julia Cristina Cruz and Marisol Paz from (The Casagrandes Movie: Songs From and Inspired by the Original Motion Picture) (credits)"	3:15
Total length:		73:23

== Release ==
Peter Pan's Neverland Nightmare was theatrically released in the United States by Iconic Events Releasing on 13 January 2025, and in the United Kingdom by Altitude Film Distribution on 24 February.

=== Home media ===
The film was released digitally on Amazon Prime in the United States on 13 May 2025.

On 7 October it was released on DVD exclusively at Wal-Mart by Shout! Factory.

== Reception ==
=== Box office ===
Peter Pan's Neverland Nightmare grossed $1.6 million in the United States, the Netherlands, Australia, Bulgaria, Mexico, Colombia, Spain, and Russia.

=== Critical response ===
On the review aggregator website Rotten Tomatoes, 39% of 23 critics' reviews are positive, with an average rating of 5.1/10. The website's consensus reads: "Continuing the trend of schlocky puerile remakes, Peter Pan's Neverland Nightmare guts a beloved character for low-brow horror that never manages to take flight." Metacritic, which uses a weighted average, assigned the film a score of 50 out of 100, based on 4 critics, indicating "mixed or average" reviews.

Dennis Harvey of Variety viewed the film as a "stylish great-leap-forward" from the director's "prior behind-camera stints", writing, "Whether "Nightmare" will remain a surprisingly artful aberration within a generally despised subgenre, or prove a harbinger of that category's ongoing redemption, is anyone's guess. Thank goodness J.M. Barrie is long dead, because this movie would surely kill him." Grant Hermanns of ScreenRant praised the film's direction, the visual style and the performances, though he felt the film "often plays itself too straight".

Matt Donato of IGN gave the film a negative review, criticizing the screenplay and direction. He concluded his review by writing, "Peter Pan's Neverland Nightmare might be bleak and gory, but more notably, it's a dull adaption of Peter Pan's adventures that make him no different then a thousand other van-driving murderers who've come and gone before." John Serba of Decider viewed the film's tone as "Terrifier-derived, which therefor classifies Neverland Nightmare as miserable shit. Peter Pan and Wendy is good. Hook is not."

=== Accolades ===
Award	Date of ceremony	Category	Nominee	Result	Ref.
National Film Awards UK	July 3, 2025	Best Actress	Megan Placito	Won	
National Film Awards UK	July 3, 2025	Best Actor	Martin Portlock	Won	
National Film Awards UK	July 3, 2025	Best Supporting Actor	Peter DeSouza-Feighoney	Nominated	
National Film Awards UK	July 3, 2025	Best Supporting Actress	Kit Green	Nominated	
National Film Awards UK	July 3, 2025	Best Thriller	Peter Pan's Neverland Nightmare	Nominated	
National Film Awards UK	July 3, 2025	Best Director	Scott Chambers	Nominated	

== Potential sequel ==
In January 2025, director Scott Chambers announced plans for a sequel, acknowledging that the film needs to perform well at the box office before the project can be officially green-lit. He also stated that although the original film presents Neverland as a drug-induced hallucination by Peter Pan, the sequel will reveal that Neverland is a real place.
