= Roughnecks (TV series) =

- Genre: Drama
- Created by: Kieran Prendiville
- Written by: Kieran Prendiville; Steve Coombes; Bryan Elsley; Dave Robinson; Alan Whiting
- Directed by: Sandy Johnson; Aisling Walsh
- Starring: Liam Cunningham; George Rossi; Francesca Hunt; Bruce Jones; John McGlynn; James Cosmo; Ashley Jensen; Clive Russell; Alec Westwood; Teresa Banham; Ricky Tomlinson; Paul Copley; Anne Raitt; Colum Convey; Hywel Simons; Stuart Duncan
- Composers: Mike Post; Roger Neill
- Country of origin: United Kingdom
- Original language: English
- No. of series: 2
- No. of episodes: 13

Production
- Executive producer: Michael Wearing
- Producers: Moira Williams; Charles Elton
- Production locations: Aberdeenshire, Scotland
- Cinematography: Hubert Taczanowski; John Daly
- Editors: Bryan Oates; Don Fairservice
- Running time: 50 minutes
- Production company: First Choice Productions

Original release
- Network: BBC1
- Release: 16 June 1994 – 21 December 1995

Roughnecks is a British television drama series, created and principally written by former Tomorrow's World presenter Kieran Prendiville, that first broadcast on BBC1 on 16 June 1994. Produced by First Choice Productions, Roughnecks ran for two series, with the final episode broadcasting on 21 December 1995. The series centres on the working and personal lives of the crew of the fictional oil rig "The Osprey Explorer" in the North Sea. Offshore filming was undertaken on the oil rig Dan Countess, which was not in use at the time.

The cast, included Liam Cunningham, Teresa Banham, James Cosmo, Bruce Jones, Clive Russell, Ricky Tomlinson, Paul Copley and Ashley Jensen. The main theme was written and composed by American television composer Mike Post. An official guide to the series, written by Tom McGregor and featuring interviews with the cast and crew, was published on 29 September 1995, prior to the broadcast of the second series. Neither series has been made available on DVD.

== Cast ==
Cast listed as per order of credits in the opening title sequence

- Liam Cunningham as Chris Brennan
- George Rossi as Kevin Lamb
- Francesca Hunt as Hilary Whiteson
- Bruce Jones as Terry Morrell
- John McGlynn as Drew MacAllister
- James Cosmo as Tom Butcher
- Ashley Jensen as Heather Butcher (née Brennan)
- Clive Russell as Archie McGrandle
- Alec Westwood as Davey Rains
- Teresa Banham as Tessa Buckingham
- Ricky Tomlinson as Douglas "Cinders" Hudson
- Paul Copley as Ian Pollard
- Anne Raitt as Izzy Butcher
- Colum Convey as Graeme "Ceefax" Revell
- Hywel Simons as Wilf "Village" Granelle
- Katy Murphy as Cath (Series 2)
- Martin Wenner as Edvard Bergman (Series 2)
- John Kazek as Telegram Sam (Series 1)
- Bruce Jamieson as Burgess (series 1)

== Episodes ==
=== Series 1 (1994) ===
No. overall	No. in series	Title	Directed by	Written by	Original release date
1	1	"Episode 1"	Sandy Johnson	Kieran Prendiville	16 June 1994
As the crew are flown across the North Sea to the hazardous world of an exploration rig, they are distressed to find that a colleague has died suddenly of a massive heart attack under mysterious circumstances. Meanwhile, a strike is threatened when a wallet goes missing.
2	2	"Episode 2"	Sandy Johnson	Kieran Prendiville	23 June 1994
Tessa, the new female mechanic, creates a stir on the rig and helps an oilman's widow to come to terms with her grief. Meanwhile, the stakes are high as a team from the Osprey Explorer challenge the crew of another rig to a quiz.
3	3	"Episode 3"	Sandy Johnson	Kieran Prendiville	30 June 1994
When they get shore leave, the crew of Osprey Explorer pick up the pieces of their private lives. Archie rushes to the hospital where his ex-wife has been taken after a car crash. Ian and Hilary have a great day walking in the Highlands but later face a problem over their relationship. Tom is worried because his daughter Heather is spending too much time with Chris – a playboy twice her age.
4	4	"Episode 4"	Sandy Johnson	Kieran Prendiville	7 July 1994
A journalist is flown on to the Osprey Explorer, putting Chris in the spotlight.
5	5	"Episode 5"	Sandy Johnson	Kieran Prendiville	14 July 1994
While Tom and Izzy's worse fears for Heather are realised, something is wrong on the Osprey.
6	6	"Episode 6"	Sandy Johnson	Kieran Prendiville	21 July 1994
Dawn breaks and the stunned survivors wait on Osprey for news of their missing mates. Someone is responsible for the accident and the fingers point at the driller. Why isn't Chris there to defend himself?

=== Series 2 (1995) ===
No. overall	No. in series	Title	Directed by	Written by	Original release date
7	1	"Episode 1"	Aisling Walsh	Kieran Prendiville	9 November 1995
The crew return to the Osprey Explorer for the first time since their colleague Ian's death.
8	2	"Episode 2"	Aisling Walsh	Kieran Prendiville	16 November 1995
The crew are held at gunpoint in the coffee shack by a group of masked men. As tempers rise, Cinders is transformed into a reluctant hero.
9	3	"Episode 3"	Aisling Walsh	Steve Coombes & Dave Robinson	23 November 1995
There's an outbreak of gambling on the Osprey and a young steward soon finds himself addicted. Cinders, a reformed gambler, decides to teach him a lesson – but who pays dearest in the end?
10	4	"Episode 4"	Aisling Walsh	Steve Coombes & Dave Robinson	30 November 1995
Following a crane accident on the rig, Archie and Village must face a full-scale enquiry. Heather is quite taken with Chris's long-lost brother.
11	5	"Episode 5"	Aisling Walsh	Alan Whiting	7 December 1995
Pressure testing problems cause trouble on the Osprey and tension mounts when some of the crew are forced to take a five per cent pay cut. Cinders is furious and sparks are flying at Greenacres too, where Izzy walks out leaving Tom in charge of the boarding house.
12	6	"Episode 6"	Ailsing Walsh	Alan Whiting	14 December 1995
Love is in the air as the promise of romance touches several of the crew.
13	7	"Episode 7"	Aisling Walsh	Brian Elsley	21 December 1995
After an accident on the rig, work stops and the crew takes a break in Norway.
