= Diarmuid Byron-O'Connor =

British artist (born 1964)

- Born: 7 December 1964 (age 61)
- Education: The John Fisher School
- Known for: Sculpture
- Notable work: Chelsea School of Art

Diarmuid Byron-O'Connor (born 7 December 1964) is a British artist, best known for his sculpture.

He attended the John Fisher School in Purley, with presenter Matthew Wright. In 1984, he started at art college in Bristol. In 1986 he joined "Changing Places", a community and environmental arts project, as a stone carver – leaving in 1988. In 1991 he studied conceptual fine art at Chelsea School of Art, London.

Starting a decorating firm, Byron-O'Connor worked evenings sculpting with wax at home. He was commissioned to create a statue of Peter Pan to stand outside Great Ormond Street Hospital which was given the rights to the character by creator J. M. Barrie. Following the unveiling of this work and an exhibition of small bronzes in 2000, he built a studio for private commissions. In 2005 he added a scale statue of Tinker Bell to the one of Peter Pan, unveiled by the Countess of Wessex.

Byron-O'Connor's research into World War I led to him designing sets for BBC2's The Trench; BBC1's The Somme - From Defeat to Victory; and the Discovery Channel's Mud, Blood, and Tarmac. Whilst working on the set for BBC One's The Crafty Tricks of War he was asked to co present the series with Dick Strawbridge. He subsequently made Geronimo with Fearne Cotton for BBC1.

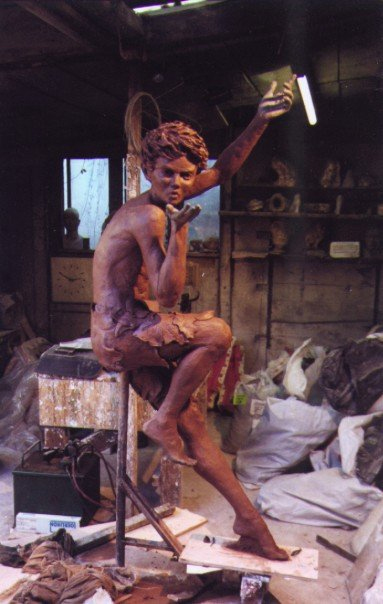
The clay Peter Pan

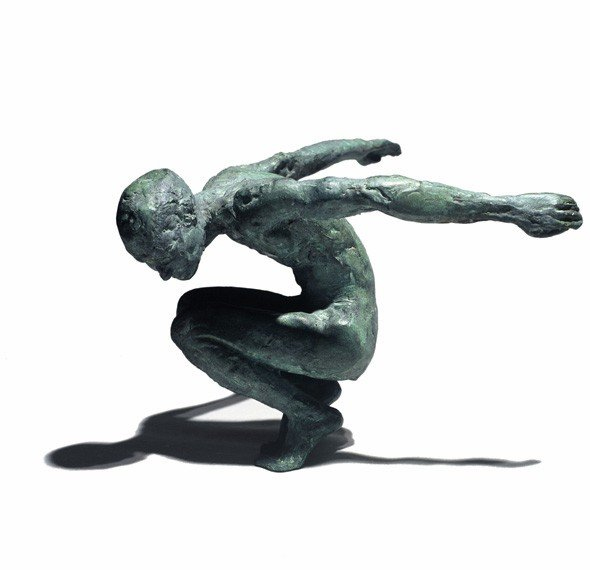
Icarus by Byron-O'Connor

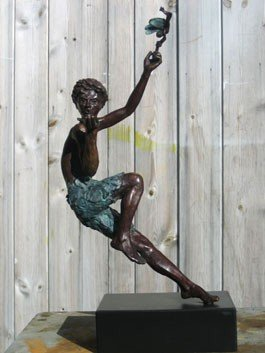
Peter Pan limited edition]

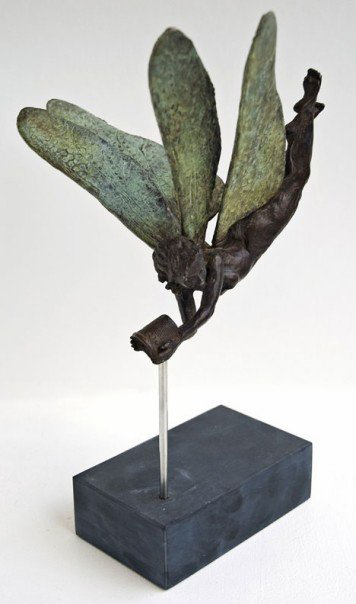
150 Limited edition bronze for Great Ormond Street Hospital
