= Bambi: The Reckoning =

2025 natural horror film by Dan Allen

- Theatrical release poster
- Directed by: Dan Allen
- Screenplay by: Rhys Warrington
- Based on: Bambi, a Life in the Woods by Felix Salten
- Produced by: Rhys Frake-Waterfield; Scott Chambers
- Starring: Roxanne McKee; Tom Mulheron; Nicola Wright; Adrian Relph; Russell Geoffrey Banks; Samira Mighty
- Cinematography: Vince Knight
- Edited by: Dan Allen
- Music by: Greg Birkumshaw
- Production companies: Jagged Edge Productions; ITN Distribution
- Distributed by: Altitude Film Distribution
- Release dates: 25 July 2025 (United States); 15 August 2025 (United Kingdom)
- Running time: 80 minutes
- Country: United Kingdom
- Language: English
- Budget: £250,000–£325,000
- Box office: $1,085,640

Bambi: The Reckoning is a 2025 British independent natural horror film edited and directed by Dan Allen, and written by Rhys Warrington. It is the fourth instalment in The Twisted Childhood Universe (TCU) and is a horror retelling of the 1923 novel Bambi, a Life in the Woods. The film stars Roxanne McKee, Tom Mulheron, Nicola Wright, Samira Mighty, Adrian Relph, Alex Cooke, Russell Geoffrey Banks, and Joseph Greenwood. It follows a mother and her son who become hunted by Bambi after his own mother's death.

First announced in November 2022 as a Bambi-based horror film, the film was subsequently revealed to be set in the TCU shared continuity. Scott Chambers intended on directing, though Dan Allen was eventually hired to direct while Chambers chose to direct Peter Pan's Neverland Nightmare instead, as he felt the latter fit his style better. It started production in London on 6 January 2024 and wrapped twenty days later.

Bambi: The Reckoning was released in theatres in the United States on 25 July 2025, and in the United Kingdom on 15 August. The film has grossed $1,085,640 worldwide and marked a critical milestone for its franchise. While it received mixed reviews overall, it became the first instalment in the Twisted Childhood Universe (TCU) to secure a baseline of 10 generally positive reviews, outnumbering its 7 negative reviews from critics at the time of tracking.

== Plot ==
In the past, a young fawn named Bambi lives happily with his mother until a hunter kills her. Bambi grows up alone; he meets a doe named Faline, who becomes his mate and gives birth to a fawn. They teach their offspring about the world including the dangers. However, Faline is fatally run over by a truck carrying toxic waste from a local pharmaceutical company, Wilbexr Pharmaceuticals, and Bambi's offspring disappears in a panic. Bambi gets knocked unconscious by a Wilbexr technician with a spade, before waking up to find Faline completely lifeless. Devastated, Bambi drinks contaminated water from a river, which mutates him into a ravenous creature, determined to get his revenge.

In the present, Xana and her son Benji take a taxi to visit Xana's husband Simon and his family—his dementia-stricken mother Mary, his brothers Andrew and Joshua, Andrew's wife Harriet, and their teenage son Harrison—although Simon cannot arrive due to work schedules. On the way, Bambi attacks the taxi and kills the driver while Xana and Benji manage to reach Mary's house.

Meanwhile, Michael, Tyler, and Eddie, three hunters hired by Wilbexr, prepare to hunt Bambi. During a debate of what to do about the cab driver, Joshua decides to go investigate. He leaves the house only to be accidentally shot dead by Tyler. Harrison bullies Benji and Mary, the latter of whom starts acting strange, knows Bambi's name, and has made several drawings of a deer around the house. Bambi attacks the house and tears Harriet in half, forcing the family to flee to a caravan. They drive into the forest and manage to lose him. The three hunters discover the home and find Harriet, still alive, whom Michael euthanises. Meanwhile, the family find a log blocking the way. Andrew and Harrison try to remove it, but Benji panics upon seeing Bambi and drives off with only Xana and Mary inside; Andrew is accidentally dragged behind them to his death on the road. Harrison flees from Bambi and gets lost in the forest, where he is caught in a trap and mauled to death by a group of mutated rabbits.

Xana, Benji, and Mary abandon the caravan after it runs out of petrol, run from Bambi again, and find Michael, who takes them to a den where they meet Simon and his co-worker Jo. Simon reveals himself as the one who killed Faline and dumped toxins into the river, causing the local fauna to mutate, including Bambi. During the conversation, Benji finds a garage where Tyler and Eddie have caged and mistreat a young fawn. Xana also learns that Simon not only hired the hunters to capture and eliminate the mutated animals to cover up Wilbexr's crimes, but also plans to trap Bambi and kill him, not caring how many lives may be lost along the way. Tyler goes to urinate and ends up being decapitated by Bambi. When Eddie goes to investigate, Bambi rips off his legs and his head.

Benji frees the fawn and runs away; Xana and Simon go after him while Mary encounters Bambi, who tries to kill her. Jo sacrifices herself and shoots a gas canister to kill Bambi, but he survives. Benji eventually reunites with Xana and Simon, only for Michael to arrive as well, threatening them at gunpoint and demands the fawn. Bambi drags Michael into the forest before approaching Benji. Simon abandons Xana and Benji and tries to flee, but gets killed by a mutant rabbit inside his car. Realizing the fawn is Bambi's offspring, Xana and Benji return it to him. However, a bloodied Michael arrives and fatally shoots Bambi, only to get shot dead by Mary, who has recovered from her dementia. Bambi bleeds out in front of Xana, Benji, and his fawn, which howls out in grief.

== Cast ==
- Roxanne McKee as Xana
- Tom Mulheron as Benji
- Nicola Wright as Mary
- Samira Mighty as Harriet
- Adrian Relph as Michael, also referred as the man
- Alex Cooke as Simon
- Russell Geoffrey Banks as Andrew
- Joseph Greenwood as Harrison
- Catherine Adams as Jo
- Ewan Borthwick as Eddie
- David Ambler as Rob
- Luke Cavendish as Joshua
- Big Tobz as Tyler

== Production ==
=== Development ===
In November 2022, a live-action horror film based on Bambi, a Life in the Woods by Felix Salten was announced as being in development with the title Bambi: The Reckoning. Dan Allen was named as director, with Rhys Frake-Waterfield serving as a producer. Originally, Scott Chambers planned to direct, before stepping down to direct Peter Pan's Neverland Nightmare instead, as he felt it was more of his type. The film was produced by Jagged Edge Productions. Chambers described the film as "an incredibly dark retelling of the 1928 story we all know and love. Finding inspiration from the design used in Netflix's The Ritual, Bambi would be a vicious killing machine that lurks in the wilderness." The film is set in the same continuity as Winnie-the-Pooh: Blood and Honey (2023) and its sequel, being teased in the latter film. Allen revealed that the film would be themed around "the death of childhoods as much as its gonna ruin childhoods," and would feature "bloodshed, tears and rabbits... and one mean killer deer."

Allen stated that the team knew they wanted Bambi: The Reckoning to be an "emotional film", as they felt it fitted the source text perfectly; the titular character loses his mother in the original novel. They aimed to create a film themed around "the loss of innocence", with for example the character Benji "realising his parents aren't superheroes and realising the world is a much darker place than he thought," while at the same time making "a big fun monster movie." Allen envisioned the film as a "sequel" to the original book, with Bambi shown to have a mate and offspring around the time of the opening sequence before losing them both. Inspiration came from Jurassic Park (of which Allen was a massive fan of) and The Ritual. One particular sequence where the character Harriet runs across the front garden with Bambi behind her in slow-motion was inspired by The Host. Allen additionally wanted to expand on the original novel's environmental message, having the hunters in the film embody "the mistreatment of nature" and the "disregard for it". Discussing the film's tone, Allen and cinematographer Vince Knight described it as "somewhere in the middle" between the Winnie-the-Pooh: Blood and Honey films (known for their campy and fun style) and Peter Pan's Neverland Nightmare (known for its dark and serious tone), while leaning "a bit more, you know, towards Peter Pan side". Despite its dark and gritty nature, Allen expressed that the film still had some comedic moments, as "you can't make Bambi killing people and ripping people's heads off without having a bit of a strong, like, wink to the audience and be like, 'We know what this is,' you know." The film's screenplay was written by Rhys Warrington.

=== Casting ===
On 15 December 2023, Roxanne McKee, Nicola Wright, Tom Mulheron and Samira Mighty joined the cast. Allen noted that Wright joined the project before he was hired to direct. Mighty originally auditioned for the role of Xana, but was deemed "too young". On 18 December, Joseph Greenwood revealed that he was cast as Harrison. Around the time of auditioning, Greenwood was unaware that Jagged Edge Productions was the same studio behind Winnie-the-Pooh: Blood and Honey until being informed by the public. Upon realising this, Greenwood knew that what he had signed on to was a "much bigger thing than [he] had initially realised."

=== Filming ===
Principal photography was originally slated to commence on 31 January 2023 in London, England, with Vince Knight serving as cinematographer, after working on Blood and Honey. Filming was later rescheduled to begin on 6 January 2024 in England, which Chambers confirmed via his social media. Originally, it was planned for Bambi: The Reckoning to be shot in April, with Peter Pan's Neverland Nightmare being shot in January instead. However, script issues saw the filming dates for both projects switched around. While filming, Chambers spent time writing the script for Neverland Nightmare. Filming wrapped on 26 January 2024.

Crew members have considered Bambi: The Reckoning to be the hardest to film, mainly due to the nightly shoots in January. Where the crew wanted to shoot, it was too muddy and sloshy to get the equipment there, and where they could, it was too frozen. Allen stated that they were lucky it didn't rain during filming as "otherwise, continuity would've been all over the place". To help solve the problem, it was decided to have the actors wear coats for a majority of the film. However, upon reviewing initial footage, the production team ended up reducing the amount of coat usage. The crew was influenced by Jurassic Park for the film's lighting. For the scene in which Bambi flips the taxi over, a stunt team used both punitive pistons and an additional car mounted inside a massive tube that rolled on a motor, while a camera was attached to a roll rig. The actors reportedly disliked filming the scene. Mulheron enjoyed the scene involving an explosion, even claiming to have actually felt it while shooting.

=== Visual effects ===
Unlike in The Twisted Childhood Universe's previous films, which were made using practical effects, the animals in Bambi: The Reckoning were made using entirely computer-generated imagery. Stephanie Bellgardt, head of Boiling Point Media, designed the model for Bambi. The VFX team was inspired by various quadrupedal creatures, including Moder from The Ritual (something Chambers himself had intended) for Bambi's spine. They intentionally avoided making him a "zombie deer" and wanted him to still feel like a living, breathing creature. This involved tearing apart the model a little; to make the deer seem as if it had been through "many battles and wars," while also preventing it from looking undead. The crew had wanted more practical effects for the deer, though due to budget reasons and the design for Bambi not being completed in time for filming, they ended up with merely a stand-in hoof and two stand-in heads. Other tricks were pulled off additionally. For example, during a scene where the character Xana comes face-to-face with Bambi, a large reflector was wafted near the actress's face to portrays the deer breathing. Allen confessed he feared that the film would end up being "the next Birdemic" if the VFX was not done right.

== Music ==
Bambi: The Reckoning (Original Motion Picture Soundtrack)

Soundtrack album by Greg Birkumshaw
- Released: 15 August 2025
- Genre: Horror
- Length: 65:35
- Labels: ITN Studios and Wiggins Media Group Worldwide

Bambi: The Reckoning (Original Motion Picture Soundtrack) is the soundtrack album for the film. Greg Birkumshaw composed the film's score. The soundtrack was released by ITN Studios and Wiggins Media Group Worldwide on 15 August 2025.

All music is composed by Greg Birkumshaw.

No.	Title	Length
1.	"In the Middle of a Thicket"	2:16
2.	"The Hunters"	2:11
3.	"Through the Woods"	1:06
4.	"Discovering the Accident"	2:28
5.	"Antlers"	0:57
6.	"Painting on the Landing"	2:46
7.	"The Chases"	9:50
8.	"She's Half the Woman She Used to Be"	1:22
9.	"Dragged Kicking and Screaming"	3:53
10.	"Shitfaced"	2:23
11.	"Missing Mary"	1:19
12.	"The Rampant Rabid Rabbits Wreak Revenge"	1:42
13.	"Bambi's Dinner Plate"	1:54
14.	"The Hunter's Lair"	3:09
15.	"Bambi Bambino"	4:06
16.	"Hunter Looses His Head"	3:09
17.	"Family Reunion"	2:25
18.	"Window Service"	2:30
19.	"Remember Me – Sam Ellwood & Lukas Pentland"	0:55
20.	"Explosion"	3:33
21.	"Parents Evening"	7:17
22.	"Reckoning the Credits"	4:24
23.	"Estas Aquí feat. Carla Merchant from (The Casagrandes Movie: Songs From and Inspired by the Original Motion Picture) / Credits"	5:02
Total length:		65:35

== Release ==
Bambi: The Reckoning was released in theatres in the United States on 25 July 2025 by ITN Distribution with Seismic Releasing, and in the United Kingdom on 15 August by Altitude Film Distribution. The film was originally set to be released in late 2024. The film was released on VOD platforms, including Amazon Prime, on 29 August.

It received a streaming release on Peacock on 27 March 2026.

== Reception ==
=== Box office ===
Bambi: The Reckoning grossed $668,717 in the United States, $361,843 in various international territories, and $55,080 in the United Kingdom, for a worldwide total of $1,085,640.

=== Critical response ===
On the review aggregator website Rotten Tomatoes, 59% of 17 critics' reviews are positive, with an average rating of 5.7/10. Metacritic, which uses a weighted average, assigned the film a score of 50 out of 100, based on 1 critics, indicating "mixed or average" reviews.

Matt Donato described the film as "an audaciously bloody but distractingly humourless creature feature", though he viewed it as one of the TCU's better films. Aaron Gillingham praised the special effects but criticised the characterisation, stating "I realise compelling writing and strong characters aren't what most people watch these films for, but it would be nice for a change to get bold characters that don't just adhere to exaggerated stereotypes, something which this film tries and fails at more than one occasion."

=== Accolades ===
Award	Date of ceremony	Category	Nominee	Result	Ref
Independent Horror Movie Awards	January 8, 2026	Best Director	Dan Allen	Nominated	
Independent Horror Movie Awards	January 8, 2026	Best Editing	Dan Allen	Nominated	
Independent Horror Movie Awards	January 8, 2026	Best Cinematography	Vince Knight	Won	
Independent Horror Movie Awards	January 8, 2026	Best Special Effects	Bambi: The Reckoning	Won	
Independent Horror Movie Awards	January 8, 2026	Best Atmosphere	Bambi: The Reckoning	Won	
Independent Horror Movie Awards	January 8, 2026	Best Sound	Bambi: The Reckoning	Won	
Independent Horror Movie Awards	January 8, 2026	Best Music	Bambi: The Reckoning	Nominated	
Independent Horror Movie Awards	January 8, 2026	Best Feature	Bambi: The Reckoning	Won	
Independent Horror Movie Awards	January 8, 2026	Best Gore	Bambi: The Reckoning	Won	
Independent Horror Movie Awards	January 8, 2026	Best Kill	Bambi: The Reckoning	Won	
