= Winnie-the-Pooh: Blood and Honey 2 =

2024 British independent horror film

- Theatrical release poster
- Directed by: Rhys Frake-Waterfield
- Screenplay by: Matt Leslie
- Story by: Rhys Frake-Waterfield; Matt Leslie
- Based on: Winnie-the-Pooh by: A. A. Milne; E. H. Shepard
- Produced by: Rhys Frake-Waterfield; Scott Chambers (Note: Credited as Scott Jeffrey.)
- Starring: Scott Chambers; Tallulah Evans; Ryan Oliva; Teresa Banham; Nicola Wright; Alec Newman; Simon Callow
- Cinematography: Vince Knight
- Edited by: Dan Allen; Rhys Frake-Waterfield
- Music by: Andrew Scott Bell
- Production companies: Jagged Edge Productions; ITN Distribution
- Distributed by: Altitude Film Distribution
- Release dates: 18 March 2024 (London); 7 June 2024 (United Kingdom)
- Running time: 93 minutes
- Country: United Kingdom
- Language: English
- Budget: $500,000
- Box office: $7.6 million

Winnie-the-Pooh: Blood and Honey 2 (stylised as Winnie-the-Pooh: Blood and Honey II) is a 2024 British slasher film directed by Rhys Frake-Waterfield. It is the second instalment of The Twisted Childhood Universe (TCU) and a metafictional sequel to Winnie-the-Pooh: Blood and Honey (2023). Like its predecessor, it is a horror interpretation of A. A. Milne and E. H. Shepard's Winnie-the-Pooh books. The independent film stars Scott Chambers as Christopher Robin, and Ryan Oliva as the titular character, with Tallulah Evans, Teresa Banham, Peter DeSouza-Feighoney, Alec Newman, and Simon Callow in supporting roles. It follows Pooh as he embarks on a murderous rampage through Christopher Robin's childhood town to seek revenge on him for revealing his existence to the world.

Following the commercial success of Blood and Honey, director Frake-Waterfield expressed interest in a sequel, which was greenlit in November 2022. The film utilizes metafictional and film within a film elements as Chambers, Oliva, and Eddy McKenzie replace original cast members Nikolai Leon, Craig David Dowsett, and Chris Cordell in the roles of Christopher Robin, Winnie-the-Pooh, and Piglet, respectively. (Note: Winnie-the-Pooh: Blood and Honey (2023) is presented as a film adaptation based on the "Hundred Acre Massacre" that took place before the events of Blood and Honey 2. Although the events of Blood and Honey actually happened in-universe, it is presented as a film within a film, which explains the redesigns for Christopher, Pooh, and Piglet.)

Winnie-the-Pooh: Blood and Honey 2 premiered in London on 18 March 2024, and was theatrically released in the United States on 26 March. It received generally mixed reviews from critics, who nonetheless considered it an improvement over its predecessor, and grossed $7.6 million against a budget of $500,000. A prequel film, Winnie-the-Pooh: Blood and Honey 3 – The Lost Years, is in active development.

== Plot ==
Narrowly having survived Winnie-the-Pooh's and Piglet's killing spree, (Note: As depicted in Winnie-the-Pooh: Blood and Honey (2023).) Christopher Robin flees from the Hundred Acre Wood and returns to his childhood town of Ashdown to seek help; the corpses of Maria and her friends are recovered from the woods, but Christopher is believed to be responsible.

The incident is dubbed the "Hundred Acre Massacre", and a film adaptation based on the murders is released, damaging Christopher's reputation in Ashdown. Only a few people believe Christopher's story, including his childhood friends Lexy, Finn, and Aaron, his parents Alan and Daphne, and his younger sister "Bunny." Now an outcast, Christopher has nightmares about Pooh and goes to his hypnotherapist Mary Darling to deal with a trauma in which his twin brother Billy was kidnapped many years ago during their birthday party, and was never seen again.

Meanwhile, in the Hundred Acre Wood, Pooh and Piglet are forced to hide with fellow creatures Tigger and Owl when their home is burned down. After slaughtering three university students in a recreational vehicle, Owl tries to convince Pooh to attack Ashdown instead of waiting for more people to come to the woods. Some hunters, among them Aaron, ambush the creatures and shoot Piglet in the head as revenge for the deaths of Maria's group. Pooh murders them in retaliation and reconsiders Owl's proposal, but Aaron survives and returns to Ashdown.

Following the town's negative backlash, Christopher gets fired from the hospital and then comes back with Mary to undergo further hypnotherapy. When Aaron arrives at the local hospital for treatment, Christopher suspects the attack was done by Pooh, which is confirmed when he asks Aaron what happened. He also encounters hospital janitor Cavendish, whom he recognises as the man who kidnapped Billy, and confronts him in his house. Cavendish reveals that he worked for Dr. Arthur Gallup, a scientist who employed him to kidnap children—among them Billy—around Ashdown for experiments with animal genes in exchange for settling his debts. The children became animal-human hybrids with enhanced healing factors, whom Gallup killed and buried in the Hundred Acre Wood. Cavendish subsequently killed Gallup and learnt the children resurrected/dug themselves out of their graves. Cavendish burns the last evidence linking him to Gallup and kills himself out of guilt.

As night falls, Pooh, Tigger, and Owl embark on a rampage throughout Ashdown and murder several residents on the way, including Finn. Pooh personally murders Alan and Daphne and attacks Lexy while she is babysitting, but she survives the ordeal. The creatures then arrive at a rave party in an abandoned warehouse and slaughter all the partygoers. Christopher rushes to the warehouse, where he shoots Tigger, and learns Bunny was supposedly kidnapped. He returns to the Hundred Acre Wood and fights Pooh, who easily subdues him as they stumble across Billy's own grave. Christopher calls Pooh—actually known as Billy—by his real name. Lexy intervenes and stalls Pooh long enough for Christopher to murder him with an axe. Video footage of Pooh is passed to the police, who found Bunny in her room unharmed, and Christopher is subsequently cleared of any wrongdoing. Christopher and Bunny are reunited and escorted home by the police.

In a mid-credits scene, Owl and Tigger, having survived, recover the corpses of Pooh and Piglet, with Owl vowing to find a way to bring them back and that they will get their revenge on Christopher, once and for all.

== Cast ==
- Scott Chambers as Christopher Robin
  - Mason Gold as young Christopher Robin
- Tallulah Evans as Lexy
- Ryan Oliva as Winnie-the-Pooh
  - Peter DeSouza-Feighoney as young Winnie-the-Pooh
- Lewis Santer as Tigger
- Marcus Massey as Owl
- Eddy MacKenzie as Piglet
- Simon Callow as Cavendish
- Alec Newman as Alan Robin
- Thea Evans as Bunny Robin
- Nicola Wright as Daphne Robin
- Teresa Banham as Mary Darling
- Flynn Matthews as Finn
- Sam Barrett as Aaron
- Toby Wynn-Davies as Dr. Arthur Gallup

Additionally, Nikolai Leon, Craig David Dowsett, Chris Cordell, Natasha Tosini, Maria Taylor, Danielle Ronald, Amber Doig-Thorne and Natasha Rose Mills appear as Christopher Robin, Winnie-the-Pooh, Piglet, Lara, Maria, Zoe, Alice and Jess respectively, in archival footage from Winnie-the-Pooh: Blood and Honey, with Tosini also appearing as a raver whose head is sawed off by Pooh. Cameo appearances of Bambi, Peter Pan, Pinocchio, a Heffalump and Rabbit are made in drawings during the end credits.

== Production ==
=== Development ===
In a June 2022 interview with Josh Korngut of Dread Central, director Rhys Frake-Waterfield expressed interest in creating a sequel to Winnie-the-Pooh: Blood and Honey, and stated that he wants to "ramp it up even more and go even crazier and go even more extreme". In November 2022, he announced that a sequel, currently titled Winnie-the-Pooh: Blood and Honey 2, was in development, with him returning as director. In September 2023, teaser images were released showing the addition of character Owl, who only appeared in the first movie's prologue. The film features a new cast and new character designs, and takes place in the town of Ashdown rather than the Hundred Acre Wood. Additionally, the character Tigger, who was absent from the first film, appears since going in the public domain in January 2024. In 2023, it was revealed that Frake-Waterfield intended to have Pooh wield a chainsaw as a weapon in the film, and that the film would feature over thirty deaths. With a larger budget, Frake-Waterfield and Scott Chambers aimed to take the sequel into the direction that they were unable to go with the first film.

=== Writing ===
The film's screenplay was written by Matt Leslie. Frake-Waterfield felt it was important to address the criticisms they had received from the first film, especially as it had never even been intended for a theatrical release. He spent time gathering fan feedback, such as putting out polls on Instagram asking what the audience wanted to see in the film. Among the audience's requests was the inclusion of the game Poohsticks, which Pooh and Owl can be seen playing a twisted version of at one point in the film. While a large portion of his audience requested the traditional woodland setting in the Hundred Acre Wood, some requested a small town setting. This led Frake-Waterfield to decide to do a mix of both settings. While there was an opportunity to add in all of the characters, Frake-Waterfield chose to limit the amount to four to ensure quality. Tigger was added to the cast due to fan feedback, while Frake-Waterfield decided to include Owl as he felt he would bring something unique to the group; being an owl, he could fly, and would serve as the "wise one". The film took inspiration from Terrifier 2. The decision was also made to retcon the first film into a film within a film, meaning that while the events of the first film happened in-universe, the film is intended to be an adaptation based on those events. This allowed them to change the designs of the creatures, recast certain characters, and change the story to fit what they thought was best. Frake-Waterfield additionally wanted to feature Christopher Robin as the central protagonist after the character was sidelined to a secondary role in the first film.

After two months of collecting information, Frake-Waterfield and Leslie created a very detailed 20-page script treatment full of ideas and scenes they wanted in the film, such as exploring the origins of Pooh and his friends. One idea they briefly considered was more supernatural, with the soil of the Hundred Acre Woods creating the creatures. The idea was discarded as they felt it was too similar to Pet Sematary, and went down a scientific route involving the creatures being human children who were experimented on by a mad scientist, among them the twin brother of Christopher. This allowed them to create more interesting characters and subplots, such as Cavendish. Despite the similarities, the idea was not taken from Five Nights at Freddy's (which released in October 2023, a month after principal photography on Winnie-the-Pooh: Blood and Honey 2 concluded). Each of the characters in the film -- Winnie-the-Pooh, Piglet, Owl and Tigger -- were inspired by various horror movie villains Frake-Waterfield and Chambers had grown up watching; Pooh was inspired by a mix of Michael Myers and Jason Voorhees for being a silent, hulking brute who prefers to kill as quickly as possible, Piglet was inspired by Leatherface for his large appearance and wearing an apron, Owl was inspired by Pinhead for his habit of monologuing, and Tigger was inspired by a combination of Freddy Krueger, Pennywise and Art the Clown for being a lot more sadistic than the others. By June 2023, the script was completed.

=== Casting ===
By September 2023, Scott Chambers, Ryan Oliva, Talluah Evans, Peter DeSouza Feighoney and Simon Callow were reported to have been cast in the film. Eventually, Marcus Massey and Eddy MacKenzie were added to the cast.

Chambers, Oliva, and MacKenzie took over the roles of Christopher Robin, Winnie-the-Pooh and Piglet from Nikolai Leon, Craig David Dowsett and Chris Cordell, respectively. When recasting Christopher, Frake-Waterfield requested Chambers for the role. Chambers was hesitant as he was producing the film at the same time, as well as the huge amount of negative backlash they had received from the first film (most of which was targeted towards Frake-Waterfield), but accepted his request nonetheless. In portraying Christopher, Chambers aimed to bring hope and vulnerability into the character; "Because he starts in a place where he's uncertain about where his life is going to progress to, who he can and can't trust, and all these kinds of things. I was to keep that flame going. There's hope. He's trying to be positive, but everyone else around him is pulling him down."

In July 2023, Lewis Santer was cast as Tigger. For some time before the film's release, it was mistakenly assumed that Santer played Rabbit. For a month, before filming began, Santer watched two to three horror films a night and made notes to see what frightened him as an actor, then put it into the character. Among these films were A Nightmare on Elm Street, It and Terrifier. An element Santer found amongst the characters of Freddy Krueger, Pennywise and Art the Clown that frightened him was that they would often move slow at first, then spring into frantic movement when someone least expected it. Additional inspiration came from the Disney iteration of the character. Additionally, Santer would often work out at the gym and spend time in his kitchen recording himself practice crawling on his arms and legs very early in the morning. Frake-Waterfield originally planned to have Tigger speak with an English accent, though this was changed to an American accent as they felt the former wasn't frightening enough. An additional element played into the character is that because Tigger has been locked up by the others for so long due to his sadistic nature, by the time he finally escapes, his mental state has deteriorated, rendering him “adrenaline fuel”. For the scene where a group of ravers first encounter Tigger in which the latter is seen twitching, the crew requested Santer to act as if he had drunk "twenty Red Bulls".

Chambers previously worked with Teresa Banham and Callow in acting roles in projects such as Malpractice and Doctor Jekyll, respectively. When casting Banhem as Mary Darling, Christopher Robin's hypnotherapist, he informed her that although her role in the film was small, he promised a larger role in The Twisted Childhood Universe moving on. Chambers believed that Callow would be perfect for the role of Cavendish, a hospital janitor who is revealed to have a dark connection with Pooh and his friends. To his delight, Callow kindly agreed to portray the role.

=== Filming ===
Principal photography began and concluded in September 2023. For the scenes at Christopher Robin's house, Frake-Waterfield originally planned to use the household of A. A. Milne as a homage to the original source material, but negotiations fell through. A World War II bunker was used for several scenes in the abandoned warehouse, such as the tunnel and the boiler room.

Out of all the scenes to film, the rave party was the most difficult to film. Frake-Waterfield and Chambers had grown excited over working on a larger budget, and they believed they could do anything. Three days before principal photography began, the costume designer/production designer left the project, which led Chambers to order the raver costumes online. This in turn was quite difficult, as Chambers barely knew anything about female bodies, and many of the extras for the rave had different breast and waist sizes. This caused him to suffer illness from stress throughout filming. While shooting his hypnotherapy session scenes with Teresa Banhem (his first day of filming), Chambers would often fall asleep in his chair and had to be woken up. In fact, the rave party scene was so stressful to film, Frake-Waterfield threw up on set. Ultimately, this would leave Frake-Waterfield and Chambers to try and scale down the scope of their other films in spite of the budgets to try and make them easier to shoot.

The film was originally reported to have a budget five times larger than its predecessor; it would later be confirmed that the budget had increased to ten times larger than the first film. Executive producers wanted to keep the budget lower in a similar fashion of the first film, though Frake-Waterfield and Chambers managed to convince them to let them work on a larger scale budget. Shaune Harrison, who previously worked on productions such as World War Z, the Harry Potter franchise, and Game of Thrones, was the film's creature and gore designer, while Paula Anne Booker led the special effects. Winnie-the-Pooh's prosthetics in the film cost over $20,000 compared to the $770 spent on the first film's costume. According to Santer, the makeup application process took up to two hours each day. During the process, Santer would spend time listening to heavy metal music in an effort to get into the character mindset for Tigger. While Santer was comfortable while wearing prosthetics, the only downside was that it was difficult for him to hear as his ears were covered. Massey has stated that it was difficult for him to breathe while wearing prosthetics, especially as his nose cavity would often fill up with sweat.

== Music ==
Winnie-the-Pooh: Blood and Honey 2 (Original Motion Picture Soundtrack)

Soundtrack album by Andrew Scott Bell
- Released: 26 March 2024
- Genre: Horror
- Length: 78:05
- Label: Dark House Music

On 14 August 2024, Andrew Scott Bell uploaded a video to YouTube titled "Behind the Score - Winnie-the-Pooh: Blood and Honey 2" that documented him creating the film's score, especially using a flexible plumbing tube he fit a part of a trombone in, which he called the "Tigger Tube", for the scenes involving Tigger, as well as a special type of violin crafted from the parts of a cello, a cigar box guitar, the skull and teeth of a coyote and a cigar box.

Winnie-the-Pooh: Blood and Honey 2 (Original Motion Picture Soundtrack) is the soundtrack album for the film. As with the first film, Andrew Scott Bell composed the film's score. The soundtrack was released by Dark House Music on 26 March 2024.

All music is composed by Andrew Scott Bell.

No.	Title	Length
1.	"Contradiction"	2:52
2.	"A Campervan at Pooh Corner"	3:35
3.	"Difficult to Remember"	0:39
4.	"Ashdown"	0:44
5.	"A Meeting at the Wolery"	3:41
6.	"In Which a Search Is Organdized, and Piglet Meets Some Hunters"	4:00
7.	"In Which Christopher Robin Gets Fired"	1:29
8.	"Christopher and Bunny"	1:04
9.	"In Which the Gang Plays Pooh Sticks"	1:10
10.	"Memories of the Hundred Acre Wood"	3:37
11.	"In Which Tigger Has Breakfast"	1:27
12.	"In Which Christopher Robin Investigates"	2:17
13.	"They Did This"	2:28
14.	"In Which Owl Turns a Blind Eye"	1:44
15.	"Following Cavendish"	1:34
16.	"Now the Weight Is All Yours"	6:35
17.	"In Which Pooh Meets a Toy Car"	3:43
18.	"Listening to the Tapes"	3:09
19.	"Hunny, I'm Home"	1:05
20.	"Peek-a-Pooh"	0:51
21.	"In Which Pooh Meets the Robins"	1:44
22.	"Christopher Says Goodbye"	1:36
23.	"Pooh Meets New Friends in a Tight Place"	1:34
24.	"He Always Seems Bigger Because of His Bounces"	4:41
25.	"In Which Tigger Is Unbounced"	1:03
26.	"In Which Pooh Does a Very Grand Thing"	2:00
27.	"A Little Boy and His Bear Will Always Be Playing"	4:06
28.	"Rissolution"	1:20
29.	"Our Strength Is in Our Friendship / Credits"	3:03
30.	"Ashdown (Bonus Track / Alternate Version)"	0:44
31.	"In Which Pooh Does a Very Grand Thing (Bonus Track / Alternate Version)"	1:59
32.	"A Little Boy and His Bear Will Always Be Playing (Bonus Track / Alternate Version)"	4:08
33.	"Rissolution (Bonus Track / Alternate Version)"	2:25
34.	"Viajemos por el Mundo feat. Cami Rozman from (The Casagrandes Movie: Songs From and Inspired by the Original Motion Picture) / Credits"	2:28
35.	"Obsidian feat. Marlene Ochoa, Ivette Gómez and Genesis Cadetti (from The Casagrandes Movie: Songs From and Inspired the Original Motion Picture)"	3:08
Total length:		90:05

== Release ==
Winnie-the-Pooh: Blood and Honey 2 premiered at the Prince Charles Cinema in Leicester Square, London, on 18 March 2024. Distributed by ITN Distribution, it was theatrically released in the United States and Canada with Fathom Events (now Fathom Entertainment) on 26 March 2024, and was released in the United Kingdom with Altitude Film Distribution on 7 June 2024.

The film was released on Amazon Prime Video on 26 June 2024.

== Reception ==
=== Box office ===
Winnie-the-Pooh: Blood and Honey 2 grossed $533,144 in the United States and Canada, and over $7 million in other territories, for a worldwide total of $7.6 million.

=== Critical response ===
On the review aggregator website Rotten Tomatoes, 47% of 43 critics' reviews are positive, with an average rating of 4.6/10. The website's consensus reads: "Winnie-the-Pooh: Blood and Honey 2 represents an improvement over the original in most respects, although the Poohniverse remains a place made for hardcore slasher fans." Metacritic, which uses a weighted average, assigned the film a score of 27 out of 100, based on nine critics, indicating "generally unfavorable" reviews.

Luke Thompson of The A.V. Club gave the film a positive review, writing "This is cinema at its most punk rock—a raucous, unpolished, cheap, sacred-cow shredding middle finger to the mainstream with just enough raw talent inside to keep it from being dismissable." IGN's Matt Donato gave it a score of 6/10, comparing its approach to that of Terrifier 2 and writing, "It boasts a nastier midnight-movie appeal, radical practical effects, and a brisk 90-minute runtime. It's a shaky first step for Frake-Waterfield's proposed 'Poohniverse' concept – but it's a step in the right direction."

Owen Gleiberman of Variety gave the film a negative review, criticizing the screenplay and direction. He concluded his review by writing, "Somewhere up in drive-in-theater heaven, Herschell Gordon Lewis and Ed Wood are smiling, even if Frake-Waterfield makes them look like Scorsese and Spielberg." The Daily Beast's Nick Schager said the film "boasts a bigger budget, higher production values, and an entirely new cast. Alas, when it comes to the things that matter most—like writing, directing, and acting—it's as chintzy and inept as its predecessor."

== Future ==
=== Prequel ===
On 28 March 2024, two days after the film's release, it was announced that a third film was being developed. By August 2025, it was reported that Chambers would direct the film, from a screenplay by Richard Stanley. Principal photography began in April 2026, with a release date scheduled for December of the same year. Despite being stated as the first entry in the franchise's second phase of films earlier, it was eventually confirmed to be releasing before the crossover film Poohniverse: Monsters Assemble. Pooh and Tigger were eventually confirmed to have new designs in teaser images, with the new character Rabbit also confirmed to appear. It was also confirmed that Piglet and Owl will not reappear in the film due to budgetary reasons. Chambers and Santer will reprise their roles as Christopher Robin and Tigger, respectively, while actor George Montague will replace Ryan Oliva as Pooh. In July 2026, it was revealed that the film would serve as a prequel to the second film, and set sometime after the first movie's prologue; while also explaining that the movie provides additional backstory for various characters while leading directly into the next movie.

In January 2026, George Montage was announced to play the titular character, taking over the role from Ryan Oliva. Stanley was added to the cast, later revealed to be playing the character Balthazar von Woozle, the owner and ringmaster of Woozle's Circus and the film's main antagonist. Stanley revealed Balthazar to not be human at all, but a 100-year-old Woozle instead. After finishing the screenplay, ITN Studios requested Stanley for the role of Balthazar as they were so impressed by his script, as well as to save production costs. Stanley expressed it was his first time playing "the largest role in any movies that have opened." Karol Stanisz was announced to portray the physical embodiment of Rabbit. Stanisz eventually dropped out due to scheduling conflicts, however, and was replaced by Jacob Marshfield. In March 2026, Roger L. Jackson was cast as the voice of Rabbit while Josephine Blazier was cast as MoMo, the film's female lead. Chambers and Lewis Santer will reprise their roles as Christopher Robin and Tigger, respectively. In April 2026, it was announced that YouTuber Cris Parker (aka 3C Films) was set to appear in the film. Parker previously made a voice cameo in Blood and Honey 2. In October 2026, the film's full title was revealed as Winnie-the-Pooh: Blood and Honey 3 – The Lost Years.

=== Spin-off ===
In March 2024, in an interview with Jonathan Fuge of MovieWeb, Lewis Santer spoke of a potential spin-off film centred around Tigger.

In January 2025, franchise producer Scott Chambers announced as part of the studio's second phase of movies, a spin-off of the Winnie-the-Pooh: Blood and Honey movies centered around Tigger, entitled Tigger's Return. The project will enter production following the release of Poohniverse: Monsters Assemble. The producer explained the audience's reception to the character as the reason the character receiving his own instalment.

=== Shared universe and other projects ===
In November 2022, two other horror films were announced: Bambi: The Reckoning and Peter Pan's Neverland Nightmare based on Bambi, a Life in the Woods and Peter and Wendy, respectively. In February 2023, Frake-Waterfield announced that the various projects take place in The Twisted Childhood Universe, sharing continuity as a franchise. The filmmaker further stated that Jagged Edge Productions intends to eventually have crossovers featuring all of the characters. In January 2024, a third film, Pinocchio: Unstrung, based on The Adventures of Pinocchio, was announced as part of the TCU. Pinocchio: Unstrung was referenced at the end of Winnie-the-Pooh: Blood and Honey 2; while other teases to the expanded universe and future projects were displayed through drawings during the end credits.

In March 2024, the series' first crossover film titled Poohniverse: Monsters Assemble was revealed, with Scott Chambers confirmed to be reprising his role as Christopher Robin, as well as Megan Placito returning as Wendy Darling from Peter Pan's Neverland Nightmare and Roxanne McKee as Xana from Bambi: The Reckoning, along with additional horror iterations of fairytale characters such as Rabbit, Sleeping Beauty, the Mad Hatter, Cheshire Cat, Mary Poppins and Tintin.

Frake-Waterfield also expressed interest in making films about Thor, the Norse god of thunder, as well as copyrighted franchises such as Teletubbies, Teenage Mutant Ninja Turtles, and The Powerpuff Girls.
