= Tinker Bell =

Fictional character created by J. M. Barrie

- Peter Pan character
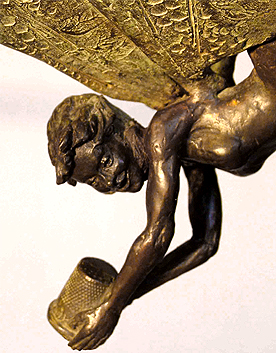
- Tinker Bell (2005, bronze) by Diarmuid Byron O'Connor
- First appearance: Peter Pan (1904)
- Created by: J. M. Barrie

In-universe information
- Species: Fairy
- Gender: Female

Tinker Bell is a fictional character from J. M. Barrie's 1904 play Peter Pan and its 1911 novelisation Peter and Wendy. She has appeared in a variety of film and television adaptations of the Peter Pan stories, in particular the 1953 animated Walt Disney picture Peter Pan. She also appears in the official 2006 sequel Peter Pan in Scarlet by Geraldine McCaughrean commissioned by Great Ormond Street Hospital as well as the Peter and the Starcatchers book series by Ridley Pearson and Dave Barry.

At first only a supporting character described by her creator as "a common fairy", her animated incarnation was a hit and has since become a widely recognized unofficial mascot of The Walt Disney Company, next to the official mascot of Mickey Mouse.

== In original play and novel ==
Barrie described Tinker Bell as a fairy who mended pots and kettles, an actual tinker of the fairy folk. Her speech consists of the sounds of a tinkling bell, which is understandable only to those familiar with the language of the fairies.

Though sometimes ill-tempered, jealous, vindictive and inquisitive, she is also helpful and kind to Peter. The extremes in her personality are explained in the story by the fact that a fairy's size prevents her from holding more than one feeling at a time, so when she is angry she has no counterbalancing compassion. At the end of the novel, when Peter flies back to find an older Wendy, "when she expressed a doubtful hope that Tinker Bell would be glad to see her he said, 'Who is Tinker Bell?' Try as she might, nothing she said helped Peter remember Tinker Bell. Finally, Peter said, 'There are such a lot of them, I expect she is no more.'" The narrator comments that he expected Peter was right, "that fairies don't live long, but they are so little that a short time seems a good while to them."

In the first draft of the play, she is called Tippy-toe, but became Tinker Bell in the later drafts and final version.

== On stage ==
In the original stage productions, Tinker Bell, was represented on stage by a darting light "created by a small mirror held in the hand off-stage and reflecting a little circle of light from a powerful lamp", and her voice was "a collar of bells and two special ones that Barrie brought from Switzerland". However, a "Jane (or Jenny) Wren" was listed among the cast on the programmes as playing Tinker Bell; this was a joke which also helped with the mystique of the fairy character and fooled H.M. Inspector of Taxes, who sent Jane Wren a tax demand.

Originally, no fairy dust was mentioned in the play, but Barrie added to the script the necessity to sprinkle it to enable the children to fly because "so many children tried [to fly] from their beds and needed surgical attention."

In the musical version of the play, she was also represented by a darting light, accompanied by a celesta. Her favourite insult (as in Barrie's play) is "You silly ass!", which the audience learns to recognise because it is always represented by the same motif: four notes (presumably one for each syllable of the phrase), followed by a growl on the bassoon.

== In film ==
Film adaptations provided the first vocal effects for the character, whether through sound, such as musical expressions or the sound of a tinkling bell, or human speech.

=== Peter Pan (1924) ===
In the 1924 film, Tinker Bell was played by Virginia Browne Faire.

=== Hook ===
In the 1991 film Hook, Tinker Bell is portrayed by Julia Roberts. After taking the now-adult Peter to Neverland to rescue his children, Tinker Bell persuades Captain Hook to give her three days to restore Peter's lost memories (including his abilities to fly, fight, and crow) in order to ensure a fair fight between Peter and Hook. After Peter's memory is restored, Tinker Bell "wishes" herself into a human-size woman to share a kiss with Peter. After Peter returns to London, Tinker Bell appears to him one last time on the Peter Pan statue in Kensington Gardens to tell him that she will always love him.

In this version, Tinker Bell is portrayed as a winged, six-inch-tall tomboyish sprite with a red "pixie cut" hairstyle. She wears a ragged leather tunic with matching shorts and carries a dagger strapped to her leg. Only while flying does she appear as the traditional ball of light. Tinker Bell displays strength beyond all proportion to her size and is capable of picking up and carrying a grown man, as well as wielding a human sword while flying (giving the impression that the sword is hovering in mid-air). This is also the first interpretation in which Tinker Bell has the ability to transform into a human-size version of herself. Hook subverts Tinker Bell's canon by having her survive well into the modern era, whereas the original novel states that fairies are naturally short-lived. The implication of the novel was that Tinker Bell died shortly after the Darling children's adventures, and that Peter forgot her.

=== Peter Pan (2003) ===
In the 2003 film Peter Pan, P. J. Hogan originally planned to use a computer-generated version of the character, but instead used Ludivine Sagnier in combination with digital models and effects to take advantage of the actress's expressions.

=== Peter Pan & Wendy (2023) ===
In the 2023 film Peter Pan & Wendy, Yara Shahidi portrayed Tinker Bell. This marked the first time a person of color portrayed the character, who had been previously portrayed by white actors.

=== Peter Pan's Neverland Nightmare (2025) ===
Tinker Bell appears in the 2025 horror film Peter Pan's Neverland Nightmare, which portrays her as a transgender woman addicted to heroin, which she is convinced is fairy dust. She is played by Kit Green.

== Other literary works ==
=== Peter Pan in Scarlet ===
Tinker Bell returns in the official sequel Peter Pan in Scarlet. When Wendy and the rest of the group reach Neverland and ask Peter where she is, he replies that he does not know anyone by the name Tinker Bell, which is explained as him not remembering her after she died. She is mentioned by Wendy and the rest of the Lost Boys to Fireflyer, a silly blue fairy, who when he reaches the top of Neverpeak, makes the wish to meet her. When they open Captain Hook's treasure chest, among other things, Tinker Bell is seen inside it to Fireflyer's joy. Initially, Tinker Bell does not like him, but eventually she comes to see that Fireflyer is not as bad as he seems to be. In the end, they get married and start selling dreams to the Roamers, previous Lost Boys that have been outcast by Peter, while having many adventures.

=== Peter and the Starcatchers ===
In the Dave Barry and Ridley Pearson Peter and the Starcatchers book series, Tinker Bell makes her first appearance at the end of the first novel. Originally, she was a green and yellow coloured bird who was put in a bag of starstuff, turning her into a fairy. Molly's father, the famous starcatcher Lord Leonard Aster, made her Peter's guardian and she follows him on all of his adventures. She doesn't like being called a fairy and would much rather be called "birdwoman" because of her origins. She is very protective of Peter, and hates his paying attention to any other female. She can be very impolite to others (only Peter is able to understand her perfectly, and most of the time he does not reveal what she says about others, because they are mostly insults). She is also able to emit a very bright light, which she uses as an attack against other creatures, especially Lord Ombra, one of the main villains of the series.

=== Cheshire Crossing ===
In the Andy Weir and Sarah Andersen Cheshire Crossing series, Tinker "Tink" Bell firstly appears alongside Peter as they attempt to rescue captured fairies from Captain Hook and the Wicked Witch of the West, with Peter being captured and Tink fleeing to get Wendy's help, alongside that of Dorothy Gale and Alice Liddell, providing the latter two with fairy dust to fly. Later, after Dorothy is captured, Tink frees her and goes to Castle West to warn Jack the Knave of Hearts of the incoming flying pirate ship, preventing the Cheshire Cat from eating her when they attempt to do so. Later, after the Witch defeats Mary Poppins in battle, Tink lends Poppins her power against the Witch as Poppins utters "Say hello to my little friend!", leaving them evenly matched. Later, after the Witch has been defeated, Alice places Peter (now shrunken to Tink's size and having matured due to consuming size-altering berries in Wonderland) next to Tink, having recognized her as being in love with him, and after being complimented by Peter as to her appearance, the pair kiss.

=== Coira in Everland ===
In the book by Kirk Clendinning, Coira in Everland, Tinker "Tink" Bell has isolated herself from the other fairies and girls in Everland, partly due to her anger and humiliation with Pan, deep in the forest within a hollow tree. Coira, who has lost her dream pool, and so too is estranged from the community, finds Tinker Bell and they become fast friends, sharing Pan-like adventures together. When the Mairbh Queen threatens to destroy Everland by enslaving fairies and children to gather nectar so that she can make enough fairy dust to escape from Everland, Tink, Coira, a mauve fairy named Chandler and mysterious boy work together to defeat her and restore Everland to normalcy.

== On television ==
Tinker Bell was voiced or portrayed by:

- Sumi Shimamoto in the 1989 anime series The Adventures of Peter Pan.
- Debi Derryberry in the 1990 Fox animated program Peter Pan and the Pirates.
- Keira Knightley in the 2011 Neverland miniseries.
- Rose McIver in season three (2013) of ABC's Once Upon A Time, debuting in the episode "Quite a Common Fairy".
- In Peter Pan Live!, a TV production of the musical broadcast by NBC in 2014, a computer-generated version of Tinker Bell was used, controlled live by a technician.
- Paloma Faith in the 2015 Peter & Wendy ITV film.

In World of Winx, Tinker Bell is a powerful fairy from the world of dreams (also called Neverland) and a friend of Peter Pan. When Peter Pan eventually left her for Wendy Darling, she became dark and cold, turning into the evil Queen.

== In art ==
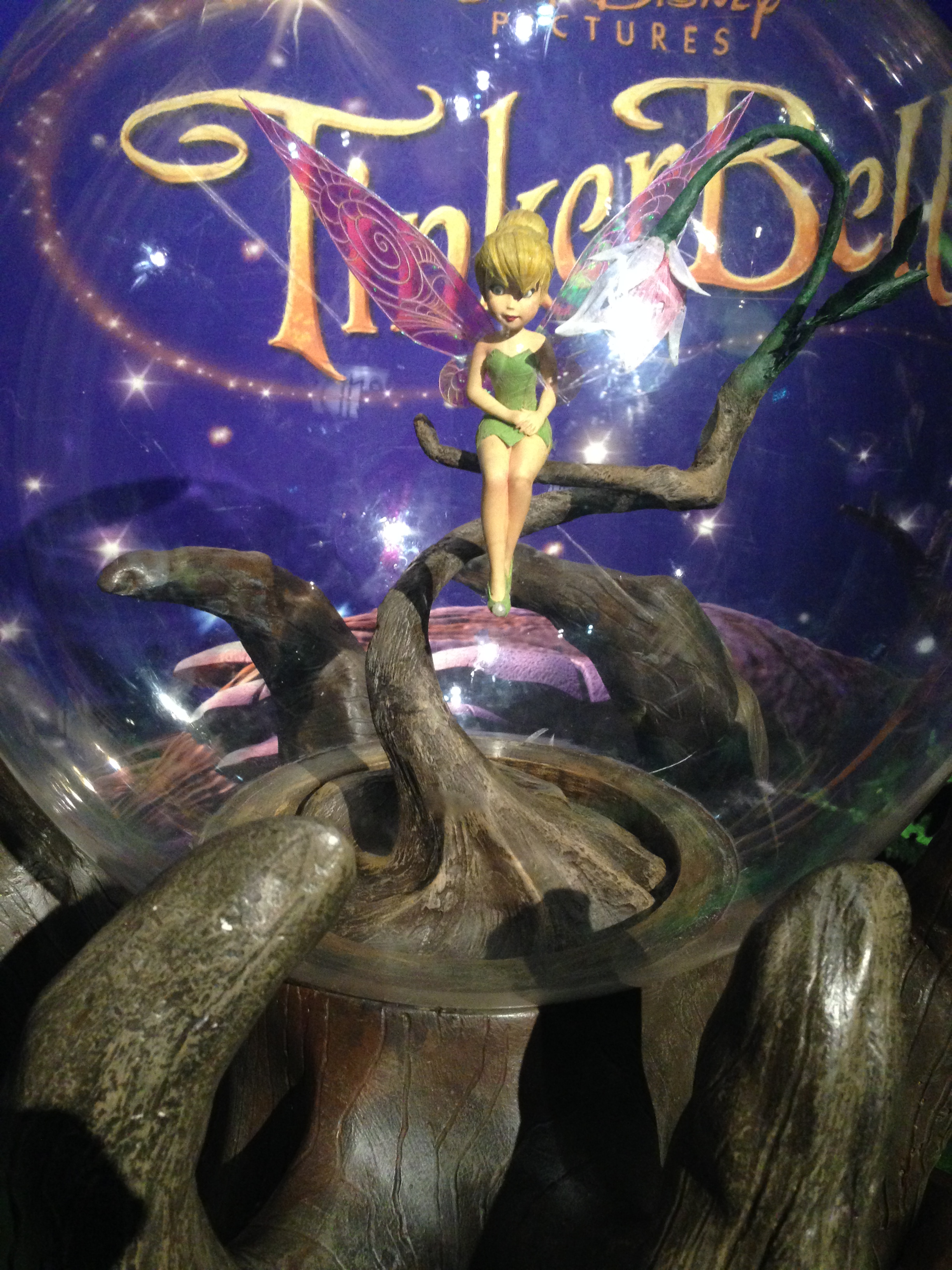
Waxwork of Tinker Bell at Madame Tussauds, London

In addition to the illustrations in the original editions of Peter Pan, Tinker Bell has also been depicted by fantasy artists such as Brian Froud and Myrea Pettit. She also appears in the edition of Peter Pan in Scarlet illustrated by David Wyatt.

A bronze sculpture of Tinker Bell by London artist Diarmuid Byron O'Connor was commissioned by Great Ormond Street Hospital, to whom Barrie bequeathed the copyright to the character, to be added to his original four-foot statue of Peter Pan, wresting a thimble from Peter's finger. The figure has a 9.5 in (240 mm) wingspan and is 7 in (180 mm) tall. She was unveiled on 29 September 2005 by Sophie, Countess of Wessex.

In 2009, a waxwork of Tinker Bell (the museum's "smallest figure of all time" at 5.5 in (140 mm)) was created at Madame Tussauds, London.

== At Disneyland ==
Five people individually played Tinker Bell at Disneyland California from 1961 to 2005. Multiple alternate people, women and men, were playing the role at Walt Disney World in Florida and Disneyland after 2005. Tinker Bell did not start flying in Florida until 1985.

- 1958 (Hollywood Bowl) and 1961–1964 (Disneyland): Tiny Kline
- Summer 1964: Mimi Zerbini
- 1965–1982: Judy Kaye
- 1983–2005: Gina Rock (trained three girls to replace her when she retired)
- 1985–2005: Patty Rock (backup for Gina Rock 1985–1995, then split flying time until 2005)

== In other pop culture ==
Tinker Bell was featured prominently in McDonald's Happy Meal lineup from January 1993 to March 1994.
