= Owl (Winnie-the-Pooh) =

- Winnie-the-Pooh character
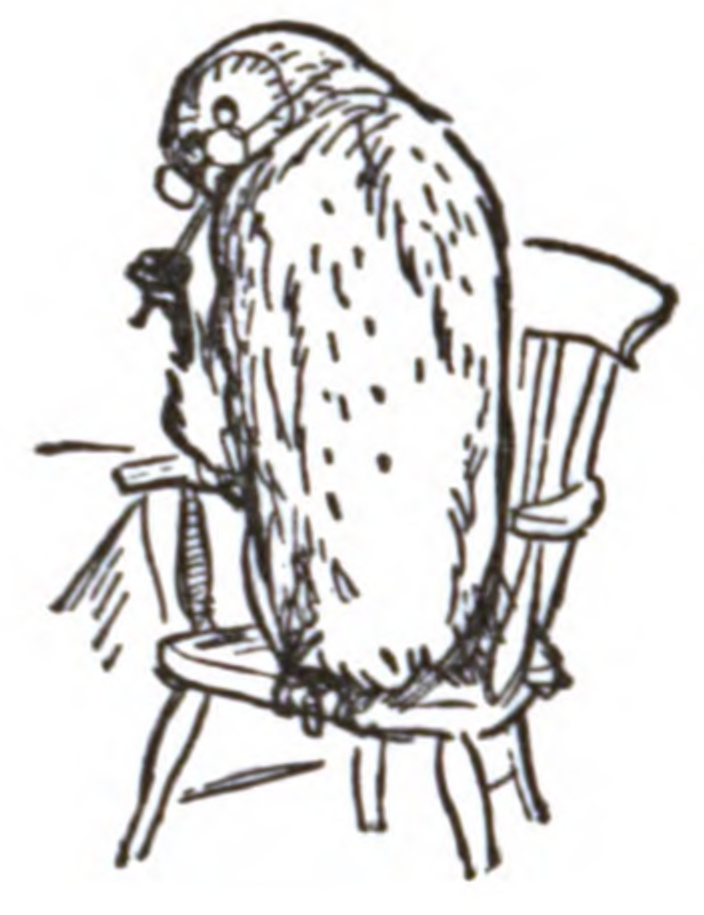
- Illustration by E. H. Shepard
- First appearance: Winnie-the-Pooh (1926)
- Created by: A. A. Milne

In-universe information
- Species: Owl
- Gender: Male
- Nationality: English

Owl is a fictional character in the books Winnie-the-Pooh (1926) and The House at Pooh Corner (1928) by A. A. Milne. He presents himself as a mentor and teacher to the others. He was not based on a stuffed toy, so in the illustrations, he looks more like a live creature. Although he is perceived as wise, sometimes, he has trouble spelling and pronouncing some words and sentences correctly. Still, Winnie the Pooh and others rely on him for his advice and wisdom, especially whenever in trouble or during emergencies.

== Origins ==
=== Inspiration ===
Owl, like Rabbit, was created by Milne's imagination. However, Milne also drew on his own knowledge of spelling and reading to develop Owl's character. Owl's character, like Rabbit's, came from real animals on Cotchford Farm, the Milnes' property in Sussex.

== In the books ==
Owl's first appearance was in the fourth chapter of the 1926 book Winnie-the-Pooh by A. A. Milne. Pooh was searching for Eeyore's missing tail, and visited Owl's place. He had first unwittingly spotted a bell-rope, which looked suspiciously like Eeyore's tail, under which were two notices (which were written by Christopher Robin):"PLES RING IF AN RNSER IS REQIRD", and "PLEZ CNOKE IF AN RNSR IS NOT REQIRD". Pooh knocked on the door and pulled the bell-rope, and called out to Owl, "Owl! I require an answer! It's Bear speaking!" Owl, upon answering the door and hearing of Eeyore's missing tail, suggested putting up posters and offering a reward before asking what Pooh thought about his bell-rope. Owl told Pooh that he just came across it in the forest, and thought someone was living in a bush. He rang it a couple of times until it came off in his talons, and, thinking no one wanted it, took it home with him to use it as his bell-rope. Before Owl could continue, Pooh interrupted him, telling him that the bell-rope was indeed Eeyore's tail. They realised that Owl has taken Eeyore's tail by accident, and Owl gave it back to Pooh, who returned it to Eeyore, and Christopher Robin nailed it back on. In the sixth chapter, Pooh turns to Owl for help after accidentally eating all of the honey out of the honey jar he meant to give Eeyore for his Birthday. He showed Owl the empty honey jar, and asked Owl to write "A Happy Birthday" on it, and Owl, like Piglet did earlier in the chapter, asked Pooh if both he and Pooh give it to Eeyore "From both of us?". Pooh refused, and Owl, after washing the empty honey jar, however, instead wrote, "HIPY PAPY BTHUTHDTH THUTHDA BTHUTHDY" on it, apparently showing his own incompetence at spelling. Pooh brought Eeyore the honey jar, and Eeyore ended up being happy with this present.

In the eighth chapter of The House at Pooh Corner, on a very windy day (Thursday), Piglet and Pooh visit Owl, who tells them a story about his Uncle Robert, whose portrait happened to be hanging on the wall, when all of a sudden, his tree house gets blown over by the wind, trapping the trio inside. Owl asked Pooh, very severely, "Did you do that?", to which Pooh replied, humbly, "I don't think so". In a moment of bravery, Piglet, with a string tied around him by Pooh, while being hoisted up by Owl, finds a way to escape through a tiny crevice, squeezing himself in through the letter box. Piglet goes off to find Christopher Robin, and while Piglet is away, Owl begins telling Pooh the story about his Uncle Robert, during which Pooh dozes off. It is implied that Christopher Robin helps get Pooh and Owl out. In the ninth chapter, due to his house falling over, Owl needs to find a new home and he solicits the help of the other animals in the forest. Rabbit has been leaving messages all over The Hundred Acre Wood, stating,"I AM SCERCHING FOR A NEW HOUSE FOR OWL SO HAD YOU RABBIT". Eeyore had not been informed about Owl's house falling until Rabbit explained it to him, but he goes out to search for a new one. Pooh meets with Piglet and reinforces how brave Piglet was with a poem titled "Here Lies a Tree" before they meet with everyone, minus Eeyore, at Owl's house where furniture is being salvaged, and Kanga got cross with Owl because Roo kept falling in and bringing back more things and Owl's house was a "Disgrace, all damp and dirty, and it was quite time it did tumble down", and that she found that Owl's "sponge" was actually a toadstool. Eeyore then came along and explained that he has found Owl a new house. The house he found is actually Piglet's, but Piglet willingly gives it up. After this, Pooh offers to have Piglet move in with him, which Piglet accepts.

In his final appearance in the tenth and final chapter, Owl, upon his and the others hearing that Christopher Robin was going away, reads a poem (which was written by Eeyore) called "POEM", and after he and the others had signed their names on it, they all went to give it to Christopher Robin, and they all nudged Eeyore to give Christopher Robin the poem, which he read, and as he did, each animal, including Owl, left little by little until just Pooh remained.

== Personality ==
In the books, Owl has a superior but kindly manner towards the others. He can be cross and easily annoyed, especially when his friends ignore or interrupt his long-winded speeches. He sometimes wears reading glasses, and uses his talons for hands, as opposed to his wings in the Disney version. He lives in a tree known as The Chestnuts, described as an "old world residence of great charm". Owl likes to present himself as very knowledgeable, and is perceived by the other animals as such, but like most of the other characters, he does not spell very well. He even spells his own name "Wol" (which is the incorrect way to spell "Owl"), apparently reinforcing his own incompetence at spelling. When Rabbit (who is quite literate) comes to Owl to discuss a notice that Christopher Robin has left, Owl is unable to read the notice. But rather than admit this, Owl anxiously bluffs his way through the conversation until he finally tricks Rabbit into reading the notice out loud, at which point Owl resumes his wise demeanor as if he had known all along what it had said. From the 2011 film and onward, Owl is portrayed as a more pretentious and egotistical character than before. He's sometimes heard boasting about how talented and important he seems, and views himself above the rest of the Hundred Acre Woods denizens.

== Disney adaptations ==
Owl (Disney version)
- First appearance: Winnie the Pooh and the Honey Tree (1966)
- Created by: A.A. Milne
- Voiced by: Hal Smith (1966–1991); Junius Matthews (A Happy Birthday Party with Winnie the Pooh); Andre Stojka (1997–2007); Sam Edwards (record releases); Steve Mackall (Disney Sing Along Songs); Craig Ferguson (2011); Toby Jones (Christopher Robin)

In-universe information
- Species: Owl
- Gender: Male
- Occupation: Mentor
- Family: Owlroy (brother); Clyde (uncle); Torbet (uncle); Horatio (uncle); Clara (aunt); Ophelia (aunt); Clargo (aunt); Dexter (cousin); Unnamed Seagull Cousin; Unnamed cousin (once removed); Countless other relatives

In the Disney adaptations, Owl is much more jovial and friendly. He enjoys telling stories about his relatives whenever a particular situation reminds him of one, but many of his stories are pointless or absurd. Owl has light tan plumage on his underside and brown plumage on his head, tail, and back. His three-taloned feet are also brown. He has a short tuft of white feathers just under his beak, somewhat resembling a beard. The area around his eyes is a slightly lighter shade of brown. His eyes are black with pale yellow sclera, and his eyebrows are dark brown. Owl's beak is yellow. In Welcome to Pooh Corner, Owl always wears glasses (and often a cap and goggles when flying) and loves to cook.

=== Films ===
Owl first appears in the 1966 American animated musical fantasy short film Winnie the Pooh and the Honey Tree. He is seen with Christopher Robin, who is attempting to fix Eeyore's tail, and gives his opinion that the tail needs to be moved to the right. Later, when he notices Pooh stuck in Rabbit's front door, he decides that the situation needs the services of an expert, which turns out to be Gopher. But when Gopher suggests he use dynamite, Owl refuses. When Pooh is finally able to be removed, Owl is one of the characters to help pull him out.

In the 1968 American animated musical fantasy sequel Winnie the Pooh and the Blustery Day, it is revealed that Owl lives in a small house located in a treetop. Pooh and Piglet come to visit him and wish him a Happy Winds Day, but during their visit, Owl's tree is knocked down by the strong winds and his home is damaged, prompting Eeyore to find him a new one. In the meantime, Owl begins telling a long story about a relative, with the narrator noting that he spoke: "from page 41 to page 62." In the midst of the later flood, Owl makes his way to Christopher Robin's home, the only area not underwater. When Christopher Robin finds Piglet's message for help, he sends Owl, who can fly, to tell Piglet that help is on the way. Owl finds Piglet floating on a small chair. To calm Piglet, he begins speaking of another relative, completely oblivious to the fact that the two are about to go over a waterfall. At the end of the short film, Eeyore finds a new house for Owl, which turns out to be Piglet's. However, Piglet selflessly gives Owl his home and goes to live with Pooh.

In Winnie the Pooh and a Day for Eeyore, after Pooh learns that Eeyore's birthday has arrived, he gets Eeyore a honey pot as a present, and visits Owl's house for help in writing out "Happy Birthday" on the pot. Despite only needing those two words, Owl misspells them numerous times and covers up the fact by claiming he wrote out an entire message instead. Owl then travels to tell Christopher Robin of Eeyore's birthday and is present for the latter's birthday party. Owl finally appears with the rest of the characters, playing Pooh Sticks at the bridge, and then decides to go home.

In Pooh's Grand Adventure: The Search for Christopher Robin, Pooh, Piglet, Tigger, Rabbit, and Eeyore go to Owl's house to read them a note from a honeypot that Christopher Robin left Pooh before he mysteriously left and Pooh accidentally got honey all over the note. After removing the honey from the note, Owl misreads the note, saying that Christopher Robin has gone to a place called "Skull" (really school), which is a faraway and forbidden place. When Pooh and the gang decides to go on a quest to rescue Christopher Robin, Owl draws them a map and says that they'll face dangers along the way including Heffalumps, Woozles, Jagulars, and the scariest one of all - the Skullasauraus. Owl then sings the song "Adventure is a Wonderful Thing" and sends Pooh and the gang on their quest and he salutes them. It is later revealed that Owl told Pooh and the gang where to find Christopher Robin. At Skull, they must find him in the eye of the Skull. Towards the end, Owl is seen one last time flying over Christopher Robin saying, "Thank goodness, you got him!"

In The Tigger Movie, when Tigger looks for his family of Tiggers, he and Roo go to Owl for help finding them, to which Owl suggests that Tigger should find his family tree. Tigger follows Owl's advice. Later on, when Roo decides to write Tigger a letter from his family, he gathers Kanga, Pooh, Piglet, and Eeyore at Owl's house and has Owl write the letter. After each individual gives their own message, Owl finishes the letter with, "Wishing you all the best. Signed, Your family." The next day, when Tigger shows the letter to his friends, he tells them that his family of Tiggers is coming to visit him tomorrow. Roo then decides that he, Owl, and the others should dress up as other Tiggers and act as Tigger's family, to which they do. When they arrive at Tigger's house dressed up as his family, everything goes according to plan until Roo accidentally bounces into Tigger's closet, causing his mask to fall off. Tigger pulls off all of the others' masks, including Owl's, which makes him mad, and he leaves to find his real family. After Tigger is found, Owl, Kanga, and Christopher Robin show up and they manage to explain to Tigger that they are his family by reciting what the letter said. In the end, Tigger gives his family a party and gives Owl a yo-yo for a present. Owl then, along with the others, gets a family picture taken with Tigger so Roo can put it in the heart-shaped locket that Tigger gave him as a present.

In Piglet's Big Movie, when Piglet goes missing, Pooh and the gang go to Owl's House to ask Owl if they've seen him to which Owl tells them that he's seen Piglet many times and that he just passed by. As Owl starts to talk about his second cousin Rupert, Pooh and the gang sneak off, to which Owl continues to talk, not even noticing that his friends have left. Owl then appears in the story about everyone finding the North Pole, to which Owl joins Christopher Robin, Pooh, Piglet, Tigger, Kanga, Roo, Eeyore, and Rabbit on an expedition to find it. On the way, Pooh, Piglet, Roo, Kanga, and Tigger get separated from Christopher Robin, to which Christopher Robin remains with Owl, who starts talking about his family again. When Christopher Robin and Owl find Pooh and the gang, Christopher Robin sees that Pooh has a stick in his paws and says that Pooh has found the North Pole which is the stick. Owl and the others all cheer for Pooh, not knowing that it was really Piglet who found the stick and handed it to Pooh. In the end, Owl and the others throw Piglet a hero party in honor of his bravery throughout the many adventures in the Hundred Acre Wood.

In Winnie the Pooh, after a five-year absence, Owl returns in this film with a more prominent role. Owl is first seen writing a memoir of his life beginning at the very tree in which he was born. He is then greeted by Pooh and Eeyore who is currently looking for a solution to the dilemma of Eeyore's missing tail. Owl suggests starting a contest and flies over to Christopher Robin. Christopher sends Pooh out to inform the other residents. At the meeting, Owl suggests a reward is to be distributed if one was to find the tail or a decent replacement. A jar of honey is deemed the prize and the search for replacements begin. After several failed attempts, Owl provides Eeyore with a chalkboard labeled "Tael". Just as Owl accepts the jar of honey, Pooh arrives with a mysterious message from Christopher Robin. Owl interprets the note as a distress call as Christopher has been kidnapped by a creature Owl spotted not too long before, a creature known as the Backson. Rabbit comes up with a plan to capture the beast by luring it into a pit using toys, games, books, and other things Backsons enjoy as bait. Owl joins the friends but they all accidentally end up trapped in the pit themselves. Though Owl has the ability to fly, the group is too absent-minded to realize. With no hope of escaping, Owl decides to recite his memoir to his friends. Pooh spots the jar of honey at the top of the pit, so he creates a ladder using the book's text. Owl and the others then make their escape. When they're freed, Christopher Robin appears and explains that he was only in school for the day. The gang then look at Owl in anger or confusion, the latter being responsible for the whole misunderstanding, and he quickly flies off. Back at his home, Pooh visited him to ask for some honey and notices Eeyore's real tail being used as a bell ringer. Owl didn't notice his bell ringer being Eeyore's tail until Pooh came about and gladly gave the bear the tail. Owl and the others then reward Pooh with a massive honey jar in gratitude for recovering Eeyore's tail.

Owl appears in the 2018 film Christopher Robin, in which he is portrayed as being an Eurasian eagle owl. He is seen to have an argumentative and competitive (though still friendly) relationship with Rabbit over who is the smartest of the Hundred Acre Wood's animals. His role is relatively minor, as he first appears with the rest of the inhabitants of the Hundred Acre Wood to celebrate Christopher Robin's departure for boarding school. Years later, Pooh asks the adult Christopher Robin to help him find Owl and the other animals after they go missing. Owl's house is shown to have been knocked out of a tree (yet again by a strong wind just as in Winnie the Pooh and the Blustery Day), having been scared into hiding alongside Piglet, Kanga, Roo, Tigger, and Rabbit by the noise made by the weathervane atop his roof, which sounded like a Heffalump. He mistakes Christopher Robin for a Heffalump when he first appears, and watches with one of his eyes through a hole in a log he and the other animals are hiding in when Christopher Robin pretends to drive away the nonexistent Heffalump with Eeyore's help. Once Christopher Robin made it look like the Heffalump was gone, Owl is glad to realize that he has returned at long last. He is last seen welcoming Christopher Robin's wife Evelyn and his daughter Madeline to the Hundred Acre Wood, and is cheerfully seen picnicking with the family and the other animals at the end of the film.

=== Television ===
In The New Adventures of Winnie the Pooh, Owl appears regularly as a secondary character. Owl is shown to live in the same treehouse that was seen in The Many Adventures of Winnie the Pooh. Despite not appearing as often as others, he does feature prominently in a few episodes. In "My Hero", Tigger becomes Piglet's servant, due to a policy stated by Owl that when one is rescued, the rescuee must serve the rescuer as a form of repayment. In the episode "Owl Feathers", the gang believes that Owl is going bald after they find a pile of feathers. It is later revealed that the feathers were not Owl's, but were from Christopher Robin's pillow because Pooh and Christopher Robin had a pillow fight the previous night. In the episode "Prize Piglet", Owl reveals that his Uncle Albert once raced from Albania to Zanzibar. Like always, Owl often talks about his relatives, and several appear in the show. He has a younger cousin named Dexter, who appears in the episodes, "Owl in the Family", alongside Owl's Great Uncle Torbett and Aunt Ophelia, and in "The Bug Stops Here", in which he is babysat by Pooh, and befriends an enormous, yet friendly bug after it was kicked out of its group due to his big appetite for food. He was soon presented as a replacement bug for Christopher Robin's science project after his first one ran away by accident. After he was released, he was welcomed back into the clan by his fellow bugs after Rabbit begrudgingly gave up everything from his garden to satisfy his hunger. In "Owl's Well That Ends Well", Owl is revealed to be a terrible singer, though he himself doesn't realize it. However, Rabbit comes to appreciate the singing, as it keeps the Crows out of his garden. He is absent in My Friends Tigger & Pooh completely.

=== Kingdom Hearts series ===
Owl helps Sora while he is in the Hundred Acre Wood with advice on mini-games and how to find more Torn Pages.

In the first Kingdom Hearts game, Owl functions as the narrator and tutorial guide in the 100 Acre Wood, telling Sora when he needs to find more pages, giving him help with mini-games, and overall just providing instruction. Though at times he will talk to other characters such as Pooh or Tigger.

In Kingdom Hearts: Chain of Memories, Owl is part of the challenge to find Pooh's friends. He is seen flying overhead.

In Kingdom Hearts II, Owl plays the same role as he did in the first Kingdom Hearts title providing Sora with instruction. But unlike the first game, he plays more a role in the story of the world.

=== Kinect: Disneyland Adventures ===
Owl makes a brief non-speaking cameo near the end of the gameplay for The Many Adventures of Winnie the Pooh while watching Piglet, Roo, and Eeyore throwing Pooh's presents in a big bag.

=== Disney Dreamlight Valley ===
During Tigger's quest, A Honey of a Problem, Tigger suggests asking Snow White for help removing the bees from his house, and says Snow White is as wise as Owl.

=== Casting history ===
Owil has been voiced by Hal Smith (1966–1991), Junius Matthews (A Happy Birthday Party with Winnie the Pooh), Sam Edwards (Disneyland Records), Andre Stojka (1997–2007), and Craig Ferguson (2011). In Christopher Robin, he was voiced by Toby Jones.

=== Appearances ===
==== Theatrical featurettes ====
- Winnie the Pooh and the Honey Tree (1966)
- Winnie the Pooh and the Blustery Day (1968)
- Winnie the Pooh Discovers the Seasons (1981)
- Winnie the Pooh and a Day for Eeyore (1983)
- Once Upon a Studio (2023)

==== Feature-length films ====
- The Many Adventures of Winnie the Pooh (1977)
- Pooh's Grand Adventure: The Search for Christopher Robin (1997) DVD
- Seasons of Giving (1999) DVD
- Mickey's Once Upon a Christmas (cameo) (1999)
- The Tigger Movie (2000)
- The Book of Pooh: Stories from the Heart (2001) DVD
- Mickey's Magical Christmas: Snowed in at the House of Mouse (2001) DVD
- Mickey's House of Villains (2002) DVD
- Piglet's Big Movie (2003)
- Winnie the Pooh (2011)
- Christopher Robin (2018)

==== Television series ====
- Welcome to Pooh Corner (1983–1986)
- The New Adventures of Winnie the Pooh (1988–1991)
- Recess (1997–2001) (cameo) ("Bachelor Gus")
- House of Mouse (2001–2003, cameo appearances)
- The Book of Pooh (2001–2003)
- At Home With Olaf (2020)

==== Television specials ====
- A Winnie the Pooh Thanksgiving (1998)
- A Valentine for You (1999)

==== Video games ====
- Tigger's Honey Hunt
- Kingdom Hearts
- Piglet's Big Game
- Winnie The Pooh's Rumbly Tumbly Adventure
- Kinect: Disneyland Adventures
- Winnie the Pooh: Adventures in the Hundred Acre Wood
- Disney Magic Kingdoms
- Disney POP TOWN

== Other film adaptations ==
=== Soyuzmultfilm ===
In the 1972 Soyuzmultfilm animated short film Winnie-the-Pooh and a Busy Day, Owl was voiced by Zinaida Naryshkina. Although Naryshkina was an experienced actress, Khitruk knew nothing about her before the auditions. He immediately liked her acting and started recording her right at the auditions.

=== The Twisted Childhood Universe ===
In the horror film Winnie-the-Pooh: Blood and Honey (2023), Owl appears through drawings in the opening scene alongside Rabbit, Eeyore, Piglet, and Winnie-the-Pooh when a young Christopher Robin met and befriended the group of anthropomorphic creatures (later revealed to be crossbreeds) in the Hundred Acre Wood. After Christopher left them for college to become a doctor, added to the arrival of winter and no food to eat, the group cannibalised Eeyore and, traumatised by their actions, developed a hatred for humans, and returned to their feral instincts, whilst also vowing to never speak again. Owl and Rabbit make a cameo later on in the film, observing Christopher's kidnapping by Pooh and Piglet from above.

In the sequel Winnie-the-Pooh: Blood and Honey 2 (2024), Owl appears, portrayed by Marcus Massey. Unlike his original book and Disney counterparts, this version of Owl is an antagonistic murderous serial killer. He is the mastermind behind the attack on Ashdown and is ultimately the film's true main antagonist. Owl has black feathers instead of brown, and features a similar appearance to the Creeper from the Jeepers Creepers film franchise with a nose similar to The Vulture from the Marvel Spider-Man comic books. He is set to return in the crossover film Poohniverse: Monsters Assemble (TBA).

== Reception and analysis ==
In The Tao of Pooh, a 1982 book written by Benjamin Hoff, as shown in "Spelling Tuesday", Owl is described as "a scholarly old owl who lives in the Hundred Acre Wood". Benjamin Hoff also states that "He thinks he’s highly intelligent, and everyone seems to agree with him. But actually, Owl’s abstract knowledge is pointless, and he sabotages himself by over-thinking everything. For instance, Rabbit respects Owl’s spelling abilities, but Owl believes that 'Tuesday' is spelled with a 'Two' and comes before 'Thirdsday.' He uses complicated words like 'customary procedure' (instead of 'the Thing to Do'), which just confuses Pooh and his friends. He spends his free time writing about 'Aardvarks and their Aberrations' and thinking about how to spell words like 'Marmalade'—in fact, he’s so busy thinking about this that he barely notices when his house blows down." Hoff uses Owl to argue that knowledge can actually distract people from the path to wisdom and that scholars who study Taoism are not as trustworthy a source as actual practicing Taoists.

=== Dyslexia representation theory ===
Some interpretations suggest that Owl's frequent reading and writing errors in the stories could represent dyslexia, adding a layer of depth to the character.

In Pathology in the Hundred Acre Wood: a neurodevelopmental perspective on A.A. Milne, Sarah E. Shea, Kevin Gordon, Ann Hawkins, Janet Kawchuk, and Donna Smith agreed about Owl being "obviously bright, but dyslexic", stating that "his poignant attempts to cover up for his phonological deficits are similar to what we see day in and day out in others so afflicted. If only his condition had been identified early and he received more intensive support!"

In a December 2015 study titled Winnie the Pooh Characters and Psychological Disorders by Rachel C. Smith, Rachel C. Smith lists Owl and his symptoms of Dyslexia- "Unable to read, write, or spell, Misspells things, Reads things wrong, Reads 'skull', Dizziness or headaches when reading, Confused by letters, words, Repetition, reversals in letters, Sees movement while reading, Difficulty with..ViSIOn, Not hearing as well, Trouble writing" Sarah E. Shea, one of the authors of Pathology in the Hundred Acre Wood: a neurodevelopmental perspective on A.A. Milne, made a comparison between Owl and students and people with dyslexia, discussing the fact that they think Owl is dyslexic. She points out that

Dyslexia isn't in the DSM-5 as an independent diagnosis (instead it is one symptom of thediagnosis Specific Learning Disorder), so I looked online for the diagnostic characteristics. Diagnostic characteristics are that they appear bright, highly intelligent, and articulate but unable to read, write, or spell at grade level.

Sarah E. Shea made more comparisons, pointing out that like Owl, people with dyslexia are labelled lazy, dumb, careless, immature, "not trying hard enough", or having a "behavior problem", and that they are not behind enough or bad enough to be helped in the school setting. There are also stereotypes about dyslexia revealed: having a high IQ (but they may not test well academically), testing well orally (but not written), feeling dumb, having poor self-esteem, hiding or covering up weaknesses with ingenious compensatory strategies, easily frustrated and emotional about school reading or testing, talented in art, drama, music, sports, mechanics, storytelling, sales, business, designing, or engineering, seeming to zone out or daydream often, getting lost easily or losing track of time, having difficulty sustaining attention, and seeming hyper or a daydreamer. Sarah E. Shea also states that people with dyslexia learn the best through hands-on, experience, demonstrations, experimentation, observation, and visual aids, and that they complain about dizziness, headaches, or stomach aches while reading, they are confused by letters, numbers, words, sequences, or verbal explanations. Sarah E. Shea shows their reading or writing to show repetition, addition, transpositions, omissions, substitutions, and reversals in letters, numbers and/or words. The other problem she points out with dyslexia is complaining of feeling or seeing non-existent movement while reading, writing, or copying, seeming to have difficulty with vision (yet eye exams don't reveal a problem, although they are extremely keen-sighted and observant), or they lack depth perception and peripheral vision. The other problems were that they read and re-read with little comprehension, spell phonetically and inconsistently, have extended hearing, and they hear things not said or apparent to others, and are easily distracted by sounds. The problems also involve have difficulty putting thoughts into words, speaking in halting phrases, leaving sentences incomplete, stuttering under stress, and mispronouncing long words or syllables when speaking. Sarah E. Shea also revealed that they have trouble with writing or copying, and that they are clumsy, uncoordinated, difficulty with fine and/or gross motor skills, and they can be ambidextrous. S. E. Shea also pointed out that Owl could be possibly dyslexic, as he misspells things, and he often reads things wrong. Sarah E. Shea uses two of the stories as examples of Owl's possible dyslexia. One example from one of the stories, he read that the word "school" was "skull" instead. Another example in the story "Eeyore Has a Birthday and Gets Two Presents," Owl writes "HIPY PAPY BTHUTHDTHTHUTHDA BTHUTHDY." Sarah E. Shea also pointed out the obvious irony of the "Wise Old Owl" stereotype found within Owl's character:

"It could be a play on the fact that owls are supposed to be wise. He might be wise, but he also might not be able to read that well".

In Storybook Worlds Made Real Essays on the Places Inspired by Children's Narratives, S. E. Shea and others provided and "armchair diagnoses" of the characters, nothing their disorders and signs which they exhibit: Pooh (ADD), Piglet (Generalized Anxiety Disorder), Owl (Dyslexia), Eeyore (Depression), and Tigger (Hyperactivity).

== Cultural impact ==
Owl represents the archetype of the "wise old owl," contributing to the cultural impact by embodying a character who appears knowledgeable but often makes silly mistakes, highlighting the humorous irony of someone overly confident in their intelligence while sometimes lacking true understanding; this portrayal is often used to playfully critique pompous individuals who overestimate their wisdom In Wise Owl The Ancient Symbol of Wisdom by Ross Berger, Owl is described as "a very important character", though named "Wol" (the Sussex dialect for "Owl"), offering advice, opinions, and stories to Winnie the Pooh and Christopher Robin and his friends, therefore, "characterized as the stereotypical wise old owl". However, it is also pointed out "Nevertheless, his intelligence isn't consistent-he is a terrible speller!"
