= Teresa Banham =

British actress (born 1964)

- Born: 1964 (age 61–62); Surrey, England
- Occupation: Actress
- Years active: 1986–present

Teresa Banham, also known and credited as Theresa Banham (born 1964), is a British actress perhaps best known for playing the role of the Broadfell Prison Governor in the first part of the Doctor Who Christmas special "The End of Time" and the role of Rebecca on the television show Robin Hood. In 2012, she appeared as Sor Sebastiana in the original Royal Shakespeare Company production of Helen Edmundson's The Heresy of Love.

Banham was born in Surrey.

== Filmography ==
=== Film ===
Key
†	Denotes films that have not yet been released

Film
Year	Film	Role	Notes
1987	Cariani and the Courtesans	Teresa	
1990	Frankenstein's Baby	Voluntary Worker	
1994	The Healer	Ann Meadrow	
1995	Spectromania-Massage	Wendy Byatt	
1995	Massage	Wendy Byatt	
1998	Touch and Go	Laura Aldridge	
2001	Gentlemen's Relish	Jane Davidson	
2002	The Project	Sian	
2024	Winnie-the-Pooh: Blood and Honey 2	Dr. Mary Darling	
2025	Peter Pan's Neverland Nightmare	Dr. Mary Darling	

=== Television ===
Key
†	Denotes films that have not yet been released

Television
Year	Title	Role	Notes
1986	The Return of Sherlock Holmes	Janet Tregallis	Episode: "The Musgrave Ritual"
1989	After the War	Jackie Neville	Episode: "French and English"
1990	The Bill	Paula Reed	Episode: "Jack-the-Lad"
1995	Coogan's Run	Debs	Episodes: "Thursday Night Fever" and "Natural Born Quizzers"; credited as "Theresa Banham"
1995	Roughnecks	Tessa Buckingham	13 episodes - lead role
1995	Ghosts	Wendy Byatt	Episode: "Massage"
2000	Monsignor Renard	Clara Baquet	4 episodes
2003	Red Cap	Linda Cosgrove	Episode: "Esprit de Corps"
2003	Trust	Teresa Bradley	3 episodes
2004	Rose and Maloney	Davina	Episodes: "Katie Phelan: Part 1 & 2"
2006	Vincent	Barbara Knight	Episode: "The Bodies Beneath"
2007	Trial & Retribution	Sheila Field	Episode: "Closure: Part 1"
2007	Dalziel and Pascoe	Dr. June Gray	Episodes: "Project Aphrodite: Part 1 & 2"
2009	Robin Hood	Rebecca	Episodes: "Cause and Effect", "Lost in Translation", "Sins of the Father" and "Something Worth Fighting For: Part 1"
2009	Doctor Who	The Governor	Episode: "The End of Time (Part 1)"
2012	Casualty	Hannah MacCrimmon	Episode: "Out of the Blue"
2014	Vera	Lorna Underwood	Episode: "Protected"
2019	The Crown	Mary Wilson	Episode: "Olding"
