= Charity Kase (drag queen) =

British drag performer

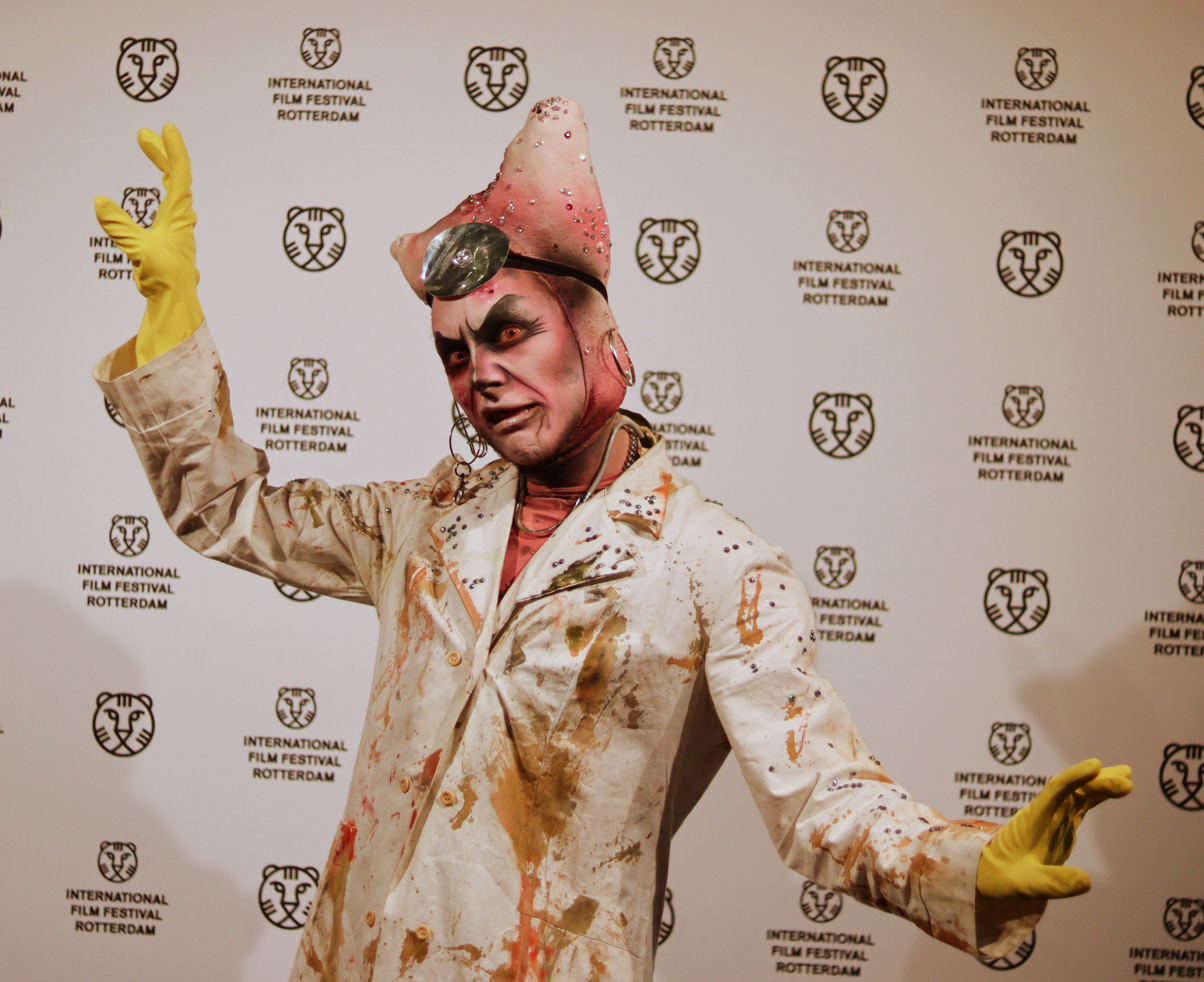
- Charity Kase in 2023
- Born: Harry Whitfield; 16 November 1996 (age 29); Rufford, Lancashire, United Kingdom
- Occupations: Drag queen, actor
- Years active: 2016-present
- Television: RuPaul's Drag Race UK (series 3)
- Website: charitykase.com

Charity Kase is the stage name of Harry Whitfield (born 16 November 1996), an English actor, drag performer, and artist most known for competing on the third series of RuPaul's Drag Race UK.

== Early life ==
Whitfield was raised in Rufford, Lancashire. He enjoyed design and makeup as a child. During his teens, he explored his creativity by wearing costumes in Liverpool and Manchester.

== Career ==
Charity Kase is Whitfield's drag persona. Charity Kase worked at the London club The Box Soho, as of 2018. She competed on the third series of RuPaul's Drag Race UK. In 2021, BBC's Harvey Day said she was "firmly established as one of east London's edgiest drag queens - with a following of hundreds of thousands on Instagram." According to Day, Charity Kase is "well-known for her extravagant, outrageous, over-the-top looks".

Charity Kase partnered with Wildcat Gin in 2021 to promote a new flavor of gin. In 2023, she and Anubis Finch announced an 11-date tour, called The Nightmares Before Christmas Tour. In 2024, Charity Kase appeared in the Circus of Horrors UK Tour titled the 'Cabaret of Curiosities', where she performed as the MC sharing the role with fellow drag queen Baby Lame. Both Baby and Charity performed together when the Tour arrived in Clapham at the Clapham Grand.

== Personal life ==
Whitfield is based in London.

Charity Kase is a "drag daughter" of Raja, who won the third season of RuPaul's Drag Race in the U.S. Charity Kase became the third contestant in Drag Race history, and the first from Drag Race UK, to reveal she was living with HIV, following Ongina and Trinity K. Bonet. Series 6 contestant Kyran Thrax is Charity Kase's "drag daughter".

== Discography ==
=== Singles ===
==== As featured artist ====
- Who Told You to Hate Yourself (Die Arkitekt feat. Charity Kase) (2022)

== Filmography ==
=== Television ===
- RuPaul's Drag Race UK (series 3)

=== Film ===
- Peter Pan's Neverland Nightmare (2025) as Captain James Hook

=== Web series ===
Year	Title	Role	Ref
2021	Cosmo Queens UK	Himself	
