= Kit Green =

English writer and performer

Kit Green (née Christopher Green; born c. 1968 in Matlock, Derbyshire) is an English writer and performer whose work includes comedy, cabaret, theatre and live art.

== Background ==
Green was born in Sheffield and grew up in Darley Dale and lives and works in London, England. Her characters include country music singer Tina C and pensioner rapper Ida Barr. Green got into comedy via television production and acting, after graduating from Goldsmiths College (University of London), with a degree in Drama and English. She is perhaps best known for her work as a character comedian, in a range of personas, and has toured worldwide to venues such as The Albert Hall and Sydney Opera House. She is trans.

== Main characters played ==
Tina C. is a faux country music singer whose performances cover a range of topics including sexual politics ("No Dick's As Hard As My Life"), geo-politics ("Tina C's Twin Tower Tribute"), and her bid to run in the 2008 presidential race in her show called "Manifesto". In a 2007 commission from the Adelaide Cabaret Festival for "Sorry Seems To Be The Hardest Word" Tina solves the Aboriginal tensions Down Under. A new series of the Tina C. BBC Radio 4 series was broadcast in late 2011, entitled Tina C, from Middle America to the Middle East. On 3 December 2015, BBC Radio 4 broadcast the first episode of a four-part series, Tina C: Herstory, which purported to trace the fictional character's life-story in words and music, with Dr Raj Persaud playing himself as the episode's guest interviewer.

Another character played by Green is Ida Barr, a self-proclaimed "world's first Music hall singer turned RnB rap superstar" who has performed her two solo shows, "Artificial Hip hop" and "Get Old or Die Tryin'" all over the world, on various UK tours, and on a variety of media. Artificial Hip Hop, the BBC Radio 4 series, was broadcast in late 2010.

In 2025, Green played the role of Tinker Bell in the horror feature film Peter Pan's Neverland Nightmare produced by Jagged Edge Productions and directed by Scott Jeffery.

== Installation events ==
She was the British Library Artist in Residence 2012; in this appointment she investigated the history of hypnosis in the Library's collections.

== Awards ==
Green won the Olivier Award for Best Entertainment 2004 for "Duckie's C'est Barbican!", a show which she devised and co-wrote with Mark Whitelaw, Ursula Martinez, Marisa Carnesky, Francesca Baglione and Simon Vincenzi, and with a score by Ian Hill, which was performed at the Barbican Pit.

In 2025 Green was nominated for Best Supporting Actress at the 2025 Nation Film Awards for her appearance in Peter Pan's Neverland Nightmare.
