= List of British films of 2025 =

This article lists British feature-length films and full-length documentaries that have their premiere in 2025 and were at least partly produced by the United Kingdom. It does not feature short films, medium-length films, made-for-TV films, pornographic films, filmed theater, VR films or interactive films, nor does it include films screened in film festivals in previous years that have theatrical premieres in 2025.

== Film premieres ==
=== January–March ===
Opening		Title	Cast and crew	Details	Ref.
J A N U A R Y	13	Peter Pan's Neverland Nightmare	Director: Scott Chambers; Cast: Martin Portlock, Megan Placito, Kit Green, Peter DeSouza-Feighoney, Charity Kase, Teresa Banham	Altitude Film Distribution; Based on Peter Pan by J. M. Barrie	
J A N U A R Y	24	Brides	Director: Nadia Fall; Cast: Ebada Hassan, Safiyya Ingar, Yusra Warsama, Cemre Ebuzziya, Aziz Capkurt	Bankside Films	
J A N U A R Y	24	Rabbit Trap	Director: Bryn Chainey; Cast: Dev Patel, Rosy McEwen, Jade Croot		
J A N U A R Y	25	The Ballad of Wallis Island	Director: James Griffiths; Cast: Carey Mulligan, Tom Basden, Tim Key	Universal Pictures International	
J A N U A R Y	25	The Thing with Feathers	Director: Dylan Southern; Cast: Benedict Cumberbatch, Richard Boxall, Henry Boxall, Eric Lampaert	Based on Grief Is the Thing with Feathers by Max Porter	
J A N U A R Y	26	Cactus Pears	Director: Rohan Parashuram Kanawade; Cast: Bhushaan Manoj, Suraaj Suman		
J A N U A R Y	27	Khartoum	Director: Anas Saeed, Rawia Alhag, Ibrahim Snoopy Ahmad, Timeea Mohamed Ahmed, Philip Cox		
F E B R U A R Y	7	Becoming Led Zeppelin	Director: Bernard MacMahon; Cast: Jimmy Page, John Paul Jones, John Bonham, Robert Plant	Sony Pictures Classics; About the early years of Led Zeppelin	
F E B R U A R Y	13	Bridget Jones: Mad About the Boy	Director: Michael Morris; Cast: Renée Zellweger, Emma Thompson, Chiwetel Ejiofor, Leo Woodall, Jim Broadbent, Hugh Grant, Colin Firth	Universal Pictures; Sequel to Bridget Jones’s Baby	
F E B R U A R Y	13	My Fault: London	Director: Dani Girdwood, Charlotte Fassler; Cast: Asha Banks, Matthew Broome, Eve Macklin, Ray Fearon, Sam Buchanan	Amazon MGM Studios; Based on Culpa mía by Mercedes Ron	
F E B R U A R Y	14	Hot Milk	Director: Rebecca Lenkiewicz; Cast: Emma Mackey, Fiona Shaw, Vicky Krieps, Vincent Perez, Patsy Ferran	Mubi; Based on Hot Milk by Deborah Levy	
F E B R U A R Y	21	Cleaner	Director: Martin Campbell; Cast: Daisy Ridley, Taz Skylar, Clive Owen	Quiver Distribution	
F E B R U A R Y	26	Tornado	Director: John Maclean; Cast: Kōki, Jack Lowden, Takehiro Hira, Tim Roth	Lionsgate UK	
F E B R U A R Y	28	Fight or Flight	Director: James Madigan; Cast: Josh Hartnett, Charithra Chandran, Julian Kostov, Katee Sackhoff, Marko Zaror	Sky Cinema	
F E B R U A R Y	28	Last Breath	Director: Alex Parkinson; Cast: Woody Harrelson, Simu Liu, Finn Cole, Djimon Hounsou	Entertainment Film Distributors; Based on Last Breath by Alex Parkinson and Richard da Costa	
M A R C H	6	Picture This	Director: Prarthana Mohan; Cast: Simone Ashley, Hero Fiennes Tiffin, Luke Fetherston, Sindhu Vee	Prime Video; Based on Five Blind Dates by Shawn Seet	
M A R C H	7	Hallow Road	Director: Babak Anvari; Cast: Rosamund Pike, Matthew Rhys, Paul Tylak	XYZ Films	
M A R C H	8	LifeHack	Director: Ronan Corrigan; Cast: Georgie Farmer, Yasmin Finney, Roman Hayeck-Green	Vue	
M A R C H	10	The Rivals of Amziah King	Director: Andrew Patterson; Cast: Matthew McConaughey, Kurt Russell, Cole Sprouse, Owen Teague, Scott Shepherd, Rob Morgan, Tony Revolori	Black Bear Pictures	

=== April–June ===
Opening		Title	Cast and crew	Details	Ref.
A P R I L	4	Mr Burton	Director: Marc Evans; Cast: Harry Lawtey, Toby Jones, Lesley Manville, Aimee-Ffion Edwards, Aneurin Barnard	Icon Film Distribution; Based on the early life of Richard Burton	
A P R I L	25	Havoc	Director: Gareth Evans; Cast: Tom Hardy, Forest Whitaker, Timothy Olyphant, Justin Cornwell, Luis Guzmán	Netflix	
M A Y	2	Words of War	Director: James Strong; Cast: Maxine Peake, Jason Isaacs, Ciarán Hinds, Ellie Bamber, Harry Lawtey, Naomi Battrick	Signature Entertainment; Based on the life of Anna Politkovskaya	
M A Y	15	Left-Handed Girl	Director: Shih-Ching Tsou; Cast: Janel Tsai, Shih-Yuan Ma, Nina Ye, Brando Huang, Akio Chen	Netflix	
M A Y	16	The Chronology of Water	Director: Kristen Stewart; Cast: Imogen Poots, Thora Birch, Earl Cave, Kim Gordon, Jim Belushi	BFI Distribution; Based on The Chronology of Water by Lidia Yuknavitch	
M A Y	17	Urchin	Director: Harris Dickinson; Cast: Frank Dillane, Megan Northam, Amr Waked	Picturehouse Entertainment	
M A Y	18	My Father's Shadow	Director: Akinola Davies Jr. Cast: Ṣọpẹ́ Dìrísù, Godwin Chiemerie Egbo, Chibuike Marvellous Egbo	Mubi	
M A Y	20	The Disappearance of Josef Mengele	Director: Kirill Serebrennikov; Cast: August Diehl, Max Bretschneider, David Ruland, Dana Herfurth, Burghart Klaussner	Based on The Disappearance of Josef Mengele by Olivier Guez	
M A Y	21	The History of Sound	Director: Oliver Hermanus; Cast: Paul Mescal, Josh O'Connor	Universal Pictures; Based on The History of Sound by Ben Shattuck	
M A Y	21	A Pale View of Hills	Director: Kei Ishikawa; Cast: Suzu Hirose, Fumi Nikaido, Yō Yoshida, Camilla Aiko	Based on A Pale View of Hills by Kazuo Ishiguro	
M A Y	21	Sentimental Value	Director: Joachim Trier; Cast: Renate Reinsve, Stellan Skarsgård, Elle Fanning, Cory Michael Smith	Mubi	
M A Y	23	The Mastermind	Director: Kelly Reichardt; Cast: Josh O'Connor, Alana Haim	Mubi	
J U N E	10	Stitch Head	Director: Steve Hudson; Cast: Asa Butterfield, Joel Fry, Rob Brydon, Tia Bannon	Kazoo Films; Based on Stitch Head by Guy Bass	
J U N E	12	Deep Cover	Director: Tom Kingsley; Cast: Bryce Dallas Howard, Orlando Bloom, Nick Mohammed, Paddy Considine, Ian McShane, Sean Bean	Amazon MGM Studios	
J U N E	17	Chicken Town	Director: Richard Bracewell; Cast: Laurence Rickard, Graham Fellows, Alistair Green	Verve Pictures	
J U N E	20	28 Years Later	Director: Danny Boyle; Cast: Alfie Williams, Aaron Taylor-Johnson, Jodie Comer, Ralph Fiennes, Edvin Ryding, Chi Lewis-Parry, Jack O'Connell	Sony Pictures Releasing; Sequel to 28 Weeks Later	

=== July–September ===
Opening		Title	Cast and crew	Details	Ref.
J U L Y	25	Bambi: The Reckoning	Director: Dan Allen; Cast: Roxanne McKee, Tom Mulheron, Nicola Wright, Samira Mighty	ITN Studio; Based on Bambi, a Life in the Woods by Felix Salten	
A U G U S T	1	My Oxford Year	Director: Iain Morris; Cast: Sofia Carson, Corey Mylchreest, Dougray Scott, Catherine McCormack, Harry Trevaldwyn, Hugh Coles, Poppy Gilbert	Based on My Oxford Year by Julia Whelan; Netflix	
A U G U S T	14	Bulk	Director: Ben Wheatley; Cast: Sam Riley, Alexandra Maria Lara, Noah Taylor, Mark Monero	Anti-Worlds Releasing	
A U G U S T	16	Grow	Director: John McPhail; Cast: Golda Rosheuvel, Priya-Rose Brookwell, Nick Frost, Joe Wilkinson, Tim McInnerny	Sky Cinema	
A U G U S T	28	Bugonia	Director: Yorgos Lanthimos; Cast: Emma Stone, Jesse Plemons, Aidan Delbis, Stavros Halkias, Alicia Silverstone	Focus Features; Based on Save the Green Planet! by Jang Joon-hwan	
A U G U S T	28	Hijra	Director: Shahad Ameen; Cast: Lamar Faden, Khairiah Nathmy, Nawaf Al-Dhufairy		
A U G U S T	28	Orphan	Director: László Nemes; Cast: Bojtorján Barabas, Grégory Gadebois, Andrea Waskovics	Mubi	
A U G U S T	29	H Is for Hawk	Director: Philippa Lowthorpe; Cast: Claire Foy, Brendan Gleeson, Denise Gough, Sam Spruell, Lindsay Duncan	Lionsgate; Based on H is for Hawk by Helen MacDonald	
A U G U S T	29	The Roses	Director: Jay Roach; Cast: Benedict Cumberbatch, Olivia Colman, Kate McKinnon, Andy Samberg	Searchlight Pictures; Inspired by The War of the Roses by Warren Adler	
A U G U S T	30	Broken English	Directors: Iain Forsyth and Jane Pollard	Vue International	
A U G U S T	30	Ish	Director: Imran Perretta; Cast: Farhan Hasnat, Yahya Kitana, Sudha Bhuchar, Avin Shah, Joy Crookes		
A U G U S T	30	Rose of Nevada	Director: Mark Jenkin; Cast: George MacKay, Callum Turner	BFI Distribution	
S E P T E M B E R	1	Straight Circle	Director: Oscar Hudson; Cast: Luke Tittensor, Elliot Tittensor, Neil Maskell		
S E P T E M B E R	1	The Testament of Ann Lee	Director: Mona Fastvold; Cast: Amanda Seyfried, Thomasin McKenzie, Lewis Pullman, Stacy Martin, Tim Blake Nelson, Christopher Abbott, Matthew Beard	Based on the life of Ann Lee; Searchlight Pictures	
S E P T E M B E R	3	In the Hand of Dante	Director: Julian Schnabel; Cast: Oscar Isaac, Gerard Butler, John Malkovich	Based on In the Hand of Dante by Nick Tosches	
S E P T E M B E R	4	Saipan	Director: Glenn Leyburn, Lisa Barros D’Sa; Cast: Steve Coogan, Éanna Hardwicke	Based on the Saipan incident	
S E P T E M B E R	5	The Choral	Director: Nicholas Hytner; Cast: Ralph Fiennes, Jim Broadbent, Simon Russell Beale	Sony Pictures Classics	
S E P T E M B E R	5	Christy	Director: Brendan Canty Cast: Danny Power, Diarmuid Noyes, Emma Willis, Alison Oliver, Chris Walley, Helen Behan	Altitude	
S E P T E M B E R	5	Fuze	Director: David Mackenzie; Cast: Aaron Taylor-Johnson, Theo James, Sam Worthington, Gugu Mbatha-Raw	Sky Cinema	
S E P T E M B E R	5	Good Boy	Director: Jan Komasa; Cast: Stephen Graham, Andrea Riseborough, Anson Boon	Signature Entertainment	
S E P T E M B E R	5	Hamlet	Director: Aneil Karia; Cast: Riz Ahmed, Morfydd Clark, Joe Alwyn	Focus Features; Based on Hamlet by William Shakespeare	
S E P T E M B E R	5	The Man in My Basement	Director: Nadia Latif; Cast: Corey Hawkins, Willem Dafoe, Anna Diop, Tamara Lawrance	Hulu; Based on The Man In My Basement by Walter Mosley	
S E P T E M B E R	5	Palestine 36	Director: Annemarie Jacir; Cast: Hiam Abbass, Kamel El Basha, Yasmine Al Massri, Jalal Altawil, Robert Aramayo, Saleh Bakri	Curzon Film	
S E P T E M B E R	5	Steve	Director: Tim Mielants; Cast: Cillian Murphy, Jay Lycurgo	Netflix; Based on Shy by Max Porter	
S E P T E M B E R	6	100 Nights of Hero	Director: Julia Jackman; Cast: Emma Corrin, Nicholas Galitzine, Maika Monroe, Amir El-Masry, Charli XCX, Richard E. Grant, Felicity Jones	Based on The One Hundred Nights of Hero by Isabel Greenberg	
S E P T E M B E R	6	California Schemin'	Director: James McAvoy; Cast: Samuel Bottomley, Séamus McLean Ross	StudioCanal; Based on Straight Outta Scotland by Gavin Bain	
S E P T E M B E R	6	Sacrifice	Director: Romain Gavras; Cast: Anya Taylor-Joy, Chris Evans, Salma Hayek, Vincent Cassel, Ambika Mod, Sam Richardson, John Malkovich, Charli XCX		
S E P T E M B E R	6	Wasteman	Director: Cal McMau; Cast: Tom Blyth, David Jonsson	Lionsgate UK	
S E P T E M B E R	6	Winter of the Crow	Director: Kasia Adamik; Cast: Lesley Manville, Tom Burke, Zofia Wichłacz	Based on Professor Andrews Goes to Warsaw by Olga Tokarczuk	
S E P T E M B E R	7	& Sons	Director: Pablo Trapero; Cast: Bill Nighy, George MacKay, Noah Jupe, Imelda Staunton, Johnny Flynn, Dominic West	Based on & Sons by David Gilbert	
S E P T E M B E R	7	The Christophers	Director: Pablo Trapero; Cast: Ian McKellen, Michaela Coel, James Corden, Jessica Gunning	Picturehouse Entertainment	
S E P T E M B E R	7	Hamnet	Director: Chloé Zhao; Cast: Jessie Buckley, Paul Mescal, Joe Alwyn, Emily Watson	Universal Pictures; Based on Hamnet by Maggie O'Farrell	
S E P T E M B E R	7	The Son and the Sea	Director: Stroma Cairns; Cast: Jonah West, Stanley Brock, Connor Tompkins, Lewis Tompkins		
S E P T E M B E R	8	Eternal Return	Director: Yaniv Raz; Cast: Naomi Scott, Kit Harington, Simon Callow, Sonoya Mizuno, Jay Lycurgo		
S E P T E M B E R	8	Retreat	Director: Ted Evans; Cast: Anne Zander, James Boyle, Sophie Leigh Stone, Ace Mahbaz		
S E P T E M B E R	9	Ballad of a Small Player	Director: Edward Berger; Cast: Colin Farrell, Fala Chen, Deanie Ip, Alex Jennings, Tilda Swinton	Based on The Ballad of a Small Player by Lawrence Osborne	
S E P T E M B E R	9	Mare's Nest	Director: Ben Rivers; Cast: The Word for Snow by Don DeLillo	Based on The Word for Snow by Don DeLillo	
S E P T E M B E R	11	Glenrothan	Director: Brian Cox; Cast: Alan Cumming, Brian Cox, Shirley Henderson, Alexandra Shipp	Lionsgate UK	
S E P T E M B E R	12	Downton Abbey: The Grand Finale	Director: Simon Curtis; Cast: Hugh Bonneville, Laura Carmichael, Phyllis Logan, Robert James-Collier, Jim Carter, Michelle Dockery, Elizabeth McGovern, Imelda Staunton, Penelope Wilton, Paul Giamatti	Focus Features; Sequel to Downton Abbey: A New Era	
S E P T E M B E R	26	Mother's Pride	Director: Nick Moorcroft; Cast: Jonno Davies, Martin Clunes, James Buckley	Entertainment Film Distributors	
S E P T E M B E R	28	Anemone	Director: Ronan Day-Lewis; Cast: Daniel Day-Lewis, Sean Bean, Samantha Morton	Universal Pictures	
S E P T E M B E R	30	Man on the Run	Director: Morgan Neville; Cast: Paul McCartney	MetFilm Distribution	

=== October–December ===
Opening		Title	Cast and crew	Details	Ref.
O C T O B E R	10	Moss & Freud	Director: James Lucas; Cast: Ellie Bamber, Derek Jacobi, Will Tudor, Jasmine Blackborow, Tim Downie	Vertigo Releasing; Based on the lives of Kate Moss and Lucian Freud	
O C T O B E R	10	The Woman in Cabin 10	Director: Simon Stone; Cast: Keira Knightley, Guy Pearce, Hannah Waddingham, Kaya Scodelario, Gugu Mbatha-Raw	Netflix; Based on The Woman in Cabin 10 by Ruth Ware	
O C T O B E R	16	Lady	Director: Samuel Abrahams; Cast: Sian Clifford, Juliet Cowan, Laurie Kynaston, Olisa Odele		
O C T O B E R	17	The Twits	Director: Phil Johnston; Cast: Margo Martindale, Johnny Vegas, Euan Morton, Maitreyi Ramakrishnan, Ryan Lopez, Emilia Clarke	Based on The Twits by Roald Dahl; Netflix	
N O V E M B E R	7	The Running Man	Director: Edgar Wright; Cast: Glen Powell, Katy O'Brian, Daniel Ezra, Karl Glusman, Josh Brolin, Lee Pace, Jayme Lawson, Michael Cera, Emilia Jones	Based on The Running Man by Stephen King	
N O V E M B E R	12	Pose	Director: Jamie Adams; Cast: James McAvoy, Lucas Bravo, Aisling Franciosi, Almudena Amor		
N O V E M B E R	14	Jay Kelly	Director: Noah Baumbach; Cast: George Clooney, Adam Sandler, Grace Edwards, Laura Dern, Billy Crudup, Riley Keough, Jim Broadbent, Isla Fisher, Stacy Keach, Greta Gerwig	Netflix	
N O V E M B E R	28	Christmas Karma	Director: Gurinder Chadha; Cast: Charithra Chandran, Kunal Nayyar, Hugh Bonneville, Eva Longoria	A Christmas Carol by Charles Dickens	
N O V E M B E R	28	Pillion	Director: Harry Lighton Cast: Harry Melling, Alexander Skarsgård, Douglas Hodge, Lesley Sharp, Jake Shears,Anthony Welsh	Warner Bros. Pictures Based on Box Hill by Adam Mars-Jones	
D E C E M B E R	5	Fackham Hall	Director: Jim O'Hanlon; Cast: Damian Lewis, Thomasin McKenzie, Ben Radcliffe, Katherine Waterston, Tom Felton	Entertainment Film Distributors	
D E C E M B E R	5	Universal	Director: Stephen Portland; Cast: Joe Thomas, Kelley Mack, Rosa Robson		
D E C E M B E R	26	Bowie: The Final Act	Director: Jonathan Stiasny	Dogwoof; Based on the life of David Bowie	

=== Other premieres ===
Title	Director	Release date	Ref.
The Balloonists	John Dower	7 September 2025 (Toronto International Film Festival)	
Bank of Dave 2: The Loan Ranger	Chris Foggin	5 January 2025	
Dreamers	Joy Gharoro-Akpojotor	15 February 2025 (Berlin International Film Festival)	
I Saw the Face of God in the Jet Wash	Mark Jenkin	6 September 2025 (Toronto International Film Festival)	
IRKALLA: Dreams of Gilgamesh	Mohamed Al-Daradji	12 August 2025 (Locarno Film Festival)	
Marching Powder	Nick Love	7 March 2025	
Origin: The Story of the Basketball Africa League	Richard Brown, Tebogo Malope	8 September 2025 (Toronto International Film Festival)	
Sangre Del Toro	Yves Montmayeur	August 2025 (Venice Film Festival)	
The Theft of the Caravaggio	Joshua Cassar Gaspar	August 2025	

=== Culturally British films ===
The following list comprises films not produced by a British or UK film studio but is strongly associated with British culture. The films in this list should fulfil at least three of the following criteria:

- The film is adapted from a British source material.
- The story is at least partially set in the United Kingdom.
- The film was at least partially produced in the United Kingdom.
- Many of the film's cast and crew members are British.

Title	Country of origin	Adaptation	Story setting	Film locations	British cast and crew
Black Bag	United States		England	London, UK	Regé-Jean Page, Naomie Harris, Tom Burke, David Holmes
The Family Plan 2	United States		London, England	Watford and Shepperton, UK	Kit Harington, Sanjeev Bhaskar, Reda Elazouar, Daniel de Bourg, Simon Cellan Jones (director), Yan Miles (editor)
Frankenstein	United States	Frankenstein by Mary Shelley	Scotland	Edinburgh, UK	Mia Goth, David Bradley, Charles Dance
Hedda	United States		1950s England	United Kingdom	Imogen Poots, Tom Bateman, Nicholas Pinnock, Mirren Mack, Jamael Westman, Saffron Hocking, Sean Bobbitt (cinematographer)
Jingle Bell Heist	United States		England	London, UK	Connor Swindells, Lucy Punch, Peter Serafinowicz, Abby McDonald (screenwriter)
The King of Kings	United States	The Life of Our Lord by Charles Dickens	Victorian England		Kenneth Branagh, Roman Griffin Davis, Ben Kingsley

Mickey 17, Primate, Wake Up Dead Man and Wicked: For Good fulfill two of the criteria.

== See also ==
- Lists of British films
- 2025 in film
- 2025 in British music
- 2025 in British radio
- 2025 in British television
- 2025 in the United Kingdom
- List of British films of 2024
- List of British films of 2026
