= Mike Goodridge (film producer) =

British film producer and media executive

- Born: Michael Goodridge; England
- Occupations: Film producer; Media executive; Film journalist
- Years active: 1990–present

Mike Goodridge is a British film producer, media executive, and former journalist. He is known for his work as editor of Screen International, his tenure as chief executive officer of Protagonist Pictures and as the founder of the production company Good Chaos.

Goodridge was producer on Edward Berger's Ballad of A Small Player, Balthasar Kormakur's Touch, Laszlo Nemes' Orphan and Jalmari Helander's Sisu: Road to Revenge.

Goodridge was also co-producer on Golden Globe and Academy awards nominated film Triangle of Sadness and an executive producer on Academy awards nominated Quo Vadis, Aida?

== Career ==
=== Journalism ===
Goodridge began his career in film journalism in 1990 at The Business of Film, where he worked as editor. He later joined Screen International in 1994, holding roles including critic and editor.

He was based in Los Angeles for over 12 years, where he oversaw North American coverage for Screen International from 1997. During this time, he became a regular presence on the international film festival circuit, and served as vice-president of the Hollywood Foreign Press Association, as well as a member of the Los Angeles Film Critics Association.

In October 2009, Goodridge returned to London to serve as editor of Screen International and ScreenDaily.

During his time in journalism, Goodridge was also named International Journalist of the Year at the 44th annual ICG Publicists Awards.

=== Film ===
In May 2012, it was announced that Goodridge would leave his role at Screen International to become chief executive officer of Protagonist Pictures, a London-based international sales and financing company. Goodridge began the role in August 2012, working alongside chairman Nigel Williams.

In March 2017, Goodridge stepped down as chief executive officer, while remaining on the company's board of directors. During his tenure, the company was involved in a number of films, including Love & Friendship, Hunt For The Wilderpeople, American Honey, Lady Macbeth, The Lobster, God's Own Country, The Florida Project, and The Rider.

After leaving Protagonist Pictures, Goodridge founded the London-based production company Good Chaos, which became operational in 2020. Through the company, he has developed and produced a range of international projects, working across Europe and Asia with a focus on director-led films and co-productions. His projects include films Ruben Ostlund's Palme d'Or winner Triangle Of Sadness, Baltasar Kormakur's Touch, Sandhya Suri's Santosh, Jasmila Zbanic's Quo Vadis, Aida?, Kirill Serebrennikov's Tchaikovsky's Wife, Jessica Hausner's Club Zero, as well as Jalmari Helander's Sisu.

In June 2024, it was announced that Goodridge would produce The Revolution According to Kamo alongside Ilya Stewart. Directed by Kornél Mundruczó from a screenplay by Paweł Pawlikowski, Ben Hopkins and Kata Wéber, the Georgian-language historical drama explores the early life of Joseph Stalin through the perspective of his childhood friend Kamo. Goodridge and Stewart described the project as "an ambitious and chilling story" with contemporary political parallels.

In May 2025, Goodridge co-founded the production company Java Road with Nicholas Simon and author Lawrence Osborne, focusing on screen adaptations of Osborne's literary works.

In the same year, Goodridge was involved in multiple projects through Good Chaos including Edward Berger's Ballad of a Small Player, which premiered at the Telluride Film Festival; László Nemes' Orphan, which screened in competition at the Venice Film Festival; Imran Peretta's Ish, which was presented in the Venice Critics' Week section; and Helen Walsh's On the Sea, which premiered at the Edinburgh International Film Festival. He was also producer on Shih-Ching Tsou's Left-Handed Girl, which premiered in the Critics' Week section at the Cannes Film Festival. The film was also produced, co-written, and edited by Sean Baker, who had previously collaborated with Goodridge on The Florida Project. In addition, a sequel to Jalmari Helander's Sisu was released with Good Chaos involved in its production in collaboration with SubZero Film Entertainment.

==== Festival work ====
In January 2012, Goodridge was appointed as one of the programmers for a newly created section, Kinoscope, at the Sarajevo Film Festival, alongside Mathilde Henrot and Alessandro Raja. The section focused on international narrative and documentary films, excluding titles from southeastern Europe, which were reserved for the festival's main competition. He served as a programmer for the section until 2017.

In July 2017, Goodridge was appointed artistic director of the International Film Festival & Awards Macao (IFFAM), ahead of its second edition in December, 2017. In this role, he oversaw the festival's programming and introduced an international competition focused on first- and second-time directors, as well as initiatives such as the New Chinese Cinema section.

In February 2019, Goodridge was announced as a consultant for the Piazza Grande section of the Locarno Film Festival, working alongside artistic director Lili Hinstin and programmer Mathilde Henrot. In this role, he contributed to the programming of the festival's main open-air section, which showcases a range of international films, including genre and audience-focused titles.

Goodridge remained in the artistic director position of the International Film Festival & Awards Macao (IFFAM) for four editions, including a virtual edition in 2020 held due to the COVID-19 pandemic. In 2021, the festival was cancelled amid ongoing restrictions in Macau, and Goodridge subsequently stepped down. He described his tenure as "an incredible experience," noting the development of new audiences for international cinema in the region.

In August 2025, Goodridge was announced as international program advisor at the Red Sea International Film Festival, joining the programming team under director of international programs Fionnuala Halligan.

== Industry Perspective ==
In a February 2024 interview with the BBC's Today Programme, Goodridge stated that the United Kingdom's independent film sector faces increasing financial pressures, citing rising production costs and the impact of large-scale international productions on local filmmaking.

== Filmography ==
Year	Title	Role
2020	Quo Vadis, Aida?	Executive producer
2022	Tchaikovsky's Wife	Executive producer
2022	Triangle of Sadness	Co-producer
2022	Sisu	Executive producer
2023	Europa	Executive producer
2023	Northern Comfort	Co-producer
2023	Club Zero	Producer
2024	Sebastian	Executive producer
2024	Kong fang jian li de nv ren	Producer
2024	Santosh	Producer
2024	Touch	Producer
2025	On the Sea	Executive producer
2025	Ish	Executive producer
2025	Whitetail	Executive producer
2025	Shape of Momo	Executive producer
2025	Sukkwan Island	Co-producer
2025	Sisu: Road to Revenge	Producer
2025	Left-Handed Girl	Producer
2025	Orphan	Producer
2025	Ballad of a Small Player	Producer
2026	Shape of Momo	Executive Producer

== Works ==
Goodridge is the author of Filmcraft: Directing (2012), a book published by Focal Press/Ilex Press featuring interviews with film directors including Clint Eastwood, Guillermo del Toro, and Pedro Almodóvar. The book explores the craft of film directing through a series of discussions with contemporary filmmakers, examining their creative processes, working methods, and approaches to storytelling, as well as the broader challenges of balancing artistic vision with the practical demands of filmmaking.

=== Bibliography ===
- Goodridge, Mike (2002). Directing Screencraft. Rotovision. ISBN 978-2880465056.
- Goodridge, Mike; Grierson, Tim (2011). FilmCraft: Cinematography (1st ed.). Focal Press. ISBN 978-0240818627.
- Goodridge, Mike (2012). FilmCraft: Directing. Ilex Press. ISBN 978-1781570173.
