= Nicholas Simon =

Hungarian-American film producer based in Bangkok

- Born: 21 March 1969 (age 57); Rockford, Illinois, U.S.
- Occupation: Film producer
- Years active: 1995 - present
- Spouse: Shawn Simon (m. 2005; div. 2022)
- Children: 1

Nicholas Andrew Simon (born 21 March 1969), known professionally as Nicholas Simon, is a Hungarian-American film producer born in Rockford, Illinois, currently residing in Bangkok, Thailand. He has been producing feature films, TV series, and commercials in Southeast Asia for two and a half decades. For his work on City of Ghosts, A Prayer Before Dawn, Kong: Skull Island, Avengers: Infinity War, Simon has gained the title of “Hollywood’s man in Southeast Asia.”

Simon is known for being the founder and managing partner of two production companies, Indochina Productions and Studio Muso.

== Early life and education ==
An American-Hungarian dual national, Simon was born in Rockford, Illinois, and lived on a farm before moving with his family to Beloit, Wisconsin, at the age of three. He attended high school at Phillips Academy, graduating in 1987, before obtaining a B.A. at Columbia University in 1992, specializing in Asia.

Simon was also an active cycler, participating in the 1985 USCF Junior National Championships, the Phillips Academy Varsity Team from 1986 to 1987, and the Columbia University Team from 1991 to 1993.

In 2020, he acquired the certificate of completion for Stanford University's “Innovation and Entrepreneurship” program.

== Career ==
Simon arrived in Hanoi, Vietnam, via New York City in 1993 with the intent of becoming a journalist. However, he quickly realized he didn't enjoy writing and sought out other jobs. Simon eventually met the producers of Trần Anh Hùng’s Cyclo and helped out on the film in an informal capacity. In the following year, he founded Sud-Est Productions, a production company based in Vietnam. During his time, he serviced production for and co-produced numerous films, the most notable being Matt Dillon’s City of Ghosts. He sold Sud-Est Productions in 2003, and it is now a fully Vietnamese company.

While working as an independent industry consultant, Simon moved to Bangkok with his wife and daughter in 2009. In 2010, he founded Indochina Productions, which provides production services for projects in Southeast Asia. The company initially provided support for Thailand, Vietnam, Cambodia, and Laos, but now provides production services in 14 territories throughout Asia. It has since been dubbed by the NYFA as “the only company in Southeast Asia to produce and service big-budget Hollywood studio films and Fortune 500 advertising commercial needs.”

Simon has been the line producer for Indochina Productions on several major feature films, such as Spike Lee’s Da 5 Bloods and Sam Hargrave’s Extraction, and the executive producer for Indochina Productions on Hong Khaou’s Monsoon and Daniel Roby’s Target Number One. He is also known for his work as a line producer on Avengers: Infinity War and Avengers: Endgame as well as on Kong: Skull Island. Upcoming projects include adapting Jon Swain’s River of Time with Lawrence Osborne as the screenplay writer for a feature film, as well as Lawrence Osborne’s own Hunters in the Dark for the big screen.

Simon has been on the board of Luang Prabang Film Festival since 2012 and a member of the Producers Guild of America and the Production Guild UK since 2015.

In 2020, Simon also founded another production company, Studio Muso.

He has been a jurist and panelist at several industry events since 2003. He has also written op-eds for the Thai Enquirer.

== Filmography ==
Year	Film	Director	Role
1995	Cyclo	Trần Anh Hùng	Post-Production Producer/Special Thanks
1997	Distant Skies	Thierry Chabert	Line Producer, Vietnam
2000	The Vertical Ray of the Sun	Trần Anh Hùng	Line Producer
2003	City of Ghosts	Matt Dillon	Associate Producer
2003	Step into Liquid	Dana Brown	Line Producer, Vietnam
2003	What Alice Found	A. Dean Bell	Executive Producer (uncredited)
2004	The Beautiful Country	Hans Petter Moland	Line Producer, Vietnam
2005	Rx	Ariel Vromen	Producer
2010	Ultrasuede: In Search of Halston	Whitney Sudler-Smith	Producer
2010	The Best and the Brightest	Josh Shelov	Producer
2011	Transformers 3: Dark of the Moon	Michael Bay	Line Producer, Cambodia
2012	Act of Valor	Mike McCoy and Scott Waugh	Line Producer, Cambodia
2015	Pan	Joe Wright	Line Producer, Vietnam VFX Unit
2015	Kenzhe	Ermek Tursunov	Line Producer, Thailand
2015	Avengers: Age of Ultron	Joss Whedon/Scott Mahaffie (Second unit)	Line Producer, Bangladesh
2017	Lima	Neill Blomkamp	Line Producer, Thailand
2017	Kong: Skull Island	Jordan Vogt-Roberts	Line Producer, Vietnam
2017	A Prayer Before Dawn	Jean-Stephane Sauvaire	Producer
2017/ON HOLD	Hue 1968	Michael Mann	Co-Producer, Thailand and Vietnam
2018	Avengers: Infinity War	Russo brothers	Line Producer and Aerial Unit, The Philippines
2018	Les Confins Du Monde	Guillaume Nicloux	Co-Producer and Line Producer
2019	Buoyancy	Rodd Rathjen	Production Consultant, Cambodia
2019	Avengers: Endgame	Russo brothers	Line Producer and Aerial Unit, the Philippines
2019	Monsoon	Hong Khaou	Executive for Indochina Productions, Vietnam
2020	Extraction	Sam Hargrave	Line Producer for Indochina Productions, Thailand and Bangladesh
2020	Da 5 Bloods	Spike Lee	Line Producer for Indochina Productions, Vietnam
2020	Target Number One	Daniel Roby	Executive for Indochina Productions, Thailand
2020	Penguin Bloom	Glendyn Ivin	Executive for Indochina Productions
2021	Finding 'Ohana	Jude Weng	Line Producer for Indochina Productions, Thailand
2021	Hunters in the Dark	Simon Evan	Co-Producer
2021	River of Time	TBA	TBA
2023 (upcoming)	The Symphatizer	Park Chan-Wook	Co-Producer
2023	The Creator	Gareth Edwards	Co-Producer
2023	Deane's Dynasty	Patrick Carr	Producer, Co-Creator
2023	Meg 2	Ben Wheatley	Line Producer
2023	Mandalorian	Jon Favreau	Line Producer, Vietnam - Plate Unit
