= Archie Fisher (actor) =

British actor

- Education: Bristol Old Vic Theatre School
- Occupation: Actor
- Years active: 2024-present
- Television: Boarders

Archie Fisher is a British television and film actor.

== Early life ==
Fisher graduated from Bristol Old Vic Theatre School in 2023.

== Career ==
Fisher portrays the character Cheddar in British comedy television series Boarders, with the character returning for the third series in 2026.

Fisher had the role of Cal in 2025 drama film Steve alongside Cillian Murphy and Jay Lycurgo. Fisher played Reed in Justin Lin true life drama Last Days (2025). Fisher could be seen as Joe Brown in Netflix historical drama Death by Lightning.

In 2026, Fisher was cast as Ben in Peter Moffat crime drama Saviour.

== Filmography ==
Key
†	Denotes works that have not yet been released

Year	Title	Role	Notes
2024–2026	Boarders	Cheddar	18 episodes
2025	Last Days	Reed	Film
2025	Steve	Cal	Film
2025	Death by Lightning	Joe Brown	4 episodes
TBA	Saviour†	Ben	Lead role
