= Ken Mathis Lohatepanont =

Thai political analyst and journalist

Ken Mathis Lohatepanont (Thai: เมธิส โลหเตปานนท์) is a Thai political analyst and journalist, focused on Thailand's electoral system.

== Career ==
Ken has contributed to Thai Enquirer, Bangkok Post, and writes a Substack on Thai politics and policy, The Coffee Parliament.

He has extensively covered the 2025 Thai Political Crisis, including the aftermath of the People's Party-led vote of no confidence debate against Prime Minister Paetongtarn Shinawatra, and the Supreme Court's investigation into Thaksin Shinawatra's hospital stay.

== Publications ==
- A New Tale of Two Democracies? The Changing Urban-Rural Dynamics at Thailand's 2023 General Elections (2023)
- "Causes and Effects of Pheu Thai's Grand Compromise: The Lurking Instability of Thailand's Post-2023 Party System" (2024)
- After the Grand Compromise: Voter Profiles in Thai Politics (2025)
