= Saviour (TV series) =

British television series

- Genre: Crime drama
- Written by: Imran Mahmood
- Starring: Archie Fisher
- Country of origin: United Kingdom
- Original language: English
- No. of series: 1

Production
- Executive producers: Peter Moffat; Helen Ziegler; Nisha Parti
- Production companies: Parti Productions; Drama Republic; Banijay Rights

Original release
- Network: ITVX

Saviour is an upcoming British court room drama television series for ITVX written by Imran Mahmood and produced by Peter Moffat and Nisha Parti and starring Archie Fisher.

== Premise ==
Ben intervenes when a girl he knows is attacked but is mistaken for a police officer due to his fancy dress costume.

== Cast ==
- Archie Fisher as Ben
- Aidan Gillen as Eddie
- Anjli Mohindra as Indy Sangar
- Shaun Parkes as Jon Creasy
- Abhin Galeya as Dev Sangar
- Tobias Jowett as Sai Bajwa
- Adjani Salmon as Mac
- Claire Goose as Romy
- Nethra Tilakumara as Nita Sangar
- Angus Wright as Lionel Knight
- Campbell Wallace as Bing
- Precious Wura Alabi as Xenia Cruz

== Production ==
The series has Peter Moffat and Nisha Parti as executive producers and is written by former criminal barrister-turned-novelist Imran Mahmood. Helen Ziegler is overseeing production for ITVX.

The cast is led by Archie Fisher with Aidan Gillen, Anjli Mohindra and Shaun Parkes. Filming took place in Liverpool and Ramsbottom in February 2026, with filming taking place in Everton Park the following month. Cast and crew were spotted filming on location in Bolton town centre in April 2026.

== Broadcast ==
Saviour will be released on ITV1 and ITVX in 2027.
