= Beautiful Animals =

2017 novel by Lawrence Osborne

- Author: Lawrence Osborne
- Language: English
- Publication date: 2017

Beautiful Animals is a 2017 psychological thriller novel by British writer Lawrence Osborne, set on the Greek island of Hydra.

The novel was featured in July 2017 on the cover of the "New York Times Book Review" and reviewed by Katie Kitamura. It also received good reviews from Lionel Shriver in The Washington Post and from John Powers at NPR's Fresh Air.

The Hollywood Reporter announced in May 2018 that a film adaptation with Amazon Studios and American producer John Lesher was under way.
