= Steve (2025 film) =

Film by Tim Mielants

- Release poster
- Directed by: Tim Mielants
- Screenplay by: Max Porter
- Based on: Shy by Max Porter
- Produced by: Alan Moloney; Cillian Murphy
- Starring: Cillian Murphy; Tracey Ullman; Jay Lycurgo; Simbi Ajikawo; Emily Watson
- Cinematography: Robrecht Heyvaert
- Edited by: Danielle Palmer
- Music by: Ben Salisbury; Geoff Barrow
- Production company: Big Things Films
- Distributed by: Netflix (Worldwide); Volta Pictures (Ireland)
- Release dates: 5 September 2025 (TIFF); 19 September 2025 (United Kingdom); 3 October 2025 (Netflix)
- Running time: 92 minutes
- Countries: Ireland; United Kingdom
- Language: English

Steve is a 2025 drama film directed by Tim Mielants and written by Max Porter, based on his 2023 novella Shy. The film stars Cillian Murphy, Tracey Ullman, Jay Lycurgo, Simbi Ajikawo, and Emily Watson.

Steve had its world premiere in the Platform Prize section of the 2025 Toronto International Film Festival, and was released in select cinemas in the United Kingdom and the United States on 19 September 2025, before its streaming debut on 3 October 2025 by Netflix.

== Premise ==
Steve is a headteacher in charge of a school for boys with social and behavioural difficulties.

== Cast ==
- Cillian Murphy as Steve
- Tracey Ullman as Amanda
- Jay Lycurgo as Shy
- Simbi Ajikawo as Shola
- Emily Watson as Jenny
- Douggie McMeekin as Andy
- Youssef Kerkour as Owen
- Luke Ayres as Jamie
- Joshua J Parker as Riley
- Araloyin Oshunremi as Benny
- Tut Nyuot as Tarone
- Tom Moya as Paul
- Ahmed Ismail as Nabz
- Joshua Barry as Ash
- Archie Fisher as Posh Cal
- Ben Lloyd-Hughes as Julian
- Priyanga Burford as Kamila
- George Fouracres as Angus
- Marcus Garvey as Geoff
- Ruby Ashbourne-Serkis as Charlotte
- Roger Allam as Sir Hugh Montague Powell
- Amy Cudden as Claire

== Production ==
The project was announced for Netflix in February 2024 as being produced by Cillian Murphy's production company, Big Things Films, with his collaborator Alan Moloney also a producer. Tim Mielants directed, and Max Porter adapted his own novel Shy for the film. Murphy and Porter previously collaborated on the stage adaptation of Porter's Grief Is the Thing with Feathers and on the short film All of This Unreal Time. Porter gave Murphy a copy of Shy in a proof edition before it was completed and Murphy was quoted as saying "it just broke my heart. They're the sorts of things I love as a reader and as a performer". Jay Lycurgo also joined the cast.

Principal photography began on May 24, 2024, and wrapped on July 5 in the UK. Filming locations included Bath, Somerset.

== Release and reception ==
Steve was released in select theaters in the United Kingdom and in the United States on 19 September, before being released worldwide on Netflix on 3 October 2025.

=== Critical response ===
On the review aggregator website Rotten Tomatoes, 78% of 94 critics' reviews are positive, with an average rating of 6.7/10. The website's consensus reads: "A sobering drama that throws everything along with the kitchen sink at its doggedly determined hero, Steve's pileup of crises can strain credulity but Cillian Murphy's superb performance keeps it grounded in reality." Metacritic, which uses a weighted average, assigned the film a score of 66 out of 100, based on 25 critics, indicating "generally favorable" reviews.

Damon Wise for Deadline writes that the film "breezes by at a surprisingly brisk pace" and "packs a lot of deep thought into a seemingly slight tale."

=== Accolades ===
Award	Date of ceremony	Category	Recipient	Result	Ref.
British Independent Film Awards	November 30, 2025	Best Lead Performance	Cillian Murphy	Nominated	
British Independent Film Awards	November 30, 2025	Best Supporting Performance	Jay Lycurgo	Won	
Irish Film & Television Awards	February 20, 2026	Best Film	Steve	Nominated	
Irish Film & Television Awards	February 20, 2026	Best Lead Actor	Cillian Murphy	Nominated	
British Academy Film Awards	February 22, 2026	Outstanding British Film	Steve	Nominated	
National Film Awards UK	July 1, 2026	Best Drama	Steve	Won	
National Film Awards UK	July 1, 2026	Best Actor	Cillian Murphy	Nominated	
