= Max Porter (writer) =

English writer (born 1981)

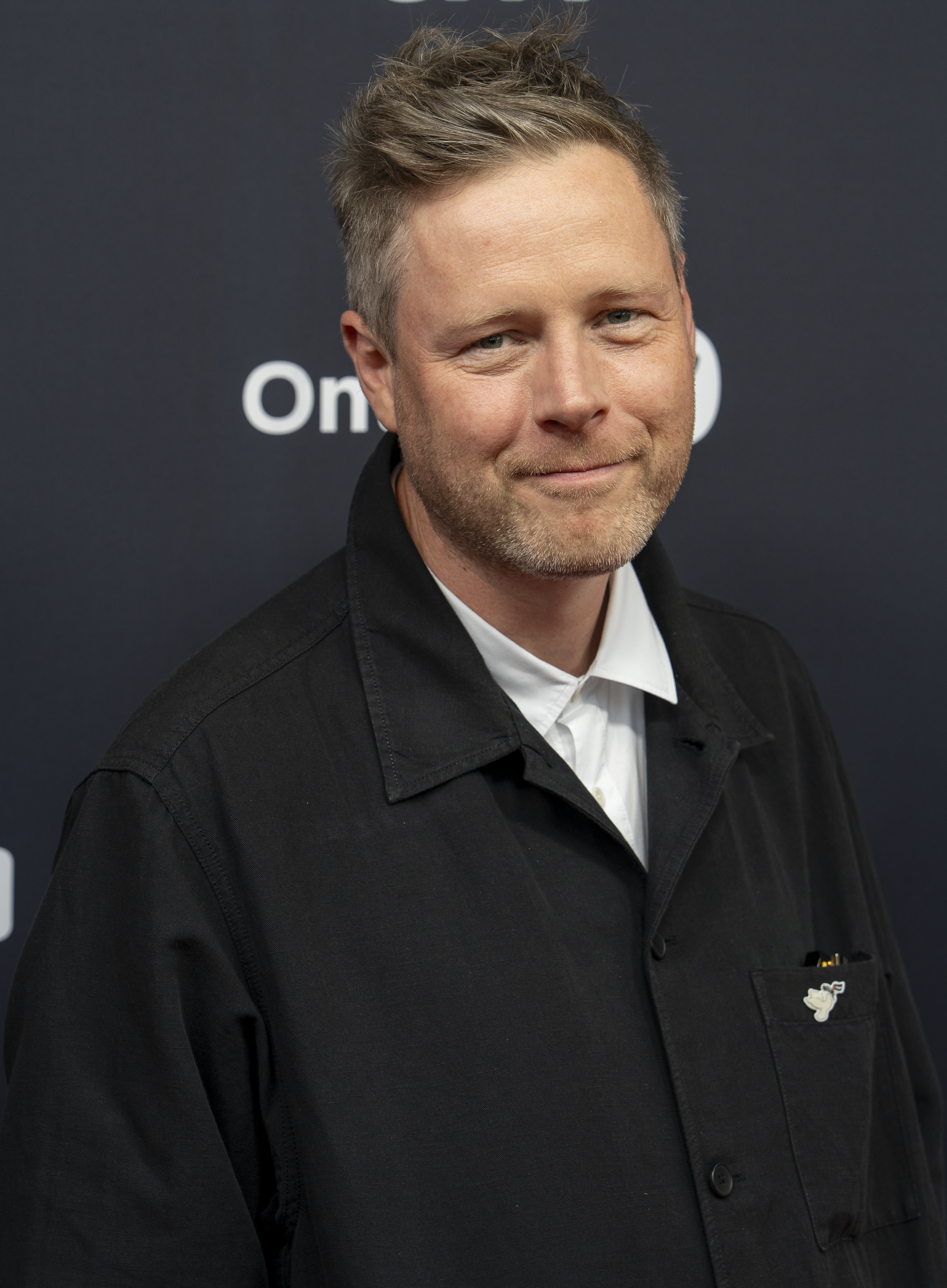
- Porter at the 2025 Toronto International Film Festival
- Born: 1981 (age 44–45); High Wycombe, England
- Education: Courtauld Institute of Art
- Occupations: Writer, former bookseller and editor
- Writing career
- Notable work: Grief Is the Thing with Feathers (2015)

Max Porter (born 1981) is an English writer, formerly a bookseller and editor, best known for his debut novel Grief Is the Thing with Feathers. He was elected a Fellow of the Royal Society of Literature in 2020.

== Background ==
Porter was born in High Wycombe, England, in 1981 and received a degree in History of Art at the Courtauld Institute of Art in London, followed by an MA for which he studied radical performance art, psychoanalysis, and feminism. Prior to his writing career, Porter managed the Chelsea branch of Daunt Books and jointly won the Sue Butterworth Young Bookseller of the Year Award in 2009, with Lisa Bird from Foyles. He was Editorial Director at Granta and Portobello Books until 2019, where he edited award-winning novels The Luminaries and The Vegetarian. During his tenure at Granta, his other authors included Mark O’Connell and Sarah Moss.

In 2019, Porter was named as a guest curator for the Cheltenham Literary Festival. He is chair of the International Booker Prize 2025 committee, is a 2025 Southbank Centre Associate Artist, and works with the library at HMP Erlestoke as their writer in residence 2024–5. In 2024, Porter joined Cillian Murphy, Mary Hickson, Bryce Dessner and Billy MagFhlionn as a co-curator of the Sounds From A Safe Harbour Festival in Cork, Ireland.

== Works ==
Grief Is the Thing with Feathers is a hybrid of prose and poetic styles about a crow who visits a grieving family of a Ted Hughes scholar and his two young boys. It draws heavily upon Hughes's Crow: From the Life and Songs of Crow and its title is derived from Emily Dickinson's "Hope is the thing with feathers". In 2016, Grief won the Sunday Times PFD Young Writer of the Year Award, the Books Are My Bag Readers' Award for fiction, the 2016 Dylan Thomas Prize, and the 2017 Europese Literatuurprijs. It was also shortlisted for the Guardian First Book Award and the Goldsmiths Prize for experimental writing. Reviewing for The Guardian, Sarah Crown writes that the book "is heartrending, blackly funny, deeply resonant, a perfect summation of what it means to lose someone but still to love the world – and if it reminds publishers that the best books aren’t always the ones that can be pigeonholed or precised or neatly packaged, so much the better". It has been translated into twenty-seven languages.

Grief Is the Thing with Feathers was adapted into a play of the same name, directed by Enda Walsh and starring Cillian Murphy, which premiered in Dublin on 25 March 2019 and has been performed in London and New York. In an interview, Porter details the experience of adapting Grief for the stage: "[w]ith both Cillian and Enda, the goal was to make the production as true as it could be to the book. There were no changed endings or swapping one feature for another". Cillian Murphy won an Irish Times Theatre Award for "Best Actor" for his performance as the grieving father. The play was a New York Times Critic's Pick, with Ben Brantley writing that the performance "beautifully evoke[s] the way in which the whole world seems apocalyptic after a personal tragedy".

The feature film The Thing With Feathers, based on Porter’s novel Grief Is the Thing with Feathers, premiered at Sundance 2025. The film was written and directed by Dylan Southern, and stars Benedict Cumberbatch. Despite Cumberbatch's initial scepticism regarding a film adaptation, he told Deadline he was won over by Southern's script: "Dylan has handled the deftness of Max’s kinetic poetry masterfully. [...] It holds all the wildly sharp turns of changing tones and colors between the domestic and mythic, between the despair, comedy, and everyday loss."

On 5 March 2019, Porter's second book Lanny was published by Faber and longlisted for the Wainwright Prize 2019 and Man Booker Prize 2019, and was shortlisted for the Gordon Burn Prize 2019. Faber describes Lanny as "a story about a family whose village is peopled by the living and the dead. It's a story about a boy with a gift for friendship and the traces of enchantment he leaves in the closely woven lives around him". The book examines rural English community life and childhood myth in response to social division and ecological crisis. The book is set to be adapted into a film starring Rachel Weisz.

In 2021, Faber released The Death of Francis Bacon, a hybrid poetic prose work about which the publishers write: “ … in seven extraordinary written pictures … Max Porter translates the explosive final workings of the artist’s mind". The Death of Francis Bacon is set during the last days of Francis Bacon's life as he lies dying in Madrid and is written in visceral poetic language which corresponds to Bacon's style of painting. Porter describes the text as an "attempt to write as painting, not about it; an attempt to replicate thought, struggle, the struggle of thought, but also the sheer energy of the eye's confrontation with the painted image", which is "the result of a long preoccupation [...] with Francis Bacon". Writing for The Scotsman, Stuart Kelly claims that the hybrid work is "not a novel, art criticism or biography" but maintains that it is "a very moving depiction of a mind in dissolution at the very edge of death", noting the influence of Dylan Thomas on Porter's "apocalyptic" style of writing.

Porter's fourth novel, Shy – "the polyphonic story of a troubled teenager" – was published in April 2023 in the UK. It was described by The Irish Times as "a perfect book", which "enthusiastically embrace[s] the lessons of modernism". Porter's own adaptation of the novel, titled Steve, was filmed in 2024 and will be distributed globally by Netflix. It was directed by Tim Mielants, stars Cillian Murphy and Jay Lycurgo, and was produced by Murphy and Alan Moloney’s company Big Things Films.

In July 2026, Faber & Faber announced the publication of his novel Burn and Rave, which will be available in February 2027.

== Bibliography ==
=== Novels/novellas ===
- Grief Is the Thing with Feathers (2015)
- Lanny (2019)
- The Death of Francis Bacon (2021)
- Shy (2023)
- Burn and Rave (2027)

=== Short stories ===
- "Eltham Palace" in Eight Ghosts: The English Heritage Book Of New Ghost Stories (2017, also featuring Kate Clanchy, Stuart Evers, Mark Haddon, Andrew Michael Hurley, Sarah Perry, Kamila Shamsie, and Jeanette Winterson)
- "Brother: State of Mind" in Granta Magazine
- "The Part-Time Countryman" in Pursuit: The Balvenie Stories Collection, edited by Alex Preston (2019)
- "Even As We Plunged Down the Hill" in We'll Never Have Paris, edited by Andrew Gallix (2019)
- "RAT" (flash fiction) in TANK Magazine
- "Daughter" in the inaugural edition of INQUE (limited print run, 2021)

=== Poetry ===
- "Kneeling Shepherd (i.m. David Miller)" in The Guardian (2017)
- "Myth of the Mole", with S.J. Fowler, in POETRY (2019)

=== Non-fiction ===
- "Dying on the Toilet", an essay on Francis Bacon's painting Triptych May–June 1973 (2016)
- "When I Lost My Father, I Lost His Voice Too", personal essay on BuzzFeed (2016)
- Studies for Studies (2017, contributor: by artist Catrin Morgan)
- Jerome’s Study (2018, with Catrin Morgan)
- 'Max Porter on Paul McCarthy's "Piccadilly Circus: Fan Letter", Frieze Issue 200 (2019)
- "How My Son's Love for Crystal Palace Made Me Fall For Football", autobiographical essay in Mundial
- "It Could Be Any Book" in The Gifts of Reading: An Anthology of Essays About the Joys of Reading, Giving and Receiving Books, curated by Jennie Orchard (2020)
- "Spirit D'escalier the Size of a Country", for the Aitken Alexander Isolation Series (April 2020)
- "It's So Good" (March 2021)

=== Miscellaneous ===
- "Ground" in Nicola Hicks: Keep Dark (2018)
- It's Going To Be A Bright New Day: Would You Rather, with Bonnie Prince Billy (2020, pamphlet)
- Lyrics for 'Bed in the River' by Joan Shelley (May 2020)
- "MAN" and "WOMAN" lyrics for album DEAD CLUB by Tunng (2020)
- Lyrics for EP Three Feral Pieces by Bonnie "Prince" Billy and Nathan Salsburg (April 2021)
- The Hill, a collaboration with Hilary Paynter (2023)
- All of this Unreal Time (film and art installation, Manchester International Festival, July 2021) Written by Max Porter, featuring Cillian Murphy (actor), directed by Aoife McArdle (director), music by Aaron Dessner, Bryce Dessner, and Jon Hopkins. The book was published by Rough Trade Books in 2024, with a foreword by Cillian Murphy.
- Wild West, a poem about the arms trade published in TOLKA (2022), and performed at Palfest in December 2023
- The Photographer, a five-part audio drama for BBC Radio 4 (2024)
