= The Word for Snow =

One act play by Don DeLillo

- Original language: English
- Written by: Don DeLillo
- Characters: A pilgrim A professor
- Mute: Jasper Britton

Premiere
- Date: 27 October 2007; 18 years ago

The Word for Snow is a one-act play by Don DeLillo. Inspired by global climate change, the play concerns a pilgrim who seeks out a professor who has fallen silent.

The play was commissioned by the Chicago Humanities Festival and premiered on October 27, 2007, in a production by the Steppenwolf Theatre Company. Subsequent to a West End production in 2012, Manhattan's Karma book store published the manuscript in 2014.

== Adaptation ==
The play was adapted into a film titled Mare's Nest by Ben Rivers, which had its world premiere at the 78th Locarno Film Festival in August 2025.
