= Billy Moore (boxer) =

Former Muay Thai legend of English origin

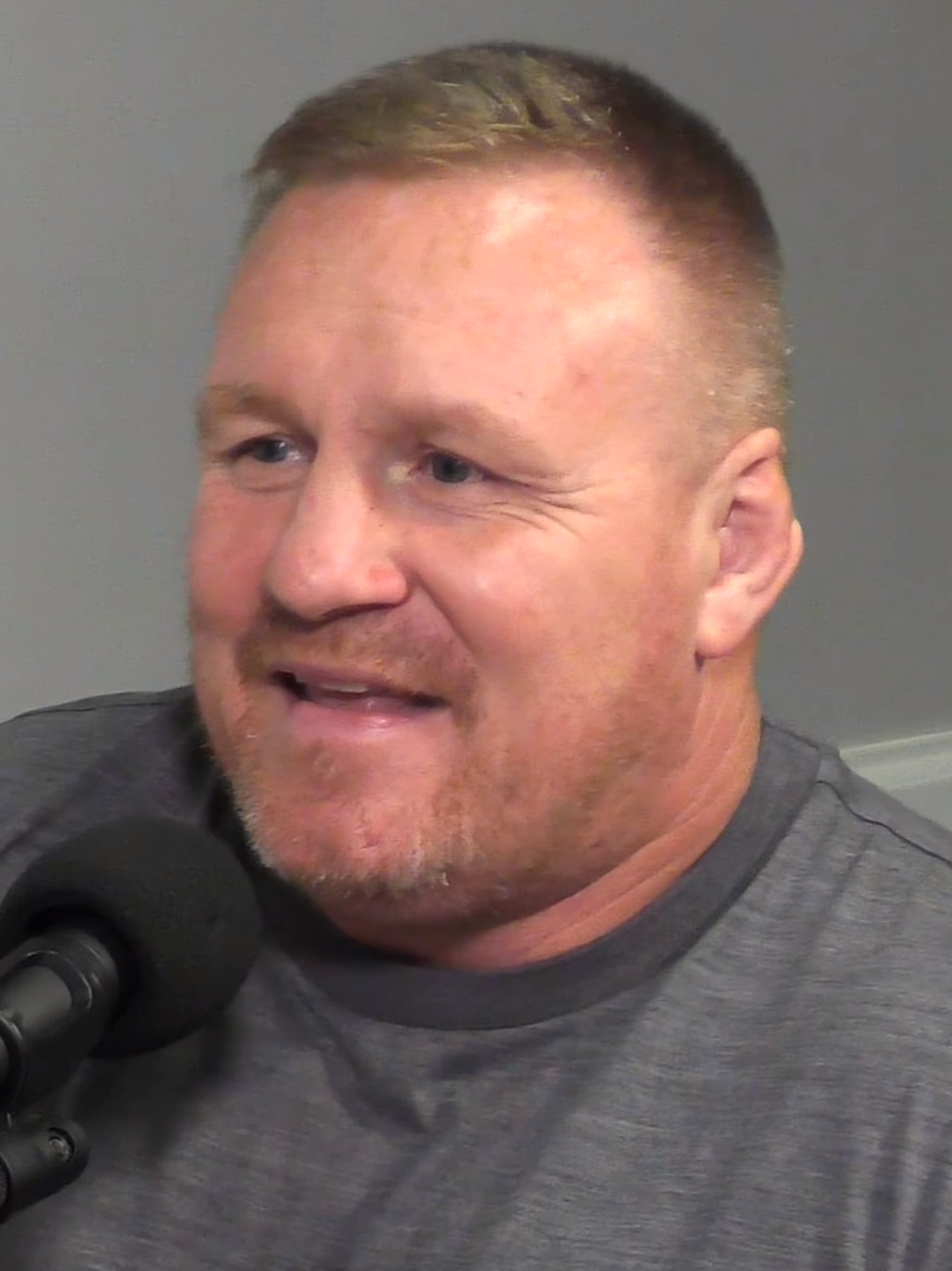
Moore in 2021

Billy Moore is a YouTuber, Podcaster, actor and former English boxer, who was later active as a Muay Thai fighter in Thailand.

== Early life ==
Moore grew up in poverty on a council estate in Liverpool. He explains in his memoir A Prayer Before Dawn (2011) that he often felt isolated, being told he was worthless by his "alcoholic father". He began to fall into a life of crime by age 16, stealing cars, committing burglaries, and getting involved in drugs.

== Life in Thailand ==
After getting clean with the help of a rehab programme, Moore took a trip to Thailand as a means to turn his life around, hoping to give up drugs and alcohol and burglary, and start fresh as a boxer and stunt man. He arrived in Thailand in 2005 and taught English there. While he was clean, he even worked as a stunt double for Sylvester Stallone on Rambo IV. It was when he got back into fighting there that he became involved with drugs and crime. He had started to train in Muay Thai boxing, the country's national sport. "I got involved with underground fighting and found bad company again." He became addicted to crystal meth and ya ba (a highly addictive methamphetamine).

After being convicted of stealing a mobile phone, he was imprisoned in Chiang Mai Central Prison and later transferred to the notorious Klong Prem Central Prison in Bangkok. He received a 3-year sentence. On his first night in prison he was placed in a cell with a dead body. He became involved with the prison's Muay Thai training team as a way to escape the gang violence of the prison. Moore is quoted as saying "It became like family orientated, and he invited me into their gym, took care of me, sat with me, broke bread with me".

== Repatriation ==
He was repatriated to the United Kingdom in 2010. Moore credits his recovery to Prisoners Abroad and Narcotics Anonymous. Moore currently lives in Liverpool.

On 27 April 2026, Moore was involved in a physical altercation at a gym in Merseyside.

== In popular culture ==
The 2017 film A Prayer Before Dawn is a biopic based on Moore's life in prison, adapted from his memoir. Moore is portrayed by Joe Cole, and he makes a brief cameo at the end of the film, portraying his father.

Moore now has a podcast dealing with addiction in the UK (and abroad)..

== Books ==
- A Prayer Before Dawn (2011)
- Fighting For My Life (2020)
