= A Spell to Ward Off the Darkness =

- Film poster
- Directed by: Ben Russell; Ben Rivers
- Written by: Ben Russell; Ben Rivers
- Produced by: Julie Gayet; Indrek Kasela; Nadia Turincev
- Starring: Robert Aiki Aubrey Lowe
- Music by: Robert Aiki Aubrey Lowe
- Production companies: Must Käsi; Rouge International
- Release date: August 8, 2013 (Locarno)
- Running time: 98 minutes
- Language: English

A Spell To Ward Off the Darkness is a 2013 experimental film directed by Ben Russell and Ben Rivers, starring Robert Aiki Aubrey Lowe. It was released to critical acclaim, winning two awards, including the Copenhagen International Documentary Festival New Vision Award, and having five nominations.

== Outline ==
Experimental ambient musician Robert Aiki Aubrey Lowe undertakes a long, enduring experience living in and moving through three distinct Scandinavian environments: a commune in Estonia which he is a member of, a wild forest in Northern Finland which he explores in solitude, and, finally, a neo-pagan black metal performance in Norway which Lowe himself participates in.

== Filming ==
Filming took place in three locations: on the island of Vormsi in Estonia, in the wilderness of the northern municipality of Hyrynsalmi in Finland, and in Oslo, Norway. The sequence featuring the Norwegian black metal band Queequeg was filmed in a single take. The band, featuring Lowe on vocals and guitar, was formed specifically for the movie. It also stars Haela Ravenna Hunt-Hendrix of Liturgy, Nick McMaster of Krallice, and legendary experimental artist Weasel Walter.

== Release ==
The film was first shown at the Locarno International Film Festival in Switzerland on 8 August 2013. It has subsequently been shown at the Toronto International Film Festival in Canada, the BFI London Film Festival in the United Kingdom, the Thessaloniki International Film Festival in Greece (under the title Ena xorki gia na dioxeis to skotadi), the AFI Fest in the United States, the Copenhagen International Documentary Festival in Denmark, the Torino Film Festival in Italy, the International Film Festival Rotterdam in the Netherlands, the Vilnius International Film Festival in Lithuania (under the title Kerai nuo tamsos), the New Directors/New Films Festival in the US, the Karlovy Vary International Film Festival in the Czech Republic, the New Horizons Film Festival in Poland (under the title Zaklecie, ktore odpedza ciemnosc), and the Three Rivers Film Festival in the US. It has also seen release in Spain on 6 November 2014, the United States on 5 December 2014 and France on 18 March 2015.

== Reception ==
The film received a score of 95% out of 19 reviews on review aggregator website Rotten Tomatoes, with an average score of 6.94/10.

Reviewing the film for The New York Times, Ben Kenigsberg called the film "accessible and often hypnotic on an intuitive level." Alan Scherstuhl of The Village Voice praised the first two-thirds of the film but disliked the final segment, criticizing its focus on "a shriek-y metal band that plays on and on."

| Organization | Award category | Recipients and nominees | Result |
|---|---|---|---|
| Copenhagen International Documentary Festival | New Vision Award | Ben Rivers; Ben Russell | Won |
| Jihlava International Documentary Film Festival | Silver Eye Award for Best Feature Documentary | Ben Rivers; Ben Russell | Nominated |
