= Ballad of a Small Player =

British psychological thriller film

- Release poster
- Directed by: Edward Berger
- Screenplay by: Rowan Joffé
- Based on: The Ballad of a Small Player by Lawrence Osborne
- Produced by: Mike Goodridge; Edward Berger; Mathew James Wilkinson
- Starring: Colin Farrell; Fala Chen; Deanie Ip; Alex Jennings; Tilda Swinton
- Cinematography: James Friend
- Edited by: Nick Emerson
- Music by: Volker Bertelmann
- Production companies: Good Chaos; Nine Hours; Stigma Films
- Distributed by: Netflix
- Release dates: 29 August 2025 (Telluride); 17 October 2025 (United Kingdom)
- Running time: 102 minutes
- Country: United Kingdom
- Languages: English; Cantonese

Ballad of a Small Player is a 2025 British black comedy psychological thriller film directed by Edward Berger from a screenplay by Rowan Joffé, based on the 2014 novel The Ballad of a Small Player by Lawrence Osborne. The film stars Colin Farrell, Fala Chen, Deanie Ip, Alex Jennings, and Tilda Swinton.

Ballad of a Small Player had its world premiere at the 52nd Telluride Film Festival on 29 August 2025, and was released in select cinemas in the United States on 15 October 2025, and in the United Kingdom on 17 October 2025, before its streaming debut by Netflix on 29 October 2025. The film received mixed reviews from critics, while Farrell's performance received praise.

== Plot ==
Brendan Reilly, a disgraced Irish financier posing as the aristocratic "Lord Doyle," lives in Macau after fleeing his financial crimes in the United Kingdom. An inveterate gambler, Reilly floats between luxury hotels and opulent casinos, relying on his wealthy persona to stave off creditors as he grows increasingly dependent on alcohol, superstition, and the fleeting thrill of gambling.

Reilly's behavior draws notice from casino employees and affluent regulars, who regard him as a gweilo, a "white ghost". With mounting debts and dwindling funds, he continues to try his luck at the baccarat tables. There Reilly meets Dao Ming, an enigmatic credit broker.

Comforted by Reilly after one of her despondent clients jumps to his death, a guilt-stricken Dao brings him to a temple on the water for the first night of the Ghost Festival. Though she fears her own luck has run out, Reilly believes his fortune can turn in both their favors. However, he wakes up alone with a number written on his hand.

As his losing streak continues, Reilly is tracked down by British investigator Cynthia Blithe, who gives him until the following day to pay back the funds he embezzled in his former life, or be deported to stand trial. Unable to find Dao, he approaches fellow expatriate con man Adrian Lippett for help, only to realize he is cooperating with Blithe, and contemplates suicide. The increasingly desperate and delirious Reilly dines voraciously at a restaurant he cannot afford as he anxiously waits out his deadline, and is seemingly reunited with Dao as he suffers a heart attack.

Reilly awakens in a floating home on Lamma Island where Dao nurses him back to health. Growing close as they confide their deepest regrets to each other, she suggests they are kindred spirits. Left on his own, Reilly realizes the number on his hand is the combination to Dao's locked shed, where he discovers sacks of money submerged underwater.

Unable to stop himself, Reilly takes the cash to the casinos and finds himself on an improbable winning streak. He pays off his hotel debts, but the supernatural nature of his success results in his banishment from all of Macau’s casinos. So, the ravenous Reilly fears he has become a hungry ghost.

Convincing his hotel to let him place a final $8 million bet on a single hand of baccarat, Reilly urges Blithe to take the money he owes her client to pursue her own new life. His game is unexpectedly joined by Lippett, who poses as an Italian prince to match his bet, but victory falls to Reilly. Leaving Blithe with her repayment and a kiss, Reilly departs with his winnings in search of Dao. Fellow gambler Grandma offers him a game with 100-to-1 odds, but he declines, and she reveals that Dao drowned herself on the first night of the festival.

Realizing that his experiences with Dao were hallucinations, Reilly leaves behind his lucky gloves and returns to the temple, burning all his money as an offering. Standing at the water’s edge amid the festival fireworks, his reflection appears to become Dao herself, as Reilly remains haunted by her ghost. During the credits, he and Blithe share a surreal dance in the hotel ballroom.

== Cast ==
- Colin Farrell as Brendan Reilly / "Lord Doyle"
- Fala Chen as Dao-Ming
- Tilda Swinton as Cynthia Blithe
- Deanie Ip as "Grandma"
- Alex Jennings as Adrian Lippett
- Jason Tobin as Mr. Huang

Additionally, Anthony Wong makes a cameo appearance as an executive of the Macanese casino.

== Production ==
=== Development ===
The film is directed by Edward Berger and written by Rowan Joffé, based on Lawrence Osborne's 2014 novel The Ballad of a Small Player. Mike Goodridge produced the film for Good Chaos, along with Berger for Nine Hours, as well as Matthew James Wilkinson.

=== Casting ===
In April 2024, Colin Farrell was cast in the lead role. Later that month, Tilda Swinton joined the cast. In May 2024, Fala Chen joined the cast. In May 2025, Deannie Yip and Alex Jennings were also cast.

=== Filming ===
Principal photography began on 26 June 2024, in Macau and Hong Kong and wrapped on 25 August.

== Release ==
It had its world premiere at the 52nd Telluride Film Festival on 29 August 2025. It also screened in the Special Presentations section of the 2025 Toronto International Film Festival on 9 September 2025.

== Reception ==
=== Critical response ===
On the review aggregator website Rotten Tomatoes, 49% of 150 critics' reviews are positive, with an average rating of 5.4/10. The website's consensus reads: "Going all in with a committed Colin Farrell and a memorably opulent presentation of Macau, Ballad of a Small Player too often squanders its virtues by doubling down on excess to diminishing returns." Metacritic, which uses a weighted average, assigned the film a score of 46 out of 100, based on 29 critics, indicating "mixed or average" reviews.

=== Accolades ===
Award	Date of ceremony	Category	Nominee(s)	Result	Ref.
Irish Film & Television Awards	20 February 2026	Best Lead Actor – Film	Colin Farrell	Nominated	
Make-Up Artists & Hair Stylists Guild	14 February 2026	Best Contemporary Hair Styling (Feature-Length Motion Picture)	Alex Kwan and Heike Merker	Nominated	
Middleburg Film Festival	19 October 2025	Spotlight Actor Award	Colin Farrell	Honored	
National Film Awards	1 July 2026	Best Thriller	Ballad of a Small Player	Nominated	
San Sebastián International Film Festival	27 September 2025	Golden Seashell	Ballad of a Small Player	Nominated	
Zurich Film Festival	27 September 2025	Golden Icon Award	Colin Farrell	Honored	
