= On the Sea (film) =

2025 British drama film

- Poster
- Directed by: Helen Walsh
- Written by: Helen Walsh
- Produced by: David A. Hughes; David Moores; Chris Clark; Mike Goodridge
- Starring: Barry Ward; Lorne MacFadyen; Henry Lawfull; Celyn Jones
- Cinematography: Sam Goldie
- Edited by: Ricardo Saraiva
- Music by: Felix Rösch
- Production company: Red Union Films
- Distributed by: Matchbox Films; Verve Pictures
- Release dates: August 16, 2025 (Edinburgh); July 24, 2026 (United Kingdom)
- Running time: 111 minutes
- Country: United Kingdom
- Language: English

On the Sea is a 2025 British drama film written and directed by Helen Walsh. The film stars Barry Ward, Lorne MacFadyen, and Henry Lawfull.

The film premiered in competition at the 78th Edinburgh International Film Festival on 16 August 2025, and was released on 24 July 2026.

== Premise ==
Set in a remote fishing community in North Wales, the film follows Jack, a mussel harvester who expects his son to continue the family trade. Tensions arise when his son resists this expectation, and the arrival of a new deckhand further complicates relationships within the community. As personal and familial dynamics unfold, the story explores themes of identity, desire and belonging.

== Cast ==
- Barry Ward as Jack
- Lorne MacFadyen as Daniel
- Henry Lawfull as Tom
- Liz White
- Celyn Jones
- Danny Webb
- Julian Lewis Jones as William

== Production ==
Written and directed by Helen Walsh, the film was loosely inspired by a real-life individual known to Walsh. The project developed further when Walsh incorporated the setting of mussel harvesting communities in North Wales, which informed the film's narrative and themes.

The film was produced on a budget of under £1 million and shot with a small crew using a scaled-down production approach. International sales for the film are handled by The Yellow Affair.

== Release ==
On the Sea had its world premiere at the 78th Edinburgh International Film Festival on 16 August 2025. It had its North America premiere at the 37th Palm Springs International Film Festival. The film was released in UK cinemas by Matchbox Films and Verve Pictures on 24 July 2026.

== Reception ==
=== Critical response ===
On the review aggregator website Rotten Tomatoes, 77% of 13 critics' reviews are positive.

In a review for Film Threat, critic Alan Ng described the film as "pretty typical" of coming-out narratives, criticizing its romantic development as lacking buildup and stating that it "just feels dated and done before."

In a review for Variety, the film was described as a character-driven drama with a strong sense of place, noting its performances and its portrayal of a late-in-life coming-out story with emotional restraint and realism.

Nikki Baughan of Screen Daily described the film as a character-driven drama focused on identity and relationships within a traditional coastal community, highlighting its restrained storytelling, performances, and use of setting to shape the narrative.

=== Accolades ===
Award / Festival	Year	Category	Recipient(s)	Result	Ref.
BFI Flare: London LGBTIQ+ Film Festival	2026	Hearts Strand — Official Competition	On the Sea	Nominated	
CineEco – Serra da Estrela International Environmental Film Festival	2026	Grande Prémio Ambiente — International Competition/Feature Film	On the Sea	Nominated	
Edinburgh International Film Festival	2025	Sean Connery Prize for Feature Filmmaking Excellence	On the Sea	Nominated	
FilmOut San Diego	2026	Best International Feature	On the Sea	Won	
Frameline Film Festival	2026	Audience Award — Narrative Feature	On the Sea	Nominated	
Guadalajara International Film Festival	2026	Maguey Award — Best Feature Film	On the Sea	Nominated	
Lovers Film Festival	2026	Audience Award — Best Film	On the Sea	Won	
Lovers Film Festival	2026	All the Lovers Award — Best Feature Film	On the Sea	Nominated	
Queer Expression Film Festival	2026	Gay Movie of the Month Award	On the Sea	Won	
Palm Springs International Film Festival	2026	New Voices/New Visions Grand Jury Prize	On the Sea	Nominated	
Pink Apple Awards	2026	Audience Award — Best Feature Film	On the Sea	Nominated	
Roze Filmdagen Amsterdam	2026	Audience Award — Best Feature Film	On the Sea	Nominated	
Thessaloniki International Film Festival	2025	Golden Alexander — International Competition	On the Sea	Nominated	
Thessaloniki International Film Festival	2025	Best Music — Special Mention	Felix Rösch	Won	

== See also ==
- List of LGBTQ-related films of 2025
- List of LGBT-related films directed by women
