= A Prayer Before Dawn (film) =

2017 film

- Theatrical release poster
- Directed by: Jean-Stéphane Sauvaire
- Written by: Jonathan Hirschbein; Nick Saltrese
- Based on: A Prayer Before Dawn: My Nightmare in Thailand's Prisons by Billy Moore
- Produced by: Roy Boulter; Rita Dagher; Sol Papadopoulos; Nicholas Simon
- Starring: Joe Cole
- Cinematography: David Ungaro
- Edited by: Marc Boucrot
- Music by: Nicolas Becker
- Production companies: Indochina Productions; Meridan Entertainment; HanWay Films; Symbolic Exchange; Canal+; Senorita Films; Ciné+
- Distributed by: A24 DirecTV Cinema (United States); Altitude (United Kingdom); Wild Bunch (France)
- Release dates: 19 May 2017 (Cannes); 20 July 2018 (United Kingdom); 10 August 2018 (United States)
- Running time: 117 minutes
- Countries: United Kingdom; United States; France; China
- Language: English
- Box office: $958,883

A Prayer Before Dawn is a 2017 biographical prison drama film directed by Jean-Stéphane Sauvaire and written by Jonathan Hirschbein and Nick Saltrese. The film stars Joe Cole and is based on the book A Prayer Before Dawn: My Nightmare in Thailand's Prisons by Billy Moore.

A Prayer Before Dawn had its world premiere at the 2017 Cannes Film Festival on 19 May, and was released in the United Kingdom on 20 July 2018, by Altitude, and in the United States on 10 August 2018, by A24.

== Plot ==
Billy Moore, a young British boxer and troubled heroin addict, is arrested in Thailand and charged with possession of stolen goods and a firearm.

Incarcerated in Klong Prem prison, he is quickly subjected to the horrors of Thai prison life, including being moved into a crowded cell ruled by cell leader Keng, being forced to sleep next to a corpse and witnessing at knifepoint the rape of a fellow inmate. His interactions with the other prisoners and staff are tense; at one point, he goes into a violent frenzy and bites a corrections officer's neck for being refused painkillers. After his punishment, Billy attempts to befriend a transgender prisoner named Fame. Life in prison worsens for Billy and he retreats into heavy drug abuse. He subsequently beats two Muslim chefs close to death after being bribed with ya ba by a corrupt prison officer.

Billy's mental health ultimately deteriorates and he attempts suicide by slitting his wrist with a shiv, though he survives after an inmate saves his life. Driven by a desperate need to fight and battle his demons, Billy eventually joins the boxing team with the help of Fame, with whom he becomes intimate with. He quickly adapts to the art of Muay Thai, winning his first bout in a close, hard-fought battle. Impressed by his performance, the prison warden, Preecha, transfers him to the boxing team cell, becoming the first foreigner to compete in the national Muay Thai tournament and represent the prison.

He soon develops a camaraderie with the other boxers and receives a Sak Yant on his back. However, he is ambushed by Keng and his gang, who threaten him with a pin prick attack if he loses. Worse, it emerges that Billy is suffering from a hernia caused by his drug abuse and any further damage could result in severe internal bleeding. Nevertheless, he still wants to compete. The resulting match is gruelling, with Billy taking multiple shots to the stomach and being fouled by his opponent. However, he manages to knock his opponent out with a spinning back elbow. Despite his victory, the physical trauma is too much, and he ends up vomiting blood and passing out.

Billy is quickly rushed to a hospital outside of prison grounds. After waking up, he sneaks out of the building and wanders into the city, but soon reconsiders and returns unnoticed. After being transferred to another ward, he meets his father (played by the real Billy Moore) and the two men exchange a solemn smile.

The closing titles reveal that, after serving three years, Billy Moore was transferred to a UK prison and released on amnesty by the King of Thailand in October 2010. Since his release, he has devoted his life to helping other addicts and maintaining his own recovery.

== Cast ==
- Joe Cole as Billy Moore
- Pornchanok Mabklang as "Fame"
- Panya Yimmumphai as Keng
- Somluck Kamsing as Trainer
- Vithaya Pansringarm as Officer Preecha
- Chaloemporn Sawatsuk as "M"
- Billy Moore as Billy's Father

== Production ==
In October 2014, Charlie Hunnam would star in the film, with Jean-Stéphane Sauvaire directing from a screenplay written by Jonathan Hirschbein and Nick Saltrese, based upon a memoir written by Billy Moore. Rita Dagher, Sol Papadopoulos, and Roy Boutler will serve as producers on their Senorita Films banner, alongside HanWay Films. In October 2015, Joe Cole joined the cast of the film, replacing Hunnam.

Thai authorities denied permission to film in the real Chiang Mai Central Prison and Klong Prem Central Prison, where Moore served his sentences, so production decided to film scenes set in both prisons at Nakhon Pathom prison, which was decommissioned in 2014 and now acts as a museum. The climax, however, was filmed at the courtyard of the Cebu Provincial Detention and Rehabilitation Center, known for the CPDRC Dancing Inmates. Several of CPDRC's inmates participated in the shoot.

== Release ==
A Prayer Before Dawn: A Nightmare in Thailand was first published in 2014 by Maverick House, Dublin, Ireland. In February 2017, A24 acquired U.S. distribution rights to the film. In April 2017, Altitude Film Distribution acquired UK distribution rights to the film. The film had its world premiere at the Cannes Film Festival on 15 May 2017. It went onto screen at South by Southwest on 12 March 2018.

It was released in the United Kingdom on 20 July 2018, and in the United States through DirecTV Cinema on 12 July 2018, before being released in a limited release on 10 August 2018.

== Reception ==
On review aggregator website Rotten Tomatoes, the film has an approval rating of 92% based on 65 reviews, and an average rating of 7.5/10. The website's critical consensus reads, "A Prayer Before Dawn is far from an easy watch, but this harrowing prison odyssey delivers rich rewards — led by an outstanding central performance from Joe Cole." On Metacritic, the film has a weighted average score of 76 out of 100, based on 17 critics, indicating "generally favorable" reviews.
