= The Death of Francis Bacon =

2021 book by Max Porter

- Author: Max Porter
- Language: English
- Publisher: Faber and Faber
- Publication date: 7 January 2021
- Publication place: United Kingdom
- Pages: 74
- ISBN: 9780571366514
- Preceded by: Lanny
- Followed by: Shy

The Death of Francis Bacon is a novella by Max Porter about Francis Bacon, published in 2021. It is a reimagining of Bacon's deathbed thoughts, in his final six days in April 1992, in a Madrid hospital, alone except for a hospice nun.

The Death of Francis Bacon mixes prose and poetry experimentally. It is a "brief, fragmentary book [. . .] divided into seven chapters of no more than eight small pages." According to Liam Pieper writing in The Sydney Morning Herald, "at about 6000 words, it's something between a short story and a long, messy poem."
