= Shy (novella) =

2023 book by Max Porter

- Author: Max Porter
- Language: English
- Publisher: Faber and Faber
- Publication date: 2023
- Publication place: United Kingdom
- Pages: 128
- ISBN: 9780571377305
- Preceded by: The Death of Francis Bacon

Shy is a novella by Max Porter, published in 2023.

The book is named after its protagonist, a 16-year-old at a boarding school for troubled boys, in England in 1995. The story takes place over the course of a few hours one night. "The book's true setting, however, is the sprawling, shifting terrain of Shy's mind." According to Kevin Power, writing in The Guardian, "it is interested in questions of childhood and maturity, cruelty and compassion, art and despair". Shy mixes prose and poetry. Stylistically, there is unusual typography. Similar to Porter's other works, the writing itself is experimental, reflecting the subject's chaotic mind.

The book was adapted into the 2025 drama film Steve.
