= Mare's Nest =

2025 film by Ben Rivers

- Teaser poster
- Directed by: Ben Rivers
- Screenplay by: Ben Rivers
- Based on: The Word for Snow by Don DeLillo
- Produced by: Andrea Queralt; Ben Rivers
- Starring: Moon Guo Barker
- Cinematography: Ben Rivers; Carmen Pellon
- Edited by: Armiliah Aripin; Ben Rivers
- Production companies: Urth Films; 4A4 Productions; La Bête; Le Fresnoy; GreenGround Productions
- Release date: 9 August 2025 (Locarno)
- Running time: 98 minutes
- Countries: United Kingdom; France; Canada
- Languages: English; Catalan

Mare's Nest is a 2025 drama film written and directed by Ben Rivers. The film based on one act play The Word for Snow by Don DeLillo, combines elements of fiction, documentary, poetic essay, and fable, and tells the story of Moon, a young girl exploring a strange, adult-less world.

An international co-production between the United Kingdom, France and Canada, the film had its world premiere at the 78th Locarno Film Festival on 9 August 2025, where it won the Pardo Verde.

== Cast ==
- Moon Guo Barker as Moon
- Astrid Ihora as the Scholar

== Production ==
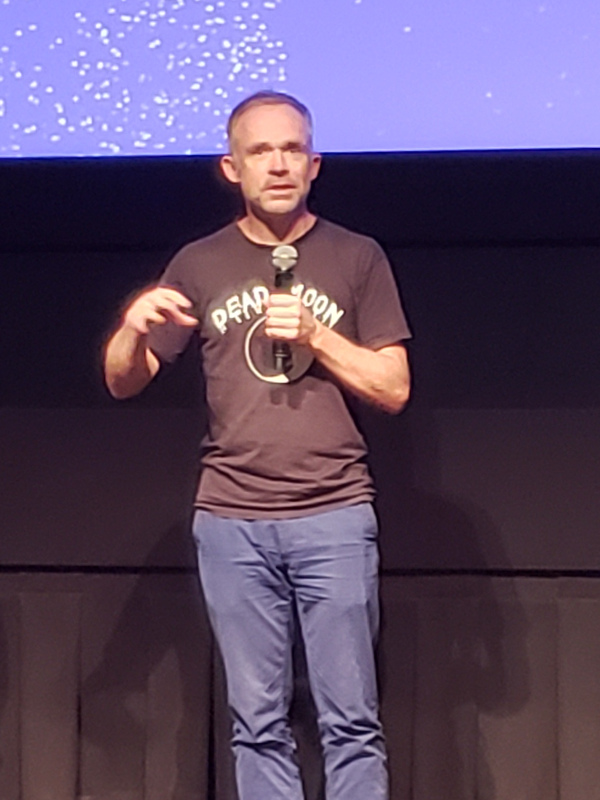
Ben Rivers the director of the film

The director Ben Rivers, developed the idea of the film from “a growing sense of dread” about the world future generations will inherit. It was initially inspired by the impact of COVID-19 on children, along with Don DeLillo’s climate-focused play The Word for Snow. He wrote the character of Moon specifically for Moon Guo Barker, who is playing the protagonist Moon, developing the narrative into a near-future road movie infused with "both unease and a sense of wonder". Going by the director's affinity for layered story-telling, the film features a film-within-the-film: his 2022 short The Minotaur, which is portrayed as a work made by the children in the story.

The film shot over three years across Menorca, Spain and the United Kingdom, is produced by Ben Rivers through United Kingdom based company Urth Films in collaboration with Queralt.

== Release ==
Mare's Nest had its World Premiere at the 78th Locarno Film Festival on 9 August 2025, and competed for Golden Leopard.

The film was screened in Wavelengths section of the 2025 Toronto International Film Festival on 10 September 2025 for its North American Premiere. It also made it to the Currents Selections of the 2025 New York Film Festival, where it had its United States Premiere on 2 October 2025. It will also be presented in 'Strands: Create' section of the 2025 BFI London Film Festival on 11 October 2025.

The film was screened in the Les nouveaux alchimistes for its Quebec Premiere at the 2025 Festival du nouveau cinéma on October 9, 2025, and in International Perspective at the São Paulo International Film Festival on 16 October 2025.

On 27 October 2025, the film was showcased at the 38th Tokyo International Film Festival in 'World Focus' section.

It was screened in Film Forward Special Screenings at the Thessaloniki International Film Festival on 1 November 2025. It will be presented in 'Experimental Films - 2025' section of the 56th International Film Festival of India in November 2025.

Beijing-based Rediance acquired the world sales rights to the film.

== Reception ==
Peter Bradshaw of The Guardian rated the film four stars out of five, and wrote, that the film evokes a dreamlike, strange atmosphere reminiscent of "Pasolini’s Greek dramas", with children delivering haunting, otherworldly dialogue. Bradshaw concluded the review that though the meaning of the film may be elusive, the director’s "enigmatic style" commands attention.

In his review at Locarno, Douglas Johnson of the International Cinephile Society rated the film with 3.5 stars out of 5 and wrote that Mare’s Nest opens in chaos and closes with Moon’s serene smile, amid there is the decay, art sparks moments of meaning, wonder, and intent."

== Accolades ==
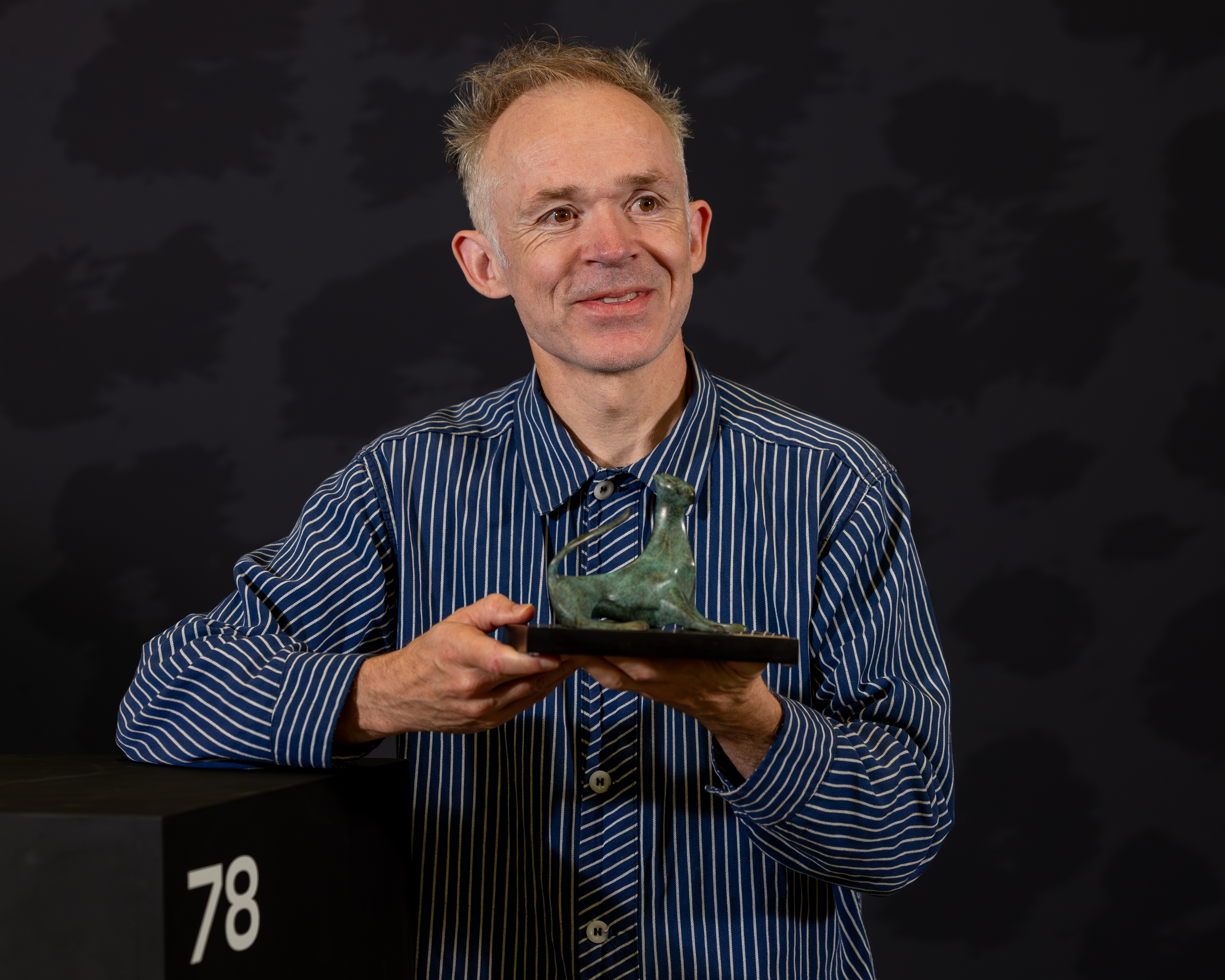
Ben Rivers at Locarno with Pardo Verde

Award	Ceremony date	Category	Recipient(s)	Result	Ref.
Locarno Film Festival	16 August 2025	Golden Leopard	Mare's Nest	Nominated	
Locarno Film Festival	16 August 2025	Pardo Verde	Mare's Nest	Won	
Festival du nouveau cinéma	19 October 2025	New Alchemists, Best Feature Film	Mare's Nest	Won	
