= The Thing with Feathers (film) =

British drama film

- Theatrical release poster
- Directed by: Dylan Southern
- Screenplay by: Dylan Southern
- Based on: Grief Is the Thing with Feathers by Max Porter
- Produced by: Leah Clarke; Andrea Cornwell; Adam Ackland
- Starring: Benedict Cumberbatch; Richard Boxall; Henry Boxall; Eric Lampaert; Vinette Robinson; Sam Spruell; Leo Bill; Tim Plester; David Thewlis
- Cinematography: Ben Fordesman
- Edited by: George Cragg
- Music by: Zebedee C. Budworth
- Production companies: Film4; BFI; Lobo Films; SunnyMarch
- Distributed by: Vue Lumière
- Release dates: 25 January 2025 (Sundance); 21 November 2025 (United Kingdom and Ireland)
- Running time: 104 minutes
- Country: United Kingdom
- Language: English
- Budget: $6 million
- Box office: $602,780

The Thing with Feathers is a 2025 British drama film starring Benedict Cumberbatch. It is written and directed by Dylan Southern and adapted from the book Grief Is the Thing with Feathers by Max Porter. It received mixed reviews from critics.

== Synopsis ==
Left to raise two young sons after the unexpected death of his wife, Dad's life begins to unravel. The grief was overwhelming and was already messing with his mind enough, but when it takes the form of a horrendous and unwanted house guest—Crow—taunting him from the shadows, things start to quickly get out of his control. but maybe that's potentially what he needed all this time.

== Cast ==
- Benedict Cumberbatch as Dad
- Richard Boxall as Boy 1
- Henry Boxall as Boy 2
- Eric Lampaert as Crow
- David Thewlis as the voice of Crow
- Vinette Robinson as Amanda
- Sam Spruell as Paul
- Leo Bill as Dr. Bowden
- Tim Plester as Andy
- Claire Cartwright as Mum

== Production ==
The project is from Film4, Lobo Films and Cumberbatch’s SunnyMarch. Producers on the project are Andrea Cornwell, Adam Ackland and Leah Clarke. It is an adaptation by Dylan Southern of the novel Grief Is the Thing with Feathers by Max Porter. The film received British Film Institute (BFI) Filmmaking Fund production support in 2024.

Principal photography began in early 2024.

== Release ==
It premiered at the 2025 Sundance Film Festival on 25 January 2025. It was also shown as European premiere at the 75th Berlin International Film Festival in 18 February 2025. In April 2025, Vue Lumière acquired U.K. and Irish distribution rights to the film. They released it across the UK and Ireland on 21 November 2025.

== Reception ==
=== Critical response ===
On the review aggregator website Rotten Tomatoes, 47% of 73 critics' reviews are positive, with an average rating of 5.4/10. The website's consensus reads: "The Thing with Feathers manages to take flight thanks in part to Benedict Cumberbatch, but choppy characterizations and lack of subtlety make for a rough ride." Metacritic, which uses a weighted average, assigned the film a score of 48 out of 100, based on 18 critics, indicating "mixed or average" reviews.

=== Accolades ===
Date	Award / Festival	Category	Recipient(s)	Result	Ref.
29 September 2025	Zurich Film Festival	Golden Eye Award	Benedict Cumberbatch	Won	
19 October 2025	Sitges Film Festival	Best Feature Film	The Thing with Feathers	Nominated	
2025	British Independent Film Awards	Best Effects	Hayley Williams, Conor O’Sullivan, Martin Malmqvist	Nominated	
