= Hunters in the Dark =

2015 book by Lawrence Osborne

First edition (publ. Hogarth Press)

Hunters in the Dark is a 2015 psychological thriller written by Lawrence Osborne and set in Cambodia. Lee Child wrote in the New York Times Book Review that, "If the purpose of a novel is to take you away from the everyday and show you something different, then Osborne is succeeding, and handsomely. “Hunters in the Dark” is a novel of immersion, not suspense, shaped like a quiet dream. The reader can do nothing but float as if in a muddy river, going where it takes him, which will be back to a version of the beginning."

The novel was widely and positively reviewed on both sides of the Atlantic. Neal Mukherjee wrote in The Guardian : "With the first two of his three elegant, stylish and ambiguous novels – The Forgiven in 2012, The Ballad of a Small Player last year, and now Hunters in the Dark – Lawrence Osborne elicited comparisons to Graham Greene, Evelyn Waugh, James Salter, Paul Bowles, among others. He seems to be a revenant from a species that has, paradoxically, become almost extinct following the triumph of globalisation: the traveller (or travel-writer)-novelist...Written with unfailing precision and beauty, "Hunters in the Dark" stakes out territory different from the many writers to whom Osborne has been compared." Arifa Akbar, then literary editor of The Independent, chose it as one of her Books of the Year for 2015. In the Evening Standard, British critic David Sexton wrote : "Hunters in the Dark" is itself pitilessly good. Those comparisons with Graham Greene aren’t even flattering any more."

A film adaptation of the novel is currently in development
