= Angus Wright =

Angus Wright may refer to:

- Angus Wright (academic) (1945–2022), environmental studies professor at California State University, Sacramento
- Angus Wright (actor) (born 1964), British actor
- Angus Wright (producer) (1934–2012), British television producer
