= Grief Is the Thing with Feathers =

2015 book by Max Porter

- Author: Max Porter
- Language: English
- Publisher: Faber and Faber
- Publication date: 2015
- Publication place: United Kingdom
- Awards: Dylan Thomas Prize
- ISBN: 9780571323760
- Followed by: Lanny

Grief Is the Thing with Feathers is the debut book by Max Porter, a novella about grief, published in 2015.

== Details ==
Grief Is the Thing with Feathers is a "book about death and its grief-stricken consolations – love and art" through the story "of a grieving writer and father of two young boys, who is coming to terms with the death of his wife while writing a book about Ted Hughes". It uses text, dialogue and poetry. The book is narrated from rapidly alternating perspectives: the Dad, the Boys, and Crow—a human-sized bird that can speak, "equal parts babysitter, philosopher and therapist" to the family.

The title refers to a poem by Emily Dickinson, "'Hope' is the thing with feathers". Crow is the Crow from Ted Hughes' 1970 poetry book.

== Awards ==
Year	Award	Category	Result	Ref.
2015	Goldsmiths Prize	—	Shortlisted	
2015	Guardian First Book Award	—	Shortlisted	
2016	Books Are My Bag Readers' Award	Fiction	Won	
2016	Dylan Thomas Prize	—	Won	
2016	Sunday Times Young Writer of the Year Award	—	Won	
2017	Europese Literatuurprijs	—	Won	

== Adaptations ==
Grief Is the Thing with Feathers was adapted into a play of the same name, directed by Enda Walsh and starring Cillian Murphy.

A film adaptation starring Benedict Cumberbatch, titled The Thing with Feathers premiered at the 2025 Sundance Film Festival on 25 January 2025.
