= Eternal Return (film) =

2025 film by Yaniv Raz

- Directed by: Yaniv Raz
- Written by: Yaniv Raz
- Produced by: Margot Hand; Jillian Apfelbaum; Tristen Tuckfield; James F. Lopez; Greta Talia Fuentes; Bill Kenwright; Nic Gordon; Naomi Scott; Jordan Spence; Yaniv Raz
- Starring: Naomi Scott; Kit Harington; Simon Callow; Sonoya Mizuno; Jay Lycurgo
- Cinematography: Pierluigi Gigi Malavasi
- Edited by: Mark Everson; Heather Persons
- Music by: Chanda Dancy
- Production companies: Village Roadshow Pictures (uncredited); MACRO; BK Studios; Picture Films; New Name Entertainment; Gatherer Entertainment
- Distributed by: Quiver Distribution (United States)
- Release dates: September 8, 2025 (TIFF); December 4, 2026 (United States)
- Running time: 115 minutes
- Countries: United Kingdom; United States
- Language: English

Eternal Return is a 2025 British-American epic romance film written and directed by Yaniv Raz. It stars Naomi Scott and Kit Harington.

The film premiered at the 2025 Toronto International Film Festival on September 8, 2025, and is also set to be released on December 4, 2026.

== Premise ==
A woman is sent back in time to reignite her ability to love.

== Cast ==
- Naomi Scott as Cass Pfeffer
- Kit Harington as Virgil Jaymes
- Simon Callow as Malcolm
- Sonoya Mizuno
- Jay Lycurgo

== Production ==
It was announced in May 2023 that Naomi Scott, Kit Harington and Jeremy Irons were cast to star in the film, with Scott also serving as a producer. Yaniv Raz will write and direct. By December 2023, filming on the project had ended, with shoots having taken place in London, Cardiff and Bristol and Simon Callow having replaced Irons at some point during production.

== Release ==
Eternal Return premiered at the Toronto International Film Festival on September 8, 2025. The film is scheduled to be released on December 4, 2026 by Quiver Distribution.
