= Helen Walsh =

English novelist and film director

- Born: 1976 (age 49–50); Warrington, Cheshire
- Occupations: Screenwriter, film director, author
- Known for: Brass, The Gathering

Helen Walsh (born 1976) is an English novelist, screenwriter and film director. Her novels include Brass, which won a Betty Trask Award, and Once Upon a Time in England, which won a Somerset Maugham Award.

== Early life ==
Walsh was born in Warrington, Cheshire, in 1976. At the age of 16, she moved to Barcelona, Spain but returned to England in her early twenties.

== Career ==
Her first novel, Brass, was published in 2004 and won a Betty Trask Award. Her second novel, Once Upon a Time In England, was published in 2008 and won a 2009 Somerset Maugham Award and was shortlisted for the 2008 Portico Prize. Her third novel, Go to Sleep was published in 2011. All three were published by Canongate Press.

Walsh's most recent novel, The Lemon Grove, was published in 2014 by Tinder Press. It concerns the illicit relationship between a woman and her stepdaughter's 17-year-old boyfriend on holiday in Mallorca.

Walsh has also worked in film and television. Her feature directorial debut, The Violators, was released in 2016. In 2024, Channel 4 broadcast her television thriller The Gathering. In 2025, her second feature, On the Sea, was released.
