= The Ballad of a Small Player =

Novel by Lawrence Osborne

The Ballad of a Small Player: A Novel
- First UK edition
- Author: Lawrence Osborne
- Language: English
- Genre: Thriller
- Publisher: Hogarth Press
- Publication date: 1 April 2014
- Publication place: United Kingdom
- Media type: Print, e-book, audiobook
- Pages: 275 pp.
- ISBN: 978-0804137980

The Ballad of a Small Player is a 2014 novel by British writer Lawrence Osborne. Set in the gambling casinos of Macau, it follows the fortunes of an English con man who passes himself off as a runaway person of nobility. Part ghost story, part psychological thriller, it earned Osborne comparisons with Graham Greene and Dostoevsky.

== Reception ==
The novel was selected for numerous year's best novel lists, including the 100 Notable Books of 2014 in The New York Times, by Neel Mukherjee in the New Statesman, and by Ian Crouch in The New Yorker.

It was admiringly reviewed by Tom Shone in The New York Times. China scholar Paul French in the Los Angeles Review of Books wrote: "I'll come right out and say it... Osborne's novel is the best on contemporary China since Malraux's."

== Film adaptation ==
A 2025 film adaptation for Netflix was produced, directed by Edward Berger (All Quiet on the Western Front and Conclave) and starring Colin Farrell and Tilda Swinton. Shooting began on June 27, 2024, in Macau and Hong Kong. Netflix released the film on October 16, 2025 after premieres at the Toronto Film Festival, Telluride and the Zurich Film Festival.
