= Thai Enquirer =

English daily newspaper in Bangkok, Thailand

- Website type: News website
- Available in: English
- Founded: 15 January 2020
- Website: www.thaienquirer.com

Thai Enquirer is an English-language news website based in Bangkok, Thailand.

== Description ==
Thai Enquirer is an independent online media publication intended to "provide a mixture of in-depth reporting, political and cultural commentary, as well as highlights of fiction, prose, poetry, and humour." The website is focused on political and social issues in Thailand, but has also covered issues "in the broader region and the wider world, where we feel it necessary, prudent, or when a story demands telling."

Named as one of the publications representing the future of Thai media, the Thai Enquirer first rose to prominence in late 2020 for its coverage of the pro-democracy protests in Thailand. The website went viral in June 2020 for its satirical coverage of the Black Lives Matter protests in the US with an article that was shared over 60,000 times. It also drew attention for its mockery of Donald Trump's mispronunciation of Thailand, renaming itself as the "Thigh Enquirer" for a day.

As of December 2022, it has an online following of over 50,000 followers on Facebook and almost 90,000 followers on Twitter.

== Editorial stance ==
The editorial board has been known to be highly critical of the current government led by Prime Minister Prayut Chan-o-cha as well as the military junta that took power between 2014 and 2019.

== Sections ==
The Thai Enquirer website has four main sections.

- Market Watch: Features on business and financial news, as well as the stock market.
- Current Affairs: Local and regional news, political and social analyses, and news summaries.
- Opinion: Commentary by editorial staff and contributing writers.
- The Culture Blog: Features on popular culture, celebrities, reviews, poetry, and satirical pieces.

There has also been a special section titled COVID-19 for specific pandemic-related news and statistics.
