= Lanny (novel) =

2019 book by Max Porter

- Author: Max Porter
- Language: English
- Publisher: Faber and Faber
- Publication date: 7 March 2019
- Publication place: United Kingdom
- ISBN: 9780571340286

Lanny is the second novel by Max Porter, published in March 2019. It is a missing-boy story, set in an English village within commuting distance of London. The book was described by Tim Smith-Laing in The Telegraph as being "between novella, long poem, and grief memoir", and by John Boyne in The Irish Times as "experimental fiction". It is named after the missing boy.

Lanny is set to be adapted into a film, produced by The Bureau and BBC Film, starring Rachel Weisz.

In 2026, Bristol Old Vic Theatre announced that they are producing a stage adaption of the novel, to be adapted by Bea Roberts and directed by Nancy Medina.

== Awards ==
Year	Award	Category	Result	Ref.
2019	Books Are My Bag Readers' Awards	Fiction	Shortlisted	
2019	Foyles Book of the Year	Fiction	Shortlisted	
2019	Goodreads Choice Awards	Fiction	Nominated	
2019	Gordon Burn Prize	—	Shortlisted	
2019	Man Booker Prize	—	Longlisted	
2019	Wainwright Prize	—	Longlisted	
2019	Waterstones Book of the Year	—	Shortlisted	
2020	Andrew Carnegie Medals for Excellence	Fiction	Longlisted	
2020	BookTube Prize	Fiction	Shortlisted	
