= Lawrence Osborne =

British author (born 1958)

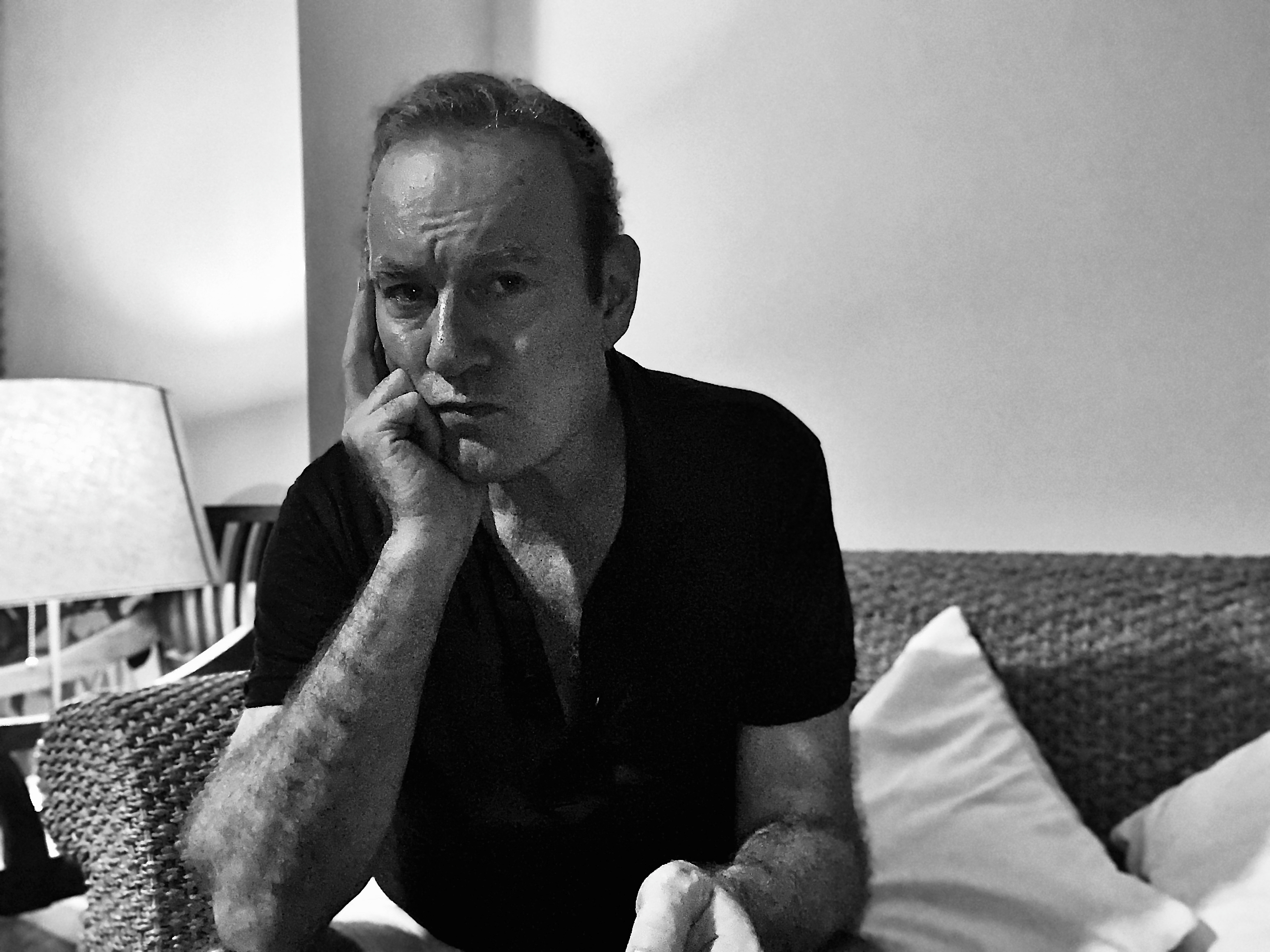
- Born: 1958 (age 67–68); London, England
- Education: Fitzwilliam College, Cambridge; Harvard University
- Writing career
- Notable awards: Edgar Award nomination Best Novel (2019); Best American Short Stories (2012); The New York Times Notable Book (2018)

Lawrence Osborne (born 1958) is a British novelist, short story writer and screenwriter. Osborne was educated at Cambridge, where he studied medieval Italian, and at Harvard University. He has since led a nomadic life, residing for years in Paris, Italy, Morocco, the United States, Mexico, Thailand, and Istanbul.

Osborne has been published widely as a long-form journalist in the United States, most notably in The New York Times Magazine, The New Yorker, Gourmet, Salon, Playboy, and Condé Nast Traveler. His writings about wine and spirits appeared in a regular column called Cellar in Men's Vogue. He is also a regular contributor to the London Spectator where his short story Demonia appeared in the 2024 Christmas edition. The Wet and the Dry, a travelogue about Islam and alcohol was published in 2013 and was included in the Top 10 Books of 2013 by The New York Times Book Review critic, Dwight Garner.

His short stories have appeared in many American magazines. His story "Volcano", originally published in Tin House, was selected for inclusion in The Best American Short Stories 2012. Most recently the Tokyo-set "Hotel" was published in 2026 in London Magazine. Osborne's stories were published by Chatto and Windus in London as the collection "Burning Angel" in 2023.

As of 2025 Osborne is a co-founder of the London based film production company Java Road.

== Reception ==
Osborne is the author of eight novels, beginning with "The Forgiven" in 2012. Based originally on his reports of the Moroccan fossil industry for the New York Times it received widespread acclaim on both sides of the Atlantic and was selected by the New York Times and The Economist as one of the Best Books of the Year for 2012. In the London Sunday Times, Robert Collins wrote: "A modern Graham Greene ... into this relatively quiet period for British fiction, someone remarkable and unexpected has emerged fully armed with a formidable, masterly grip on the British novel. At precisely the point where most novelists start to show signs of flagging, Osborne has hit his creative, fictional stride ... and has arrived as a thrilling, exceptional talent in British fiction's landscape." "The Forgiven" was made into a feature film in 2021 by John Michael McDonagh and starring Ralph Fiennes, Jessica Chastain and Matt Smith. The film premiered at the Toronto Film Festival Festival and then at the Tribeca Film Festival.

His second novel, The Ballad of a Small Player, was published by Hogarth in spring 2014. The New York Times selected it as one of its 100 Notable Books of 2014. NPR also included it in its Year's Best Books of 2014. Paul French in the Los Angeles Review of Books wrote that "Osborne's novel is the best on contemporary China since Malraux's." Neel Mukherjee picked it as one of his Books of the Year in The New Statesman.

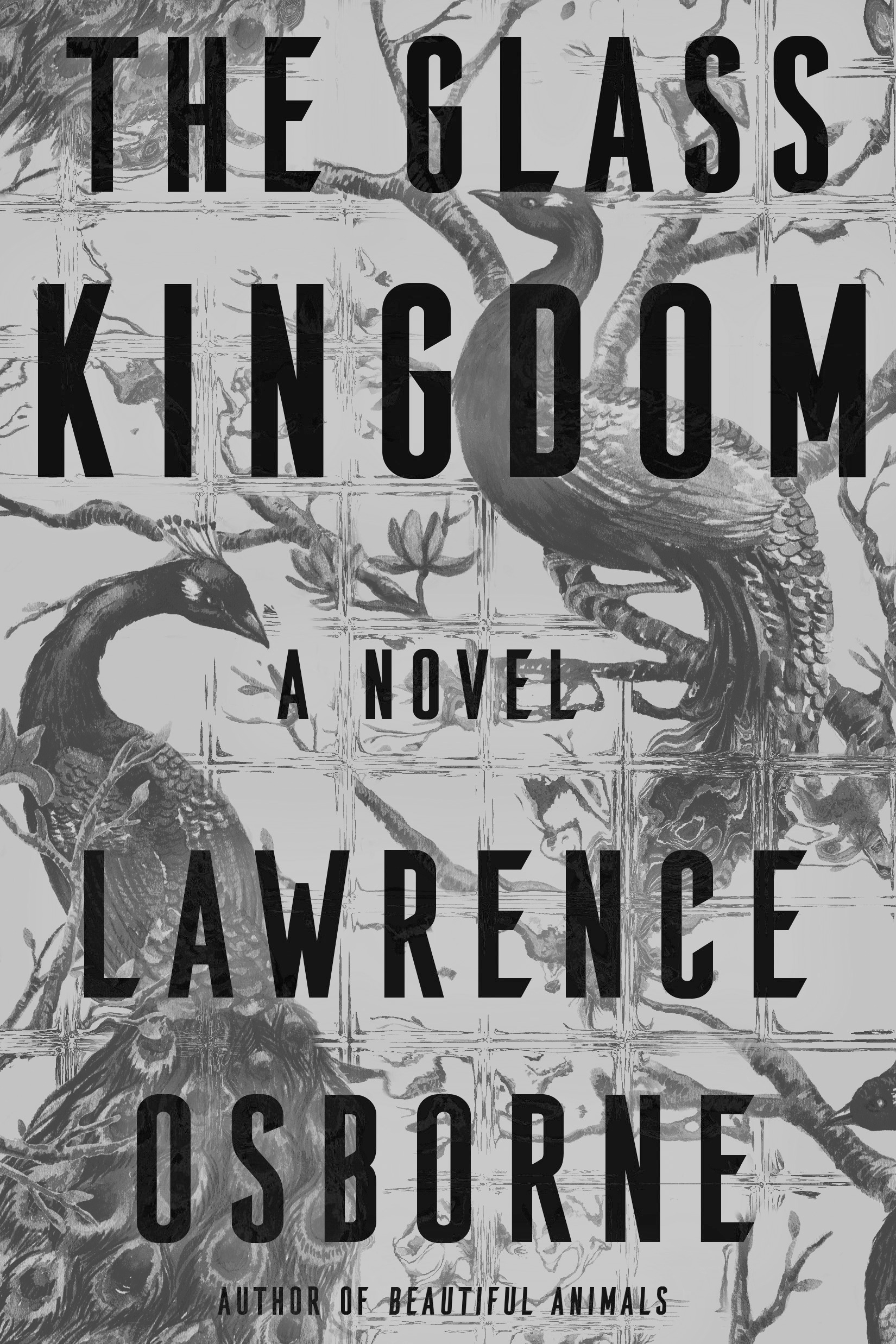

His third novel, Hunters in the Dark, was published by Hogarth in May 2015 and received glowing reviews. Arifa Akbar, literary editor of The Independent in London, selected it as one of her 15 Best Novels of 2015, and the novel was notably praised by Neel Mukerjee in The Guardian and by Lee Child in The New York Times Book Review. Nishant Dahiya reviewed it for NPR. British critic David Sexton wrote in the Evening Standard: "Those comparisons with Graham Greene aren't even flattering any more." Anita Sethi reviewed it in The Guardian with praise for its stylistic finesse.

Beautiful Animals was published by Hogarth in July 2017 and was featured on the cover of The New York Times Book Review with a review by the Japanese-American novelist Katie Kitamura. In her long review of the novel in The Washington Post, Lionel Shriver wrote: "So let's not mince words. This is a great book." A film adaptation is currently in development.

Osborne was asked by the Raymond Chandler estate to write the next Philip Marlowe novel, released in 2018. Widely and favourably reviewed, Only to Sleep was selected by philosopher John Gray as his Book of the Year in the New Statesman, and was included in The New York Times 100 Most Notable Books of 2018 and NPR's Best Books of 2018. It was selected by William Boyd in the same category in The Guardian.

The Glass Kingdom was published in 2020 and was included in the New York Times Notable 100 Books of 2020. It was also reviewed at length in a profile of the author by John Gray in The New Statesman.

A novel On Java Road, set in Hong Kong, appeared with Random House in August 2022 to enthusiastic reviews. It was named as a recommended book by Molly Young in the New York Times. Burning Angel appeared a year later in 2023 and was selected as a New Statesman "Book of the Year 2023."

"Children of Wolves" was published in August 2026 and was reviewed favorably by many publications including the Wall Street Journal ("Flawless..chilling ) , The Times Literary Supplement, the London Times, the New Statesman, Crimereads and Kirkus ( starred review ).

== Films ==
As reported by The Hollywood Reporter, Osborne sat on the jury of the 2017 Macau Film Festival.

For "The Forgiven" see above.

Set in Macau, Ballad of a Small Player was shot in summer 2024 in both Macau and Hong Kong. Directed by Edward Berger, starring Colin Farrell, Tilda Swinton and Fala Chen, the film was released by Netflix in 2025.

"Beautiful Animals," "Hunters in the Dark" and "Children of Wolves" are all currently in development.

In June 2020 it was announced by both Variety and The Hollywood Reporter that Osborne will script and co-produce the film adaptation of Jon Swain's 1997 Vietnam war memoir River of Time in conjunction with Indochina Productions. His scripts "Solstice" and "Burning Angel" currently in development, to be shot in Mongolia and New York.

In May 2025, Deadline announced the creation of JAVA ROAD, a production company formed by Osborne, producers Mike Goodridge of Good Chaos and Nicholas Simon of Indochina Productions (based in London and Asia).

== Bibliography ==
=== Non-fiction ===
- American Normal (2002)
- The Accidental Connoisseur (2004)
- The Naked Tourist (2006)
- Bangkok Days (2009)
- The Wet and the Dry (2013)

=== Fiction ===
- Ania Malina (1989)
- The Forgiven (2012)
- The Ballad of a Small Player (2014)
- Hunters in the Dark (2015)
- Beautiful Animals (2017)
- Only to Sleep (2018), a Philip Marlowe novel
- The Glass Kingdom (2020)
- On Java Road (2022)
- Burning Angel and Other Stories (2023)
- Children of Wolves (2026)
