= Ben Rivers =

Artist and experimental filmmaker

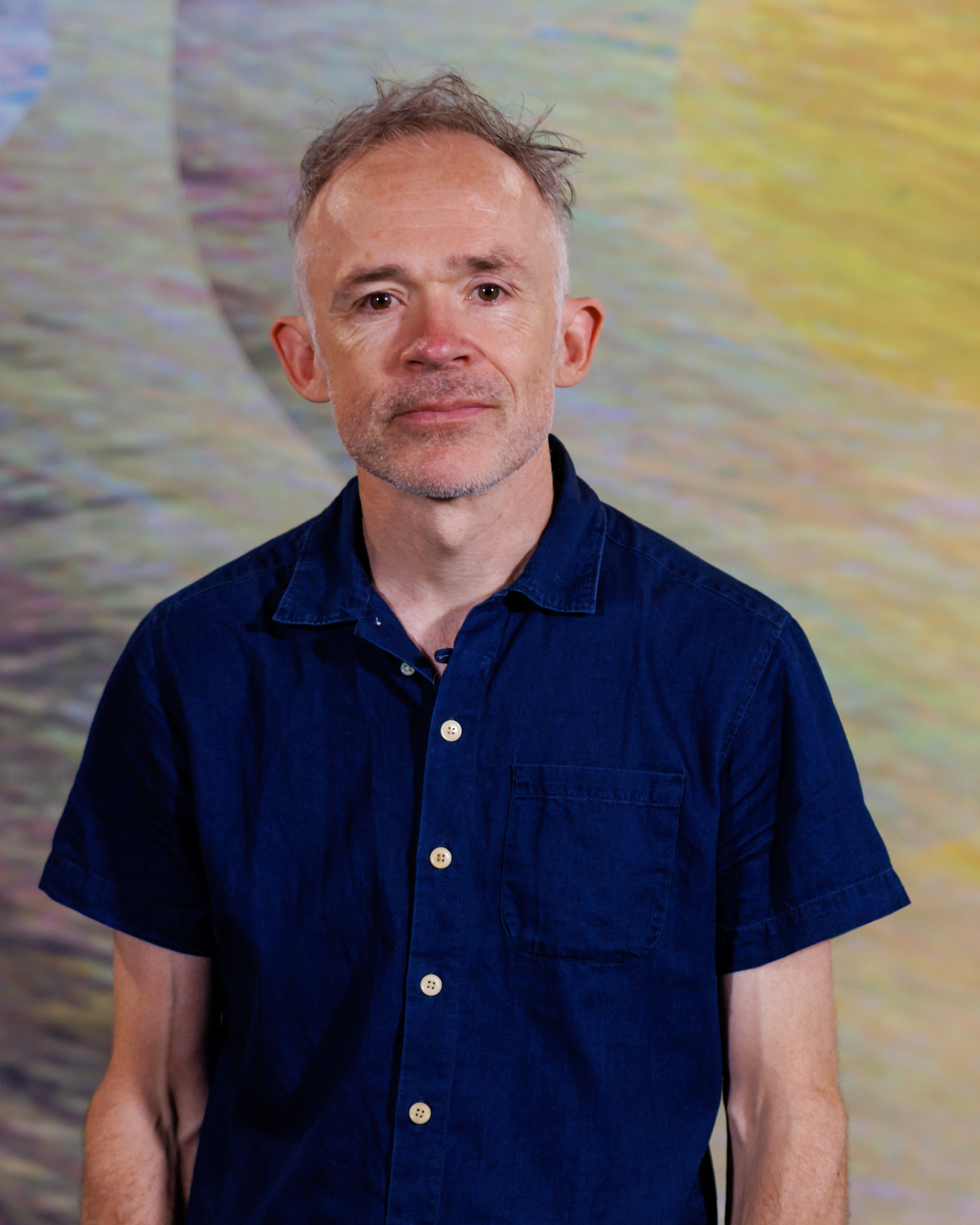
- Born: 1972 (age 53–54)
- Occupations: Artist, experimental filmmaker
- Website: benrivers.com

Ben Rivers (born 1972) is an artist and experimental filmmaker based in London, England. His work has been screened at film festivals and galleries around the world and have won numerous awards. Rivers' work ranges in themes, including exploring unknown wilderness territories to candid and intimate portraits of real-life subjects.

== Life and career ==
Ben Rivers studied fine art at Falmouth University. His practice as a filmmaker treads a line between documentary and fiction. Often following and filming people who have in some way separated themselves from society, the raw film footage provides Rivers with a starting point for creating oblique narratives imagining alternative existences in marginal worlds. Rivers often employs analogue media and hand develops 16mm film, which shows the evidence of the elements it has been exposed to – the materiality of this medium forming part of the narrative.

Rivers's first feature-length film, Two Years at Sea, was presented in September 2011 in the Orizzonti section at the 68th Venice International Film Festival and won the FIPRESCI International Critics prize. His second feature, A Spell to Ward Off the Darkness, was made in collaboration with American filmmaker Ben Russell, a frequent collaborator, and premiered at Locarno Film Festival 2013. His feature film directed in collaboration with Thai filmmaker Anocha Suwichakornpong Krabi, 2562 (2019) premiered at Locarno Film Festival that same year. Rivers was awarded the Pardo Verde for his feature film Mare's Nest (2025) at the 78th Locarno Film Festival.

Rivers is represented by Kate MacGarry Gallery, London. He is a Media City Film Festival Chrysalis Fellowship recipient (2020), after screening his work at the festival since the early aughts. His feature films are distributed in the United Kingdom by SODA Pictures, Cinema Guild and KimStim in North America.

== Shows ==
- "Nought to Sixty" ICA, London, 2008.
- "Wild Shapes" – group show, Cell Project Space, London, 2008.
- "A World Rattled of Habit" – solo show, A Foundation, Liverpool, 2009.
- "Slow Action" – solo show, Gallery TPW, Toronto 2011 and Matt's Gallery, London 2011.
- "Heather and Ivan Morison, Ben Rivers and David Thorpe" – Hepworth Wakefield 2012.
- "Ah, Liberty!" – solo show, Douglas Hyde Gallery, Dublin 2013.
- "Fable" – solo show, Temporary Gallery, Cologne 2014.
- "Things" – solo show, Kate MacGarry Gallery, London 2014.

Artist-in-focus screenings and retrospectives include Courtisane Festival; Pesaro International Film Festival; London Film Festival; Tirana Film Festival; Punto de Vista Pamplona; and Karlovy Vary International Film Festival

== Filmography ==
- Old Dark House (2003)
- We the People (2004)
- The Hyrcynium Wood (2005)
- The Bomb with a Man in his Shoe (2005)
- This Is My Land (2006)
- Astika (2006)
- The Coming Race (2006)
- Terror! (2006)
- Greenhouse (2007)
- Dove Coup (2007)
- House (2007)
- Ah, Liberty! (2008)
- Sørdal (2008)
- Origin of the Species (2008)
- A World Rattled of Habit (2008)
- May Tomorrow Shine The Brightest of All Your Many Days As It Will Be Your Last (2009)
- I Know Where I'm Going (2009)
- Slow Action (2010)
- Two Years at Sea (2011)
- Sack Barrow (2011)
- The Creation As We Saw It (2012)
- Phantoms of a Libertine (2012)
- A Spell to Ward Off the Darkness (2013) (co-directed with Ben Russell)
- Things (2014)
- The Film That Buys the Cinema (2014)
- The Sky Trembles and the Earth Is Afraid and the Two Eyes Are Not Brothers (2015)
- What Means Something (2015)
- A Distant Episode (2016)
- There Is a Happy Land Further Awaay (2016)
- The Hunchback (2016) (co-directed with Gabriel Abrantes)
- Trees Down There (2018)
- The Rare Event (2018)
- The Ambassadors (2018) (co-directed with Anocha Suwichakornpong)
- Now, At Last! (2018)
- Krabi, 2562 (2019) (co-directed with Anocha Suwichakornpong)
- Ghost Strata (2019)
- Look Then Below (2020)
- Bogancloch (2024)
- Mare's Nest (2025)

== Awards and commissions ==
- 2007: London Artists' Film and Video Award (LAFVA).
- 2008: Tiger Award for Short Film, International Film Festival Rotterdam, for Ah, Liberty!.
- 2008: Vauxhall Collective Commission for I Know Where I'm Going.
- 2009: Selected for the first round of Film London's FLAMIN Productions programme.
- 2010: Shortlisted for the Film London Jarman Award.
- 2010: Paul Hamlyn Foundation Award for Artists.
- 2011: Baloise Art Prize, Art Basel, for Sack Barrow.
- 2011: FIPRESCI Prize, 68th Venice International Film Festival, for Two Years at Sea.
- 2012: Shortlisted for the Film London Jarman Award.
- 2013: Robert Gardner Film Award.
- 2013: Selected for the Artangel and BBC Radio 4 Open call.
- 2015: Tiger Award for Short Film, International Film Festival Rotterdam, for Things.
- 2016: Eye Art & Film Prize, Eye Filmmuseum.
- 2020: Media City Film Festival Chrysalis Fellow.
- 2025: Pardo Verde, Locarno Film Festival, for Mare's Nest.
