= Jay Lycurgo =

British actor

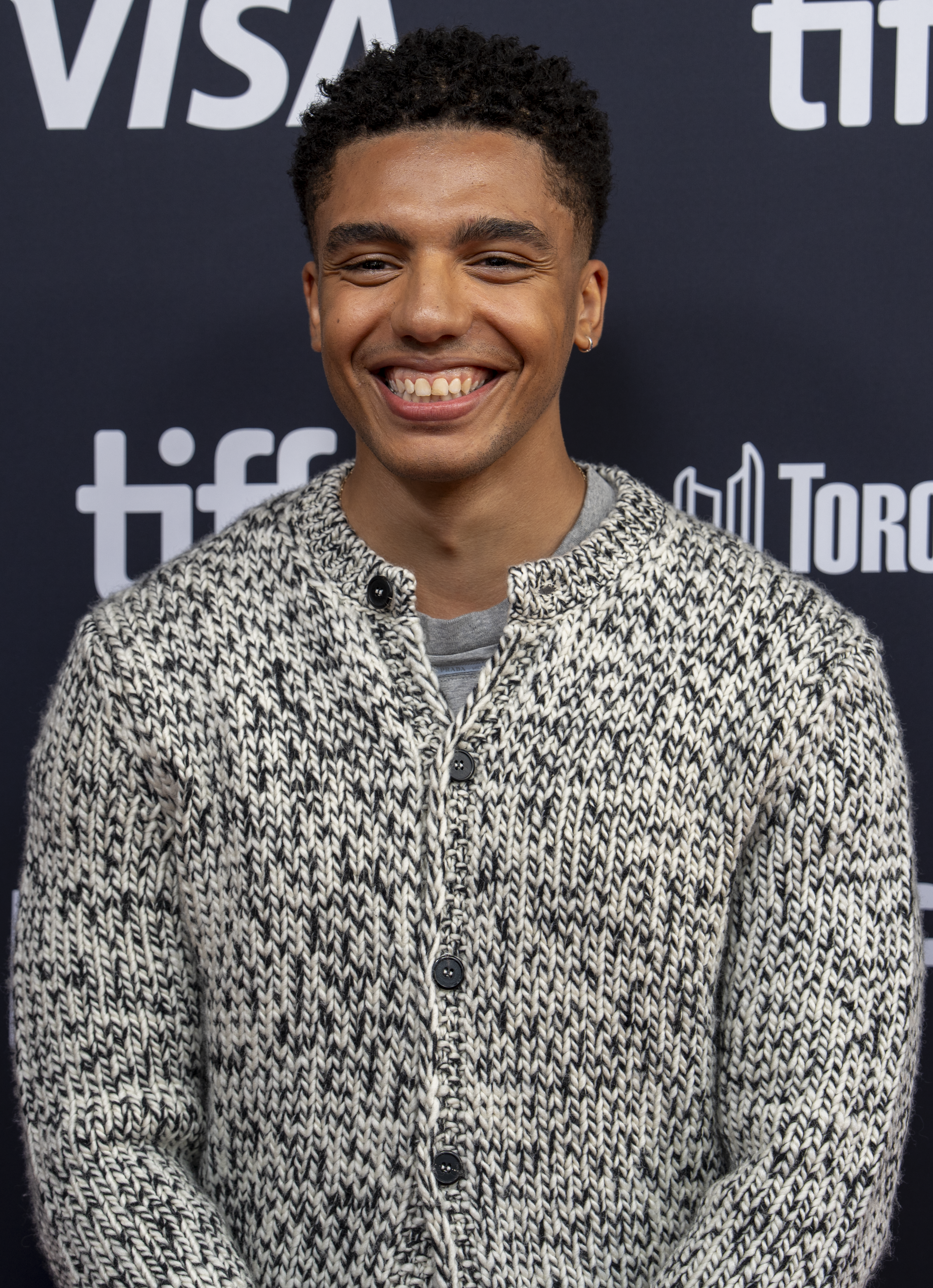
- Lycurgo at the 2025 Toronto International Film Festival
- Born: 6 February 1998 (age 28)
- Education: ArtsEd
- Years active: 2019–present

Jay Lycurgo (born 6 February 1998) is an English actor. On television, he is known for his roles in the DC Universe series Titans as Tim Drake (2021–2023) and the Netflix series The Bastard Son & The Devil Himself (2022). For his performance in the film Steve (2025), he won a British Independent Film Award.

== Early life ==
Lycurgo grew up in Croydon, the youngest of four children. He is of Jamaican, Sierra Leonean, and British heritage. His father is former professional footballer David Johnson. Lycurgo was partly inspired to act through watching productions at the local Fairfield Halls. After not getting into the BRIT School, his teacher suggested drama school. He went on to graduate with a Bachelor of Arts in Acting from Arts Educational School (ArtsEd) in 2019.

== Career ==
Upon graduating from ArtsEd, Lycurgo made his television debut in an episode of the BBC One medical drama Doctors as well as his professional stage debut as David Beckoff in the 2019 Turbine Theatre production of the Torch Song Trilogy. This was followed by appearances in the miniseries I May Destroy You, Jimmy McGovern's television film Anthony, and the science fiction series War of the Worlds. He had small roles in films Listen and The Batman.

In 2021, Lycurgo began playing Tim Drake, a recurring role in the third season of the DC Universe series Titans. Lycurgo has stated he was proud to play a superhero of mixed race as there were not many examples of this when he was growing up. He reprised his role as a regular in season 4. The following year, he played Paul in the BBC Three sitcom Cheaters.

Also in 2022, Lycurgo starred as Nathan Byrne in the Netflix series The Bastard Son & The Devil Himself, an adaptation of the young adult fantasy novel Half Bad by Sally Green. Auditioning was completed during the COVID-19 pandemic over video while he was in Toronto. He has stated he related to the cheekiness and quick witted nature of his character Nathan. He had to physically prepare for the action and fighting scenes in the series, which he has described as "Misfits meets This is England", "Twilight meets Skins", and as an "X-rated Harry Potter". He said he got into the headspace of playing a teenager despite being 24 years-old himself because "I feel like I'm just very childlike still, you know. I have a huge imagination…I think it's a real shame that as we get older we feel like we have to stop being that kid in a playground. You know? I don't think that needs to be the case. I feel like we should be able to still imagine things and be playful and creative. When you're acting it's just that sometimes you have to get the permission from the right people to be like, "No really go for it! Go there.” And then to yourself you just have to really believe that you're in these places. When it comes to being a teenager again, I think I'm just quite fortunate to still be very immature.” As well as the playfulness and immaturity in the character, Lycurgo told Newsweek how his characterization of Nathan was driven by an inherent loneliness saying "He is just a really lonely and isolated, quiet person, because he's always been in fight-and-flight [mode] and he doesn't trust anyone."

In 2023, he started filming Ben Wheatley comedy-horror series Generation Z. In 2024, he was cast in the Peaky Blinders film The Immortal Man alongside Cillian Murphy, with whom he was also cast in the film Steve. For the role, he was nominated for best supporting performance at the British Independent Film Awards 2025.

== Filmography ==
Key
| † | Denotes works that have not yet been released |

=== Film ===
| Year | Title | Role | Notes |
|---|---|---|---|
| 2019 | Man Down | Dayton | Short film |
| 2020 | Father of the Bride | Christian | Short film |
| 2020 | Listen | Young Man | |
| 2020 | Brothers | Jase | Short film |
| 2022 | The Batman | Train Gang Young Member | |
| 2024 | The Radleys | Evan Copleigh | |
| 2025 | Steve | Shy | |
| 2025 | Eternal Return | Julian | |
| 2026 | Peaky Blinders: The Immortal Man | Elijah | |
| 2026 | I See Buildings Fall Like Lightning | Oli | |

=== Television ===
| Year | Title | Role | Notes |
|---|---|---|---|
| 2019 | Doctors | Kyle O'Keefe | Episode: "Last Stop" |
| 2020 | I May Destroy You | Marcus | Episode: "The Alliance" |
| 2020 | Anthony | Marcus | Television film |
| 2021 | War of the Worlds | Will | 1 episode |
| 2021–2023 | Titans | Tim Drake / Robin | Main role (season 4) Recurring role (season 3) |
| 2022 | Cheaters | Paul | 7 episodes |
| 2022 | The Bastard Son & The Devil Himself | Nathan Byrne | Main role |
| 2024 | Generation Z | Charlie | |

== Stage ==
| Year | Title | Role | Notes |
|---|---|---|---|
| 2019 | Torch Song Trilogy | David Beckoff | Turbine Theatre, London |

== Awards and nominations ==
| Year | Association | Category | Title | Result | Ref |
|---|---|---|---|---|---|
| 2025 | British Independent Film Awards | Best Supporting Performance | Steve | Won | |
