= Chicken (2015 film) =

2015 film directed by Joe Stephenson

- Official poster
- Directed by: Joe Stephenson
- Written by: Chris New
- Based on: Chicken by Freddie Machin
- Produced by: Joe Stephenson; Tina Galovic
- Starring: Scott Chambers; Morgan Watkins; Yasmin Paige
- Cinematography: Eben Bolter
- Edited by: Joe Stephenson; Charlie Lyne
- Music by: Tom Linden
- Production company: B Good Picture Company
- Release dates: 27 June 2015 (Edinburgh); 20 May 2016
- Running time: 86 minutes
- Country: United Kingdom
- Language: English

Chicken is a 2015 British drama film directed by Joe Stephenson. It is based on the play of the same name by Freddie Machin.

== Plot ==
The film follows Richard, a 15-year-old boy with learning difficulties who lives in a shabby caravan with his older brother, Polly. Life for the siblings is harsh, with the engaging, nature-loving teenager yearning for stability. Richard frequently finds himself on the wrong side of Polly's destructive, often violent moods.

Richard finds it easier to communicate with animals – none more so than his beloved hen, Fiona. He forms a strong friendship with rebellious 17-year-old Annabel, whose family have recently acquired the farmland on which the brothers live. A growing conflict with the new landowners will lead to a situation that severely tests Richard's natural optimism, as the world of privilege collides with the brothers' precarious, marginalised existence.

== Cast ==
- Scott Chambers as Richard
- Morgan Watkins as Polly
- Yasmin Paige as Annabell
- Kirsty Besterman as Mrs Rickson
- Stuart Keil as Mr Rickson
- Freddie Machin as Scrap Yard Owner
- Gina Bramhill as Tara
- Alf Raines as Pub Landlord
- Johnny Vercoutre as Pub Customer
- Adrian Bouchet as Bill
- Rose Williams as Lil
- Ben Mars as Kevin
- Michael Culkin as McClint
- Danny Steele as Electrician
- Alex Murphy as Bloodied Man

== Release ==
Chicken had its world premiere on 27 June 2015 Edinburgh International Film Festival. The film had its international premiere in competition at the 2015 Busan International Film Festival, followed by screenings at the New Hampshire International Film Festival, Giffoni International Film Festival, Cine A La Vista International Film Festival, Tallinn Black Nights Film Festival, Schlingel International Film Festival and Dublin International Film Festival. It eventually received a limited theatrical release in the UK on 20 May 2016.

It was then acquired by MUBI UK, and had its British TV premiere on FilmFour April 2017. It received its DVD and Blu-ray release by Network on 18 September 2017.

== Reception ==
=== Critical reception ===
Chicken received positive reviews and holds a 100% rating on Rotten Tomatoes based on 12 critics’ reviews. Leslie Felperin of The Guardian scored the film at three out of five, and said "first-time director Joe Stephenson elicits lively, empathic performances from his small cast". Mark Kermode rated the film at four out of five, describing Scott Chambers's performance as "superb". Anna Smith of Empire magazine gave the film a rating of four out of five, responding that the film is "an enjoyable, involving British Drama with and impressive turn from newcomer Scott Chambers". With a three-star rating from Cath Clarke of Time Out, she commented that Chicken is "an impressively acted British Drama about a young man with learning difficulties". CineVue praised the film and mentioned that it is "the sort of British indie which restores faith in cinema".

=== Accolades ===
- Grand Jury Award for Narrative Feature — Joe Stephenson (New Hampshire Film Festival 2015)
- Silver Griffoni Award for Best Film - Generation 18+ (2nd Prize) — Joe Stephenson & B Good Picture Company (Giffoni Film Festival 2016)
- Award for Best Film — Chicken (Cine A La Vista International Film Festival 2016)
- Scott Chamber's performance as Richard got a Special Critic's Circle mention (Dublin International Film Festival 2016)
- The film was shortlisted for Best Director (Joe Stephenson) and Best Newcomer (Scott Chambers) by the British Independent Film Awards.
