= Agatha and the Midnight Murders =

British drama movie

- Genre: Crime; Mystery
- Written by: Tom Dalton
- Directed by: Joe Stephenson
- Starring: Helen Baxendale; Blake Harrison; Jacqueline Boatswain; Gina Bramhill; Daniel Caltagirone; Thomas Chaanhing; Scott Chambers
- Composer: Blair Mowat
- Country of origin: United Kingdom
- Original language: English

Production
- Executive producers: Emily Dalton; Sebastian Cardwell
- Producers: Carol Harding; Tom Dalton
- Cinematography: Birgit Dierken
- Editor: Fiona Brands
- Running time: 93 Minutes
- Production companies: Darlow Smithson Productions; Factual Fiction

Original release
- Network: Channel 5
- Release: 5 October 2020

Agatha and the Midnight Murders is a 2020 British alternative history television drama film about crime writer Agatha Christie. The film premiered on Channel 5 in the United Kingdom on 5 October 2020, and on PBS in the United States 25 May 2021. It was directed by Joe Stephenson.

== Plot ==
Agatha Christie is having trouble collecting the American royalties on her published works. In a bid to make a private cash sale of a manuscript she decides to kill off her most famous character, Hercule Poirot. She hires a low-life man to accompany her as a bodyguard for a cut of the price. The action takes place in a hotel where Christie expects to complete the transaction. Christie and her bodyguard encounter the prospective buyers and a varied group of hotel guests. The suspense builds as a series of murders takes place in the hotel.

== Cast ==
- Helen Baxendale as Agatha Christie
- Blake Harrison as Travis Pickford
- Jacqueline Boatswain as Audrey Evans
- Gina Bramhill as Grace Nicory
- Daniel Caltagirone as Eli Schneider
- Thomas Chaanhing as Frankie Lei
- Scott Chambers as Clarence Allen
- Vanessa Grasse as Nell Lewis
- Jodie McNee as PC O'Hanauer
- Elizabeth Tan as Jun Yuhuan
- Morgan Watkins as Rocco Vella
- Alistair Petrie as Sir Malcolm Campbell

== Production ==
Filming took place in Malta, back-to-back with Agatha and the Curse of Ishtar.

== Reception ==
The show was poorly received by critics. Writing in The Guardian, Euan Ferguson said: "It was a mess: ill-plotted, playing bits for laughs or for horror without ever achieving either." Anita Singh of The Daily Telegraph gave the show 2 out of 5 stars, writing: "All of the characters' behaviour felt a little weird, and it was not clear if that was by accident or design. Some were caricatures while others were barely there."
