= Yusra Warsama =

English actress (born 2004)

- Born: 9 July 1987 (age 39); Abu Dhabi, United Arab Emirates
- Occupations: Writer, Director, Actress
- Years active: 2011–present

Yusra Warsama (born 9 July 1987) is a British playwright, theatre director, and stage, film and television actress.

== Early and personal life ==
Warsama was born in the United Arab Emirates to a Somali Islamic family displaced by the civil war in the country. As a young child her family moved from Abu Dhabi to England. She has a younger sister. She studied for a degree in criminology and sociology. She became a mother living in Manchester in her early twenties.

== Career ==
=== Stage ===
She became involved with the Contact Theatre in Manchester whilst a student. In 2015, she appeared at the Donmar Warehouse in James Graham's play The Vote, appearing alongside Judi Dench, amongst others. That year, a play she wrote based on female experience of genital mutilation, Rites, toured Great Britain.

In 2023, she wrote and directed Of All the Beautiful Things in the World a free-form adaptation of Federico García Lorca's The House of Bernarda Alba which moved the setting from 20th century Andalusia, Spain to 21st century Moss Side in Manchester.

She was a writer on the triple-bill of short plays Everywhere with her short play Gestation; the plays united in their exploration of similar socio-political themes such as race and class, as well as gender-based prejudice and discrimination, and toured in 2025.

=== Film and television ===
She could be seen in Call the Midwife on BBC One in 2017, playing a Somali woman who underwent a traumatic childbirth after suffering genital mutilation as a child. In 2019, she joined the cast for the second series of the Stephen King supernatural horror adaptation Castle Rock.

She appeared in Shane Meadows historical drama The Gallows Pole. She could be seen in Swedish drama series Deliver Me on Netflix.

In 2025, she had a leading role in Nadia Fall's film Brides, which premiered at the 2025 Sundance Film Festival. In January 2026, she could be seen in the Amazon Prime Video crime thriller Steal alongside Sophie Turner.

== Partial filmography ==
Year	Title	Role	Notes
2015	The Vote	Hanni	TV movie
2016	Vera	Zahra Suleiman	1 episode
2017	Call the Midwife	Nadifa	1 episode
2019	Cold Feet	Erica	1 episode
2019	Castle Rock	Dr. Nadia	10 episodes
2023	Unforgotten	Alaya Ali	1 episode
2023	The Gallows Pole	Bathsheba	3 episodes
2024	Deliver Me	Leila Ali	5 episodes
2025	Brides	Khadija	Film
2026	Steal	Glasses	5 episodes
