= List of Ackley Bridge episodes =

Ackley Bridge is a British drama television series that focuses on the lives of the staff and pupils at the fictional West Yorkshire secondary academy, Ackley Bridge College, in the fictitious mill town of Ackley Bridge. The first series consisted of six episodes and aired from 7 June to 12 July 2017. The second series consisted of twelve episodes and aired from 5 June to 21 August 2018. A third series consisting of eight episodes aired from 18 June 2019 to 6 August 2019.

In December 2019, Ackley Bridge was renewed for a fourth series, consisting of ten 30-minute episodes. The fourth series was originally set to air in September 2020, but due to the COVID-19 pandemic, filming was postponed. Production resumed in September 2020, and it was announced that the series would return to transmission in April 2021. In June 2021, it was announced that production on the fifth series of Ackley Bridge had commenced. The series premiered on All 4 in July 2022. In October 2022, Channel 4 announced that they had decided not to renew Ackley Bridge following the fifth series.

== Series overview ==
Series	Episodes	Originally released	
Series	Episodes	First released	Last released
1	6	7 June 2017	12 July 2017
2	12	5 June 2018	21 August 2018
3	8	18 June 2019	6 August 2019
4	10	19 April 2021	
5	10	11 July 2022	

== Episodes ==
=== Series 1 (2017) ===
No. overall	No. in series	Title	Directed by	Written by	Original release date	UK viewers (millions)
1	1	"First Day"	Penny Woolcock	Malcolm Campbell and Anya Reiss	7 June 2017	3.17
2	2	"Baby Sitting"	Penny Woolcock	Anya Reiss	14 June 2017	2.22
3	3	"Teacher Crush"	Robert Quinn	Ishy Din and Suhayla Bushra	21 June 2017	1.98
4	4	"Missy's Story"	Robert Quinn	Suhayla Bushra	28 June 2017	1.94
5	5	"Nas's Confession"	Jon East	Ayub Khan-Din	5 July 2017	1.87
6	6	"Outed"	Jon East	Anya Reiss	12 July 2017	1.78

=== Series 2 (2018) ===
No. overall	No. in series	Title	Directed by	Written by	Original release date	UK viewers (millions)
7	1	"Episode 1"	Penny Woolcock	Matt Evans	5 June 2018	1.92
8	2	"Episode 2"	Penny Woolcock	Perrie Balthazar	12 June 2018	1.66
9	3	"Episode 3"	Joe Stephenson	Ayub Khan-Din	19 June 2018	1.62
10	4	"Episode 4"	Joe Stephenson	Richard Davidson	26 June 2018	1.51
11	5	"Episode 5"	Tina Gharavi and Joe Stephenson	Ishy Din	4 July 2018	1.45
12	6	"Episode 6"	Joe Stephenson	Matt Evans	10 July 2018	1.36
13	7	"Episode 7"	Robert Quinn	Natalie Mitchell and Faryal Velmi	17 July 2018	1.66
14	8	"Episode 8"	Robert Quinn	Lisa Holdsworth	24 July 2018	1.56
15	9	"Episode 9"	Penny Woolcock	Maya Sondhi	31 July 2018	1.57
16	10	"Episode 10"	Penny Woolcock	Ayub Khan Din	7 August 2018	1.59
17	11	"Episode 11"	Robert Quinn	Richard Davidson	14 August 2018	1.64
18	12	"Episode 12"	Robert Quinn	Stephen Russell	21 August 2018	1.25

=== Series 3 (2019) ===
No. overall	No. in series	Title	Directed by	Written by	Original release date	UK viewers (millions)
19	1	"Oxford Dreams"	Penny Woolcock	Ayub Khan-Din	18 June 2019	1.52
20	2	"Consequences"	Penny Woolcock	Richard Davidson	25 June 2019	1.51
21	3	"Nothing Else to Say"	Sarmad Masud	Kim Revill	2 July 2019	1.41
22	4	"The Family Business"	Sarmad Masud	Faryal Velmi	9 July 2019	1.36
23	5	"Nowhere to Stay"	Rachna Suri	Adam Usden	16 July 2019	1.19
24	6	"They Don't Know Nothing"	Rachna Suri	Natalie Mitchell	23 July 2019	1.22
25	7	"Rumors"	Jo Johnson	Nicôle Lecky and Kim Revill	30 July 2019	1.18
26	8	"A Bright Rosy Future"	Jordan Hogg	Ayub Khan Din	6 August 2019	1.14

=== Series 4 (2021) ===
No. overall	No. in series	Title	Directed by	Written by	Original release date
27	1	"Episode 1"	Joe Stephenson	Ayub Khan Din	19 April 2021
28	2	"Episode 2"	Joe Stephenson	Ayub Khan Din	19 April 2021
29	3	"Episode 3"	Joe Stephenson	Suhayla El-Bushra	19 April 2021
30	4	"Episode 4"	Joe Stephenson	Kim Revill	19 April 2021
31	5	"Episode 5"	Joe Stephenson	Kim Revill	19 April 2021
32	6	"Episode 6"	Ethosheia Hylton	Kam Odedra	19 April 2021
33	7	"Episode 7"	Ethosheia Hylton	Kim Revill	19 April 2021
34	8	"Episode 8"	Ethosheia Hylton	Alex Stewart	19 April 2021
35	9	"Episode 9"	Ethosheia Hylton	Ayub Khan Din	19 April 2021
36	10	"Episode 10"	Ethosheia Hylton	Ayub Khan Din	19 April 2021

=== Series 5 (2022) ===
No. overall	No. in series	Title	Directed by	Written by	Original release date
37	1	"Episode 1"	Ashley Walters	Suhayla El-Sushra	11 July 2022
38	2	"Episode 2"	Ashley Walters	Suhayla El-Sushra	11 July 2022
39	3	"Episode 3"	Ashley Walters	Damian Mullen	11 July 2022
40	4	"Episode 4"	Ashley Walters	Alexander Stewart	11 July 2022
41	5	"Episode 5"	Ashley Walters	Kim Revill	11 July 2022
42	6	"Episode 6"	Reza Moradi	Emteaz Hussain	11 July 2022
43	7	"Episode 7"	Reza Moradi	Suhayla El-Sushra	11 July 2022
44	8	"Episode 8"	Reza Moradi	Damian Mullen	11 July 2022
45	9	"Episode 9"	Reza Moradi	Kim Revill	11 July 2022
46	10	"Episode 10"	Reza Moradi	Kim Revill	11 July 2022
