= John Lloyd (journalist) =

British journalist (1946)

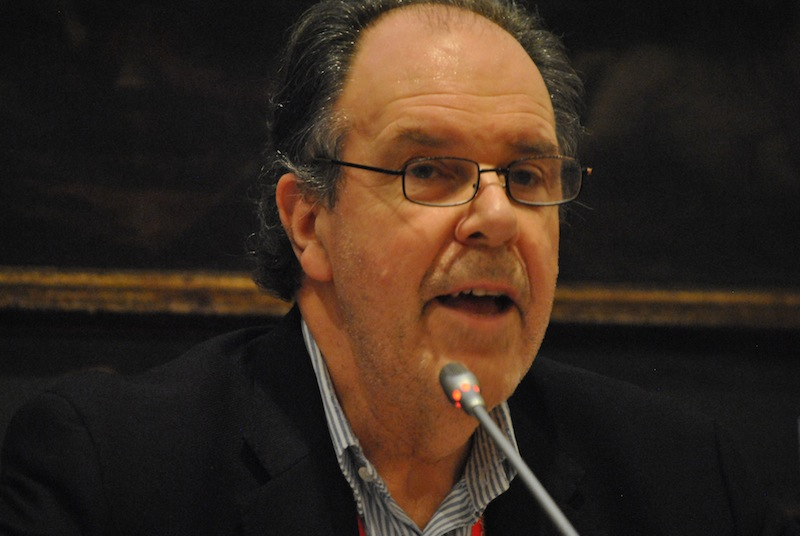
John Lloyd

John Nicol Fortune Lloyd (born 15 April 1946) is a British journalist who is currently contributing editor at the Financial Times and an Associate Fellow of Nuffield College, Oxford.

== Background ==
Lloyd was born and raised in Anstruther, Fife, by his grandparents and his mother, a beautician. He was educated at Waid Academy in the town and, after spending a short period working as a caddie in Canada, attended the University of Edinburgh, where he graduated with an upper-second class MA (Hons) degree in English literature in 1967.

== Career ==
Lloyd was initially employed as a writer for the alternative press, contributing articles to publications such as Ink and the London listings magazine Time Out, where he worked in the news section as Belfast correspondent. In 1976, he was hired as a producer for the London Weekend Television current-affairs programme Weekend World, and the following year he embarked on a twenty-year career working for the Financial Times: having begun as an industrial reporter and labour correspondent (covering, among other things, the Miners' Strike of 1984–5), he later became East European editor and then, from 1991 to 1995, Moscow correspondent. Lloyd left the Financial Times in 1986 upon being made editor of the New Statesman, but returned there after only one year. He was latterly a columnist for The Times from 1997 to 1998, and returned to the New Statesman as a contributor and associate editor from 1996 to 2003. In 2006, he co-founded the Reuters Institute for the Study of Journalism at the University of Oxford.

Lloyd is a member of the advisory board of the Moscow School of Political Studies. He has won awards for his journalism, including Specialist Writer of the Year in the British Press Awards and Journalist of the Year in the Granada What the Papers Say Awards.

His books include Loss Without Limit: The British Miners' Strike (with Martin Adeney, 1985); Rebirth of a Nation: An Anatomy of Russia (1998), What the Media Are Doing to Our Politics (2004), Reporting the EU: News, Media and the European Institutions (with Cristina Marconi, 2014), 'The Power and the Story' (2017) and Should Auld Alliance Be Forgot: The Great Mistake of Scottish Independence (2020).

== Personal life ==
Lloyd is married with one son from a previous marriage, the actor Jacob Fortune-Lloyd, who portrayed the Beatles' manager Brian Epstein in the biopic Midas Man.
