= The Killing Tree (film) =

- Directed by: Rhys Frake-Waterfield
- Screenplay by: Craig McLearie
- Cinematography: Vince Knight
- Edited by: Rhys Frake-Waterfield; Scott Chambers
- Music by: James Cox
- Production company: Dark Abyss Productions
- Distributed by: Uncork'd Entertainment
- Release date: November 2022
- Running time: 72 minutes

The Killing Tree is a 2022 British horror film directed by Rhys Frake-Waterfield, from a screenplay by Craig Mclearie. The film follows a serial killer named Clayton Slayter, who is resurrected as a murderous Christmas tree by his widow after being executed by police. The film received negative reviews from critics.

== Plot ==
Widow Morrigan was part of a serial killer couple who murdered several families on Christmas as punishment for not understanding the true meaning of the holiday. Her husband, Clayton Slayter, was arrested and executed after murdering the family of a young girl named Faith, who escaped and reported him to the police. Clayton took all of the blame to save Morrigan. One year later, determined to finish their work, she performs a satanic ritual to bring back her husband. However, as Morrigan performs the ritual wrong, he is reborn as a plastic Christmas tree that Morrigan used as part of the ritual. Furious over being reincarnated as a tree, he kills his wife in a fit of rage. Blaming Faith for their predicament, Clayton heads toward her house to kill her in revenge.

Meanwhile, Faith tries to cope with the events and decides to throw a Christmas party with her best friend Becky and all her friends. As the Christmas tree gets closer, Faith slowly gets drunk. The tree kills people randomly on its way to the house (such as a drunken man and a married couple) and eventually attacks it. In the end, only Faith survives. When the tree tries to attack her, the spirits of her parents appear in the form of a giant white tree and burn the Christmas tree into a pile of ash with fiery eyes. Faith loses consciousness.

When she wakes up, she is surrounded by her friends. She seems to have dreamed the whole thing and decides to move out of her parents' house. As the group leave the area, a nearby tree opens red glowing eyes.

== Production and release ==
The film's effects were created using a combination of practical effects and CGI. Practical scenes involving the tree were achieved with an actor wearing a tree costume.

The film was given a direct-to-video release by Uncork'd Entertainment in November 2022.

== Reception ==
The film largely received negative reviews from critics. Many reviews highlight the poor acting and unattractive effects, as well as the plot. The film has 17% on Rotten Tomatoes from critics.
