= Madekwe =

Madekwe is a surname. Notable people with the surname include:

- Archie Madekwe (born 1995), British actor and producer
- Ashley Madekwe (born 1983), British actress
