= The Mutation (film) =

- Directed by: Scott Jeffrey
- Written by: Scott Jeffrey
- Produced by: Scott Jeffrey
- Starring: Ricardo Freitas; Amanda-Jade Tyler; Abi Casson Thompson; James Robertson; Derek Nelson
- Music by: Andy Fosberry
- Production company: Jagged Edge Productions
- Release date: 4 August 2021
- Running time: 87 minutes
- Country: United Kingdom
- Language: English

The Mutation is a 2021 British horror film directed by Scott Jeffrey, starring Ricardo Freitas, Amanda-Jade Tyler, Abi Casson Thompson, James Robertson and Derek Nelson.

== Cast ==
- Ricardo Freitas as Allen Marsh
- Amanda-Jade Tyler as Dr. Linda Rowe
- Abi Casson Thompson as Julie Smith
- James Robertson as Norton
- Derek Nelson as Rat
- Megan Purvis as Sergeant Chambers
- Sarah T. Cohen as Tara
- Andrew Rolfe as Sargent McKenna
- Allis Smith by Monica
- Zoe Purdy as Hannah
- Jodie Benett as Jenna
- Kathi DeCuoto as Tina
- Brendan Jones as Rob

== Release ==
The film was released to digital and DVD on 5 October 2021.

== Reception ==
Phil Wheat of Nerdly rated the film 4 stars out of 5, writing that "It’s nothing groundbreaking, but it’s enjoyable". Janel Spiegel of HorrorNews.net wrote a positive review of the film, writing that it is "a fun movie to watch", and that it "definitely takes you on a ride with a wild creature."
