= Brides (2025 film) =

British drama film

- UK theatrical release poster
- Directed by: Nadia Fall
- Written by: Suhayla El-Bushra
- Produced by: Nicky Bentham; Marica Stocchi
- Starring: Ebada Hassan; Safiyya Ingar; Yusra Warsama; Cemre Ebuzziya; Aziz Capkurt
- Production companies: Neon Films; Rosamont
- Distributed by: Vue Lumière (United Kingdom)
- Release dates: January 24, 2025 (Sundance); September 26, 2025 (United Kingdom)
- Running time: 93 minutes
- Countries: United Kingdom; Italy
- Language: English

Brides is a 2025 British-Italian film directed by Nadia Fall from a screenplay by Suhayla El-Bushra. It is starring Ebada Hassan and Safiyya Ingar. The film premiered at the 2025 Sundance Film Festival. The film was inspired by the real-life events of the Bethnal Green trio.

== Synopsis ==
Two teenage girls decide to run away from the United Kingdom to travel to Syria to join ISIS after experiencing Islamophobic discrimination in school. When their fixer doesn't turn up to their arranged meeting place, they get stranded in Istanbul, and must find a way to travel to the Syrian border before someone realises they've run away from home.

== Cast ==
- Ebada Hassan
- Safiyya Ingar
- Yusra Warsama
- Cemre Ebuzziya
- Aziz Capkurt

== Production ==
The film comes from director Nadia Fall, in her feature-length debut, and screenwriter Suhayla El-Bushra. It is produced by Nicky Bentham for Neon Films alongside Marica Stocchi for Rosamont.

Catryn Ramasut and Alice Lusher of Ie Ie productions are co-producers. It is a UK and Italian co-production and is supported by the BFI and Ffilm Cymru Wales, Creative Wales, Great Point Media, the Italian Ministry of Culture Minority Co-production Fund, Friuli Venezia Giuila Audiovisual regional fund and Rai Cinema with Bankside Films handling international sales. It was developed with the BFI and won the Breaking Through the Lens Action Grant in 2023.

Principal photography took place in Wales, Turkey and Italy. The bus station scene was shot at the same bus station in Turkey where Shamima Begum and her friends waited.

== Release ==
The film premiered at the 2025 Sundance Film Festival. It screened at the Munich Film Festival where it won the Fritz Gerlich Trophy for its contribution to human rights and antiracism through cinema. The jury described Brides as an examination of how young people must be "cared for with care and attention, warned against, and protected from dangerous manipulation," and shows "how a series of minor catastrophes ultimately escalate into a major catastrophe." The jury for the prize continued, "the film impresses with its topicality”.

It also screened in the Open Air Premiere Programme at the 31st Sarajevo Film Festival in August 2025 where it won the TeenArena Jury Award for Best Feature Film and in the Official Selection of the Edinburgh International Film Festival.

It will compete for IFFI ICFT UNESCO Gandhi Medal at the 56th International Film Festival of India in November 2025.

Brides was released in the United Kingdom on September 26, 2025 by Vue Lumière, with a nationwide preview day on September 23 and a special Q&A screening at BFI Southbank on September 25.

== Reception ==
On the review aggregator website Rotten Tomatoes, 83% of 29 critics' reviews are positive, with an average rating of 6.0/10. BFI praises the movie for its risk taking and empathy; conversely, The Times gives the movie a 2/10, praising the acting and visuals but pointing out the one-dimensionality of the movie and the fact that every non-muslim British character is painted as a "bigoted white".

== Accolades ==
For their roles in the film, in October 2025 Hassan and Ingar were nominated for the British Independent Film Award for Breakthrough Performance. They were also nominated at the British Independent Film Awards 2025 for best joint lead performance.
