= Jacob Fortune-Lloyd =

British actor

- Born: Jacob Fortune Lloyd; Hillingdon, Greater London, England
- Education: University of Oxford; Guildhall School of Music and Drama
- Occupation: Actor
- Years active: 2015–present

Jacob Fortune-Lloyd is an English actor. He played the role of Francis Weston in the BBC series Wolf Hall (2015), Francesco Salviati in Medici (2018), Townes in the Netflix chess period drama The Queen's Gambit (2020), Grigory Petrov in The Great (2023), detective Charles Whiteman in Bodies (2023), and Brian Epstein in Midas Man (2024). Fortune-Lloyd has also appeared in the films Crooked House (2017), Star Wars: The Rise of Skywalker (2019), and See How They Run (2021).

== Early life and education ==
Jacob Fortune-Lloyd was born in the London Borough of Hillingdon, the son of Scottish journalist John Lloyd. He is Jewish.

He studied at St. Anne's College at Oxford University, where he earned a Bachelor of Arts in English literature. He then went on to train at the Guildhall School of Music and Drama, graduating in 2014. As a student, he performed in a number of plays, including Agamemnon, The Man of Mode, Guys & Dolls, and medieval mystery plays.

== Career ==
As a theatre actor, Fortune-Lloyd starred in a number of Royal Shakespeare Company theatre and other productions, including The Importance of Being Earnest, The Merchant of Venice The Moderate Soprano, Macbeth, and Othello.

He starred as Archbishop Francesco Salviati in the medieval drama series Medici in 2018, and has appeared as a Sith fleet officer in Star Wars: The Rise of Skywalker (Episode IX). He starred as Francis Weston for five episodes of the BAFTA-winning series Wolf Hall alongside Mark Rylance, Claire Foy, and Jonathan Pryce. Fortune-Lloyd starred as D.L. Townes for four episodes of the Netflix chess miniseries The Queen's Gambit alongside Anya Taylor-Joy.

In 2021, Fortune-Lloyd appeared as Gideon Tooms in the week 15 episode of Midsomer Murders.

He was cast as the Beatles' former manager Brian Epstein in the film Midas Man, which began filming in 2021.

In 2023, Fortune-Lloyd appeared as Ricky Monke in the TV series The Power. He also plays The Duke of Buckingham in two French action adventure films, The Three Musketeers: D'Artagnan and The Three Musketeers: Milady, in a cast that includes Vincent Cassel and Eva Green.

== Recognition ==
In 2022, Fortune-Lloyd was named in Screen International's "Stars of Tomorrow" for all his film, television, and theatre work to date.

== Filmography ==
=== Film ===
Year	Title	Role	Notes
2017	Crooked House	Brent	
2019	Star Wars: The Rise of Skywalker	Sith Fleet Officer	
2021	The Last Letter from Your Lover	Andrew	
2021	Capture	Jamie	Short film
2022	Canyon Del Muerto	Jean Charlot	
2022	See How They Run	Gio	
2023	The Three Musketeers: D'Artagnan	The Duke of Buckingham	
2023	The Three Musketeers: Milady	The Duke of Buckingham	
2024	Midas Man	Brian Epstein	Also producer
TBA	As Deep as the Grave	Jean Charlot	Post-production

=== Television ===
Year	Title	Role	Notes
2015	Wolf Hall	Francis Weston	5 episodes
2016	The Living and the Dead	1920s Man	Episode 6
2017	The Collection	Cesar	3 episodes: "The Weekend", "The Afterglow", "The Launch"
2018	Medici	Francesco Salviati	Season 2–7 episodes
2018	Endeavour	Don Mercer	Series 5 episode 3: "Passenger"
2020	Strike Back	Spiegel	2 episodes: "Vendetta": Part 3 and 4
2020	The Queen's Gambit	Townes	3 episodes: "Exchanges", "Doubled Pawns", "End Game"
2021	Midsomer Murders	Gideon Tooms	Season 22 episode 2: "The Stitcher Society"
2023	The Power	Ricky Monke	Recurring role
2023	The Great	Grigory Petrov	Season 3–6 episodes
2023	Bodies	DS Karl "Charles Whiteman" Weissman	Main role
2025	The Rig	Darian York	Season 2
2025	Bookish	Stewart Howard	
2026	Steal	DCI Demetrius "Rhys" Covaci	Main role

=== Live streaming theatre ===
Year	Title	Role
2015	Royal Shakespeare Company: The Merchant of Venice	Bassanio
2015	Royal Shakespeare Company: Othello	Cassio
2018	Oscar Wilde Season: The Importance of Being Earnest	John Worthing

=== Music video ===
Year	Title	Artist	Role
2021	"How Does It Feel"	London Grammar	Main male
