= Doctor Jekyll (film) =

2023 film by Joe Stephenson

- Theatrical release poster
- Directed by: Joe Stephenson
- Written by: Dan Kelly-Mulhern
- Based on: Strange Case of Dr. Jekyll & Mr. Hyde; 1886 novella by Robert Louis Stevenson
- Produced by: Liam Coutts; Joe Stephenson; Guy de Beaujeu
- Starring: Eddie Izzard; Scott Chambers; Robyn Cara; Morgan Watkins; Jonathan Hyde; Simon Callow; Lindsay Duncan
- Cinematography: Birgit Dierken
- Edited by: Joe Stephenson; Andrew Hulme
- Music by: Blair Mowat
- Production companies: B-Good Picture Company; Fulwell 73
- Distributed by: Hammer Studios
- Release dates: 25 August 2023 (FrightFest); 27 October 2023
- Running time: 89 minutes
- Country: United Kingdom
- Language: English
- Box office: $21,524

Doctor Jekyll is a 2023 British Gothic horror film directed by Joe Stephenson, written by Dan Kelly-Mulhern, and starring Eddie Izzard as the title character. It is an adaptation of the 1886 novella Strange Case of Dr. Jekyll & Mr. Hyde by Robert Louis Stevenson.

The film had its world premiere at FrightFest on 25 August 2023 and was released in the United Kingdom on 27 October 2023. It received mixed reviews.

== Cast ==
- Eddie Izzard as Dr. Nina Jekyll / Rachel Hyde
- Scott Chambers as Rob Stevenson
- Lindsay Duncan as Sandra Poole
- Robyn Cara as Maeve
- Jonathan Hyde as Henry Jekyll
- Morgan Watkins as Ewan
- Simon Callow as Journalist
- Tony Jayawardena as Malcolm

== Production ==
The project was announced in February 2022, with Eddie Izzard and Scott Chambers revealed to be starring, with Joe Stephenson attached as director, and Dan Kelly-Mulhern making his screenwriting debut. Stephenson, Guy de Beaujeu, Liam Coutts and Christian Angermayer were unveiled as producers, along with B Good Picture Company and Fluidity Films as the production companies. In March, Lindsay Duncan and Simon Callow were revealed to have joined the cast, alongside more of the supporting cast. Principal photography also concluded that month.

== Release ==
In March 2022, Hammer Studios acquired UK distribution rights. Doctor Jekyll had its world premiere at FrightFest on 25 August 2023. It was released in the United Kingdom on 27 October 2023. The film was released in the United States on 2 August 2024.

== Reception ==
On the review aggregator website Rotten Tomatoes, 42% of 33 critics' reviews are positive, with an average rating of 4.9/10.

Todd Gilchrist of Variety wrote, "Though Stephenson offers plenty of suitably spooky imagery, and importantly finds a more-than-game collaborator in Izzard as both the good and evil doctor, Doctor Jekyll is meandering and empty, an update with neither enough loyalty to its source material or imagination to make its departures meaningful". Lillian Crawford writing for Little White Lies gave the film a positive review, writing, "the sort of horror that has you laughing one minute and throwing your popcorn in the air in fright the next. Izzard also subverts the fear of gender that has long haunted horror cinema by both playing to and away from the ongoing 'trans scare'. It looks like Hammer has returned from the dead"
