= Pinocchio Unstrung =

2026 film by Rhys Frake-Waterfield

- Theatrical release poster
- Directed by: Rhys Frake-Waterfield
- Screenplay by: Rhys Frake-Waterfield
- Based on: The Adventures of Pinocchio by Carlo Collodi
- Produced by: Rhys Frake-Waterfield; Scott Chambers
- Starring: Richard Brake; Robert Englund; Cameron Bell; Jessica Balmer; Jude-Evan Lloyd
- Cinematography: Vince Knight
- Edited by: Dan Allen; Rhys Frake-Waterfield
- Music by: Andrew Scott Bell
- Production companies: Jagged Edge Productions; ITN Distribution
- Distributed by: Altitude Film Distribution
- Release dates: 11 April 2026 (Brussels); 24 July 2026 (United Kingdom)
- Running time: 82 minutes
- Country: United Kingdom
- Language: English
- Box office: $818,974

Pinocchio Unstrung is a 2026 British independent slasher film written and directed by Rhys Frake-Waterfield. It is the fifth instalment in The Twisted Childhood Universe (TCU) and serves as a horror retelling of Carlo Collodi's 1883 novel The Adventures of Pinocchio. The film stars Richard Brake, Robert Englund, Cameron Bell, and Jessica Balmer, with Jude-Evan Lloyd as the voice of the title character. It follows Geppetto's grandson James, who develops a friendship with Pinocchio until his naïve nature results in the puppet going on a crusade to eliminate all things bad.

First announced in January 2024 as a Pinocchio-based horror film, the film was subsequently revealed to be set in the TCU shared continuity. The cast was announced between November 2024 and October 2025, with Peter DeSouza-Feighoney and Scott Chambers reprising their roles from Peter Pan's Neverland Nightmare and Winnie-the-Pooh: Blood and Honey 2 as Michael Darling and Christopher Robin, respectively.

Pinocchio Unstrung premiered at the Brussels International Fantastic Film Festival on 11 April 2026, before it was theatrically released worldwide on 24 July 2026, by ITN Distribution. This is the first film in the Twisted Childhood Universe to receive generally positive reviews from critics.

== Plot ==
Fourteen-year-old James is sent to live with his grandfather Geppetto after his parents die in a car accident. He makes friends with two other children, Zach and Dudley, but Zach dies from terminal cancer shortly after. Geppetto promises to build a friend who will never abandon his grandson again.

One year later, James is constantly bullied by high school students Trey and Logan. That night, James is awakened by strange noises and enters the basement where Geppetto works. He introduces James to Pinocchio, a sentient wooden puppet whose nose grows every time he lies. Geppetto explains he built Pinocchio to be James' new friend. As James and Pinocchio bond to a brother-like friendship, the latter learns about human anatomy and wishes to become a real boy. While James is at school, Pinocchio enters the basement and finds a disfigured wooden creature who introduces herself as Pinocchio's "Wood Mother". She reminds Pinocchio that he is just a puppet and will need human organs to become "real." The next day, James takes Pinocchio to school; he explores the gym, but accidentally causes a chain reaction that kills James' teacher with a treadmill and another with a weight barbell. Later, James introduces Pinocchio to Dudley and his other friend Mia.

While returning home in a taxi, a drunk driver crashes into them and James is hospitalised under the care of Dr. Christopher Robin. (Note: As depicted in Winnie-the-Pooh: Blood and Honey 2 (2024).) Remembering the Wood Mother's words and realising that perhaps he should eliminate the people who harm James, Pinocchio sneaks into the driver's hospital room, rips the skin off his face and disembowels him to put his organs into his wooden chest. James returns home and, along with Mia and Dudley, enters the basement and finds notes written by Geppetto about his "failed works". Meanwhile, Pinocchio tells his Wood Mother about the killings, who congratulates him. A talkative cricket with a humanoid body is introduced to Pinocchio to "keep [him] on the right path and obey the grown-ups," who encourages him to kill anybody who has put James in danger. Together, they murder James' school dentist to take out her teeth.

James, Mia, and Dudley watch tapes that reveal Geppetto created more wooden puppets before Pinocchio, whom he destroyed because he considered them imperfect to be James' friends. Upon learning about Pinocchio's killing spree, James, Mia, and Dudley attempt to warn Trey and Logan as they are his next targets. Pinocchio arrives at Trey's house and breaks Logan's girlfriend Georgia's jaw with a mallet in the pool. The Cricket carries a wire into the pool to fatally electrocute her while Pinocchio shoves Logan's tongue down his throat and rips out his eyeballs. Inside the house, Pinocchio kills Trey's girlfriend Amanda after she steps on his nose in the shower, tearing off her scalp to use it, and murders Trey by impaling his skull with his growing nose. Pinocchio later wears the skin of one of his victims, even creating a "puppet" of his own out of the various parts of his victims.

Geppetto takes Pinocchio back home, repressing him for the murders. Realising that his Wood Mother and the Cricket tricked him into murdering innocents, Pinocchio kills them both with a sledgehammer. James, Mia, and Dudley arrive at the basement just as Geppetto is about to destroy Pinocchio. When Pinocchio asks how he came to life, Geppetto reveals to have used Zach's corpse to build him, transferring his soul into the puppet. As James rescues Pinocchio, Geppetto shoots Dudley dead and knocks James unconscious before pursuing Mia to kill her while revealing to be an apprentice of the late Dr. Arthur Gallup, continuing with his experiments to resurrect dead children. James stabs Geppetto before Pinocchio holds him at gunpoint.

Pinocchio shoots at Geppetto but misses and hits a panel that releases an aggressive wooden creature, who kills Geppetto as the entire house begins to burn. James, Mia, and Pinocchio manage to escape and promise to forget what happened. When Pinocchio reveals that he did not enjoy killing people, his nose begins to grow again.

In a post-credits scene, the Cricket is revealed to have survived and he uses the vines of the tree to resurrect Geppetto's corpse.

== Cast ==
- Richard Brake as Geppetto
- Robert Englund as the voice of the Talking Cricket
- Cameron Bell as James
- Jessica Balmer as Mia
- Jude-Evan Lloyd as the voice of Pinocchio
  - He, built by Todd Masters and MastersFX, was also physically operated on set by Lewis Santer and Martin Portlock
- Elliott Spilling as Zach
- Emma Tate as the voice of the Wood Mother
- Jack Art Gray as Dudley
- Toni Olabanji as Trey
- Luca Marandola as Logan
- Mya Brown as Georgia
- Karolina Knight as Amanda
- Belinda Fenty as the Dentist
- Charlotte Jackson as Nurse
- Kelly Rian Sanson as Miss Daniels
- Tom Jackson as Roger
- Jay Robertson as Drunk Driver
- Amanda Jane York as Drunk Driver's Wife

Additionally, Scott Chambers reprises his role as Christopher Robin from Winnie-the-Pooh: Blood and Honey 2 while Peter DeSouza-Feighoney reprises his role as Michael Darling from Peter Pan's Neverland Nightmare.

== Production ==
=== Development ===
In January 2024, it was announced that a horror film centered around the titular character from The Adventures of Pinocchio was in development, while it was also revealed that additional characters from other childhood stories would be revealed as a part of The Twisted Childhood Universe (TCU). Officially titled Pinocchio Unstrung, the first promotional concept art was released, with the plot stated to be revealed at a later time. The film was written and directed by Rhys Frake-Waterfield. The director had originally planned to direct Peter Pan's Neverland Nightmare, though he realised the potential with Pinocchio Unstrung as it involved puppetry and therefor chose to direct the latter film instead. To focus entirely on Pinocchio Unstrung, Frake-Waterfield decided not to return as director for Winnie-the-Pooh: Blood and Honey 3 (letting Scott Chambers take over instead) as to avoid "stretching [himself] too thin." Frake-Waterfield revealed the film would be an "extremely unique and R-rated depiction of Pinocchio," featuring a "high kill count, a subversion of the original story, and lots of practical gore." The film would feature a scene where Pinocchio wears the skin of his victims to "feel like a real boy." Chambers in early 2025 expressed in an interview with MovieWeb that Pinocchio would serve as the film's lead character and that compared to the other films in the TCU, Pinocchio Unstrung would "destroy childhoods."

Frake-Waterfield in July 2026 expressed Pinocchio in the film would start out naive and innocent before evolving into a homicidal maniac thanks to the negative influence of others, stating, "The general message behind it is about how the voices which surround children can shape their understanding of the world, and lean them different paths." He noted the original source material dealt with themes of children being manipulated by adult figures, as the novel features Pinocchio occasionally being deceived and led down the wrong path by characters such as the Fox and the Cat; while Pinocchio Unstrung features neither of those characters, the forces around him such as the Wood Mother, the Talking Cricket and even Geppetto to an extent guide the route between right and wrong, manipulating Pinocchio into going down a dark path. The director revealed that there were two options for a direction to take the IP in; a "creepy doll like Annabelle" or more of a "campy, crafty and fun route." Frake-Waterfield chose the latter as it fit his directing style. The film was influenced by Guillermo del Toro's Pinocchio for relying entirely on practical effects (stop-motion), which he believed gave the film a "kooky, crafty feel," especially as the source material features "things being handcrafted". In March 2026, the film was described by Frake-Waterfield as a "twisted coming-of-age story told from the puppet's perspective: a creation struggling for autonomy while being manipulated by the sinister forces around him, from Robert Englund's sinister Talking Cricket to Richard Brake's obsessive Geppetto."

=== Casting ===
In November 2024, Robert Englund was cast in a lead role, later revealed to be the Talking Cricket, while Richard Brake was cast as Geppetto. One of Englund's acting roles during his childhood years at a children's theatre program Teenage Drama Workshop was in fact the titular character Pinocchio; Englund saw an opportunity to close the decade-long loop by voicing the Cricket. Englund wanted to avoid portraying the Cricket's laugh too closely to his iconic role Freddy Krueger, choosing to instead make it "a little higher, a little more hysterical, as if you could see little bit into Cricket's psychosis." Brake was aware of Winnie-the-Pooh: Blood and Honey and its negative reception when offered the role of Geppetto, and considered turning it down until he read the script and ended up loving it. Brake enjoyed having to play a character that wasn't “just some unhinged guy" and showed a "particular grandfatherly side," being a father of three boys himself; "It was really fun to be able to do that and to really pull it off, because you need to think he's a lovely guy before you see who he really is."

Cameron Bell, Jessica Balmer, Jack Art Gray and Peter DeSouza-Feighoney also star. In October 2025, Jude-Evan Lloyd was cast as the voice of Pinocchio. Emma Tate was added to the cast under the name "Carving," which was eventually revealed to be the Wood Mother. DeSouza-Feighoney reprised his role from Peter Pan's Neverland Nightmare as Michael Darling, while Chambers reprised his role from Winnie-the-Pooh: Blood and Honey 2 as Christopher Robin.

=== Filming ===
Principal photography took place by November 2024. Filming was originally set to commence in September 2024 and October 2024. The character of Pinocchio was a fully practical animatronic because Frake-Waterfield really wanted him to feel real. Todd Masters at MastersFX handled the puppetry for the film after his work on the Child's Play reboot (2019). Regarding Pinocchio's design, the filmmakers wanted it to have a balance between being cute and creepy, deciding that at times Pinocchio would feel strange but innocent, yet other times would become more sinister when his nose grows longer. Two identical-looking puppets were created which they occasionally called "A" and "B" or "One" and "Two" from time to time before they came up with official names; "Lighty" (which ironically enough was quite heavy despite its name) which was used for scenes such as in the pool and "Stunty", a non-animatronic with an inanimate head and spots for rods to move its body, which Masters expressed was "the most abused puppet" because of how often it was used during filming, such as throwing it down the stairs. Two to eight puppeteers would operate the doll depending on the shot and whether just the head or the whole body was used. Lewis Santer and Martin Portlock (who portrayed Tigger and Peter Pan in the TCU, respectively), were involved as puppeteers; Portlock often performed the dialouge for Pinocchio, operating a joystick system that controlled his facial movements.

Right before the crew flew out to London to begin filming, they realised Geppetto needed puppets for his workshop bench in the background. Quickly, they took a few prototype models and painted them to have them resemble Geppetto's failed projects. Two of these models were called "Shitty" and "Cruddy." Because of the film's low budget, a green bedsheet was used for green screens. The animated opening sequence (alongside the title card and end credits) was entirely practical; Frake-Waterfield, Chambers, cinematographer Vince Knight and his girlfriend Karolina Knight used cutout puppets with one of Chambers's bathroom towels as a backdrop, working in the front room on New Years Eve.

== Music ==
Pinocchio Unstrung (Original Motion Picture Soundtrack)

Soundtrack album by Andrew Scott Bell
- Released: 21 July 2026
- Genre: Horror
- Length: 80:38
- Label: Dark House Music

Pinocchio Unstrung (Original Motion Picture Soundtrack) is the soundtrack album for the film. Andrew Scott Bell composed the film's score. The soundtrack was released by Dark House Music on 21 July 2026.

All music is composed by Andrew Scott Bell.

No.	Title	Length
1.	"Pinocchio: Unstrung"	1:51
2.	"Life Is Full of Endless Possibilities"	1:44
3.	"Once Upon a Time There Was a Piece of Wood"	3:40
4.	"James Meets Pinocchio"	1:31
5.	"The Adventures of Pinocchio"	2:55
6.	"Woodmother Teaches Pinocchio How to Be Real"	2:31
7.	"Pinocchio Touches Grass"	0:33
8.	"Good Boys Go Gladly to School"	3:08
9.	"A Lesson in Gravity"	1:03
10.	"James Makes a Wish"	2:06
11.	"Pinocchio Meets New Friends"	0:48
12.	"A Crash Course in Dentistry"	1:09
13.	"Hospital Mischief"	2:13
14.	"Organs and Stuff!"	3:37
15.	"Sneaking Through the Hospital"	1:01
16.	"Geppetto's Workshop"	3:18
17.	"Piece by Piece to Make Yourself Whole"	2:17
18.	"Why Can't He Just Make Toys"	2:17
19.	"Pinocchio Meets Cricket"	1:51
20.	"Let's Give You a Smile"	2:35
21.	"Flagitious FaceTime"	1:54
22.	"Pinocchio Learns to Swim / Eyes on Me"	3:00
23.	"Homicidal Doll on the Loose"	1:13
24.	"Peeping Pinok / A Hairy Situation"	3:10
25.	"One Hell of a Glow Up, Kid"	1:11
26.	"Meat Marionette"	1:34
27.	"It's Hammer Time"	1:21
28.	"Pinocchio Discovers His Roots"	2:05
29.	"Rescuing Pinocchio"	2:28
30.	"Here's Geppetto!"	2:02
31.	"I'm Not Your Puppet Anymore"	2:48
32.	"We'll Lie / Credits"	2:44
33.	"Truly Friends (from Karaoke Night) BFF by Cry Babies"	1:48
34.	"President feat. Jenna, Lala and Phoebe (from Karaoke Night) BFF by Cry Babies"	2:19
35.	"Shadow (from Karaoke Night) BFF by Cry Babies"	1:58
36.	"Voces del Pasado feat. Valeria Cuevas from (The Casagrandes Movie: Songs From and Inspired by the Original Motion Picture)/Credits"	4:30
Total length:		80:38

== Release ==
Pinocchio Unstrung had its world premiere at the Brussels International Fantastic Film Festival on 11 April 2026. The film was theatrically released in North America on 24 July 2026, under Viva Pictures. Altitude Film Distribution also released the film on the same date in the United Kingdom. It was previously set to be released in 2025. The film had a worldwide theatrical release by ITN Distribution.

== Reception ==
=== Box office ===
Pinocchio Unstrung grossed $625,726 in the United States and Canada, and $193,248 in other territories, for a worldwide total of $818,974.

=== Critical response ===
On the review aggregator website Rotten Tomatoes, 76% of 25 critics' reviews are positive, with an average rating of 5.8/10. The website's consensus reads: "Pinocchio: Unstrung gleefully twists a children's classic into a gruesome, darkly hilarious horror romp, balancing brutal gore, campy absurdity, and impressive practical effects." Metacritic, which uses a weighted average, assigned the film a score of 50 out of 100, based on 4 critics, indicating "mixed or average" reviews.

== See also ==
- Pinocchio's Revenge
