= Steal (2026 TV series) =

British crime thriller television series

- Official release poster
- Genre: Crime drama; Financial thriller
- Created by: Sotiris Nikias
- Directed by: Sam Miller; Hettie Macdonald
- Starring: Sophie Turner; Archie Madekwe; Jacob Fortune-Lloyd
- Country of origin: United Kingdom
- Original language: English
- No. of series: 1
- No. of episodes: 6

Production
- Executive producers: Greg Brenman; Rebecca De Souza; Sam Miller
- Producers: Nuala O'Leary; Vivien Kenny
- Running time: 41-53 minutes
- Production companies: Drama Republic; Amazon MGM Studios

Original release
- Network: Amazon Prime Video
- Release: 21 January 2026

Steal is a British crime thriller television series created by Sotiris Nikias for Amazon Prime Video, starring Sophie Turner, Archie Madekwe and Jacob Fortune-Lloyd. It centres on the fallout of a robbery at a financial management company. It premiered on 21 January 2026.

== Premise ==
Zara Dunne, an office worker for pension management company Lochmill Capital, is caught up in a major robbery by an armed gang. However, it soon emerges she may have had a key role in the crime.

== Cast ==
=== Main ===
- Sophie Turner as Zara Dunne, a trade processor at Lochmill Capital
- Jacob Fortune-Lloyd as DCI Demetrius 'Rhys' Covaci, the lead robbery investigator
- Archie Madekwe as Luke Selborn, a trade processor at Lochmill Capital

=== Recurring ===
- Jonathan Slinger as London, the leader of a team of armed robbers
- Andrew Howard as Sniper / Morgan Trahern, a member of London's team
- Ellie James as DI Ellie Lloyd, Covaci's second in command
- Patrick O'Kane as DSU Duff Nichols, Covaci's supervisor
- Harry Michell as Milo Carter-Walsh, a senior risk analyst and investment committee member at Lochmill Capital
- Anastasia Hille as Haley Dunne, an alcoholic psychiatric nurse and Zara's mother
- Thomas Larkin as Wayne, a risk analyst at Lochmill Capital
- Sarah Belcher as Kate Shaw, the head of risk management and investment committee member at Lochmill Capital
- Tara Summers as Sophia, a manager at Lochmill Capital
- Díana Bermudez as Tall, a member of London's team
- Spike Leighton as Junior, a member of London's team
- Yusra Warsama as Glasses, a member of London's team
- Andrew Koji as Darren Yoshida, a police financial investigator
- Elòise Thomas as Myrtle Clarke, an intern at Lochmill Capital
- Tomisin Ajani as Scots, a member of London's team
- Kadiesha Belgrave as Chioma, a trade processor at Lochmill Capital
- Dominic Mafham as George Cartwright, the chief investment officer at Lochmill Capital
- Peter Mullan as Sir Toby Gould, CEO of Gould-Simmons
- Anna Maxwell Martin as a senior MI5 official
- Simon Bird as Oliver Davies, a comedian and talk show host
- Peter de Jersey as Andrew Bains, the Chancellor of the Exchequer

== Episodes ==
No.	Title	Directed by	Written by	Original release date
1	Fill or Kill	Sam Miller	Sotiris Nikitas	21 January 2026
Trade processor Zara Dunne welcomes intern Myrtle Clarke to Lochmill Capital, a pension fund investment management firm based in The Scalpel. A group of highly trained armed robbers, led by "London", take the office hostage and use phone jammers to prevent outside communication. London's team forces processor Luke to commit trades worth over £4 billion, members of the investment committee to approve them, and Zara to confirm with the custodian bank. This clears out almost all of the firm's capital. Receptionist Donny signals the neighbouring Leadenhall Building for help and is beaten. The robbers flee when the money hits their account and before Greater London Police AFO's arrive. DCI Rhys Covaci is assigned to lead the investigation and tells Zara she is a significant witness. Recovering from a nosebleed, Zara smiles when she overhears colleagues suggesting the robbery was an inside job.
2	Face Value	Sam Miller	Sotiris Nikitas	21 January 2026
Zara and Luke are revealed to be implicated, and both receive £5 million in Bitcoin instead of the promised £100k for providing their logins. Zara hides her cold wallet at her estranged mother Haley's house. Luke feels pressure after being questioned by Covaci and financial investigator Darren Yoshida. Covaci is told by his superior, DSU Nichols, there is another level to the investigation. Yoshida discovers the money was sent to accounts in the British Virgin Islands. Covaci attends an unlicensed casino to gamble. Luke is surveilled by both the police as well as London and his team. Increasingly paranoid, he calls Covaci and asks to meet him. Zara witnesses robbers Burly, Junior and Sniper kidnap Luke from his flat, but he injures Burly with a screwdriver. She finds a discarded tranquilizer vial with Sniper's bloody fingerprint on it, but is confronted by Covaci who arrives as she leaves the building.
3	Short Run	Sam Miller	Sotiris Nikitas	21 January 2026
In a flashback, Zara and Luke meet with London's team, who claim to be hackers wanting to rob a controversial tobacco fund. They agree to provide their logins for £100k each. Zara claims she was at Luke's flat to check up on him. Covaci has MI5 officer Sam Fitch join his team. Fitch and DI Ellie Lloyd take Zara's statement, but Lloyd becomes suspicious when he tries to pull surveillance on her. Covaci is shown to be in debt to his bookie. Yoshida discovers via unofficial channels the British Virgin Islands accounts are linked to defense contractor Gould-Simmons. Zara lifts Sniper's fingerprint from the vial and threatens London's team with it. Haley steals Zara's cold wallet and demands 20% in exchange for it as she lost her pension. Nichols confirms pressure from above, and urges Covaci recuse himself from the case. Covaci saves Zara from being picked up by MI5, and she confesses her involvement.
4	Risk On	Hettie Macdonald	Poppy Cogan & Sotiris Nikitas	21 January 2026
Zara reluctantly agrees to work with Covaci against MI5 in exchange for protection and leniency. She gives him the fingerprint, and he discovers the abandoned warehouse that London's team worked from. Covaci suggests someone senior at Lochmill is involved. Zara finds information implicating the risk management team. The police link Gould-Simmons to the money after Yoshida leaks his discovery to The Times. Covaci and Fitch interview CEO Sir Toby Gould, who says the money was hacked from his account (along with £147 million of his own funds) shortly after being transferred, and provides bank statements. Sniper becomes paranoid about Zara having his print and the team being confined to a safehouse with Luke by their employer. Luke tries to bribe Sniper to free him, as he has already been paid. Covaci struggles to find an additional £100k to clear his gambling debts. Zara is kidnapped.
5	Pay Yourself First	Hettie Macdonald	Shyam Popat & Sotiris Nikitas	21 January 2026
Zara is taken to an MI5 official, who pressures her to further research and identify the Lochmill insider in exchange for a new identity. Having grown closer, Covaci and Zara sleep together. A further leak implicates the UK Chancellor of the Exchequer, Andrew Bains, receiving the stolen money. Zara's checks implicate risk analyst Milo Carter-Walsh, who received £20 million and chose to implicate himself for an early retirement. When confronted, he tells Zara he and Luke implicated her because they needed a fall guy. Milo reluctantly gives her the number of who recruited him, which she passes to MI5. They provide her with new identity documents and 24 hours to leave the UK. Zara successfully swaps her cold wallet with a decoy, convincing Haley its wiped when she tries to access it. Sniper kills Junior and takes Luke, and the rest of London's team flees. The fingerprint identifies Sniper as Morgan Trahern, but Covaci and Lloyd arrive at the safehouse after MI5 have raided it. Covaci is suspended. Zara is confronted by Sniper at her flat.
6	Dead Cat Bounce	Hettie Macdonald	Sotiris Nikitas	21 January 2026
Sniper takes Zara's cold wallet and steals Milo's after killing him. After obtaining Milo's access codes at the Lochmill offices, Luke and Zara fight Sniper when he prepares to kill them. Covaci intervenes to save Zara, but is injured when London's team arrives. Zara discovers they don't know who hired them. Luke escapes when Sniper kills his former colleagues. Using Covaci's Taser, Zara is able to kill the injured Sniper, but he implicates the police before dying. The £4 billion is returned to Lochmill Capital after passing through dozens of public figures' accounts, implicating them in using tax havens. Milo is named as the mastermind in the press, with Zara and Luke giving their cold wallets to MI5 to avoid prison and they resign from Lochmill Capital to start a new life. Covaci is fired, and sells his house to pay his debts. He deduces Yoshida, a radical former financier now disillusioned with the wealth system, was behind the operation. They turn down £10 million from him to keep quiet, but Zara reveals she kept a hold of Milo's cold wallet, containing £20 million, for them to share instead.

== Production ==
The series was developed by Drama Republic and created by Nikias, who had previously written thrillers under the pen name Ray Celestin. Sam Miller produced, and directed three episodes. The cast is led by Sophie Turner, Archie Madekwe and Jacob Fortune-Lloyd, and also includes Yusra Warsama, Andrew Howard, Jonathan Slinger and Andrew Koji.

Filming began in London in May 2024.

== Release ==
All six episodes were made available on 21 January 2026 on Prime Video.

== Reception ==
The series holds a 79% approval rating on review aggregator Rotten Tomatoes, based on 33 critic reviews. The website's critics consensus reads, "Gripping with few narrative gripes, Steal invests in thrilling heist entertainment with stirring performances by Sophie Turner and Archie Madekwe to rousing effect." Metacritic, which uses a weighted average, assigned a score of 64 out of 100 based on 12 critics, indicating "generally favorable" reviews. Lucy Mangan of The Guardian awarded the series four stars out of five, praising the cast and writing. Anita Singh in The Telegraph also gave it four out five stars. Aramide Tinubu of Variety dubbed the series "an intense watch" and "'Steal' works well because of Turner's fantastic performance. At the core of the series is an unimaginable conspiracy that upends the whole British financial ecosystem. However, the unsettling nail-biter is really about the discontent bubbling just below the surface of society and the extreme things human beings are willing to do to give themselves a chance at the lives they think they deserve."

Angie Han of The Hollywood Reporter was more critical, praising the opening episode as "a pretty slick little thriller" but that "the next five episodes struggle to keep up the momentum. Doing somehow both too much and too little, Steal keeps asking questions past the point where I'd stopped caring about the answers."
