= Frank Mitchell (prisoner) =

English criminal and friend of the Kray twins

Frank Samuel Mitchell (c. 1929 – 24 December 1966 [possible]), also known as "The Mad Axeman", was an English criminal and friend of the Kray twins who was later murdered at their behest.

== Biography ==
=== Early life and prison ===
Mitchell was one of seven children born into a working-class family from Limehouse, East London. At the age of nine he stole a bicycle from another child, for which he was taken before a juvenile court and put on probation. As an adult, Mitchell possessed great physical strength and liked to demonstrate it by lifting a grand piano off the floor or picking up two full-grown men, one in each hand. He also had a short temper and, according to Martin Fido, "the mind of a child of 13 or under". From the age of 17 Mitchell was regularly incarcerated in borstals and prisons, mostly for shop-breaking and larceny. During a brief spell of freedom, he fathered a daughter with a girlfriend, but never knew about her.

In prison, Mitchell was "a thorn in the flesh of authority". His prison terms were characterised by violence against guards and fellow inmates, and he was punished with the birch and the cat o' nine tails. He was one of the ringleaders in a riot at Rochester borstal. He slashed a guard across the face, and was charged with attempted murder after attacking an inmate he believed had informed on him. He was later acquitted. In 1955 he was diagnosed "mentally defective" and sent to the Rampton psychiatric hospital. Two years later Mitchell escaped with another inmate, and they attacked a man with an iron bar before stealing his clothes and money. When he was recaptured Mitchell attacked police with two meat cleavers, and was sent to Broadmoor. He escaped again, broke into a private home and held a married couple hostage with an axe, for which he was nicknamed "The Mad Axeman" in the press. In October 1958 he was sentenced to life imprisonment for robbery with violence.

Mitchell was sent to Dartmoor prison in 1962, and whilst there his behaviour improved. He kept budgerigars and was transferred to the honour party, a small group of trustees who were allowed to work outside the prison walls with minimal supervision. Mitchell was permitted to roam the moors and feed the wild ponies and even visited nearby pubs. On one occasion he caught a taxi to Okehampton to buy a budgerigar. The governor of the prison promised Mitchell that if he stayed out of trouble he would recommend to the Home Office that he be given a release date. Four years later, Mitchell was aggrieved that he had still not received one.

=== The Krays and escape from Dartmoor ===
Mitchell befriended Ronnie Kray when they served a sentence together at Wandsworth prison in the 1950s. During Mitchell's trial for attempted murder, Ron hired a lawyer for him and paid for him to have a new suit fitted. Ron was keen on breaking Mitchell out of prison, thinking it would help him to publicise his grievance and earn a release date, as well as enhance the Krays' standing in the underworld. Reg Kray recalled that he was reluctant, but finally reasoned that "if nothing else it would stick two fingers up to the law". Reg visited Mitchell at Dartmoor in disguise and informed him of the plan. On 12 December 1966, while with a small work party on the moors, Mitchell asked the sole guard for permission to feed some nearby Dartmoor ponies. His request was granted, he walked over to a quiet road where a getaway car containing associates of the Krays – Albert Donoghue, "Mad" Teddy Smith and Billy Exley – were waiting for him, and they drove to London, where the Krays put him up in a flat in Barking Road, East Ham. It was over five hours before Mitchell was reported missing.

Mitchell's escape made national news, led to a political storm over the lax security around a man described in the press as "Britain's most violent convict", and was debated in the House of Commons. A large manhunt ensued, with 200 policemen, 100 Royal Marines and a Royal Air Force helicopter searching the moors. With the aid of Teddy Smith, Mitchell wrote to national newspapers and his plea to be granted a release date was printed in The Times and the Daily Mirror. However, Home Secretary Roy Jenkins was not willing to negotiate with an escaped criminal and would not review his status until he was back in custody.

Mitchell soon became a problem for the Krays. Owing to his physical strength and short temper, he was difficult to control. He was unwilling to give himself up and return to prison, and was not allowed to leave the flat in case he was recognised. The Krays feared releasing him or turning him in as he could implicate them in his escape. Mitchell felt insulted that Ron had not visited him at all and Reg had only visited him once and was particularly upset that he could not visit his parents, despite them living nearby. He grew increasingly agitated and began making threats against the Krays. To placate him, they brought a woman to the flat: Liza Prescott, a blonde night club hostess, who was known by firm member Tommy Cowley. Mitchell soon became enamoured with her, further complicating the situation. The Krays decided the only solution was to kill him.

=== Death ===
On 24 December 1966 Mitchell was led into the back of a van by Albert Donoghue, thinking he was to be taken to a safe house in the countryside where he would meet up with Ron Kray. There was almost another argument when he realised that Liza would not be coming with him; Donoghue persuaded him that it was safer for her to follow later on. Waiting in the van were several men, among them Freddie Foreman and Alfie Gerrard, who were armed with revolvers. Once the van doors were closed and the engine started, they opened fire on Mitchell, killing him. Donoghue thought that 12 shots were fired before Mitchell died. His body was never recovered. Foreman later revealed that Mitchell's body was bound with chicken wire, weighted down and dumped in the English Channel. Reg Kray cited springing Mitchell from prison as one of his biggest mistakes. In the 1988 book Our Story, written with his brother and Fred Dinenage, Ron Kray claimed that Mitchell was never murdered but was smuggled out of Britain with the Krays' help. He says that both Donoghue and Dickson's accounts are fabricated, citing drastic inconsistencies between their stories. He also cites the fact that both he and Reg had admitted to the murders of George Cornell and Jack McVitie, as well as numerous other crimes, in the same book as reason to support his account of what happened. As Frank Mitchell was never found, alive or dead, neither claim can be proven true or false.

== Aftermath ==
In 1968, the Krays and various accomplices were arrested and put on trial for an array of offences, including the murders of George Cornell, Jack McVitie and Frank Mitchell. Their attempt to cajole gang member Albert Donoghue into confessing to killing Mitchell led to him becoming a crown witness and testifying against them. Ron, Reg and Charlie Kray and Freddie Foreman were all acquitted of Mitchell's murder, due to lack of evidence and the perceived unreliability of Donoghue's testimony. Reg Kray was found guilty of conspiring to effect Mitchell's escape from Dartmoor, for which he received a five-year sentence to run concurrently with his other sentences. Donoghue and another Firm member, John Dickson, pleaded guilty to harbouring Mitchell and respectively received 18-month and nine-month sentences.

In his 1996 autobiography Respect, Foreman admitted to shooting Mitchell as a favour to the Krays; Donoghue said Foreman was paid £1,000 for it. Foreman was arrested and questioned by police after repeating his confession in a 2000 television documentary, but the Crown Prosecution Service announced that it would not be re-opening the case, due to the then extant double jeopardy law.

Mitchell's escape, confinement and subsequent murder were the subject of the 2019 film The Krays' Mad Axeman, in which Mitchell was portrayed by Diarmaid Murtagh.
