= Diarmaid Murtagh =

Irish actor

Diarmaid Murtagh (born 28 July 1982) is an Irish actor. He portrayed Leif in the 2013 historical drama television series Vikings, Dimitri in Dracula Untold (2014) and Captain Harpen in The Monuments Men (2014).

== Early life ==
Murtagh was born on 28 July 1982 in Kingscourt, Ireland.

== Career ==
Murtagh first appeared in the 2007 Irish soap opera Ros na Rún. His debut film role was as Captain Harpen in the George Clooney's 2014 war film The Monuments Men. Murtagh played convict Frank Mitchell in the 2019 film The Krays' Mad Axeman, and played a Master Builder from Altdorf in the 2024 film William Tell.

He appeared in Troy: Fall of a City as Hermes, messenger of Olympus. He is currently featured as “Connor” in the Netflix science fiction drama The One.
