= Rhys Frake-Waterfield =

British filmmaker

- Frake-Waterfield in 2023
- Born: June 28, 1991 (age 35)
- Education: University of Essex
- Occupations: Director; producer; writer; editor
- Notable work: The Killing Tree; Winnie-the-Pooh: Blood and Honey; Winnie-the-Pooh: Blood and Honey 2

Rhys Frake-Waterfield (born June 28, 1993) is an English filmmaker who became known for his 2023 independent slasher film Winnie-the-Pooh: Blood and Honey and its 2024 sequel. It was the first theatrical film of his career, as well as the first for his company Jagged Edge Productions.

== Life and career ==
Frake-Waterfield is from Essex, where he also studied at the University of Essex.

In 2021, Frake-Waterfield left his corporate strategy job at EDF Energy to create low-budget horror films, all released direct-to-video. After entering the film industry, he produced 36 feature films in two years. Though Frake-Waterfield started out as a visual effects artist, over time, he got into directing. The first film he directed was The Area 51 Incident, following a group of survivors at Area 51 who take shelter underground following an incident involving aliens emerging from a wormhole.

On 1 January 2022, the 1926 Winnie-the-Pooh book entered the public domain in the United States. Shortly after this, Jagged Edge Productions announced a Winnie-the-Pooh-based slasher film called Winnie-the-Pooh: Blood and Honey, with Frake-Waterfield serving as the director, writer, and co-producer with Scott Jeffrey. Though the film was originally intended for a direct-to-video release in October 2022, it developed an increased popularity on the internet which eventually led to the film receiving a theatrical release. There was much controversy among both the general public and Winnie-the-Pooh fans, with Frake-Waterfield claiming that he and the other members on the film's production received death threats and petitions calling for the film to be cancelled, but the film was released in cinemas in the United States on 15 February 2023, receiving very poor reviews. The film made over US$7.7 million on a budget reported to be less than US$50,000. Afterwards, Frake-Waterfield created a sequel with a budget five times greater, along with a cinematic universe called The Twisted Childhood Universe with horror films based on Bambi, a Life in the Woods, Peter Pan and The Adventures of Pinocchio. He has also expressed interest in making films about Thor, as well as copyrighted franchises such as Teletubbies, Teenage Mutant Ninja Turtles and Cartoon Network's The Powerpuff Girls in the future.

Frake-Waterfield is also the owner of Dark Abyss Productions, where he writes, directs and produces films under the name Tyler James (with Scott Jeffrey). Films he has directed under this banner include The Loch Ness Horror, Sky Monster, Dinosaur Prison, Deadly Waters and Monsternado. Films he has produced under this banner include Three Blind Mice, Mary Had a Little Lamb, Snake Hotel, Alien Invasion, Return of Punch and Judy, and Medusa's Venom.

== Selected filmography ==
Year	Title	Director	Writer	Producer	Editor	Notes	Ref.
2021	Curse of Bloody Mary	No	No	Yes	Yes		
2021	Easter Killing	No	No	Yes	Yes		
2022	The Area 51 Incident	Yes	Yes	Yes	Yes	Also composer	
2022	The Killing Tree	Yes	No	Executive	Yes	Also decorations	
2023	Firenado	Yes	Yes	Yes	No	Co-directed with Scott Jeffrey	
2023	Winnie-the-Pooh: Blood and Honey	Yes	Yes	Yes	Yes		
2024	Winnie-the-Pooh: Blood and Honey 2	Yes	Story	Yes	Yes		
2026	Pinocchio Unstrung	Yes	Yes	Yes	Yes	Co-edited with Dan Allen	

=== Producer only ===
Year	Title	Ref.
2021	Dinosaur Hotel	
2021	Dragon Fury	
2021	The Legend of Jack and Jill	
2021	Monsters of War	
2021	Spider in the Attic	
2022	H.P. Lovecraft's Monster Portal	
2022	Looks Can Kill	
2022	Wrath of Van Helsing	
2022	Croc!	
2022	Shockwaves	
2022	Kingdom of the Dinosaurs	
2022	Jack Frost	
2022	Pterodactyl	
2022	Dinosaur Hotel 2	
2022	Dragon Fury: Wrath of Fire	
2022	Krampus: The Return	
2022	Bloody Mary Returns	
2022	Mega Lightning	
2022	Easter Bunny Massacre: The Bloody Trail	
2025	Peter Pan's Neverland Nightmare	
2025	Bambi: The Reckoning	
2027	Winnie-the-Pooh: Blood and Honey 3 – The Lost Years	

== Awards ==
Year	Award	Category	Nominated work	Result	Ref.
2024	Golden Raspberry Awards	Worst Picture	Winnie-the-Pooh: Blood and Honey	Won	
2024	Golden Raspberry Awards	Worst Director	Winnie-the-Pooh: Blood and Honey	Won	
2024	Golden Raspberry Awards	Worst Screenplay	Winnie-the-Pooh: Blood and Honey	Won	
