= Safiyya Ingar =

British actor, and voice actor

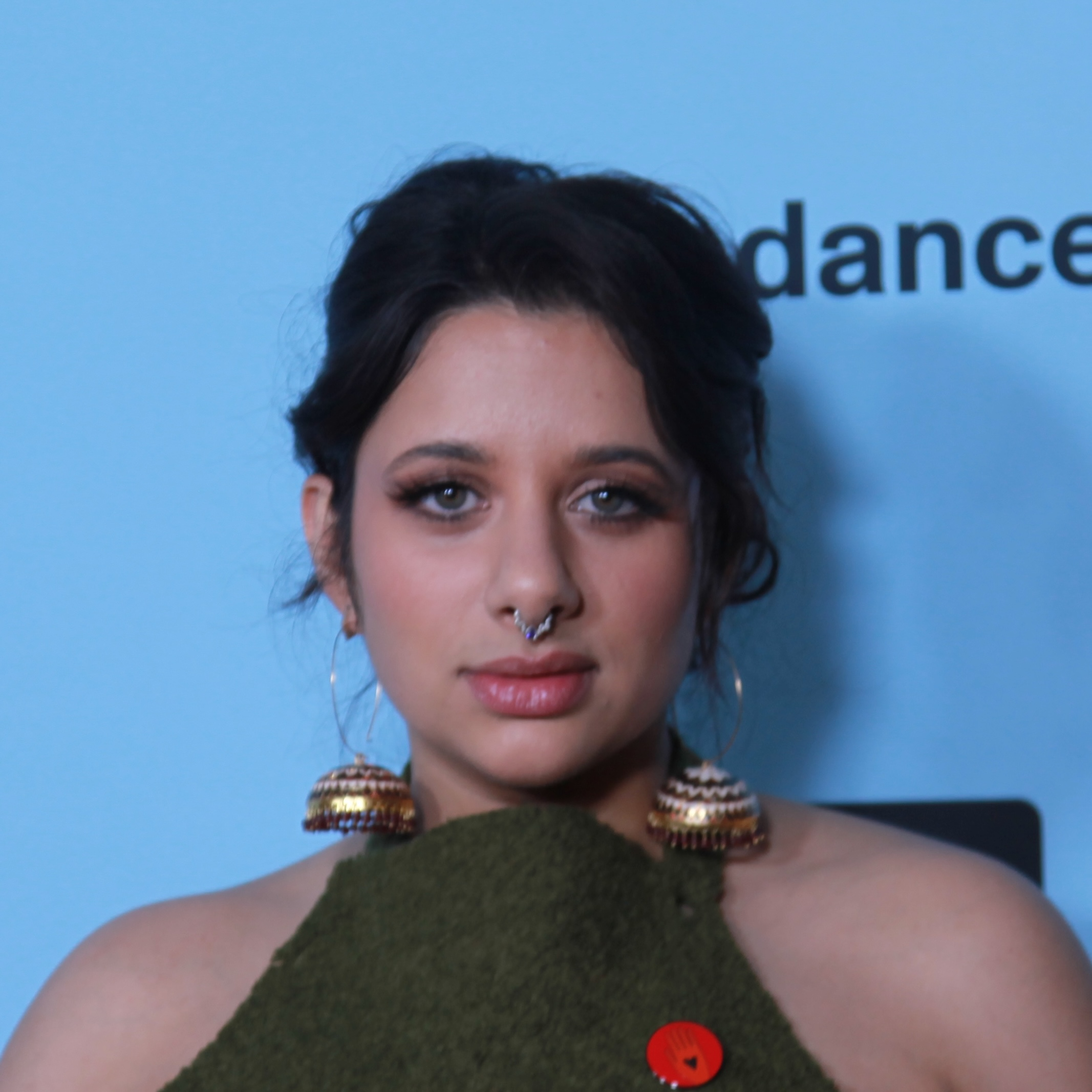
- Ingar at the 2025 Sundance Film Festival
- Born: 1996 (age 29–30)
- Education: ArtsEd
- Occupations: Actor, voiceover artist, writer
- Years active: 2017–present
- Height: 5 ft 3 in (160 cm)

Safiyya Ingar is a British actor, voiceover artist, and writer. Their (Note: Ingar is non-binary and uses the pronouns they/she. This article uses they/them for consistency.) films include Layla (2024) and Brides (2025). On television, they appeared in the BBC Two miniseries Summer of Rockets (2019) and the Netflix series The Witcher (2023).

Ingar voiced companion Valarie Lockwood in The Eleventh Doctor Chronicles audio series for Big Finish Productions alongside Jacob Dudman as the Eleventh Doctor.

== Early life ==
Ingar was born in 1996 to an Indian Muslim family and brought up in an East London flat with six siblings. Ingar attended Leyton Sixth Form College and went on to study at Arts Educational School (ArtsEd).

== Filmography ==
Ingar talking about their work on the video game Dustborn

=== Film ===
Year	Title	Role	Notes
2017	Inappropriate Behaviour	Mandy	Short film
2022	What's Love Got to Do with It?	Girl	
2024	Layla	Princy	
TBA	Brides	Muna	
TBA	Faith	Samira	

=== Television ===
Year	Title	Role	Notes	Ref.
2019	Summer of Rockets	Shirley	Miniseries, 5 episodes	
2021	Doctors	Nadira Shahbazi	Episode: "It Takes You Away"	
2023	The Witcher	Keira Metz	4 episodes (season 3); season 4	

=== Video games ===
Year	Title	Role	Notes	Ref.
2019	Another Eden	Elga	English version	
2022	Valkyrie Elysium	Taika	English version	
2023	Diablo IV	Additional voices		
2024	Dustborn	Sai		
2024	Wuthering Waves	Abby	English version	
2026	Luna Abyss	Fawkes	English version	
2026	The Incident at Galley House	Reya Beckon		

== Stage ==
Year	Title	Role	Notes	Ref.
2017	Growth	Various	Paines Plough tour	
2017	The Box of Delights	Maria Jones	Wilton's Music Hall, London	
2018	Holes	Magnet	Nottingham Playhouse, Nottingham	
2018	Lava	Rach	Nottingham Playhouse, Nottingham	
2019	Hobson's Choice	Ruby Hobson	Royal Exchange, Manchester	
2019	The Canterville Ghost	Virginia Otis	Unicorn Theatre, London	
2021	Marvin's Binoculars	Sita	Unicorn Theatre, London	
2021	The Child in the Snow	Hester Thornton	Wilton's Music Hall, London	
2022	Two Billion Beats	Asha	Orange Tree Theatre, Richmond	

== Audio ==
Year	Title	Role	Notes
2021	Inexplicables	Shuhela Begum	Neon Inkwell
2022	Torchwood: The Black Knight and Death in Venice	Lynne Sharman / Elena	Big Finish Productions
2022–2024	Doctor Who: The Eleventh Doctor Chronicles (multiple boxed sets)	Valarie Lockwood	Big Finish Productions
2022	The War Master: Escape From Reality	Hobgoblin	Big Finish Productions
2023	Doctor Who - Short Trips: The Galois Group	Valarie Lockwood	Big Finish Productions
2025	Irwin Allen's the Time Tunnel	MB	Podcast series
