= The Krays' Mad Axeman =

- Directed by: William Kerley
- Written by: Gill Adams; Rebecca Long
- Produced by: Rebecca Long
- Starring: Diarmaid Murtagh; Morgan Watkins; Elen Rhys
- Production company: Fugitive Films
- Release date: 2019
- Running time: 102 minutes
- Country: United Kingdom
- Language: English

The Krays' Mad Axeman (also known as: The London Mob) is a 2019 film directed by William Kerley and starring Diarmaid Murtagh, Morgan Watkins and Elen Rhys. It is based on the play Jump to Cow Heaven by Gill Adams, itself based on the true story of Frank Mitchell, a convict and associate of the Kray Twins, who facilitated Mitchell's escape from prison in 1966 and are presumed to have ordered his murder later that year.

== Plot ==
In December 1966, Frank Mitchell escapes from Dartmoor prison with help from the Kray twins. A nationwide manhunt ensues and Mitchell finds himself holed up in a flat in East London with only his minder John for company. Frank is menacing, physically powerful and short-tempered. Unable to leave due to the ongoing manhunt, he grows increasingly frustrated and John struggles to control him.

To placate Mitchell, the Krays send over a hostess named Lisa, and she and Frank sleep together repeatedly over the next few days. Frank falls in love with her. Lisa is told she will not be able to leave either, as she has seen Frank and could identify him to the police. To calm matters, Reggie Kray also visits. However, it is clear that Frank is becoming a liability to the Krays. Frank, John and Lisa share a final Christmas Eve dinner together.

On Christmas day, Frank is led into the back of a van, thinking he will be heading to the countryside to meet up with the Krays. Instead, several men shoot him dead.
