= The Goat, or Who Is Sylvia? =

Play written by Edward Albee in 2000

- Book cover (Methuen)
- Original language: English
- Written by: Edward Albee
- Characters: Martin; Stevie; Billy; Ross
- Genre: Drama
- Setting: Drama

Premiere
- Date: March 10, 2002
- Place: John Golden Theatre

The Goat, or Who Is Sylvia? is a full-length play written in 2000 by Edward Albee which opened on Broadway in 2002. It won the 2002 Tony Award for Best Play, the 2002 Drama Desk Award for Outstanding Play, and was a finalist for the 2003 Pulitzer Prize for Drama. The play transferred to London in 2004 and received nominations for Best Play at the 2005 Oliver Awards and the 2005 Critic's Choice Awards.

== Overview ==
The tale of a married, middle-aged architect, Martin, his wife Stevie, and their son Billy, whose lives crumble when Martin falls in love with a goat, the play focuses on the limits of an ostensibly liberal society. Through showing this family in crisis, Albee challenges audience members to question their own moral judgment of social taboos.

The play also features many language games and grammatical arguments in the middle of catastrophes and existential disputes between the characters. The name of the play refers to the song "Who Is Silvia?" from Shakespeare's play The Two Gentlemen of Verona. Proteus sings this song, hoping to woo Silvia. It is also referred to in Finding the Sun (1982), an earlier work of Albee.

== Cast and characters ==
- Stevie Gray: the wife of Martin who, until Sylvia, had been his one and only love
- Martin Gray: a 50-year-old award-winning architect who falls in love with a goat
- Billy Gray: Stevie and Martin's gay, emotionally sensitive, 17-year-old son
- Ross Tuttle: a family friend and host of a television program

== Notable productions ==
Characters	Broadway debut	West End debut	West End Revival
Characters	2002	2004	2017
Stevie Gray	Mercedes Ruehl	Kate Fahy	Sophie Okonedo
Martin Gray	Bill Pullman	Jonathan Pryce	Damian Lewis
Billy Gray	Jeffrey Carlson	Eddie Redmayne	Archie Madekwe
Ross Tuttle	Stephen Rowe	Matthew Marsh	Jason Hughes

== Plot ==
=== Scene 1 ===
It's Martin's 50th birthday. In his suburban living room, he and his wife Stevie prepare to be interviewed on television by their friend Ross. Martin seems distracted and cannot remember anything. Stevie casually asks Martin about a woman's business card in his pocket and his odd scent. Martin denies having an affair with a woman, but confesses to falling in love with a goat named Sylvia. Stevie laughs it off, thinking it is a joke. Stevie leaves when Ross arrives. Ross begins interviewing Martin, congratulating him for being the youngest man ever to win the Pritzker Prize and recently being chosen to design a multi-billion-dollar city. However, Ross soon becomes frustrated with Martin’s inability to concentrate on the interview. Martin confides that the reason for his absent-mindedness is his affair with Sylvia, which began during his search for a country home. Amazed that Martin could fall in love with anyone but Stevie, Ross asks repeatedly, "Who is Sylvia?" Martin reveals a photo of Sylvia and Ross screams that Sylvia is a goat.

=== Scene 2 ===
Ross has written Stevie a letter regarding Martin's affair and Sylvia's identity. Stevie confronts Martin about this, with their son Billy also in the room. Billy is shocked and flees (throughout this scene, he enters and exits sporadically). Stevie recounts the normalcy of her life before she opened Ross's letter. She realizes that Martin was telling the truth in Scene 1 and that she was right to worry about the business card and the odd scent. The card belongs to a member of a support group for bestiality. Martin claims that people like him seek animal company as a coping mechanism. For him, Sylvia is not just an animal; she has a soul and reciprocates his love. As Martin tries to justify himself, Stevie breaks various objects and overturns furniture. Finally, she exits, vowing revenge.

=== Scene 3 ===
Billy enters the ruined living room where Martin remains. Billy claims that Martin and Stevie are good people and are better than most of his classmates' parents. However, he begins crying once he realizes that Martin's bestiality has torn their once happy family apart beyond repair.

Overwhelmed with a sense of loss and love for his father, Billy embraces Martin and kisses him sexually on the mouth. Martin pushes Billy away just as Ross enters to witness the scene. Martin angrily defends both his son and himself. Ross says he received a call from Stevie saying Martin needed him. Ross and Martin spar over Ross's letter and how Martin's public image can be saved from disgrace.

Stevie then enters, dragging a dead goat. With directions from Ross to the farm where Sylvia was kept, she found and killed the goat, because she could not stand the idea that she and Sylvia loved Martin equally, and were loved as equally by him. The scene and play ends with a tableau as Ross freezes, Stevie remains emotionless, Martin breaks down in tears, and Billy quietly tries to address his parents.

== Tragedy ==
Albee places parentheses around the play's subtitle: "Notes toward a definition of tragedy". The original Greek meaning of the word tragedy is "goat-song". The play maintains Aristotle's six elements of a tragedy in addition to the three unities. The play's resemblance to a Greek tragedy continues as Greek theater is linked to Dionysus. As the god of ritual madness, he inspires ecstasy that frees his followers from fears and subverts hegemony. Bestiality is considered taboo in contemporary society. Martin's relationship with Sylvia thus defies convention. Unlike the other members in the support group, Martin does not understand why bestiality is wrong when he practices it devoid of previous trauma.

On the other hand, Stevie resembles a maenad with her increasingly frenzied actions. The play also alludes to the Eumenides. Before the interview starts, Ross hears "a kind of...rushing sound...wings, or something," to which Martin replies, "It's probably the Eumenides." The noise disappears and Martin corrects himself because "the Eumenides don't stop." The allusion foreshadows Stevie's vow for vengeance, carried out to conclude the play.

The Goat is also a problem play. Albee questions, among other concepts, social morality in relation to taboos, the perception of female identity by contrasting Stevie to Sylvia, and the arbitrary nature of social standards and conventions by juxtaposing Martin's distaste for homosexuality with his bestiality.

== Productions ==
=== Original Broadway production ===
The play premiered on Broadway at the John Golden Theatre on March 10, 2002, and closed on December 15, 2002, after 309 performances and 23 previews. Directed by David Esbjornson, the cast featured Bill Pullman (Martin), Mercedes Ruehl (Stevie), Jeffrey Carlson (Billy), and Stephen Rowe (Ross). On September 13, 2002, Bill Irwin took on the role of Martin, and Sally Field took the role of Stevie. It won the 2002 Tony Award for Best Play while Mercedes Ruehl was nominated for Best Actress in a Play. The play won the 2002 Drama Desk Award for Outstanding Play, and was a finalist for the 2003 Pulitzer Prize for Drama. Critic Charles Isherwood, writing for Variety, described the play as 'unflinching', 'remarkable', and 'perversely funny', while he said that Ruehl played her part with 'captivating wit and ferocity.' Isherwood praised Pullman in particular, stating, "Not for a second does he sell his character’s soul for an easy laugh by betraying the truth of Martin’s feeling. The humanity of this performance is really a marvel to behold." Ben Brantley, writing for the New York Times, felt that the play fell 'short of its high ambitions', with 'too little of the breathless dramatic momentum for which Mr. Albee can usually be relied on.' Brantley had praise for Ruehl, describing her as 'an expert at finding the fierceness in facetiousness'.

=== European Premiere ===
The European premiere took place at Vienna's English Theatre in March to May 2003. Directed by Pam MacKinnon, the cast was Laurence Lau (Martin), Jurian Hughes (Stevie), Howard Nightingall (Ross), and Michael Zlabinger (Billy).

=== Original London production ===
The play ran in the UK at the Almeida Theatre in Islington from 3 February to 13 March 2004 and transferred to the West End at the Apollo Theatre on April 15, 2004, closing on August 7, 2004. Directed by Anthony Page, the cast featured Jonathan Pryce (Martin), Kate Fahy (Stevie), Matthew Marsh (Ross), and Eddie Redmayne (Billy). The production received nominations for Best Play, Best Actor for Jonathan Pryce and Best Actor in a Supporting Role for Eddie Redmayne at the 2005 Olivier Awards. Michael Billington, writing for The Guardian, wrote that 'Albee had boldly defied convention by writing an Oedipus Rex for the affluent society'. Matt Wolf, writing for Variety, expressed that while the characters in the play became 'diminished', it left the audience 'to achieve, as is the way of tragedy, catharsis and come through enhanced.' Billington had particular praise for Pryce, stating, 'I shall long remember from this production is Pryce's pain and bewilderment as he tries to express the tragically inexpressible'. Eddie Redmayne also received acclaim for his portrayal; Paul Taylor described him as 'the most electrically alive person on stage' in The Independent, while Wolf, writing in Variety, described him as a 'blazing young actor, who plays the couple’s 17-year-old gay son, Billy, with such harrowing conviction that the play now seems just as much the kid’s tragedy as mom and dad’s.'

=== Other productions ===
The play was produced in NSW, Australia by the State Theatre of South Australia at the Seymour Centre (Sydney), from April 6 to May 7, 2006. Directed by Marion Potts, the cast featured William Zappa, Victoria Longley, Cameron Goodall and Pip Miller.

The play was produced at TheaterWorks Hartford from April 2 to May 23, 2004, directed by Rob Ruggiero.

The play was produced in Ottawa at the Great Canadian Theatre Company under the direction of Lorne Pardy, October 28 to November 14, 2004. The cast included Stewart Arnott as Martin, Dixie Seatle as Stevie, Peter Mooney as Billy, and Dennis Fitzgerald as Ross.

Another production was at the Mark Taper Forum in Los Angeles in 2005. This production was directed by Warner Shook and starred Brian Kerwin, Cynthia Mace, Patrick J. Adams, and James Eckhouse. The production won several awards, including best production, writing, and lead performance (by Brian Kerwin) from the Los Angeles Drama Critics Circle.

A new production directed by Ian Rickson and starring Damian Lewis, Sophie Okonedo, Jason Hughes and Archie Madekwe opened at the Theatre Royal Haymarket in London's West End, in 2017.

A production by Bulgarian director Javor Gardev, endorsed by Albee, premiered at the Ivan Vazov National Theatre of Bulgaria in 2009. The production received the Award of the Society of the Independent Theatre Critics that year. It remains in the repertoire of the National Theatre.

A new production by Sydney Theatre Company opened at the Ros Packer Theatre, Sydney in March 2023, featuring Claudia Karvan, Yazeed Daher, Nathan Page, and Mark Saturno.

== Awards and nominations ==
The play was a finalist for the 2003 Pulitzer Prize for Drama (won that year by Anna in the Tropics).

=== 2002 Original production ===
Year	Award	Category	Nominated work	Result	Ref.
2002	Tony Awards	Best Play	Edward Albee	Won	
2002	Tony Awards	Best Actress in a Play	Mercedes Ruehl	Nominated	
2002	Drama Desk Awards	Outstanding New Play	Edward Albee	Won	
2002	Drama Desk Awards	Outstanding Actor in a Play	Bill Pullman	Nominated	
2002	Drama Desk Awards	Outstanding Actress in a Play	Mercedes Ruehl	Nominated	
2003	Pulitzer Prize	Pulitzer Prize for Drama	Edward Albee	Finalist	

=== 2004 Original London production ===
Year	Award	Category	Nominated work	Result	Ref.
2005	Laurence Olivier Awards	Best Performance in a Supporting Role	Eddie Redmayne	Nominated	
2005	Laurence Olivier Awards	Best New Play	Edward Albee	Nominated	
2005	Laurence Olivier Awards	Best Actor	Jonathan Pryce	Nominated	
2005	Critic's Circle Theatre Awards	Most Promising Newcomer	Eddie Redmayne	Won	
2004	Evening Standard Theatre Awards	The Milton Shulman Award for Outstanding Newcomer	Eddie Redmayne	Won	
2004	Evening Standard Theatre Awards	Best Play	Edward Albee	Nominated	

=== 2006 Australian production ===
Year	Award	Category	Nominated work	Result	Ref.
2006	Helpmann Award	Best Play	Edward Albee	Won	
