= Nadia Fall =

British playwright and director

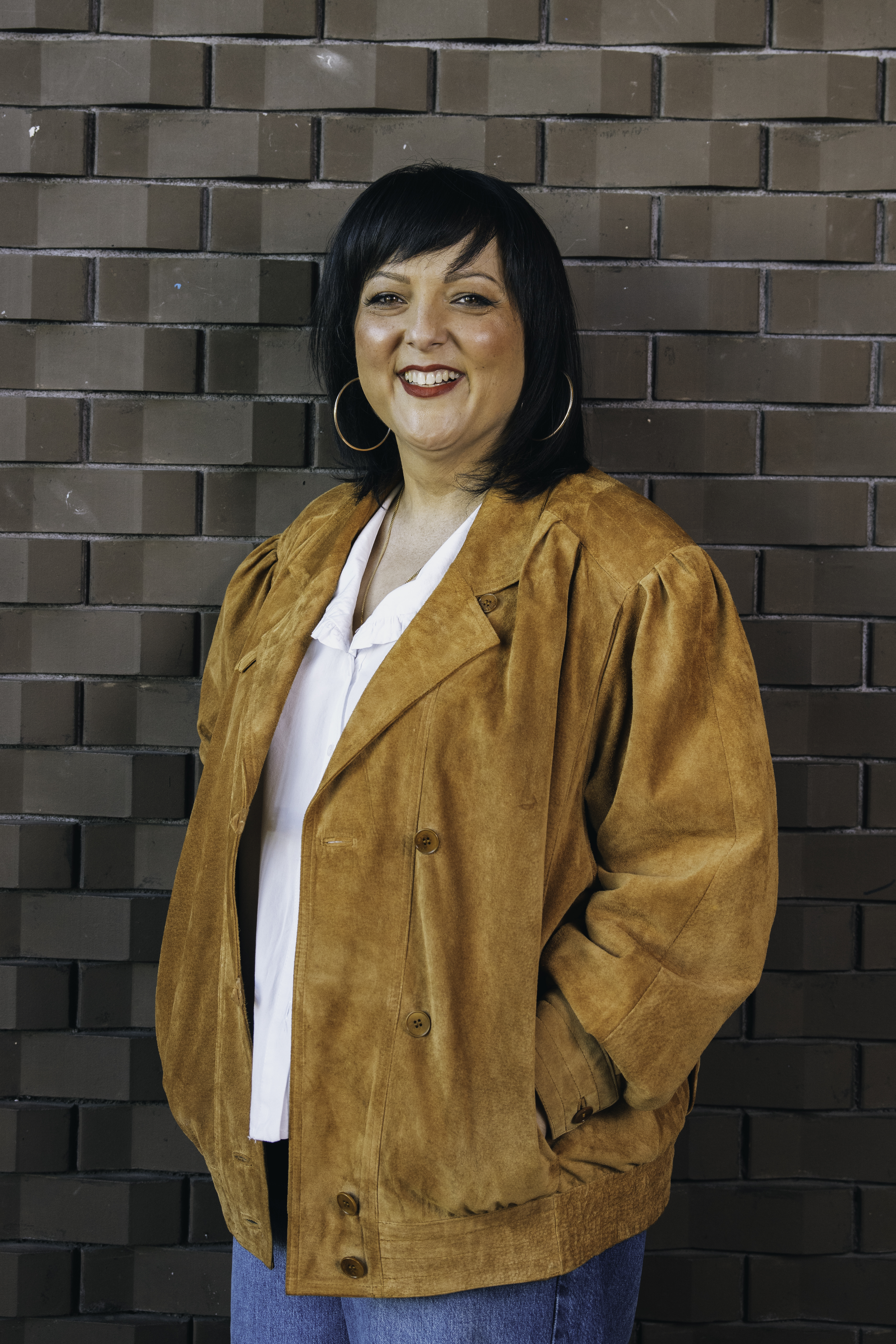
Nadia Fall

Nadia Shehzi Fall OBE is a playwright and theatre and film director. From 2025, she is the artistic director and joint-chief executive of the Young Vic Theatre.

== Early years and education ==
Fall was born to Indian parents in Southwark, London and raised in and around London as well as in the Middle East. She trained in directing at Goldsmiths College, University of London and on the National Theatre Studio’s directors programme.

== Career ==
=== Theatre ===
As a theatre director at the Royal National Theatre her plays included directing The Doctor’s Dilemma in 2012. and writing and directing Home in 2013. She also directed Chewing Gum Dreams by Michaela Coel and Inua Ellams’ adaptation of Three Sisters. She was an associate at the National between 2015 and 2018. She also worked with London's Hampstead Theatre and Bush Theatre, where she directed Taylor Mac's Hir.

She joined Theatre Royal Stratford East as artistic director in 2017. The productions she directed at Stratford East include August Wilson’s King Hedley II starring Sir Lenny Henry and a large-scale production of Noye's Fludde in collaboration with the English National Opera, which won the Olivier Award for Outstanding Achievement in Opera. Her programming highlights included a hit revival of Equus, which received three 2020 Offies, including Best Production, and later transferred to the West End.

In 2024, she was announced to be succeeding Kwame Kwei-Armah in January 2025 as the artistic director and joint-chief executive of the Young Vic Theatre.

=== Film ===
The world premiere of her debut feature-length film Brides occurred at the 2025 Sundance Film Festival.

== Filmography ==
Year	Title	Role	Notes
2025	Brides	Director	
