= Gina Bramhill =

British actress

- Born: 30 July 1989 (age 37); Eastoft, Lincolnshire, England
- Education: Royal Academy of Dramatic Art
- Occupation: Actress
- Years active: 2009–present

Gina Bramhill (born 30 July 1989) is a British actress.

== Background ==
Gina Bramhill was born in Eastoft, where she grew up on a farm, and was educated at South Axholme Academy and John Leggott College. As a child, she appeared in several school plays. She was trained at the Royal Academy of Dramatic Art. Shortly after graduating she appeared as Bella in the movie Lotus Eaters. In 2012 she got a role as the recurring character Eve Sands in the TV series Being Human. In the same year Bramhill played one of the main roles in the drama pilot The Frontier. In Coronation Street she portrayed the character Jodie Woodward. She got a main role in the movie Pleasure Island, which was shown at the Cannes Film Festival in 2014.

Bramhill also appears on theatre. In 2011 she played the rebellious teenager Annabel in Chicken at the Southwark Playhouse. She was Melody in Bad Jews at the Ustinov Studio in Bath.

== Filmography ==
Short film
Year	Title	Role	Notes
2009	Propane	Venus	Short film
2010	I Do	Emma	Short film
2011	Deleting Emily	Emily	Short film
2011	Cassiel	Faith	Short film
2013	The Followed	Andrea	Short film
2016	Padlock	Good Julie	Short film
2018	Okay, Mum	Nadia	Short film

Film
Year	Title	Role	Notes
2010	Made in Dagenham	Hopkins' Secretary	
2011	Lotus Eaters	Bella	
2012	Red Lights	Judi Cale	
2012	The Wedding Video	Konstantin's Interpreter	
2014	Waiting for Dawn	Elizabeth	
2015	Pleasure Island	Jess	
2015	Chicken	Tara	
2017	A Prominent Patient	Lady Annie Higgins	
2023	Northern Comfort	Liz	

Television
Year	Title	Role	Notes
2009	Victoria Wood's Mid Life Christmas	Araminty Finch	TV movie
2009	Victoria Wood: What Larks! Or... What I Did on My Holidays	Araminty Finch/Herself	TV short documentary
2010	Pete Versus Life	Mexico	TV series, episode 'Fankoo'
2011	Without You	Gemma	TV mini-series, episode '1.1-1.3'
2012	The Frontier	Emily	TV movie
2012	Coronation Street	Jodie Woodward	Soap opera, episode '1.7806-1.7809'
2012	Being Human	Eve Sands	TV series, 6 episodes
2014	Mr Selfridge	Susie Spender	TV series, episodes 2.1 - 2.2
2014	Endeavour	Gloria Deeks	TV series, episode 'Sway'
2016	Father Brown	Marianne Delacroix	Episode 4.5 'The Daughter of Autolycus'
2016	The Increasingly Poor Decisions of Todd Margaret	Rachel Purity	TV series, 5 episodes
2016	The Living and the Dead	Alice Wharton	TV mini series, episode 1.4
2016	Brief Encounters	Lisa	TV series, episode 1.1 -1.6
2017	Sherlock	Faith Smith	TV series, episode 'The Lying Detective'
2017	Black Mirror	Coach	TV series, episode 'Hang the DJ'
2019	Dark Money	Leti Anderson	TV mini series, episode 1.2
2019	Frayed	Mae	TV series, 2 episodes
2020	Father Brown	Marianne Delacroix	Episode 8.5 'The Folly Of Jephthah'
2020	Us	Young Connie	4 episodes
2020	Agatha and the Midnight Murders	Grace Nicory	TV movie
2022	Kate & Koji	Mika	TV series, 1 episode
2022	Silent Witness	Fiona Mashaba	TV series, 5 episodes
2022	Avenue 5	Colette	TV series, 1 episode
2022	The Flatshare	Rachel	British TV series
2026	Beyond Paradise	Amelia	TV series, 3 episodes, 4.2-4.4
