= Archie Madekwe =

British actor

- Born: Lambeth, London, England
- Education: LAMDA, BRIT School
- Occupation: Actor
- Years active: 2014–present
- Relatives: Ashley Madekwe (cousin)

Archie Madekwe (/məˈdɛkweɪ/) is an English actor. On television, he is known for his role in the Apple TV+ series See (2019–2022). His films include Midsommar (2019), Gran Turismo and Saltburn (both 2023).

== Early life and education ==
Archie Madekwe was born in South London. His cousin is actress Ashley Madekwe. He is of English, Nigerian, and Swiss descent.

At 14, Madekwe began attending the BRIT School. He also joined the National Youth Theatre. He furthered his studies at the London Academy of Music and Dramatic Art (LAMDA), and left early when he was cast in The Goat, or Who Is Sylvia? in the West End. He said of this experience: "I learned more doing that job than anything else I’ve ever done".

== Career ==
Madekwe made his television debut in 2014 with a guest appearance in an episode of the BBC medical drama Casualty. He then portrayed Luca in two episodes of the Channel 4 comedy-drama Fresh Meat in 2016.

In 2017, Madekwe made his West End debut in The Goat, or Who Is Sylvia? at the Theatre Royal Haymarket alongside Damian Lewis and Sophie Okonedo. He landed his first named film role as Luke in Teen Spirit after the casting director saw him in the play. That year he was named a Screen International ‘Star of Tomorrow’. The same year he also appeared in the Channel 4 sitcom Hang Ups.

In 2019, Madekwe began starring as Kofun in the Apple TV+ science fiction series See, played Courfeyrac in the BBC One adaptation of Les Misérables, and starred as Simon in Ari Aster's A24 folk horror film Midsommar. In 2021, he appeared in the film Voyagers alongside Colin Farrell and Lily-Rose Depp and voiced Sedgwick in the Emmy winning "Ice" installment of the Netflix animated anthology series Love, Death & Robots.

In 2023, Madekwe starred in Neill Blomkamp's sports film based on a true story, Gran Turismo. He also appeared in both Heart of Stone for Netflix and had a leading role in Emerald Fennell's Saltburn.

In 2025, Madekwe starred in Alex Russel’s debut, Lurker. The role gained him his first BAFTA Film Award nomination for the EE Rising Star Award and his first Film Independent Spirit Award nomination for Best Supporting Actor.

In 2026 Madekwe appeared in the series Steal.

In 2026, Madekwe starred in Simon Stone’s adaptation of The Oresteia at The Bridge Theatre.

== Filmography ==
Key
†	Denotes works that have not yet been released

=== Film ===
Year	Title	Role	Notes
2018	Teen Spirit	Luke	
2019	Midsommar	Simon	
2021	Voyagers	Kai	
2023	Gran Turismo	Jann Mardenborough	
2023	Heart of Stone	Ivo	
2023	Beau Is Afraid	Laughing Man	
2023	Saltburn	Farleigh Start	
2025	Lurker	Oliver	Also producer
2026	Confessions II	Himself	Short film
TBA	The Arrival †	Raheem	

=== Television ===
Year	Title	Role	Notes
2014	Casualty	Benjamin Mason	Episode: "To Yourself Be True"
2016	Fresh Meat	Luca	2 episodes
2018	Hang Ups	Jackson Bailey	3 episodes
2018	Informer	Eddy	Episode: "The Masterplan"
2019	Les Misérables	Courfeyrac	Miniseries; 3 episodes
2019–2022	See	Kofun	Lead role
2020	Unprecedented	Louis	1 episode
2021	Love, Death & Robots	Sedgwick	Voice role; episode: "Ice"
2026	Steal	Luke Selborn	Lead role

== Stage ==
Year	Title	Role	Notes
2017	The Goat, or Who Is Sylvia?	Billy	Theatre Royal Haymarket, London
2023	Further than the Furthest Thing	Francis	Young Vic, London
2026	The Oresteia	Lorenzo	Bridge Theatre, London

== Accolades ==
List of awards and nominations received by Madekwe
Year	Award	Category	Nominated work	Result	Ref.
2026	British Academy Film Awards	BAFTA Rising Star Award	himself	Nominated	
2026	Film Independent Spirit Awards	Best Supporting Performance	Lurker	Nominated	
