= Midas Man =

2024 British film dramatising the life of Brian Epstein

- Australian theatrical release poster
- Directed by: Joe Stephenson (Note: Original director Jonas Åkerlund left the project after disagreements with producers, and his replacement Sara Sugarman also left the film due to creative differences and scheduling conflicts following production delays.)
- Screenplay by: Brigit Grant; Jonathan Wakeham
- Produced by: Trevor Beattie; Richard Holmes; Jeremy Chatterton; Tom Reeve; Perry Trevers; Billy Dietrich; Jacob Fortune-Lloyd; Steffen Wild; Asaf Nawi; Mark Borkowski; Peter Dunne; Saskia Thomas; Ian Hutchinson; Matthew Helderman; Luke Tayler
- Starring: Jacob Fortune-Lloyd
- Cinematography: Birgit Dierken
- Edited by: Joe Stephenson
- Music by: Alex Baranowski
- Production companies: Studio POW; Trevor Beattie Films
- Distributed by: Signature Entertainment
- Release dates: 30 May 2024 (TJFF); 30 October 2024 (United Kingdom); 22 January 2025 (United States)
- Running time: 112 minutes
- Country: United Kingdom
- Language: English
- Box office: $172,542

Midas Man is a 2024 British biographical film about the life of music entrepreneur Brian Epstein, who managed the Beatles. Based on a screenplay by Brigit Grant and Jonathan Wakeham, the film is directed by Joe Stephenson, after previous directors Sara Sugarman and Jonas Åkerlund moved on from the project. Jacob Fortune-Lloyd stars in the lead role, alongside Darci Shaw, Ed Speleers, Charley Palmer Rothwell, Eddie Marsan and Emily Watson. Blake Richardson, Jonah Lees, Leo Harvey-Elledge, Campbell Wallace and Adam Lawrence play the Beatles.

After starting filming in October 2021, there were various hold-ups until it resumed in 2023, finishing that June. The film premiered at the 32nd Toronto Jewish Film Festival on 30 May 2024.

== Plot ==
In 1961 Liverpool, Brian Epstein is the successful manager of NEMS, his family's record store. Brian gets numerous requests from teenage girls for the German single "My Bonnie" by a Liverpudlian group called the Beatles. Intrigued, Brian goes to the Cavern Club to see the group perform, and is amazed by their hold over the audience, composed mostly of teenagers. Despite his lack of experience in the music industry, Brian offers to become the group's manager, assuring them that his experience selling records gives him insight into the mindset of their target demographic. The group accepts, and Brian convinces them to clean up their image by wearing matching suits and haircuts.

In early 1962, Brian gets the band an audition at Decca Records, but it goes poorly. Decca executive Dick Rowe questions why a man like Brian would give up his comfortable middle-class lifestyle for such a group. Undeterred, Brian brings the audition tape to several other record companies, all of whom turn him down. Eventually, Brian meets with George Martin, head of Parlophone, and convinces him to let the group audition. They perform well, except for drummer Pete Best, whom Martin encourages Brian to replace. With new drummer Ringo Starr, the Beatles' first two singles, "Love Me Do" and "Please Please Me", are hits, and the band becomes nationally famous.

Throughout 1963, Brian signs several other Liverpudlian acts, including Gerry and the Pacemakers, Billy J. Kramer and the Dakotas, Tommy Quickly, and Cilla White, the Cavern’s coat check girl, who changes her name to Cilla Black. Coming home from a performance one night, Brian learns that his parents Harry and Queenie have received a call from a man who robbed Brian during a sexual encounter and is attempting to blackmail him. While his parents want to go to the police, Brian insists he will pay the man off instead, adamant that his sexual orientation not be disclosed to the public. Queenie implores Brian to be more careful, and he reveals that he is moving to London to better manage the Beatles' expanding popularity. As his workload increases, Brian's habit of taking barbiturates and stimulants becomes more pronounced.

In 1964, Brian travels to America to book the Beatles on The Ed Sullivan Show, and meets a struggling actor named Tex Ellington. They spend the night together, and Brian encourages Tex to visit him in London. The Beatles' appearances on Sullivan, coupled with the success of their single "I Want to Hold Your Hand", catapult them to international fame, kicking off a successful but exhausting American tour. Despite his success, Brian is increasingly lonely. He takes Cilla as his date to his brother Clive's wedding, and confides that he thinks his father is ashamed of him; she asks why he doesn't have a special someone in his life.

In 1965, Brian receives a visit from Tex and agrees to manage him, putting him on a £50-per-week retainer. The Beatles' success continues throughout 1966, but a miserable Asian tour followed by a storm of controversy concerning John Lennon's remarks about Jesus convince the band to give up touring. On the night of the group's final concert, Tex, feeling snubbed by Brian, steals his suitcase containing $20,000 and a variety of pills. The betrayal, combined with the end of the Beatles' touring career, causes Brian to suffer a nervous breakdown.

In 1967, the Beatles are invited to perform on Our World, the first global television broadcast; Brian suggests they write a new song with a simple message for a dark world. Harry dies, crushing Brian, and Queenie tells Brian that Harry was proud of him even if he didn't show it. Seeing his brother playing with his daughter at the funeral, Brian becomes sad at the thought of never having his own family; his butler Lonnie insists that he does have a family even if it isn't a traditional one.

Brian attends the broadcast of Our World, where the Beatles warmly greet him. As their performance goes live, Brian's friends and family call to congratulate him. Two months later, Brian dies of an accidental barbiturate overdose at the age of 32.

== Cast ==
- Jacob Fortune-Lloyd as Brian Epstein
- Blake Richardson as Paul McCartney
- Jonah Lees as John Lennon
- Leo Harvey-Elledge as George Harrison
- Campbell Wallace as Ringo Starr
- Adam Lawrence as Pete Best
- Darci Shaw as Cilla White/Black
- Ed Speleers as John "Tex" Ellington
- Charley Palmer Rothwell as George Martin
- Eddie Izzard as Allan Williams
- Milo Parker as Alistair Taylor
- Chukwuma Omambala as Lonnie Trimble
- James Corrigan as Nat Weiss
- Jay Leno as Ed Sullivan
- Eddie Marsan as Harry Epstein
- Emily Watson as Queenie Epstein
- Luke Allen-Gale as Sidney Beecher-Stevens
- Michael Anderson as Lukaz
- Siri Ellis as a Priory doctor
- Shaun Fagan as Bob Wooler
- Jamie Finn as Mike Smith
- Jordan Kelly as Gerry Marsden
- Ethan Steed as Ray Jones
- Alex Macqueen as Dick Rowe
- Alice Merivale as Patricia Davies
- Bill Milner as Clive Epstein
- Alice Audrey O'Hanlon as Freda Kelly
- Jon Rumney as a mohel

== Production ==
=== Development ===
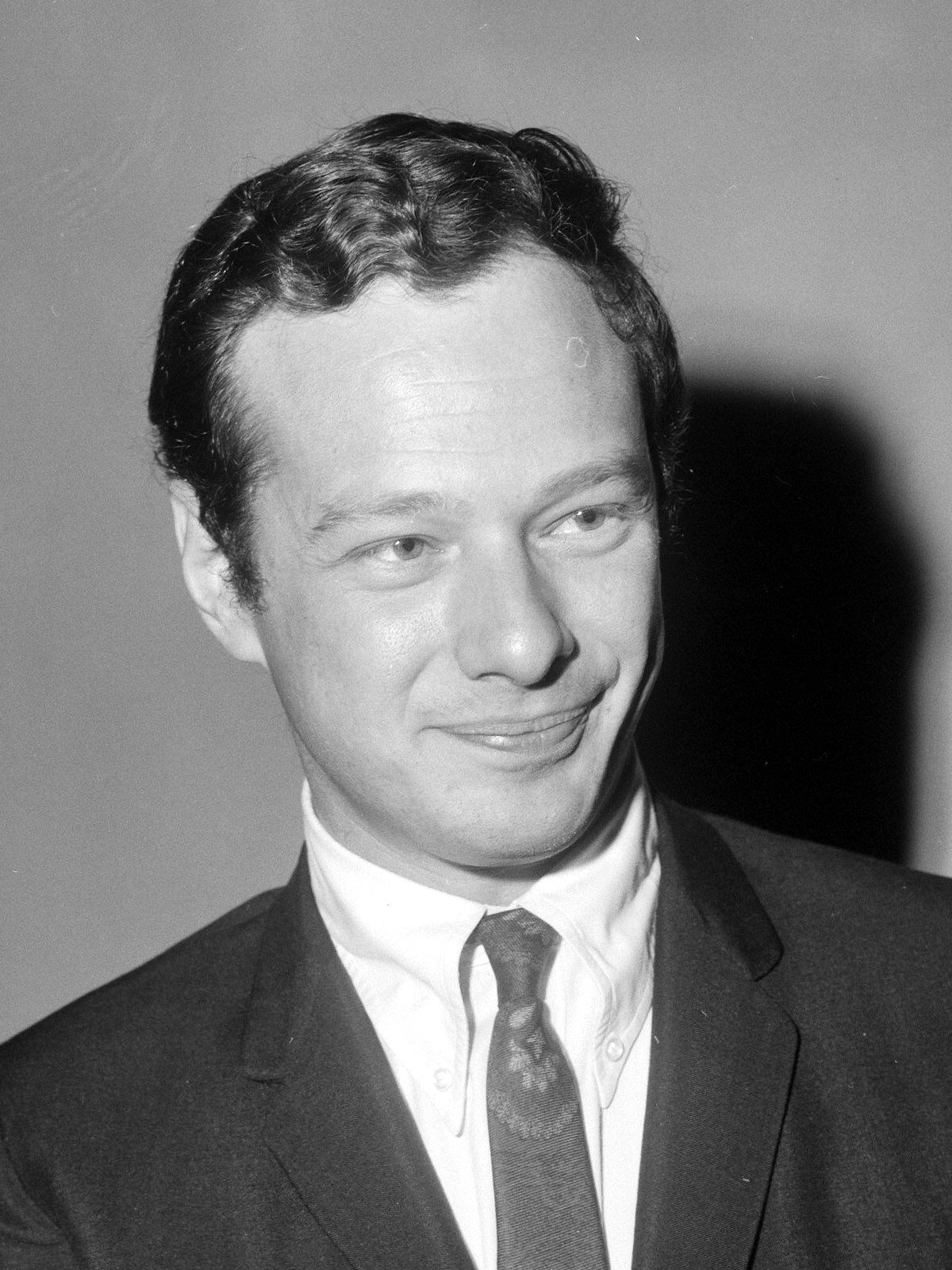
The film is about music entrepreneur Brian Epstein.

Midas Man is a biographical film about Brian Epstein based on a story and screenplay by Brigit Grant. It is a British co-production between Studio POW and Trevor Beattie Films. It is also produced by Er Dong Pictures, who will distribute the film in China. In July 2020, Jonas Åkerlund was announced to direct. In an interview with The Guardian, Åkerlund said he had been researching Epstein for almost two years. He also said he had talked with people who knew Epstein, including Gerry Marsden of Gerry and the Pacemakers: "He told me stories that haven't been printed yet and that we'll introduce into our film." In April 2021, Jacob Fortune-Lloyd was cast in the lead role as Brian Epstein. In July, the film's distribution rights in the UK and Ireland were sold to Signature Entertainment. In the following months, Emily Watson, Eddie Marsan and Omari Douglas were cast in September, and Rosie Day, Lukas Gage, Charley Palmer Rothwell and Bill Milner were cast in October.

=== Filming ===
The planned 12-week shoot began in Liverpool on 11 October 2021. Principal photography, however, was put on hiatus for three weeks after Åkerlund left the production in November. An issued statement made the claim that filming would continue that same month in London and move to Los Angeles, California, in early January. Sara Sugarman was hired as Åkerlund's replacement, with no reshoots expected to take place, and filming scheduled to start again soon. In late November, Jay Leno, Jonah Lees, Blake Richardson, Leo Harvey Elledge, Campbell Wallace and Adam Lawrence joined the cast and a first-look image was released featuring several cast members at Abbey Road Studios. An issued statement said that after a three month break, filming would begin in the US in late January 2022 before returning to the UK.

Filming ended up being on hiatus for over a year, (Note: The prolonged production caused several changes in the cast. The final cast list was obtained from the press kit downloaded from https://www.transmissionfilms.com.au/films/midas-man.) before finally taking place in May 2023 in Blackpool. The following month, it was reported that Joe Stephenson had taken over as director from Sugarman, who reportedly left due to scheduling issues and creative differences. Principal photography was completed by Stephenson. It was also reported that Eddie Izzard, Ed Speleers, Darci Shaw, and Milo Parker had joined the cast; Speleers and Shaw replaced Lukas Gage and Rosie Day, respectively.

== Release ==
On 30 May 2024, Midas Man held its Canadian premier at the 32nd Toronto Jewish Film Festival as the opening night film. Studio POW and American Entertainment Investors sold North American distribution rights to Briarcliff Entertainment. In Australia and New Zealand, Midas Man was distributed by Transmission Films and released on 29 August 2024. In UK and Ireland, Signature Entertainment launched the movie on Amazon Prime Video on 30 October 2024, after a premier event at FACT Liverpool on 29 October 2024. WW Entertainment released the movie in Belgium on 30 October 2024.

In the United States, the film premiered at Miami Jewish Film Festival on 20 January 2025 and subsequently released on Olyn on 22 January 2025, which is an independent streaming service. Menemsha Films posted on their website the film will be shown in selected theaters in the US from 21 March 2025.

== Reception ==
On the review aggregator website Rotten Tomatoes, 81% of 21 critics' reviews are positive, with an average rating of 6.2/10. Metacritic, which uses a weighted average, assigned the film a score of 53 out of 100, based on six critics, indicating "mixed or average" reviews.

The Guardian gave the film 3/5 stars, calling it an "uneven but well-meaning biopic" and writing: "Lashings of archive footage and obvious theatrical techniques such as split-screen projections and fourth-wall breaking monologues to camera from Fortune-Lloyd help to distract from the fact that the budget isn’t sufficient to recreate key moments in the Beatles’ history ... It’s all a bit too sanctified and safe – lacking in rock’n’roll edge perhaps – but Fortune-Lloyd’s core performance is deeply empathic".

The Daily Telegraph also awarded 3/5 stars, calling the film a "superficial yet rip-roaring biopic" and writing: "A more thoughtful character study would have been obliged to venture into the “fifth Beatle’s” psyche and unpick his struggles with his homosexuality and with the drug use that resulted in a fatal overdose at the age of 32. It would also have to get under the skin of the band he helped usher to global fame rather than, as is the case with Joe Stephenson’s rudimentary biopic, portray them as mere cut-outs, Bootleg Beatles-style cheeky chappies – a triumph of wigs and beards over perceptive screenwriting."

NME gave the film 2/5 stars and wrote: "Midas Man has some empathy for its subject and a warm performance from Emily Watson as his mother Queenie, but no real curiosity about what made him tick. For this reason, it ultimately does a disservice to both Epstein the manager and Epstein the man."

The Jewish Chronicle wrote "The film is pleasingly awash with 1960s period style and is anchored by Fortune-Lloyd’s moving portrait of a gay man tragically isolated, assaulted and blackmailed because of his homosexuality."

Variety was critical of the film, writing "'Midas Man' makes us feel for Brian. Yet the film is too sketchy about too may things."

Rolling Stone was largely critical of the film, writing "A few fresh angles — like the moments Epstein breaks the fourth wall and addresses us directly on the plot — can’t quite compensate for the movie’s conventionality. Midas Man gently weeps for Epstein, and rightly so, but leaves his story largely earthbound."
