= Joe Stephenson (director) =

British director

- Born: Joe Stephenson
- Occupation: Director
- Years active: 2009–present
- Notable work: Chicken; McKellen: Playing the Part

Joe A. Stephenson is a British director. He is the founder of the B Good Picture Company, with whom he has produced all his films to date.

== Career ==
Stephenson made his feature directorial debut with the 2015 film Chicken, adapted from Freddie Machin's stage play of the same name. His second film was the acclaimed 2018 documentary McKellen: Playing the Part. His television credits include Agatha and the Midnight Murders and Ackley Bridge.

Stephenson's upcoming films include Doctor Jekyll, an adaptation of Dr Jekyll and Mr Hyde, and Midas Man, a biopic about Brian Epstein.

== Filmography ==
=== Film ===
Year	Title	Notes
2009	The Alchemistic Suitcase	Short film
2015	Chicken	
2018	McKellen: Playing the Part	Documentary
2023	Doctor Jekyll	
2024	Midas Man	Film

=== Television ===
Year	Title	Notes
2011-2012	In Love With…	
2018-2021	Ackley Bridge	Nine episodes
2020	Agatha and the Midnight Murders	Television film

=== Music videos ===
Year	Song	Artist	Notes
2015	"Instant Crush"	Natalie Imbruglia	
