= Morgan Watkins =

British actor

Morgan Watkins is a British film, television and stage actor.

== Life and career ==
Watkins trained at the Royal Academy of Dramatic Art, graduating in 2009.

Watkins played Norman Pike in the BBC television series The Hour and Rottweiler in the 2014 film Kingsman: The Secret Service.

He played Len in the revival of Edward Bond's Saved at the Lyric Hammersmith and George Gissing in the 2016 film The Limehouse Golem.

== Selected filmography ==
- Wild Bill (2011, film) as Viktoras
- The Hour (2012, TV series) as Norman Pike
- The Mill (2013, TV series) as George Windell
- Kingsman: The Secret Service (2014) as Rottweiler
- The Hooligan Factory (2014) as Trumpet
- A Little Chaos (2014) as Luc
- The Limehouse Golem (2016) as George Gissing
- Silent Witness (2017, episode: "Remembrance") as Ben Logan
- Profile (2018) as Matthew
- A Very English Scandal (2018, TV series) as Mike Steele
- The Krays' Mad Axeman (2019) as John
- Doctor Jekyll (2023) as Ewan
- Sleepover (2026) as Henry

== External sources ==
- IMDB - Morgan Watkins
