= Scott Chambers =

English actor and film producer

- Born: Scott Jeffrey Chambers; Colchester, England
- Occupations: Actor; Director; Producer
- Years active: 2007–present

Scott Jeffrey Chambers (also known as Scott Jeffrey) is an English actor and filmmaker. He produced Winnie-the-Pooh: Blood and Honey (2023) and its sequel (acting in the latter as Christopher Robin), and wrote and directed Peter Pan's Neverland Nightmare (2025). On television, he is known for his role in the ITV series Malpractice (2023).

== Early life ==
When he was six, Scott Jeffery Chambers (credited as Chambers for his role as an actor and as Jeffrey for his role as a producer) watched Scream with his older sister. As he was only a young boy around then, she covered his eyes whenever a death scene happened, such as telling him Rose McGowan "jumped down and she ran off into the woods." The following year, for his seventh birthday, his brother bought a videocassette of the movie. Chambers watched it all on his own, "and I'm actually seeing Drew Barrymore getting stabbed, and Rose actually getting her head crushed, and I was so scared!" Following this, Chambers's mother had his brother explain to Chambers what filmography was, which caused him to develop a passion for filmmaking. At eleven years old, after receiving his father's video camera, Chambers began making horror movies with his brother. In his adult years, after graduating from college, he signed up with an acting agency.

== Career ==
Chambers played Richard, a teenage boy with learning difficulties who desires stability, in the 2015 film Chicken. He discovered the film industry was very hard to get into, especially as neither of his family worked in the industry. To start off, he set up a goal of producing 100 low-budget feature films by a certain age to look like "the Terminator of producers" as a way to eventually prove potential employers his worthy. In 2020, he alongside Rhys Frake-Waterfield formed Jagged Edge Productions, an independent studio producing over 112 clickbait movies, all sent direct-to-video.

In 2022, he produced over 47 films and portrayed Dr. Oscar Beattie in the ITV series Malpractice (2023–present). Among these films was Winnie-the-Pooh: Blood and Honey (2023), which was originally intended for a direct-to-video release in October 2022. Chambers stated that he discovered through Twitter that Winnie-the-Pooh had entered the public domain and decided, "Oh, cool, I'll do him this year." While he expected the film to merely get clickbait, upon posting several teaser images on IMDb, overnight the film exploded with popularity on the internet, which forced the filmmakers to film reshoots to make it better. While the film helped launch his and Frake-Waterfield's theatrical careers as filmmakers, it also came with a lot of negative backlash towards them from the general public for "ruining [their] childhoods," even winning them the Golden Raspberry Award for Worst Picture. "We just took so much abuse and... [giggles] um, death threats and all that kind of stuff," Chambers said in an interview with JoBlo Celebrity Access. Afterwards, a sequel was produced with a higher budget and featured a new cast. Chambers portrayed Christopher Robin in Blood and Honey 2, replacing Nikolai Leon from the first film. He confessed he was hesitant to do so as he was producing the film at the same time, in addition to the negative backlash they received from the first film but accepted Frake-Waterfield's request nonetheless. As a result, he and Frake-Waterfield created a cinematic universe together called The Twisted Childhood Universe with horror adaptations of Bambi, a Life in the Woods, Peter Pan and The Adventures of Pinocchio. Chambers wrote and directed Peter Pan's Neverland Nightmare after Frake-Waterfield stepped down to direct Pinocchio Unstrung instead. While the original draft of the film was a more traditional approach to the source material, major rewrites were done due to budgetary constraints and difficult experiences felt during filming of Blood and Honey 2. Chambers is set to reprise as Christopher Robin in Winnie-the-Pooh: Blood and Honey 3 – The Lost Years, in addition to directing instead of Frake-Waterfield, and the major crossover film Poohniverse: Monsters Assemble.

In 2023, Chambers starred, as Dr Oscar Beattie, in five episodes of the ITV1 drama series Malpractice.

== Personal life ==
Chambers was born in Colchester. He is openly gay.

== Filmography ==
=== Film ===
Year	Title	Role	Notes
2011	Love+1	Youth	Short film
2012	Ticking	Eric	Short film
2013	Uwantme2killhim?	Jack	
2014	The Elevator Pitch	Jimmy	Short film
2014	Go Viral	Clayton	Short film
2015	Data Protection	Brother	Short film
2015	Brothers	Chris	Short film
2015	Chicken	Richard	
2016	Boy	Kev	Short film
2016	Lambing Season	Joe	Short film
2016	Fox Trap	Jamie	
2017	The Hippopotamus	Roman Wallace	
2017	Blood Money	Zander	
2017	Carnage	Kyle	
2017	Random Acts: Ian McKellen on growing up gay and coming out	Ian McKellen	Short film
2017	McKellen: Playing the Part	Ian McKellen	
2018	Patrick the Pug	Spike	
2018	Malevolent	Elliot	
2018	Heart's Ease	John	Short film
2020	Burnt	Jeff	Short film
2022	Bingo Queens	Aleks	Short film
2022	The Area 51 Incident	Trent	Credited as Scott Jeffrey
2023	Firenado	Delivery Man/Newsreporter Voice	Credited as Scott Jeffrey
2023	Megalodon: The Frenzy	Jet Ski Victim	Credited as Scott Jeffrey
2023	Doctor Jekyll	Rob	
2024	Winnie-the-Pooh: Blood and Honey 2	Christopher Robin	
2025	Peter Pan's Neverland Nightmare		
2026	Pinocchio Unstrung	Cameo	
2027	Winnie-the-Pooh: Blood and Honey 3 – The Lost Years		
TBA	Poohniverse: Monsters Assemble		

=== Television ===
Year	Title	Role	Notes
2007	Katy Brand's Big Ass Show	Young Urchin	1 episode
2014	Holby City	Carl Nordbrook	1 episode
2019	Porters	Cheese	1 episode
2020	Agatha and the Midnight Murders	Clarence Allen	TV movie
2021	Innocent	Mark	3 episodes
2022	Murder in Provence	Mark	1 episode
2023	Malpractice	Dr. Oscar Beattie	5 episodes
