= List of British films of 2024 =

This article lists feature-length British films and full-length documentaries that have their premiere in 2024 and were at least partly produced by the United Kingdom. It does not feature short films, medium-length films, made-for-TV films, pornographic films, filmed theater, VR films or interactive films, nor does it include films screened in film festivals in previous years that have theatrical premieres in 2024.

== British films box office ==
The highest-grossing UK-qualifying and U.K. independent British films according to the British Film Institute released in 2024, by domestic box office gross revenue, are as follows:

=== In-Year releases ===
* Denotes films still running in cinemas worldwide

Highest-grossing U.K. independent films of 2024
Rank	Title	Distributor	UK gross (£m)
1	Back to Black	StudioCanal	£12,300,000
2	One Life	Warner Bros.	£10,000,000
3	Wicked Little Letters	StudioCanal	£9,600,000
4	Conclave	Black Bear	£7,100,000
5	All of Us Strangers	Walt Disney	£5,300,000
6	Lee	Studiocanal	£4,500,000
7	The Zone of Interest	A24	£3,500,000
8	The Outrun	Studiocanal	£2,400,000
9	Kneecap	Curzon/Wildcard	£2,200,000
10	The Critic	Lionsgate	£1,700,000

==== UK qualifying ====
Highest-grossing U.K. qualifying films of 2024
Rank	Title	Distributor	UK gross (£m)
1	Wicked	Universal Pictures	£59,600,000
2	Deadpool & Wolverine	Walt Disney Pictures	£57,800,000
3	Paddington in Peru	StudioCanal	£35,700,000
4	Gladiator II	Paramount	£31,800,000
5	Beetlejuice Beetlejuice	Warner Bros.	£26,300,000
6	Sonic the Hedgehog 3	Paramount	£22,300,000
7	Bob Marley: One Love	Paramount	£17,200,000
8	Ghostbusters: Frozen Empire	Sony	£15,600,000
9	Venom: The Last Dance	Sony	£12,500,000
10	Back to Black	StudioCanal	£12,300,000

== Film premieres ==
=== January–March ===
Opening		Title	Cast and crew	Details	Ref.
J A N U A R Y	1	Arthur's Whisky	Director: Stephen Cookson; Cast: Diane Keaton, Patricia Hodge, Lulu	Sky Cinema	
J A N U A R Y	5	Race for Glory: Audi vs. Lancia	Director: Stefano Mordini; Cast: Daniel Brühl, Riccardo Scamarcio, Volker Bruch	Signature Entertainment; Set during the 1983 World Rally Championship	
J A N U A R Y	12	The Beekeeper	Director: David Ayer; Cast: Jason Statham, Emmy Raver-Lampman, Josh Hutcherson, Bobby Naderi, Phylicia Rashad, Jeremy Irons	Sky Cinema	
J A N U A R Y	18	Eno	Director: Gary Hustwit; Cast: Bilal Hasna, Louis Greatorex, Safiyya Ingar	Based on the life of Brian Eno	
J A N U A R Y	18	Kneecap	Director: Rich Peppiatt; Cast: Naoise Ó Cairealláin, Liam Óg Ó Hannaidh, JJ Ó Dochartaigh, Josie Walker	Curzon Film; Based on the story of Kneecap	
J A N U A R Y	18	Layla	Director: Amrou Al-Kadhi; Cast: Bilal Hasna, Louis Greatorex, Safiyya Ingar		
J A N U A R Y	19	The Outrun	Director: Nora Fingscheidt; Cast: Saoirse Ronan	StudioCanal; Based on The Outrun by Amy Liptrot	
J A N U A R Y	19	Super/Man: The Christopher Reeve Story	Director: Ian Bonhôte, Peter Ettedgui; Cast: Christopher Reeve	Warner Bros. Pictures; Based on the life of Christopher Reeve	
J A N U A R Y	20	10 Lives	Director: Chris Jenkins; Cast: Mo Gilligan, Simone Ashley, Sophie Okonedo, Zayn Malik, Dylan Llewellyn, Jeremy Swift, Tabitha Cross, Bill Nighy	Sky Cinema	
J A N U A R Y	20	Black Box Diaries	Director: Shiori Itō	MTV Documentary Films	
J A N U A R Y	20	Love Lies Bleeding	Director: Rose Glass; Cast: Kristen Stewart, Katy O'Brian, Jena Malone, Anna Baryshnikov, Dave Franco, Ed Harris	A24	
J A N U A R Y	21	Sebastian	Director: Mikko Mäkelä; Cast: Ruaridh Mollica, Hiftu Quasem, Ingvar Sigurdsson, Jonathan Hyde, Lara Rossi, Leanne Best	LevelK	
J A N U A R Y	26	American Star	Director: Gonzalo López-Gallego; Cast: Ian McShane, Nora Arnezeder, Adam Nagaitis, Andrés Gertrúdix	Vertigo Releasing	
F E B R U A R Y	2	Argylle	Director: Matthew Vaughn; Cast: Henry Cavill, Sam Rockwell, Bryce Dallas Howard, Bryan Cranston, Catherine O'Hara, John Cena, Samuel L. Jackson, Dua Lipa, Ariana DeBose, Rob Delaney	Apple TV+	
F E B R U A R Y	8	Someone's Daughter, Someone's Son	Director: Lorna Tucker; Cast: Colin Firth		
F E B R U A R Y	16	Last Swim	Director: Sasha Nathwani; Cast: Deba Hekmat, Narges Rashidi, Solly McLeod, Jay Lycurgo	Indie Sales	
F E B R U A R Y	16	Turn in the Wound	Director: Sasha Nathwani; Cast: Volodymyr Zelenskyy, Andriy Yermak, Patti Smith	About the people of Kyiv during the Russian invasion of Ukraine	
F E B R U A R Y	17	The Visitor	Director: Bruce LaBruce; Cast: Bishop Black, Macklin Kowal, Amy Kingsmill	Best Friend Forever; Based on Teorema by Pier Paolo Pasolini	
F E B R U A R Y	18	Another End	Director: Piero Messina; Cast: Gael García Bernal, Renate Reinsve, Bérénice Bejo, Olivia Williams	Newen Connect	
F E B R U A R Y	24	Reawakening	Director: Virginia Gilbert; Cast: Jared Harris, Erin Doherty, Juliet Stevenson	Signature Entertainment	
M A R C H	8	Timestalker	Director: Alice Lowe; Cast: Alice Lowe, Jacob Anderson, Nick Frost, Aneurin Barnard, Tanya Reynolds, Mike Wozniak, Kate Dickie	Vertigo Films	
M A R C H	8	Vindication Swim	Director: Elliott Hasler; Cast: Kirsten Callaghan, John Locke, Victoria Summer	Picnik Entertainment; Based on the life of Mercedes Gleitze	
M A R C H	9	Magpie	Director: Sam Yates; Cast: Daisy Ridley, Shazad Latif, Matilda Lutz	Signature Entertainment	
M A R C H	18	Winnie-the-Pooh: Blood and Honey 2	Director: Rhys Frake-Waterfield; Cast: Scott Chambers, Tallulah Evans, Ryan Oliva, Teresa Banham	Based on Winnie-the-Pooh by A. A. Milne and E. H. Shepard; Altitude Film Distribution	
M A R C H	29	The Beautiful Game	Director: Thea Sharrock; Cast: Micheal Ward, Bill Nighy, Tom Vaughan-Lawlor, Kit Young, Callum Scott Howells, Valeria Golino, Susan Wokoma, Cristina Rodlo, Sian Reese-Williams	Netflix	

=== April–June ===
Opening		Title	Cast and crew	Details	Ref.
A P R I L	5	Seize Them!	Director: Curtis Vowell; Cast: Aimee Lou Wood, Lolly Adefope, Nicola Coughlan, Jessica Hynes, Nick Frost	Entertainment Film Distributors	
A P R I L	5	Scoop	Director: Philip Martin; Cast: Gillian Anderson, Billie Piper, Rufus Sewell, Romola Garai, Keeley Hawes	Netflix	
A P R I L	12	Back to Black	Director: Sam Taylor-Johnson; Cast: Marisa Abela, Jack O'Connell, Eddie Marsan, Juliet Cowan, Lesley Manville	Based on the life of Amy Winehouse; StudioCanal	
A P R I L	12	Damaged	Director: Terry McDonough; Cast: Samuel L. Jackson, Vincent Cassel, Gianni Capaldi, Laura Haddock, John Hannah, Kate Dickie	Signature Entertainment	
A P R I L	13	The Ministry of Ungentlemanly Warfare	Director: Guy Ritchie; Cast: Henry Cavill, Eiza González, Alan Ritchson, Henry Golding, Alex Pettyfer	Based on Churchill's Secret Warriors: The Explosive True Story of the Special Forces Desperadoes of WWII by Damien Lewis; Lionsgate	
A P R I L	19	Swede Caroline	Director: Finn Bruce, Brook Driver; Cast: Jo Hartley, Aisling Bea, Ray Fearon		
M A Y	16	Bird	Director: Andrea Arnold; Cast: Barry Keoghan, Franz Rogowski, Nykiya Adams, Jason Buda	Mubi	
M A Y	16	On Becoming a Guinea Fowl	Director: Rungano Nyoni; Cast: Elizabeth Chisela, Henry B.J. Phiri, Susan Chardy	A24	
M A Y	17	Kinds of Kindness	Director: Yorgos Lanthimos; Cast: Emma Stone, Jesse Plemons, Willem Dafoe, Margaret Qualley, Hong Chau, Joe Alwyn, Mamoudou Athie, Hunter Schafer	Searchlight Pictures	
M A Y	19	Sister Midnight	Director: Karan Kandhari; Cast: Radhika Apte, Ashok Pathak, Chhaya Kadam, Smita Tambe	Altitude Film Distribution	
M A Y	19	The Substance	Director: Coralie Fargeat; Cast: Demi Moore, Margaret Qualley, Dennis Quaid	Mubi	
M A Y	20	Santosh	Director: Sandhya Suri; Cast: Shahana Goswami, Sanjay Bishnoi, Kushal Dubey		
M A Y	21	September Says	Director: Ariane Labed; Cast: Mia Tharia, Rakhee Thakrar, Pascale Kann	Based on Sisters by Daisy Johnson	
M A Y	22	To a Land Unknown	Director: Mahdi Fleifel; Cast: Mahmood Bakri, Aram Sabbagh, Angeliki Papoulia	Watermelon Pictures	
M A Y	29	The Commandant's Shadow	Director: Daniela Volker; Cast: Jurgen Höss, Anita Lasker-Wallfisch	About Jurgen Höss, son of Rudolf Höss	
M A Y	29	Touch	Director: Baltasar Kormákur; Cast: Egill Ólafsson, Kōki, Palmi Kormakur	Based on Touch by Ólafur Jóhann Ólafsson; Universal Pictures	
M A Y	30	Midas Man	Director: Sara Sugarman, Jonas Åkerlund; Cast: Jacob Fortune-Lloyd, Emily Watson, Eddie Marsan, Omari Douglas, Rosie Day, Lukas Gage, Charley Palmer Rothwell, Bill Milner, Jay Leno, Jonah Lees, Blake Richardson, Leo Harvey Elledge, Campbell Wallace, Adam Lawrence	Signature Entertainment	
J U N E	3	This Time Next Year	Director: Nick Moore; Cast: Lucien Laviscount, Sophie Cookson, John Hannah, Monica Dolan, Golda Rosheuvel, Mandip Gill, Will Hislop, Charlie Oscar, Keala Settle	Signature Entertainment	
J U N E	9	Witches	Director: Elizabeth Sankey; Cast: Catherine Cho, Sophia Di Martino, David Emson		
J U N E	10	Federer: Twelve Final Days	Director: Asif Kapadia, Joe Sabia; Cast: Roger Federer, Mirka Federer, Leo Federer, Myla Federer, Lenny Federer, Charlene Federer	Amazon Prime Video; About Roger Federer	
J U N E	14	Blur: To the End	Director: Toby L. Cast: Damon Albarn, Graham Coxon, Alex James, Dave Rowntree	About Blur	
J U N E	21	Something in the Water	Director: Hayley Easton Street; Cast: Hiftu Quasem, Natalie Mitson, Nicole Rietsu Setsuko, Lauren Lyle	StudioCanal UK	
J U N E	24	The Wasp	Director: Guillem Morales; Cast: Naomie Harris, Natalie Dormer, Lilly-Anne Marston-Smith	Based on The Wasp by Morgan Lloyd Malcolm	

=== July–September ===
Opening		Title	Cast and crew	Details	Ref.
J U L Y	3	A Sudden Glimpse to Deeper Things	Director: Mark Cousins	Conic; About artist Wilhelmina Barns-Graham	
J U L Y	26	Robin and the Hoods	Director: Phil Hawkins; Cast: Naomie Harris, Gwendoline Christie, Darcey Ewart, Gloria Ishikawa, Dexter Sol Ansell, Bruno Edgington-Gibson	Sky Cinema	
J U L Y	26	The Beast Within	Director: Alexander J. Farrelll Cast: Kit Harington, Ashleigh Cummings,		
J U L Y	28	Man and Witch: The Dance of a Thousand Steps	Director: Michael Hines; Cast: Tami Stronach, Greg Steinbruner, Sean Astin, Bill Bailey, Eddie Izzard, Jennifer Saunders, Michael Emerson, Shohreh Aghdashloo, Christopher Lloyd	Fathom Events	
A U G U S T	15	Alien: Romulus	Director: Fede Álvarez; Cast: Cailee Spaeny, David Jonsson, Archie Renaux, Isabela Merced, Spike Fearn	20th Century Studios; Sequel to Alien	
A U G U S T	19	And Mrs	Director: Daniel Reisinger; Cast: Aisling Bea, Colin Hanks		
A U G U S T	20	The Radleys	Director: Euros Lyn; Cast: Damian Lewis, Kelly Macdonald, Sophia Di Martino, Shaun Parkes	Cornerstone; Based on The Radleys by Matt Haig	
A U G U S T	29	Sanatorium Under the Sign of the Hourglass	Director: Brothers Quay; Cast: Tadeusz Janiszewski, Wioletta Kopańska, Andrzej Kłak, Allison Bell, Zenaida Yanowsky	Based on the novel of the same name by Bruno Schulz; KimStim	
A U G U S T	30	Diciannove	Director: Giovanni Tortorici; Cast: Manfredi Marini, Vittoria Planeta, Dana Giuliano, Zackari Delmas, Luca Lazzareschi		
A U G U S T	31	The End	Director: Joshua Oppenheimer; Cast: Tilda Swinton, George MacKay, Moses Ingram, Michael Shannon, Bronagh Gallagher, Tim McInnerny		
S E P T E M B E R	1	The Brutalist	Director: Brady Corbet; Cast: Adrien Brody, Felicity Jones, Joe Alwyn, Alessandro Nivola, Jonathan Hyde, Guy Pearce	Focus Features	
S E P T E M B E R	3	2073	Director: Asif Kapadia; Cast: Samantha Morton, Naomi Ackie, Hector Hewer	Based on La Jetée by Chris Marker; Neon	
S E P T E M B E R	3	Harvest	Director: Athina Rachel Tsangari; Cast: Caleb Landry Jones, Harry Melling, Rosy McEwen, Arinzé Kene, Thalissa Teixeira, Frank Dillane	Based on Harvest by Jim Crace; Mubi	
S E P T E M B E R	4	The Whip	Director: Christopher Presswell; Cast: Shian Denovan, Gala Wesson, Tom Knight, Daniel Davids, Ray Bullock Jnr.	Workbus	
S E P T E M B E R	5	The Cut	Director: Sean Ellis; Cast: Orlando Bloom, Caitríona Balfe, John Turturro		
S E P T E M B E R	5	The Salt Path	Director: Marianne Elliott; Cast: Jason Isaacs, Gillian Anderson	Based on The Salt Path by Raynor Winn; Black Bear Pictures	
S E P T E M B E R	5	William Tell	Director: R. J. Cutler, David Furnish; Cast: Claes Bang, Connor Swindells, Ellie Bamber, Golshifteh Farahani, Jonah Hauer-King, Rafe Spall, Emily Beecham	Based on William Tell by Friedrich Schiller	
S E P T E M B E R	6	Elton John: Never Too Late	Director: R. J. Cutler, David Furnish; Cast: Elton John	Based on the story of Elton John; Disney+	
S E P T E M B E R	6	Hard Truths	Director: Mike Leigh; Cast: Marianne Jean-Baptiste, Michele Austin	StudioCanal	
S E P T E M B E R	6	On Falling	Director: Laura Carreira; Cast: Joana Santos	Conic	
S E P T E M B E R	6	We Live in Time	Director: John Crowley; Cast: Florence Pugh, Andrew Garfield	StudioCanal	
S E P T E M B E R	7	The Penguin Lessons	Director: Peter Cattaneo; Cast: Steve Coogan	Based on The Penguin Lessons by Tom Michell; Lionsgate	
S E P T E M B E R	7	The Return	Director: Uberto Pasolini; Cast: Ralph Fiennes, Juliette Binoche, Charlie Plummer	Based on The Odyssey by Homer	
S E P T E M B E R	8	The Assessment	Director: Fleur Fortuné; Cast: Elizabeth Olsen, Alicia Vikander, Himesh Patel, Minnie Driver, Indira Varma		
S E P T E M B E R	8	Conclave	Director: Edward Berger; Cast: Ralph Fiennes, Stanley Tucci, John Lithgow, Lucian Msamati	Based on Conclave by Robert Harris; Black Bear Pictures	
S E P T E M B E R	8	Bring Them Down	Director: Christopher Andrews; Cast: Barry Keoghan, Colm Meaney, Christopher Abbott, Paul Ready	Mubi	
S E P T E M B E R	20	Get Away	Director: Steffen Haars; Cast: Nick Frost, Aisling Bea, Sebastian Croft		
S E P T E M B E R	22	Daddy's Head	Director: Benjamin Barfoot; Cast: Rupert Turnbull, Julia Brown, Charles Aitken	Shudder	

=== October–December ===
Opening		Title	Cast and crew	Details	Ref.
O C T O B E R	4	Take Cover	Director: Ben Taylor; Cast: Scott Adkins, Alice Eve, Jack Parr	Signature Entertainment	
O C T O B E R	5	Joy	Director: Nick McKinless; Cast: Bill Nighy, Thomasin McKenzie, James Norton	Netflix; Based on the true story of the world's first IVF baby	
O C T O B E R	9	Blitz	Director: Steve McQueen; Cast: Saoirse Ronan, Elliot Heffernan, Leigh Gill, Harris Dickinson, Erin Kellyman, Stephen Graham, Paul Weller	Apple TV+	
O C T O B E R	24	Canary Black	Director: Pierre Morel; Cast: Kate Beckinsale, Rupert Friend, Ray Stevenson, Saffron Burrows	Amazon MGM Studios	
N O V E M B E R	1	Hitpig!	Director: Cinzia Angelini, David Feiss; Cast: Jason Sudeikis, Lilly Singh, Rainn Wilson, Anitta, RuPaul, Hannah Gadsby	Based on Pete & Pickles by Berkeley Breathed	
N O V E M B E R	6	Four Letters of Love	Director: Polly Steele; Cast: Pierce Brosnan, Helena Bonham-Carter, Gabriel Byrne, Ann Skelly	Based on Four Letters of Love by Niall Williams	
N O V E M B E R	8	Paddington in Peru	Director: Dougal Wilson; Cast: Hugh Bonneville, Julie Walters, Madeleine Harris, Samuel Joslin, Ben Whishaw, Emily Mortimer, Jim Broadbent, Olivia Colman, Antonio Banderas	StudioCanal; Sequel to Paddington 2	
N O V E M B E R	22	Gladiator II	Director: Ridley Scott; Cast: Paul Mescal, Denzel Washington, Connie Nielsen, May Calamawy, Derek Jacobi, Joseph Quinn, Fred Hechinger, Pedro Pascal	Paramount Pictures; Sequel to Gladiator	
D E C E M B E R	4	That Christmas	Director: Simon Otto; Cast leaders: Brian Cox, Fiona Shaw, Jodie Whittaker and Bill Nighy	Netflix; Based on That Christmas and Other Stories by Richard Curtis and Rebecca Cobb	
D E C E M B E R	6	Mary	Director: D. J. Caruso; Cast: Noa Cohen, Ido Tako, Ori Pfeffer, Hilla Vidor, Dudley O'Shaughnessy, Anthony Hopkins	Netflix	
D E C E M B E R	25	Wallace & Gromit: Vengeance Most Fowl	Director: Nick Park; Cast: Ben Whitehead, Peter Kay, Reece Shearsmith	BBC Films; Based on Wallace & Gromit by Nick Park	

=== Other premieres ===
Title	Director	Release date	Ref.
A Game of Two Halves	Khayam Khan	23 February 2024	
Alien Interloper the Movie	Calvin Cassidy	15 June 2024	
Andrea Bocelli: Because I Believe	Cosima Spender	6 September 2024 (Toronto International Film Festival)	
A Gangster's Kiss	Ray Burdis	16 June 2024	
An Hour	Stephen Cartwright	29 January 2024	
Another World	Sean Sadler	14 February 2024	
Blue Road: The Edna O'Brien Story	Sinéad O'Shea	7 September 2024 (Toronto International Film Festival)	
Broken Bird	Joanne Mitchell	22 August 2024 (FrightFest)	
Collective Monologue	Jessica Sarah Rinland	15 August 2024 (Locarno Film Festival)	
Cookster: The Darkest Days	Stephen Roach	May 2024	
Devo	Chris Smith	21 January 2024 (Sundance Film Festival)	
Dirty Boy	Doug Rao	17 May 2024	
The Fisherman and the Banker	Sheena Sumaria	17 February 2024 (Big Sky Documentary Film Festival)	
The Hexagonal Hive and a Mouse in a Maze	Bartek Dziadosz, Tilda Swinton	June 2024	
The Last Breath	Joachim Hedén	12 June 2024	
Made in England: The Films of Powell and Pressburger	David Hinton	21 February 2024	
The Night Before Christmas in Wonderland	Peter Baynton	15 November 2024	
One to One: John & Yoko	Kevin Macdonald, Sam Rice-Edwards	30 August 2024 (Venice Film Festival)	
Paul & Paulette Take a Bath	Jethro Massey	4 September 2024 (Venice Film Festival)	
Portraits of Dangerous Women	Pascal Bergamin	11 October 2024	
Shikun	Amos Gitai	18 February 2024 (Berlin International Film Festival)	
Since Yesterday: The Untold Story of Scotland's Girl Bands	Blair Young, Carla J. Easton	21 August 2024 (Edinburgh International Film Festival)	
Something in the Water	Hayley Easton Street	22 March 2024	
Strike: An Uncivil War	Daniel Gordon	16 June 2024 (Sheffield Doc/Fest)	
Twiggy	Sadie Frost	18 October 2024 (BFI London Film Festival)	
Who Is James Payton?	Oliver Guy-Watkins	4 January 2024	
Witch	Craig Hinde, Marc Zammit	29 April 2024	
X Trillion	Eleanor Church	1 May 2024	

=== Culturally British films ===
The following list comprises films not produced by a British or UK film studio but is strongly associated with British culture. The films in this list should fulfil at least three of the following criteria:

- The film is adapted from a British source material.
- The story is at least partially set in the United Kingdom.
- The film was at least partially produced in the United Kingdom.
- Many of the film's cast and crew members are British.

Title	Country of origin	Adaptation	Story setting	Film locations	British cast and crew
Better Man	Australia; United States		Staffordshire and London, England	London, England	Robbie Williams, Jonno Davies, Steve Pemberton, Alison Steadman, Frazer Hadfield, Jake Simmance
Bob Marley: One Love	United States		London, UK	London, UK	Kingsley Ben-Adir, Lashana Lynch, James Norton, Tosin Cole, Anthony Welsh
Young Woman and the Sea	United States		UK	UK	Daisy Ridley, Stephen Graham, Christopher Eccleston, Amelia Warner, Sian Clifford

Wicked fulfills two of the criteria as it has British cast and crew members and was filmed in Elstree and Buckinghamshire. Civil War fulfills two of these criteria as it was produced in the UK and has British cast and crew members including Sonoya Mizuno, Rob Hardy, Jake Roberts and Alex Garland. Speak No Evil and Apartment 7A also fulfill two criteria, by having British cast and crew members and being produced in the UK.

== See also ==
- Lists of British films
- 2024 in film
- 2024 in British music
- 2024 in British radio
- 2024 in British television
- 2024 in the United Kingdom
- List of British films of 2023
- List of British films of 2025
