= Sarah Dawson =

Sarah Dawson may refer to:

- Sarah Dawson (field hockey) (born 1982), American field hockey player
- Sarah Dawson (softball) (born 1975), American softball pitcher and coach
- Sarah Lynn Dawson (born 1981), English actress and screenwriter
- Sarah Morgan Dawson (1842–1909), American diarist and editorial writer
- Sarah Dawson (Survivor), competitor on Survivor: Philippines
