= Dracula Reborn =

- Movie poster
- Directed by: Patrick McManus
- Written by: Patrick McManus
- Produced by: Ray Haboush
- Starring: Corey Landis; Victoria Summer; Krash Miller; Stuart Rigby; Keith Reay
- Cinematography: Cira Felina Bolla
- Edited by: Maui Toca
- Music by: Greg Nicolett
- Production companies: Still Night Monster Movies; Automatic Media
- Distributed by: Halcyon International Pictures; Phase 4 Films
- Release date: October 1, 2012
- Running time: 88 minutes
- Country: United States
- Language: English

Dracula Reborn is a 2012 vampire-themed direct-to-video horror film, directed and written by Patrick McManus, making his feature film directorial debut. Produced by Ray Haboush, the film stars Corey Landis, Victoria Summer, Krash Miller, Stuart Rigby and Keith Reay. It is a modernized, loosely based take on Bram Stoker's 1897 novel Dracula, taking place in Los Angeles, California, where a wealthy Count Dracula looks to purchase an abandoned building and pursue the wife of his realtor, Jonathan Harker.

== Plot ==
In Los Angeles, California, realtor Jonathan Harker proposes the sale of an abandoned building in a gang-dominated neighborhood for $12.5 million to his wealthy client Vladimir Sarkany - who is, in actuality, the legendary Vampire, Count Dracula. The sale makes Jonathan enough money to start a family with his wife, Lina. The night that Jonathan visits Sarkany at his home to have the property deed signed, he notices a painted picture reminiscent of Lina. Later, Quincy Morris warns him about Sarkany, who murdered his girlfriend, Lucy Spencer.

Police detectives Holmwood and Varna investigate Lucy's disappearance. Dracula's associate, Renfield, frames Quincy for her murder. Jonathan takes Lina to see the painting at Sarkany's home, where he begins to hypnotically seduce Lina, who reminds him of woman in the painting. Jonathan and Lina head back home, but their car breaks down on the way, causing them to camp in the woods. During the night, Sarkany hypnotizes the detectives and goes to bite Lina, sparking her illness. At dawn, the car is able to start back up and Jonathan takes Lina to get blood work done by Dr. Joan Seward (Dani Lennon).

The following day, the detectives discover Lucy's corpse in a trunk. Jonathan finds out Lina is infected with an anonymous organism that is multiplying inside her system. While on the run, Quincy pleas to Jonathan for help killing Sarkany, although Jonathan refuses to believe he is a Vampire. Shortly after, Renfield runs Quincy over with a truck, killing him. When Jonathan finds Lina feasting on their dog's corpse, he contacts expert Vampire hunter, Van Helsing, for help and learns Quincy has been killed.

After Sarkany seduces Lina and takes her away, Jonathan learns from Van Helsing that they have one day to rescue Lina and kill Sarkany, or Lina will become a Vampire herself. Ignoring Van Helsing's advice Jonathan goes to Sarkany's house to confront him with a crucifix, but it has no effect and Sarkany drives him away with his hypnosis. As Jonathan drives away hallucinates that he sees Lina on the road and crashes his car, but he survives and is brought home by Van Helsing.

The next day, the detectives come to arrest Jonathan for his wife’s murder, but are killed by Van Helsing. Jonathan and Van Helsing confront Sarkany at his new house, which is about to go into closure. They find Lina resting in the house's basement, and Johnathan takes her upstairs while Van Helsing goes to kill Sarkany. Van Helsing fails and is killed. As Jonathan and Lina are about to escape, they are ambushed and attacked by Sarkany, who has now reverted to his true Vampiric form. However, Jonathan and Lina manage to kill him by driving stakes through his heart. As Sarkany crumbles to dust, Jonathan happily embraces Lina. But to his horror, he discovers that Lina has become a Vampire as she fatally bites him. Lina is then shown having taken over Sarkany's home, with Renfield now serving her.

== Cast ==
- Corey Landis as Jonathan Harker
- Victoria Summer as Lina Harker
- Krash Miller as Quincy Morris
- Stuart Rigby as Vladimir Sakarny/Count Dracula
- Ian Pfister as Renfield
- Keith Reay as Van Helsing
- Preston James Hillier as Detective Holmwood
- Linda Bella as Lucy Spencer
- Amy Johnston as Vampire Lucy
- Charlie Garcia as Detective Varna
- Dani Lennon as Dr. Joan Seward
- Rene Arreola as Bandana Vato
- Haref Topete as Gangbanger
- Patrick F. McCallum as Trigger
- Sharlene Brown as Harker's Assistant
- Christianna Carmine as Petra Hawkings

== Release ==
The film was released by Phase 4 Films in North America and by other outlets in the United Kingdom on Video on Demand and DVD on October 1, 2012 and March 26, 2013.

== Reception ==
Dracula Reborn was greeted with mixed to negative reviews. Dave Gammon of HorrorNews.net credited Patrick McManus for being "brash" to have created a new vampire tale in an over-saturated genre. He praises the cinematography and performances, particularly Ian Pfister’s portrayal of Renfield, but ultimately criticized the film for leaving “little to the imagination” and claimed it “arguably never should have been conceived”. Gammon gave the film a 2 out of 5.
