= Werner Daehn =

German actor

- Born: 14 October 1967 (age 58); Worms am Rhein, West Germany
- Occupation: Actor
- Years active: 1993–present

Werner Daehn (born 14 October 1967) is a German actor, who has worked with Vin Diesel and Samuel L. Jackson in XXX, with Jason Priestley in Colditz an ITV1 2005 miniseries, with Bill Pullman in Revelations and with Steven Seagal in Shadow Man. He has also worked in German productions like Stauffenberg - Rebellion of Conscience (also titled Valkeryie on the German DVD) and King of Thieves (nominated in Germany for the Grimme Prize). He appears momentarily in the film The Lives of Others by Florian Henckel von Donnersmarck. He also took part in a British production for the BBC, when in 2011 he played the role of Dr Georg Maurer, the German doctor who treated the Manchester United players who survived the 1958 Munich air disaster. In 2016, he played the role of Josef Von Zimmerman, in Game of Aces. In 2014 he played the role of Timo Lemke in Tatort: Der Maulwurf which was then aired on the Das Erste channel.

== Partial filmography ==
- 1996 Dangerous Dowry as Wanja
- 2001 Enemy at the Gates as Politruk
- 2002 XXX as Kirill
- 2004 King of Thieves as Mucki
- 2004 Stauffenberg (TV Movie) as Sturmbannführer Trabener Straße (uncredited)
- 2005 Revelations (TV Mini-Series) as Asteroth
- 2006 The Lives of Others as Einsatzleiter In Uniform
- 2007 The Counterfeiters as Rosenthal
- 2008 Speed Racer as Sempre Fi-Ber Leader
- 2008 Valkyrie as Major Ernst John Von Freyend
- 2010 Zeiten ändern Dich as Zivilpolizist
- 2010 Kajínek as Perner
- 2011 Die Superbullen - Sie kennen keine Gnade as Thilo
- 2011 United as Professor Maurer
- 2011 Pariser Platz - Berlin as Ralf
- 2011 The Big Black as Humphrey
- 2012 Alex Cross as Erich Nunemacher
- 2013 The Berlin File as Yuri
- 2014 Der Tropfen - Ein Roadmovie as Verfassungsschtzer
- 2014 The Silent Mountain as Sven Kornatz
- 2014 Allies as Captain Dekker
- 2015 Field of Lost Shoes as General Franz Sigel
- 2015 Le bureau des légendes as FSB Officer Vlad
- 2016 Mann im Spagat: Pace, Cowboy, Pace as Pfleger
- 2016 Game of Aces as Josef Von Zimmermann
- 2017 Tom of Finland as Müller
- 2017 Das schaffen wir schon as Putin
- 2018 Das letzte Mahl as Siegmund Loewe
- 2018 Wilkolak as SS Soldier
- 2019 The Operative as Röska
- 2022 Medieval as Ulrich
