= Materna (film) =

- Directed by: David Gutnik
- Written by: David Gutnik; Jade Eshete; Assol Abdullina
- Produced by: Emily McEvoy; Liz Cardenas
- Starring: Jade Eshete; Assol Abdullina; Kate Lyn Sheil; Lindsay Burdge; Rory Culkin; Sturgill Simpson
- Cinematography: Greta Zozula; Chananun Chotrungroj; Kelly Jeffrey
- Edited by: Elizabeth Rao; Brúsi Ólason
- Music by: Andrew Orkin
- Production company: Ten to the Six Pictures
- Distributed by: Utopia
- Release dates: 15 April 2020 (Tribeca Festival); 10 August 2021 (US)
- Running time: 105 minutes
- Countries: United States, Kyrgyzstan
- Languages: English, Russian

Materna is a 2020 American drama film co-written and directed by David Gutnik in his feature directorial debut. Starring Jade Eshete, Rory Culkin, Kate Lyn Sheil, Sturgill Simpson and Lindsay Burdge, the film won the awards for Best Actress and Best Cinematography at the 2020 Tribeca Festival, where Gutnik was also nominated for Best New Director.

== Plot ==
Jean, a VR software developer, encounters real-life consequences while working in virtual reality; Mona, a struggling actress from Harlem, tries to reconcile with her estranged Jehovah’s witness mother; Ruth, a concerned mother, must confront the possibility she has created a monster – her son; Perizad, a Kyrgyz immigrant, returns to her homeland to bury the last male member of her family. Four women’s lives, separated by race, culture, religion and class but connected by the complexities of motherhood are bound together by an incident on the New York city subway.

== Cast ==
- Jade Eshete as Mona
- Assol Abdullina as Perizad
- Kate Lyn Sheil as Jean
- Lindsay Burdge as Ruth
- Michael Chernus as David
- Rory Culkin as Gabe
- Cassandra Freeman as Wanda
- Sturgill Simpson as Paul
- Kaili Vernoff as Jean's Mom
- Jake Katzman as Jared
- Kara Young as Kara
- Zhamilya Sydykbaeva as Fatima
- Jamal Seidakmatova as Aisha

== Release ==
Materna was scheduled to have its world premiere at the 19th Tribeca Film Festival in April 2020 before the festival was postponed because of the COVID-19 pandemic (COVID-19). In April 2021, it was announced that Utopia acquired worldwide distribution rights to the film. The film was released theatrically, on VOD and on digital platforms on 10 August 2021.

== Reception ==
On review aggregator Rotten Tomatoes, Materna holds an approval rating of 71%, based on 17 reviews.

Kelsie Dickinson of Screen Queens called Materna “nothing short of radical,” writing that it “leaves a lasting and profound impression.” Alisha Netis of Black Girl Nerds wrote that the film is “raw and completely unfiltered” and “people need to see this.”

Jared Mobarak of The Film Stage praised the film for the performances, writing, “You’re getting a masterclass in acting.” Rachel West of Alliance of Women Film Journalists noted, “Materna’s strength lies in unifying culturally diverse stories” in “what is ultimately a unique and refreshing perspective on both motherhood and womanhood.”

Rich Kline of Shadows on the Wall wrote, “Gutnik uses disarming filmmaking techniques to make the audience uneasy, forcing a response,” and that the film is “packed with skilled depictions of the tension between independence and vulnerability, taking almost surreal routes beneath the surface.”

Jourdain Searles of The Hollywood Reporter called the film "a thought-provoking debut", and wrote that the final, Kyrgyzstan-set story in the anthology is “deeply felt and closely observed," with “a richness that warrants its own film.”

Nick Schager of Variety wrote that while the film "wisely doesn’t try to neatly resolve its multifaceted tensions", and the performances are "attuned to the material’s fundamental air of incompleteness and instability" the "forlorn and minimalist tone struck throughout proves too uniform, thanks in part to cinematography that — in each segment — segues similarly between intense close-ups and remote compositions in which figures are spied in dark, empty spaces or constricting doorways."

Beatrice Loayza of The New York Times wrote that while each section "leaves its mark", the "glue uniting these women of different ethnicities and backgrounds reads like a failed attempt to carve a more ambitious meaning out of individual stories already brimming with possibility."

Tomris Laffly of RogerEbert.com rated the film 2 stars out of 4 and called the film "less an Alejandro Iñárritu-style collection of interwoven connections, and more something that feels way too happenstantial", writing that what it "tries to say on race, class, culture, and society remains all too vague and surface-level in the aftermath."
