= Tender (film) =

- Directed by: Felicia Pride
- Written by: Felicia Pride
- Produced by: Felicia Pride; Regina Hoyles
- Starring: Farelle Walker; Trishauna Clarke
- Cinematography: Ludovica Isidori
- Edited by: Tess Karmann
- Music by: Asha Santée
- Production companies: Felix & Annie
- Distributed by: Vimeo
- Release dates: 7 March 2020 (Outfest Fusion); 4 May 2020 (Vimeo)
- Running time: 14 minutes
- Country: United States
- Language: English

Tender (stylized as tender) is a 2020 debut short drama film written and directed by Felicia Pride. It follows two generation X Black women (portrayed by Farelle Walker and Trishauna Clarke) who have to deal with the morning after a one-night stand. The film premiered at 2020 Outfest Fusion and was released online on May 4, 2020. Tender received the Lionsgate/STARZ Short Film Award at the BlackStar Film Festival.

== Plot ==
The film "explores the dynamic between two women who take a dive into a complex morning after a simple one-night-stand."

== Cast ==
- Farelle Walker as Kiana
- Trishauna Clarke as Lulu

== Production ==
Tender is Felicia Pride's directorial debut. She stated that she hoped to capture "the power of the bonds between Black women" and to depict Black joy and connection.

Regina Hoyles was the producer and Ludovica Isidori was the cinematographer. The film was produced by Felix & Annie, Pride's production company. The company used GoFundMe to fundraise for the film, and earned over $10,000 from their $5,000 goal.

By September 2020, a feature film version of Tender was under development.

== Release ==
Tender premiered at 2020 Outfest Fusion. It also showed at the Seattle Black Film Festival, the BlackStar Film Festival, and the 2020 American Black Film Festival. On May 4, 2020, the film was released online on Vimeo and the release was featured on the Black diaspora film review website Shadow & Act.

== Critical reception ==
In a review for The Root, Tonja Renee Stidhum wrote, "It is a special salve to witness two Black women with total agency loving up on each other and providing adequate space for each other in a world that suffocates us." Shelli Nicole wrote for Autostraddle, "It’s a look at the morning after, one not filled with regret and a quick escape but instead, one that becomes infinitely more intimate than the physical aspect of the night before."

== Awards ==
- 2020 – Lionsgate/STARZ Short Film Award, BlackStar Film Festival
- 2020 – Best Director, Seattle Black Film Festival
