= Jade Eshete =

American actress (born 1985)

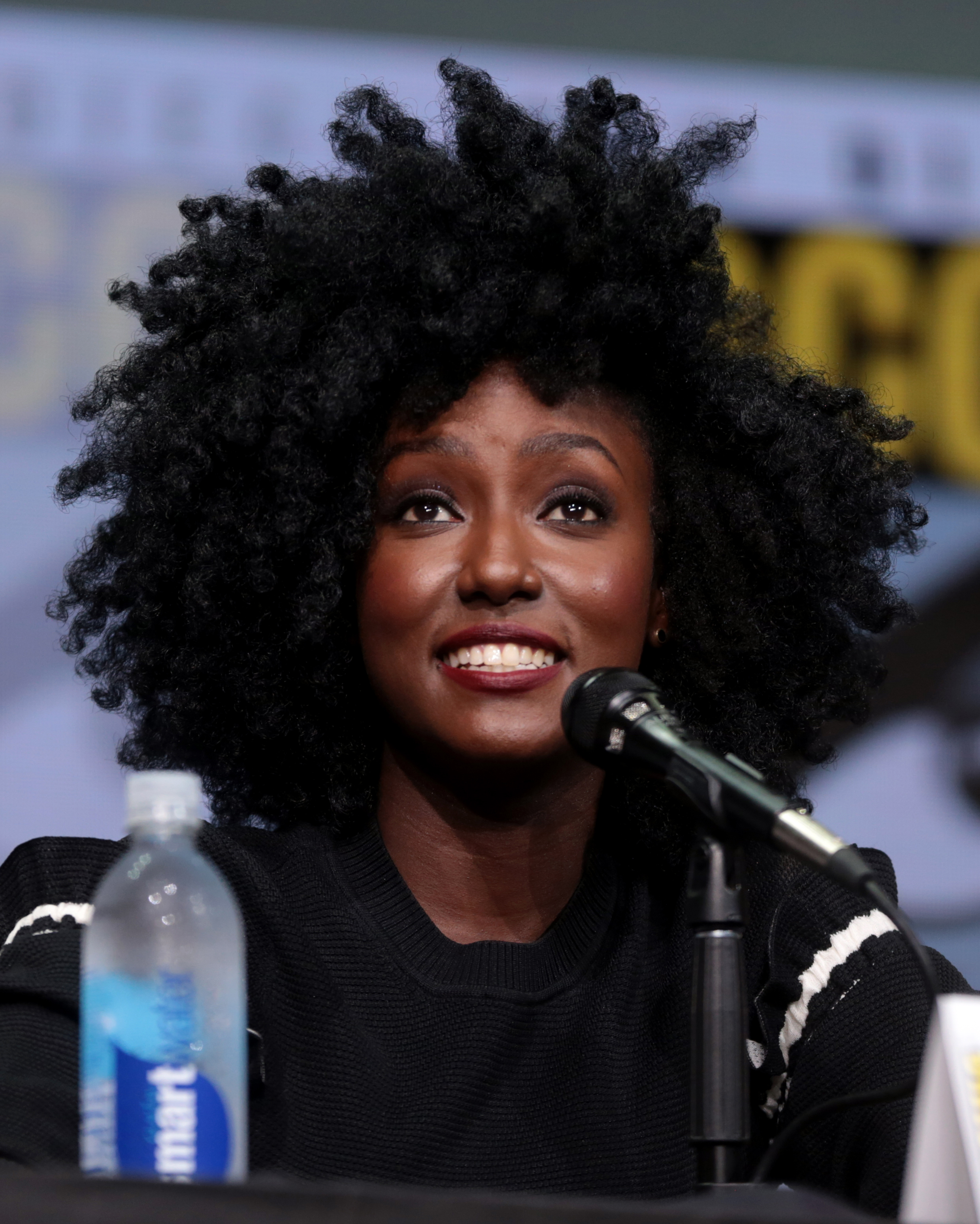
- Eshete at the 2017 San Diego Comic-Con
- Born: January 9, 1985 (age 41); Brooklyn, New York, US
- Occupation: Actress
- Years active: 2012-present

Jade Eshete (born January 9, 1985) is an American television and film actress. She starred in the BBC America series Dirk Gently's Holistic Detective Agency.

== Early life ==
Jade Eshete was born to Guyanese and Ethiopian parents in Brooklyn, New York. While obtaining her structural engineering degree from The City College of New York, she volunteered with National Dance Institute helping inner city youth learn dance.

== Career ==
Upon graduation, Eshete started her professional career in commercial print modeling for brands including L'Oreal Paris, Marshalls, QVC, Essence Magazine, Dark & Lovely and SoftSheen-Carson. She then transitioned into featured roles on stage, including the character Squeak in the national tour of the musical The Color Purple, directed by Gary Griffin. She was also a featured singer in the international tour of Hair, directed by Diane Paulus.

She also appeared in the short films 2015 Brooklove and the 2017 Ache.

On television, Eshete has been seen in episodes of HBO's 2012 series High Maintenance, Hulu's 2014 series Deadbeat, NBC's 2016 series Shades of Blue and Showtime's Billions. Most notably she has starred as Farah Black in the BBC America science-fiction detective 2016 series Dirk Gently's Holistic Detective Agency.

== Filmography ==
=== Film ===
| Year | Title | Role | Notes |
|---|---|---|---|
| 2015 | Brooklove | Mia | Short Film |
| 2017 | Ache | L'Toya | Short Film |
| 2017 | Bruce!!! | Kerri | |
| 2020 | Materna | Mona | |
| 2020 | Really Love | Mecca | |

=== Television ===
| Year | Title | Role | Notes |
|---|---|---|---|
| 2012 | High Maintenance | Jaden | Episode: "Esme" |
| 2014 | Deadbeat | Drunk Girl | Episode: "Am-Ish" |
| 2016 | Shades of Blue | Receptionist | 3 Episodes |
| 2016 | Dirk Gently's Holistic Detective Agency | Farah Black | Main role |
| 2019 | Billions | Lauren Turner | |
| 2019 | It's Bruno! | Rosa Persad | Recurring role |
| 2023 | Black Cake | Mathilda | Recurring role |
