= I Lost My Body =

2019 French adult animated film

- Theatrical film poster
- French: J'ai perdu mon corps
- Directed by: Jérémy Clapin
- Screenplay by: Jérémy Clapin; Guillaume Laurant
- Based on: Happy Hand by Guillaume Laurant
- Produced by: Marc du Pontavice
- Starring: Hakim Faris; Victoire du Bois; Patrick d'Assumçao
- Edited by: Benjamin Massoubre
- Music by: Dan Levy
- Animation by: Gao Shan Pictures
- Production company: Xilam Animation
- Distributed by: Rezo Films
- Release dates: 17 May 2019 (Cannes); 6 November 2019 (France)
- Running time: 81 minutes
- Country: France
- Language: French
- Budget: €5 million
- Box office: $1.1 million

I Lost My Body (French: J'ai perdu mon corps) is a 2019 French adult animated fantasy drama film directed by Jérémy Clapin, based on the novel Happy Hand by Guillaume Laurant. It premiered in the Critics' Week section at the 2019 Cannes Film Festival, where it won the Nespresso Grand Prize, becoming the first animated film to do so in the section's history. The film was nominated for Best Animated Feature at the 92nd Academy Awards.

== Plot ==
A severed hand escapes from a refrigerator in a laboratory and begins a journey across the suburbs of Paris to reunite with its body, that of a young man named Naoufel. His story is told via flashbacks.

As a boy in Morocco, Naoufel aspires to be a pianist and an astronaut and records his day-to-day life on a tape recorder. While riding in a car with his parents, he distracts his father while he is driving, causing a crash. Naoufel survives, but both of his parents are killed. He is forced to live in France with his emotionally distant uncle and his crude cousin.

As a young man, Naoufel works as a pizza deliveryman, often criticized by his boss for being late. On one occasion, Naoufel delivers a pizza to a young woman, Gabrielle, at her apartment block. They never see each other, as Naoufel is unable to get through the lobby's malfunctioning security door, but they have a conversation through the intercom, and Naoufel becomes infatuated with her.

Naoufel tracks Gabrielle to the library where she works and follows her to a nearby neighborhood where she drops off medicine to a carpenter, her uncle Gigi. Naoufel, seeing an old posted ad for an apprentice, quickly uses this as an excuse for why he is there. Gigi is reluctant but accepts after learning that Naoufel is an orphan. Naoufel moves out of his uncle's house and into an attic apartment provided by Gigi. He learns the tools of the trade and edges closer to Gabrielle, though he never mentions their first encounter.

After a conversation about the arctic, Naoufel builds a wooden igloo on a nearby rooftop for Gabrielle. Returning home one day, he finds his cousin talking to Gabrielle, and discovers that he has invited them both to a party. That evening, Naoufel takes Gabrielle to the rooftop, where they discuss fate; Naoufel wonders if it can be changed by doing something unexpected, such as leaping from the roof onto a nearby crane. Naoufel shows Gabrielle the igloo he built and reveals that they had met before when he delivered pizza. Gabrielle is upset, unsure of Naoufel's intentions and fearing that he had taken advantage of Gigi solely in order to pursue her. She leaves in a rage. Hurt, Naoufel goes to his cousin's party alone and gets into a drunken fight. The next morning, Naoufel goes to work hungover, sporting a black eye. While cutting wood on a bandsaw, Naoufel is distracted by a fly and tries to catch it as his father taught him when young, snagging his watch on the blade and severing his hand.

Back in the present, the hand reaches Naoufel and lies on his bed while he sleeps, but it cannot re-attach itself and eventually hides under the bed. Naoufel, depressed and hopeless, revisits his old tape recorder, which still has recordings of his parents – including the fatal car ride. Gigi attempts to talk to him, but Naoufel does not respond. Gabrielle comes to see him and finds his room empty. Inside the cupboard, she finds an igloo that his severed hand had built out of sugar cubes. After searching the empty igloo on the roof, Gabrielle finds Naoufel's abandoned tape recorder and discovers a new recording on it. Listening, she learns he had leapt off the ledge and onto the crane as he had once discussed, thereby taping over the recording of his parents' deaths.

In a final flashback after making the jump, Naoufel lies on the crane and smiles to himself as he looks out at the city. His severed hand retreats into the snow.

== Voice cast ==
Character	French	English dub
Naoufel	Hakim Faris	Dev Patel
Gabrielle	Victoire Du Bois	Alia Shawkat
Gigi	Patrick d'Assumçao	George Wendt
Young Naoufel	Alphonse Arfi	Tucker Chandler
The Father	Hichem Mesbah	Anouar H. Smaine
The Mother	Myriam Loucif	Sarah Lynn Dawson
Raouf	Bellamine Abdelmalek	Jonny Mars
Mrs. Lussac	Nicole Favart	Barbara Goodson
Baby's Mother	Céline Ronté	Tara Sands

== Production ==
In 2011, while Marc du Pontavice was working on a live-action film with screenwriter Guillaume Laurant, Laurant mentioned a book he had written titled Happy Hand; upon reading it, du Pontavice fell in love with the idea of making a hand the protagonist of an animated film. In 2012, after acquiring the rights to Guillaume Laurant's novel, Marc du Pontavice contacted Jérémy Clapin to suggest that he adapt the book. At the 2013 Annecy International Animation Film Festival, it was announced as the film that would succeed Oggy and the Cockroaches: The Movie, described by du Pontavice as "a departure from previous animated feature films, Go West! A Lucky Luke Adventure and Oggy", both family films based on franchises.

Jérémy Clapin wanted to avoid a hand resembling Thing from The Addams Family, hence the need to find a unique body language for the limb. Clapin also wanted the protagonist, Naoufel, to feel uncomfortable in his own skin and uprooted; the fact that he comes from Morocco reinforces the idea of a lost paradise: a radiant past that contrasts with his lackluster arrival in Paris. The film is set in the 1990s, a time that Clapin was well aware of and enjoyed reflecting upon, when people often opted for things that weren't electronic, as these were more tangible, physical objects that required manual handling. The protagonist Naoufel's hand is named Rosalie.

Jérémy Clapin and Julien Bisaro storyboarded the entire film. Most of the animation was produced at Xilam's studios in Paris and Lyon using Blender mixing 2D and CGI, while some of the CGI animation was produced at Gao Shan Pictures in Réunion in the Indian Ocean. The film's budget was €5 million. The film was originally scheduled to premiere in the summer of 2016 and its English title was going to be Grab before becoming I Lost My Body.

== Release ==
In May 2019, following its Cannes premiere, Netflix acquired the worldwide distribution rights to the film, excluding France, Turkey, China and the Benelux region.

The film was released in France on 6 November 2019 by distributor Rezo Films. Netflix also gave the film a theatrical release in some countries, including the United States on 15 November and the United Kingdom on 22 November.

== Reception ==
=== Box office ===
I Lost My Body grossed $1,106,777 in France and $29,654 in Turkey, bringing its total box office earnings to $1,136,431.

=== Critical reception ===
On the review aggregator website Rotten Tomatoes, 97% of 89 critics' reviews are positive, with an average rating of 8.1/10. The website's consensus reads: "Beautifully animated and utterly unique, I Lost My Body takes audiences on a singularly strange journey whose unexpected contours lead to a wholly satisfying destination." On Metacritic, the film has a weighted average score of 81 out of 100 based on reviews from 19 critics, indicating "universal acclaim".

Jordan Mintzer of The Hollywood Reporter called the film "A highly original and rather touching account of loss, both physical and emotional." Peter Debruge of Variety magazine wrote: "I'd hazard to say it's one of the most original and creative animated features I've ever seen: macabre, of course — how could it be otherwise, given the premise? — but remarkably captivating and unexpectedly poetic in the process."

Actress Laura Dern, who attended the 92nd Academy Awards, where Marc du Pontavice and Jérémy Clapin also attended the ceremony, personally praised the film to them. The film was included in Animation Magazine's 2023 list of the Best Animated Movies of the 21st Century, a selection curated by the magazine itself alongside several animation veterans.

=== Accolades ===
Award	Date of ceremony	Category	Recipients	Result	Ref.
Critics' Week	22 May 2019	Nespresso Grand Prize	Jérémy Clapin	Won	
Annecy International Animated Film Festival	15 June 2019	Cristal for a Feature Film	Jérémy Clapin	Won	
Annecy International Animated Film Festival	15 June 2019	Audience Award/Première	Jérémy Clapin	Won	
Detroit Film Critics Society Awards	9 December 2019	Best Animated Feature	I Lost My Body	Nominated	
San Diego Film Critics Society	9 December 2019	Best Animated Film	I Lost My Body	Won	
Critics Choice Awards	12 January 2020	Best Animated Feature	I Lost My Body	Nominated	
Los Angeles Film Critics Association	12 January 2020	Best Animated Film	Jérémy Clapin	Won	
Los Angeles Film Critics Association	12 January 2020	Best Music Score	Dan Levy	Won	
American Cinema Editors	17 January 2020	Best Edited Animated Feature Film	Benjamin Massoubre	Nominated	
Annie Award	25 January 2020	Best Animated Feature — Independent	Xilam, Netflix Animation	Won	
Annie Award	25 January 2020	Outstanding Achievement for Music in an Animated Feature Production	Dan Levy	Won	
Annie Award	25 January 2020	Outstanding Achievement for Writing in an Animated Feature Production	Jérémy Clapin and Guillaume Laurant	Won	
Academy Awards	9 February 2020	Best Animated Feature	Jérémy Clapin and Marc du Pontavice	Nominated	
César Award	28 February 2020	Best Animated Film	Jérémy Clapin	Won	
César Award	28 February 2020	Best Original Score	Dan Levy	Won	
César Award	28 February 2020	Best Adapted Screenplay	Jérémy Clapin and Guillaume Laurant	Nominated	

== Media ==
=== Home media ===
It was released on DVD, Blu-ray, and for digital purchase by Sony Pictures Home Entertainment France on 6 March 2020, with a making-of featurette included as a bonus.

== See also ==
- I Lost My Body (soundtrack)
