= Daniel Clive McCallum =

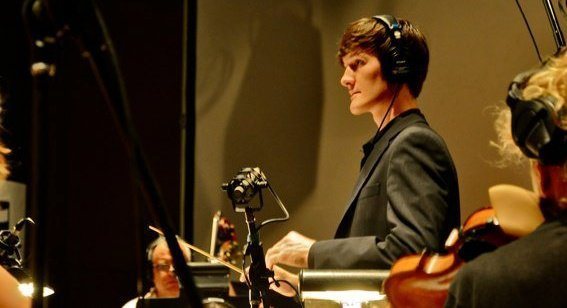

Background information
- Born: Sydney, Australia
- Genres: Film score, classical, experimental
- Occupations: Film music composer, conductor, orchestrator
- Years active: 2007 – present
- Website: danielclivemccallum.com

Daniel Clive McCallum (born 1989 in Sydney, Australia) is a film composer, conductor, and orchestrator. He is a graduate of the Royal Academy of Music in London.

He is known for orchestrating and arranging the music for the 2016 Summer Olympics in Rio de Janeiro, Brazil, which won the Sports Emmy Award for best music direction.

McCallum is the son of two noted Australian legal academics, Ron McCallum and Mary Crock. Ron McCallum is an expert in labour law while Mary Crock is an expert in migration and refugee law.

== Career ==
McCallum left traditional school at the age of 13 to study music at the Sydney Conservatorium of Music. There, he studied musical composition, oboe, conducting, as well as traditional Australian instruments with William Barton. He was awarded the ABRSM scholarship in 2008 to study composition at the Royal Academy of Music. After graduating, McCallum went on to work with Howard Shore on The Hobbit: An Unexpected Journey. McCallum is a prominent and awarded orchestrator. He orchestrated the 2016 Summer Olympics in Rio de Janeiro, Brazil. For this, the production won a Sports Emmy Award. In 2019, McCallum orchestrated the new anthem for La Liga. McCallum was nominated for a Grammy Award in 2020 as part of the String Theory Artist Collective for his work on the album Sekou Andrews & The String Theory.

McCallum has also been commissioned to write many contemporary classical pieces. Notably, his works have been performed by the BBC Singers, the Philharmonia Orchestra, the Omega Ensemble in the Sydney Opera House, the Penrith Symphony Orchestra, the Sydney Sinfionetta, the Sonic Arts Ensemble, the London Contemporary Orchestra, the Crossroads Chamber Festival (performed by Paul Silverthorne), the Choir & Organ magazine, Ars Musica Australis, the Warringah Council, the Chronology Arts Ensemble, and the Royal Academy of Music.

He currently resides in Los Angeles with his wife where he works as a composer.

== Filmography ==
Film
Year	Title	Position
2011	Siegel Hans	Composer
2012	The Hobbit: An Unexpected Journey	Assistant Orchestrator
2014	The Smoke	Orchestrator
2014	The Secret Santa	Composer: Additional Music
2014	Radical Kindness	Composer: Additional Music
2015	The Mentors	Composer
2015	Endless Night	Orchestrator
2015	Palm Trees in the Snow	Orchestrator
2016	2016 Summer Olympics theme in Rio de Janeiro, Brazil	Orchestrator and arranger
2016	No Panic, with a Hint of Hysteria	Orchestrator
2016	Penumbra	Composer
2016	Loving in Limbo	Composer
2016	Realive	Orchestrator
2017	Bruce!!!	Composer
2018	King of Knives	Composer
2018	The Map to Paradise	Composer
2018	The Tree of Blood	Orchestrator
2018	Alegria, Tristeza	Orchestrator
2018	Public Disturbance	Composer: Additional Music
2019	La Liga Theme	Orchestrator and Arranger
2019	Zero	Orchestrator
2019	Farewell	Orchestrator
2019	Three Days of Christmas	Composer: Additional Music, Conductor, Orchestrator
2019	Portrait	Composer
2020	The Crossroad	Composer
2021	Wild Game	Composer
2022	Vindication Swim	Composer
2022	Dance Dads	Composer
2023	Cottonmouth	Composer
2024	Queen of Knives	Composer
2024	The People Before	Composer
2025	Pickleheads	Composer
2025	Secret Santa Project	Composer

== Awards and nominations ==
Award	Category	Nominated work	Result	Ref.
Sports Emmy Award	Best Music Direction (2016)	2016 Summer Olympics in Rio de Janeiro, Brazil	Won	
Independent Shorts Awards	Best Original Score (2019)	Portrait	Won	
Top Indie Film Awards	Best Original Score (2019)	Portrait	Won	
Grammy Award	Best Spoken Word Album (2020)	Sekou Andrews & The String Theory	Nominated	

== Discography ==
- The Map to Paradise (Original Motion Picture Soundtrack)
- Bruce!!!! (Original Motion Picture Soundtrack)
- Loving in Limbo (Original Motion Picture Soundtrack)
- Retrospective, Vol. 1
- Dance Dads (Original Motion Picture Soundtrack)
- Retrospective, Vol. 2
- Our Deadly Vows
- Wild Game (Original Motion Picture Soundtrack)
- Vindication Swim (Original Motion Picture Soundtrack)
