= Bruce!!! =

- Directed by: Eden Marryshow
- Written by: Eden Marryshow; Jesse Wakeman
- Produced by: Cesa Pledger
- Starring: Eden Marryshow; Mlé Chester; Jason Tottenham; Jade Eshete; Cesa Pledger
- Cinematography: Juan Carlos Borrero
- Edited by: Maria Cataldo
- Music by: Daniel Clive McCallum
- Production companies: Pope 3 Enterprises; Lighthearted Films
- Distributed by: Global Digital Releasing
- Release dates: 21 September 2017 (Urbanworld Film Festival); 15 March 2019 (US)
- Running time: 104 minutes
- Country: United States
- Language: English

Bruce!!! is a 2017 American comedy film directed by Eden Marryshow, starring Marryshow, Mlé Chester, Jason Tottenham, Jade Eshete and Cesa Pledger.

== Cast ==
- Eden Marryshow as Bruce
- Mlé Chester as Keira
- Jason Tottenham as Greg
- Jade Eshete as Kerri
- Cesa Pledger as Meredith
- Jamie Dunn as Gwenn
- Gene Pope as Dad
- Christopher Gabriel Núñez as Trevor
- Brenda Thomas
- Mia Dominy as Meryl
- Sasha Dominy as Michelle
- Jean Goto as Theresa
- Ysmael Reyes as Tyler

== Release ==
The film was released on 15 March 2019.

== Reception ==
Chris Salce of Film Threat rated the film 6.5 stars out of 10 and wrote that it "has its moments where it picks up and is funny, but just when it begins to feel like it’s getting hot, it begins to get cold and drags."

Michael Rechtshaffen of the Los Angeles Times wrote that the film "proves stubbornly irredeemable."

Frank Scheck of The Hollywood Reporter wrote that Bruce "ultimately proves far more grating than endearing", and called the film a "slog to endure".

Nick Schager of Variety wrote that while the film "makes a lot of verbal noise", it "says nothing worth remembering."
