= Felicia Pride =

American author, educator, and entrepreneur

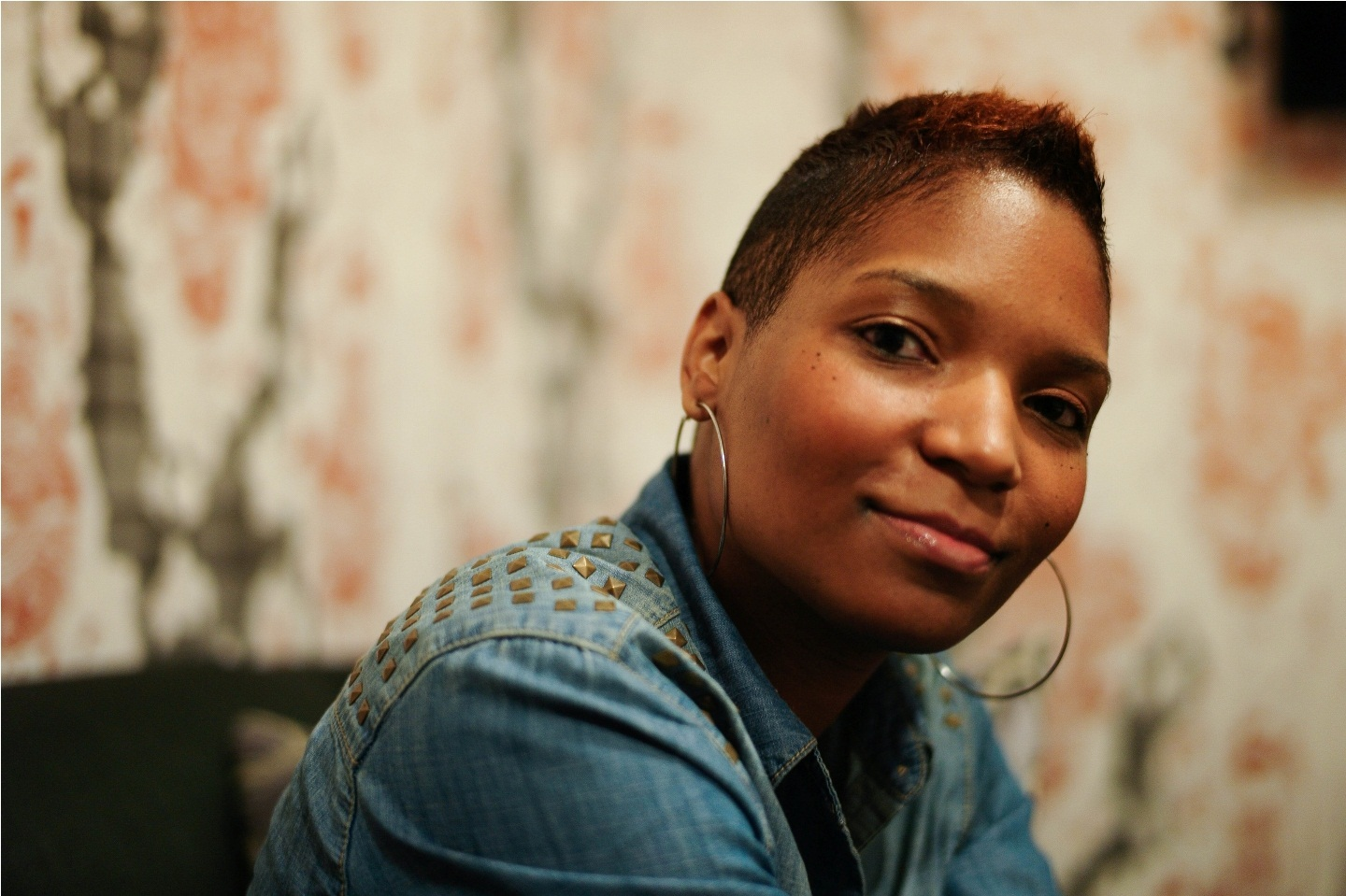
- Pride in 2014
- Born: Baltimore, Maryland, US
- Education: Towson University (BA); Emerson College (MA)
- Occupations: Author, screenwriter, director, producer
- Writing career
- Years active: 2001–present
- Genres: Creative nonfiction, hip-hop, African-American literature, Young adult literature
- Notable work: tender (2020)
- Website: Official website

Felicia Pride is an American author, screenwriter, producer, and director. She is the author of six books, including the young adult novel Patterson Heights. Pride has written for the television shows Queen Sugar and Grey's Anatomy. Her 2020 directorial debut, tender, received the STARZ/Lionsgate Short Film Award at the 2020 BlackStar Film Festival.

== Early life and education ==
Pride was born in 1979 in Baltimore, Maryland. Her family moved to West Orange, New Jersey, when she was young. She lived there until the age of 11, before returning to Baltimore to complete middle and high school. She attended Towson University, where she studied marketing. Pride received her master's degree in writing and publishing from Emerson College in 2005.

== Career ==
=== Books ===
Pride began her writing career in 2001, writing for the community newspaper, Black Reign News, based in Staten Island, New York. Over the period of 15 years, Pride has authored six books. Her motivational book of essays, The Message: Life Lessons from Hip-Hop's Greatest Songs, was published in 2007. The book has been used as a teaching tool in classrooms across the country and was re-issued by NBCUniversal. Her young adult novel, Patterson Heights, was a 2010 American Library Association Pick for Reluctant Readers.

=== TV and film ===
Pride's first written film was the dramatic short The End Again (2014), starring Columbus Short and Tanee McCall, directed by Crystal C. Roberson and co-produced with Latisha Fortune. The film was written as a prequel to the in-production feature film OpenEnded. Pride was selected as a Film Independent Screenwriting Fellow in 2016.

Pride joined her first writer's room for the fourth season of drama series Queen Sugar, and was also the story editor for the show's fifth season. She is also on the writing staff of the 17th season of medical drama TV series Grey's Anatomy.

Her directorial debut was the 2020 short film Tender, about two Black women in the aftermath of a one-night stand. The film received the STARZ/Lionsgate Short Film Award at the 2020 BlackStar Film Festival. That year, Pride also co-wrote and executive produced her first feature drama film, Really Love, which received a Special Jury Recognition for Acting award at SXSW 2020.

In April 2021, it was announced that her romantic drama script, Like It's the Last, is in development by Will Packer and James Lopez, and Pride is also an executive producer on the project.

== Works ==
=== Books ===
- The Message: 100 Life Lessons from Hip-Hop's Greatest Songs (2007)
- Hallway Diaries (2007)
- Everybody Hates Chris: Everybody Hates First Girlfriends (2007)
- Everybody Hates Chris: Everybody Hates School Politics (2008)
- Patterson Heights (2009)
- To Create: Black Writers, Filmmakers, Storytellers, Artists and Media Makers Riff on Art, Careers, Life, and the Beautiful Mess in Between (2012)
- The Message: Life Lessons from Hip-Hop's Greatest Songs (reissued; 2012)
- The Educator's Guide to The Message: A Digital Companion (2012)

=== Short fiction ===
- "Geraldine's Song", in It's All Love: Black Writers on Soul Mates Family and Friends, edited by Marita Golden (2009)

== Filmography ==
=== Film ===
Year	Title	Director	Writer	Producer	Notes
2014	The End Again	No	Yes	Yes	Short film
2020	tender	Yes	Yes	Co-executive	Short film
2020	Really Love	No	Yes	Co-executive	Co-written with Kristi Angel Williams
2023	Look Back at It	Yes	Yes	Yes	Short film

=== Television ===
Year	Title	Creator	Writer	Executive producer	Notes
2019–2021	Queen Sugar	No	Yes	No	
2020–2022	Grey's Anatomy	No	Yes	Producer	
2024–2025	Bel-Air	No	Yes	Co-executive	
2026	A Different World	Yes	Yes	Yes	

== Accolades ==
- 2010 – Quick Picks for Reluctant Young Readers, American Library Association (for Patterson Heights)
- 2013 – Media Fellow at the Center for Media & Social Impact, American University
- 2013 – Writers in School Resident, PEN/Faulkner Foundation
- 2016 – Screenwriting Fellow, Film Independent
- 2017 – Writers on the Verge, NBC

== Awards and nominations ==
Year	Award	Category	Work	Result
2020	BlackStar Film Festival	STARZ/Lionsgate Short Film Award	tender	Won
