= Game of Aces =

- Theatrical release poster
- Directed by: Damien Lay
- Written by: Damien Lay
- Produced by: Carolyn Frichot
- Starring: Chris Klein; Victoria Summer; Werner Daehn
- Cinematography: Mark Christian
- Edited by: Damien Lay; Taylor Smith
- Music by: Chris Morgan
- Production companies: Layfilm; Waterproof Pictures
- Distributed by: Synergetic Distribution
- Release date: September 2, 2016
- Running time: 97 minutes
- Country: United States
- Languages: English and German with English subtitles
- Budget: $500,000

Game of Aces is a 2016 World War I action film written and directed by Damien Lay, in his debut in helming a fiction feature. The film stars Chris Klein, Victoria Summer and Werner Daehn whose role is as a German double-agent with all of his dialogue in German with English subtitles; Summer also speaks German for most of the film.

== Plot ==
In 1918, British General Rupert Graves III (Randy Oglesby) recruits Eleanor Morgan (Victoria Summer), an English nurse and translator to help locate and bring back a top German pilot who has crashed in Egypt. Morgan is teamed with Capt. Jackson Cove (Chris Klein), an American pilot flying for the British Allied forces who will navigate to the remote crash site. Cove has been grounded due to his alcoholism leading to crashing nine aircraft.

During the trek across the Sahara Desert, Cove and Morgan strike up an unlikely partnership as they search for Capt. Josef von Zimmerman (Werner Daehn), an ace who killed Cove's younger brother in aerial combat. Apparently von Zimmermann has become a traitor and is offering to give the British some valuable intelligence.

When Morgan and Cove finally locate von Zimmermann, he is badly injured and suffering from amnesia. With the daunting task of getting back to Cairo ahead of them, the trio are pitted against each other in an elaborate and deadly game of deception and survival. The arrival of a German pilot in a Fokker Dr.1 triplane fighter leads to a climatic conclusion to their epic struggles. British actress, Sarah Lynn Dawson, also appears in the film as British Nurse Patricia Evans. The twist ending, hints at the possibility of a sequel.

== Cast ==
- Chris Klein as Captain Jackson Cove
- Victoria Summer as Nurse Eleanor Morgan
- Werner Daehn as Josef von Zimmermann
- Randy Oglesby as General Rupert Graves III
- Sarah Lynn Dawson as Patricia Evans
- Guido Foehrweisser as German Pilot
- Arthur Kleinpell as Driver

== Production ==
Game of Aces is a film that reportedly cost just $500,000. Principal photography took place at the Dumont Dunes near Death Valley National Park, bordering Nevada and California. Along with replica Royal Aircraft Factory S.E.5 fighters, two Fokker Dr.1 replicas were featured although one example was a crashed aircraft. The German triplane was one of the most identifiable aircraft of World War I.

== Reception ==
Game of Aces was released in select theaters on September 2, 2016. Reviewers noted that the low-budget production had a gripping opening sequence but bogged down in the convoluted plot twists of the last half. Steven Wright in his review for Slant Magazine, noted: "Each facet of its spare construction—only three main characters, one unified setting, and a timespan of around a day—reflects a canny, utilitarian approach to both plot and budget."
