= I Lost My Body (soundtrack) =

I Lost My Body (Original Motion Picture Soundtrack)

Film score by Dan Levy
- Released: 8 November 2019
- Recorded: 2019
- Studio: Studio Watchtower, Mandeville, Eure; L'Obsidienne Studios, Paris
- Genre: Film score
- Length: 50:24
- Label: Lakeshore
- Producer: Dan Levy

Dan Levy chronology
| I Lost My Body (2019) | Star Wars: Visions (2021) |

I Lost My Body (Original Motion Picture Soundtrack) is the film score to the 2019 film of the same name directed by Jérémy Clapin. The original score is composed by Dan Levy and released through Lakeshore Records on 8 November 2019. For his work, Levy received the Annie Award for Outstanding Achievement for Music in a Feature Production.

== Development ==
Dan Levy of the indie-pop band the Dø composed the film score for I Lost My Body. Clapin was focused on the film's music, using it as a tool to raise the day-to-day urban context into "something mystical, cosmic". Having liked Levy's work and his sense of melody as well as natural and electronic arrangements, he considered him to be the perfect fit.

Levy wrote the first theme, which was the theme of the destiny "with the hand [called Rosalie] and the melody of the childhood flashback in black-and-white". While Levy wanted to use flute, Clapin instead wanted a completely synthesized score with an ambient music, though he eventually won him over his decision. Levy further wanted melody and strings for the love story between Naofel and Gabrielle, where he had to fight for his decision.

In the first scene, where the lovers meet in her apartment lobby and talk through intercom, he used synthesizers woven into the strings. However, as Naofel follows Gabrielle to the subway and library, he found it tough due to the background noise of metro, which led him to convince Clapin that he needed love music else Naofel will be viewed as a stalker from the audience's perspective. But, Clapin was adamant that the journey of the hand through Paris should be more "abstract, textured, and harsh" and required an emotional dimension, conveyed through synthesizers. At this point, the discussion of blending score and sound design were integral.

Levy recalled on how Clapin asked for "a lot of descending [synthesizer] for the sequences with the hand" but he did not realize that he was talking about sound design. Later, he discussed with the sound team which he found to be interesting owing to the back-and-forth process of how music and sound blend together. He noted on how the process became more melodic and organic, seamlessly flowing through the editing pattern. Thus, the use of strings and synthesizers formed the film's musical palette.

== Reception ==
Thor Joachim Haga of Celluloid Tunes wrote "overall, it's a score that perfectly mirrors Naofel's qualms. Somewhat detached, but hovering over the story like a gust from the past, or an aural spirit, call it what you will." Daniya Jawwad of Cherwell wrote "The music, by Dan Levy, matches the melancholic (and unsettling) undertones of the film and greatly complements certain scenes, such as those from Naofel's childhood, making them unbearably bittersweet for the viewer as we come to learn the fate of Naofel's parents."

Mark Kermode of The Guardian wrote "A gorgeous electronic score by Dan Levy completes the picture, emphasising the romantic themes of longing and loss, tugging upon our heartstrings without resort to sentimentality." David Ehrlich of IndieWire wrote "Dan Levy's phenomenal score helps sweep you right along with him, as it thrums with plaintive beauty from start to finish, alternating between spectral ambience and percussive discord like two melodies racing to find each other before the music stops."

Peter Debruge of Variety and Bilge Ebiri of Vulture called it a "mesmerizing" and "lovely" score. Carlos Aguilar of TheWrap wrote "the entire film is enveloped in a musical blanket knitted from the astral notes of Dan Levy's atmospheric score. His electronic harmonies encapsulate what one imagines floating in the immensity of the universe might sound like. It's grand in an outer-space scope, but emotionally rousing, so much that when paired with pivotal sequences it could prompt tears."

David Fear of Rolling Stone wrote "Huge shout-out to composer Dan Levy, whose techno-propulsive score switches moods on a dime yet also keeps a sense of consistency running throughout." Rafael Motamayor of /Film called it an "electronic, impressionistic score" adding that "[Levy's] electronic harmonies infusing the film with sci-fi tones and tragic orchestration that somehow perfectly encapsulates all of life's experiences."

Christopher Inoa of Thrillist called it a "spellbinding score composed by Dan Levy—a mixture of classical piano, electronic, and French hip-hop—a distinctive mixture of styles that amplifies the film's dream-like, melancholic tone." Kambole Campbell of NME wrote "Throughout all of these moments, Dan Levy's score evokes painful longing – a beautiful and dramatic theme played over memories shared by Naoufel and the disembodied hand."

== Track listing ==
| No. | Title | Artist(s) | Length |
|---|---|---|---|
| 1. | "J'ai perdu mon corps" | | 2:44 |
| 2. | "Intuition" | | 3:05 |
| 3. | "That Night" | | 1:36 |
| 4. | "A Hand in the City" | | 3:06 |
| 5. | "Memories" | | 1:16 |
| 6. | "Fluorescent" | | 1:59 |
| 7. | "You're the One S+C+A+R+R" | | 2:47 |
| 8. | "Horizon" | | 2:08 |
| 9. | "Igloo" | | 3:44 |
| 10. | "Suburban" | | 2:21 |
| 11. | "Camtar" | feat. Swan | 1:26 |
| 12. | "Rosalie" | | 3:13 |
| 13. | "Intercom" | | 2:57 |
| 14. | "Music Box" | | 1:05 |
| 15. | "Sale soirée" | feat. L'Ordre Du Périph | 2:06 |
| 16. | "Fly's Fate" | | 3:59 |
| 17. | "Snow" | | 2:28 |
| 18. | "End Credits Alternative" (Bonus Track) | | 2:30 |
| 19. | "I'm Here" (Bonus Track) | | 2:45 |
| 20. | "La complainte du soleil" | Laura Cahen | 3:09 |
| Total length: | | | 50:24 |

== Personnel ==
Credits adapted from liner notes:

- Music composer, producer and programming – Dan Levy
- Orchestra – Sinfonia Pop Orchestra Quartet
- Recording – Dan Levy, Rémi Barbot, Molly
- Mixing – Dan Levy, Rémi Barbot
- Mastering – Chab, Didier Perrin
- Music supervision – Pierre-Marie Dru
- Production manager – Tony Giles
- Orchestra ontractor – Flore Commandeur, Jean-Philippe Fournier
- Administrative contractor – Don Smith, Erica Pope
- Midi transcription and session preparation – Cécile Coutelier
- Executive producer – Brian McNelis, Darren Blumenthal, Tara Finegan
- A&R – Eric Craig
- Art direction – John Bergin

Instruments

- Cello – Alexis Derouin
- Keyboards, guitar, bass guitar, flute – Dan Levy
- Viola – Jean-Philippe Fournier
- Violin – Lucile Kasedo, Ryo Kojima

== Accolades ==
| Award | Date of ceremony | Category | Recipients | Result | Ref. |
|---|---|---|---|---|---|
| Annie Award | 25 January 2020 | Outstanding Achievement for Music in an Animated Feature Production | Dan Levy | Won | |
| César Award | 28 February 2020 | Best Original Score | Dan Levy | Won | |
| Hollywood Music in Media Awards | 29 January 2020 | Best Original Score – Animated Film | Dan Levy | Nominated | |
| International Film Music Critics Association | 9 December 2019 | Best Original Score for an Animated Film | Dan Levy | Nominated | |
| Los Angeles Film Critics Association | 12 January 2020 | Best Music Score | Dan Levy | Won | |
| Sitges Film Festival | 15 June 2019 | Best Original Music | Dan Levy | Won | |
