= Vindication Swim =

2024 biographical drama film

- Directed by: Elliott Hasler
- Written by: Elliott Hasler
- Starring: Kirsten Callaghan; John Locke; Victoria Summer
- Music by: Daniel Clive McCallum
- Production companies: Relsah Films; Sea High Productions; Arden Entertainment
- Distributed by: Picnik Entertainment
- Release date: 8 March 2024
- Country: United Kingdom
- Language: English

Vindication Swim is a 2024 biographical drama film about swimmer Mercedes Gleitze, who in 1927 became the first British woman to swim the English Channel. The film is written and directed by Elliott Hasler, starring Kirsten Callaghan in the lead role with John Locke playing her coach and Victoria Summer as a rival swimmer.

The film is produced by Relsah Films in association with Sea High Productions, Arden Entertainment and distributed by Picnik Entertainment. It was released in the UK and Ireland on 8 March 2024.

== Premise ==
Vindication Swim depicts the story of Mercedes Gleitze, who in 1927 became the first British woman to swim the English Channel. The film portrays Gleitze’s upstream struggle in overcoming both the cold waters of the English Channel and the oppressive society of 1920s Britain. However, after a rival comes forward claiming to have accomplished the same feat, Mercedes is forced into battle to retain her record and her legacy.

== Cast ==
- Kirsten Callaghan as Mercedes Gleitze
- John Locke as Harold Best
- Victoria Summer as Edith Gade
- Douglas Hodge as The Newsreader
- James Wilby as Mr. Havers
- John Tolputt as Sir Arthur Coleridge
- Sam Bullen as P.J. Templeton
- Mike Skinner as Dr. H.W. Phillips
- Matthew Wyn Davies as Corentin Charboneau
- Anthony Arundell as Chairman Michael Read
- David Aitchison as Samuel Huntington
- Owen Oldroyd as Office Manager
- Justin Hayward as Leonard Clay
- Russell Shaw as Policeman
- Michael Cronin as Steamship Captain
- Melodie Tyrer as Gertrude Ederle
- Billy Reid as Pub Landlord
- Tim Loughton as Sir William Joynson-Hicks

== Production ==
It was announced in 2018 that Hasler was writing a screenplay based around Mercedes Gleitze's 1927 attempt to become the first British woman to swim the English Channel, and that he intended for this to be his next project following the completion of his first feature WWII: The Long Road Home. John Locke was cast as Gleitze's coach, Harold Best, and sat in on auditions for the role of Gleitze. Kirsten Callaghan was cast as Mercedes Gleitze in June 2019.

Filming began on 12 August 2019 for the swimming sequences in the English Channel off the coast of Newhaven. At the end of September, filming of on-land exteriors and interiors took place across Sussex, which was delayed multiple times due to the COVID-19 pandemic. Filming locations include Brighton, Eastbourne, Lewes, Hastings and Worthing. Additional scenes were also shot in Birmingham. Filming eventually wrapped in June 2021.

In November 2020, it was reported by Deadline that actress Victoria Summer had joined the production as Edith Gade, a rival swimmer who attempts to usurp Gleitze's record. In January 2022, Variety reported that actors Douglas Hodge and James Wilby had also joined the cast. The film is being scored by Daniel Clive McCallum.

== Release ==
The film is distributed by Picnik Entertainment and was released theatrically in the UK and Ireland on 8 March 2024.
