= Randy Oglesby =

American actor (born 1949)

- Born: Thomas Randell Oglesby; 1949 (age 76–77)
- Occupation: Actor
- Years active: 1981–present

Thomas Randell Oglesby (born 1949) is an American actor, best known for his recurring role as Degra on Star Trek: Enterprise. He is also known for his other Star Trek roles, including captain Trena'L in the Star Trek: Enterprise episode "Unexpected", the Miradorn twins, Ah-Kel and Ro-Kel, in the Star Trek: Deep Space Nine episode "Vortex", Silaran Prin in "The Darkness and the Light" and as the telepathic alien Kir in "Counterpoint", a season 5 episode of Star Trek: Voyager.

== Career ==
Oglesby played Professor Seidel in the Angel episode "Supersymmetry".

On Star Trek: The Next Generation, Season 2 Episode 5, "Loud as a Whisper", aired January 9, 1989, he played one of three Interpreters known as Riva's Chorus.

Oglesby appeared in Independence Day (1996) as Mike Dodge. His most memorable moment is asking Randy Quaid if the aliens, who he claimed abducted him, did any "sexual things".

In 2000, he made a guest appearance as Reverend Mackee in the seventh season episode "Signs and Wonders" of The X-Files, and as Joshua Vinten (the manager of formalwear rental shop) on the second last episode of TV series Columbo (Murder With Too Many Notes).

Oglesby made a guest appearance on the ABC soap opera, General Hospital in the role of Huell on July 17, 2007. In the same year he played Bethlehem Steel executive Walter Veith in the Mad Men episode "New Amsterdam".

He played Tom Jeter's father in Studio 60 on the Sunset Strip.

In 2011, Oglesby played the role of Capt. Lachlan McKelty in the video game L.A. Noire, that was developed by Team Bondi and Rockstar Games.

In 2017, Oglesby played the role of Asa Leopold in the Netflix limited series Godless.

In 2021, he appeared as Dr. Stan Nielson in episode 3 of the Marvel Studios television miniseries WandaVision.

== Filmography ==
=== Film ===
| Year | Title | Role | Notes |
|---|---|---|---|
| 1985 | Pale Rider | Elam | |
| 1988 | Bad Dreams | Cynthia's Policeman | |
| 1993 | The Hit List | Det. Wilcher | |
| 1995 | Candyman: Farewell to the Flesh | Heyward Sullivan | |
| 1996 | Independence Day | Mechanic | |
| 1997 | Liar Liar | Detective Bryson | |
| 1997 | Nothing to Lose | Sheriff Earl | |
| 1998 | Patch Adams | Pinstriped Man | |
| 1999 | Idle Hands | Sheriff Buchanan | |
| 2000 | A Question of Faith | Eustace | |
| 2001 | Pearl Harbor | Strategic Analyst | |
| 2002 | We Were Soldiers | Lt. Col. List | Uncredited |
| 2003 | Bringing Down the House | FBI Agent | |
| 2005 | The Island | Harvest Surgeon | |
| 2005 | Shopgirl | Tom | |
| 2008 | The Onion Movie | Surgeon General | |
| 2010 | Unthinkable | Mr. Bradley | |
| 2012 | Argo | Pat Horan | Uncredited |
| 2013 | The Lone Ranger | Shareholder | |
| 2016 | Game of Aces | General Rupert Graves III | |

=== Television ===
| Year | Title | Role | Notes |
|---|---|---|---|
| 2021 | WandaVision | Dr. Stan Nielson | Episode: "Now in Color" |
| 2022, 2026 | For All Mankind | Jim Bragg | 9 episodes |
| 2026 | The 'Burbs | Bill Festersen | 7 episodes |
| 2026 | Spider-Noir | Chief McNamara | 3 episodes |
