= Really Love (film) =

2020 film by Angel Kristi Williams

- Directed by: Angel Kristi Williams
- Written by: Felicia Pride; Angel Kristi Williams
- Screenplay by: Felicia Pride
- Produced by: Mel Jones; Charles D. King; Kim Roth; Aaliyah Williams; Angel Kristi Williams
- Starring: Kofi Siriboe; Yootha Wong-Loi-Sing; Uzo Aduba; Mack Wilds; Naturi Naughton; Suzzanne Douglas; Jade Eshete; Blair Underwood; Michael Ealy
- Cinematography: Shawn Peters
- Edited by: Steven Pristin; Brian Ufberg
- Music by: Khari Mateen
- Production companies: MACRO; Homegrown Productions
- Distributed by: Netflix
- Release dates: October 15, 2020 (AFI Film Festival); August 25, 2021 (Netflix)
- Running time: 95 minutes
- Country: United States
- Language: English

Really Love is a 2020 American romantic drama film directed by Angel Kristi Williams and co-written with Felicia Pride. The film, starring Kofi Siriboe and Yootha Wong-Loi-Sing, is set in Washington, D.C., and centers the romance between struggling artist Isaiah Maxwell and ambitious law student Stevie Richmond.

Really Love debuted in October 2020 at AFI Film Festival. It received mainly positive critical reception and leads Wong-Loi-Sing and Siriboe received a Special Jury Recognition for Acting at South by Southwest.

== Plot ==
At an art show of his colleague Jusef Davis in Washington, D.C., struggling Black painter Isaiah Maxwell meets gallery owner Chenai Hungwe, who invites him to produce a piece for a future show. He also meets Stevie Richmond, with whom he instantly connects.

Their moment passes, but soon after Isaiah's longtime friend Nick and Nick's girlfriend Mecca introduce them formerly, as the two women are friends from Howard University. They stay out until the morning. Isaiah and Stevie shyly talk about themselves on the walk to her place, she explaining she is a law student at Georgetown University. They share their numbers upon their goodbye.

At the group show, although Isaiah's friends and colleagues are impressed, Chenai is less so. Isaiah feels deflated, but Stevie encourages him and invites him to move in.

Without telling her parents they are living together, Stevie takes Isaiah home to meet her family. They ask him about his background and financial prospects, and her mother speaks disapprovingly of her daughter's plan to be a lawyer for disadvantaged people. However, Isaiah defends her. Stevie blurts out that they are living together and her parents are not pleased.

After meeting Stevie's parents, Isaiah becomes very absorbed in his work, as the painter tries to break into the competitive art world. They inspired him to focus on painting, so that they will see him as successful. Stevie is upset about how little time he has for her.

Isaiah's long hours in the studio finally pay off. Chenai comes to see a piece, so he explains a bit about his interpretation of his work. By the end, she grants him a solo show. Isaiah and Stevie celebrate that night over dinner.

Stevie gets a potential offer for work from a Chicago law firm, just after. Isaiah stands for up for a ballet performance. Later on he apologizes, explaining he got engrossed in his painting and forgot. Stevie says it is no big deal, however, later on she tells him she is going to an interview in Chicago for a job.

Isaiah's solo show is a success and he gets a large check to show it. Stevie tells Isaiah her interview went well and the law firm in Chicago is offering her a job. When she asks him what he thinks, he says if she is following her dreams then she should go ahead. In the evening they have a big fight, ending with him leaving.

A year passes, and Nick stops by to see Isaiah. He asks if he has had contact with Stevie, which he has not. They say they are going to meet up, however Isaiah says he first needs to go with some of his pieces to a show in Chicago.

At the show, Stevie shows up with Ahmad and sees Isaiah's painting. Isaiah comes by to say hello. They acknowledge each other, but neither admit to their past connection.

When Isaiah has a new solo show in DC, he invites Stevie to it. They meet out for drinks and continue to have a connection. Isaiah asks Stevie if she is happy which she refuses to answer. The next morning, Stevie wakes up in Isaiah's bed.

Although Isaiah and Stevie have strong feelings for each other, she later leaves. Talking to her mother, she explains that love can be great, but sometimes it only lasts a season. Stevie goes to Isaiah's show and sees the huge portrait he made of her. The screen then fades to black.

== Cast ==
- Kofi Siriboe as Isaiah Maxwell, a struggling artist
- Yootha Wong-Loi-Sing as Stevie Richmond, an ambitious law student
- Blair Underwood as Jerome Richmond, Stevie's Father
- Uzo Aduba as Chenai Hungwe
- Mack Wilds as Nick Wright, Isaiah's friend since childhood
- Naturi Naughton as Sicily Richmond, Stevie's cousin
- Suzzanne Douglas as Anne Richmond, Stevie's mother
- Michael Ealy as Yusef Davis, Isaiah's colleague
- Jade Eshete as Mecca Gerima
- GoldLink as himself

== Production ==
Really Love is director Angel Kristi Williams' feature film debut and Felicia Pride's debut screenplay. The two met through a mutual friend, after which Pride showed Williams the Really Love screenplay and invited her to direct the project.

Williams stated that she was inspired by films including In the Mood For Love, Blue Valentine, and Love Jones. The production designer was Nathan Parker and the cinematographer was Shawn Peters. It was produced and financed by Homegrown Pictures and Charles D. King's production company MACRO. The artwork done by Isaiah in the film was created by artists Gerald Lovell, Chanel Compton, and Ronald Jackson.

On July 8, 2018 it was announced that Kofi Siriboe was cast in a lead role in the film. Uzo Aduba, Naturi Naughton, Tristan Wilds, Yootha Wong-Loi-Sing, and Jade Eshete were announced as cast members on July 26, 2018. Michael Ealy was announced on July 31, 2018. The film is one of the last projects completed by Suzzanne Douglas prior to her death in 2021.

The film was shot beginning in July 2018 on-location in Washington, D.C., as well as in Baltimore, Williams' hometown. Shooting locations included the Baltimore Museum of Art, the Baltimore School for the Arts, the Parkway Theatre, Dovecote Cafe, and Williams' grandmother's home in Park Heights.

== Release ==
The film was originally set to premiere at South by Southwest in March 2020. However, after the festival was cancelled due to the COVID-19 pandemic, it debuted at AFI's virtual film festival in October 2020. Really Love began streaming on Netflix on August 25, 2021.

== Soundtrack ==
The official soundtrack with an original jazz score composed by Khari Mateen was released on September 17, 2021. Screenwriter Felicia Pride said the soundtrack's ambiance was influenced by tracks like "Sumthin Sumthin (Mellosmoothe)" by Maxwell from the film Love Jones. Ari Lennox, Kamasi Washington, Christian Scott aTunde Adjuah, and others appear in Really Love.

== Reception ==
Really Love received positive reception. On the review aggregator website Rotten Tomatoes, 86% of 7 critics' reviews are positive, with an average rating of 6.8/10.

In a review for Film Threat, Alex Saveliev compared the film to If Beale Street Could Talk and praised it as a "gentle, poignant examination of two young people at the dawn of self-discovery". In a similarly positive review, Robert Daniels wrote for The Playlist, "“Really Love” is a timeless black romance. Kristi Williams is an assured new voice already nestling herself inside audiences’ hearts."

== Awards and nominations ==
=== 2020 SXSW ===
- Nominee, Grand Jury Award for Narrative Feature – Angel Kristi Williams
- Winners, Special Jury Recognition for Acting – Yootha Wong-Loi-Sing and Kofi Siriboe
