= WWII: The Long Road Home =

2017 biographical drama adventure film

WWII: The Long Road Home is a 2017 World War II biographical drama adventure film written and directed by Elliott Hasler. Created between the ages of 14 and 16 whilst Hasler was still at school, the film centres on the story of his own great-grandfather's experiences as an escaped prisoner of war in Italy. Released when Hasler was 16, WWII: The Long Road Home premiered at the Brighton and Edinburgh festivals in 2017 and was praised by critics for the vision of the project in relation to Hasler's age.

The film was produced by Relsah Films and distributed by 101 Films International and 3 Wolves.

== Plot ==
Private Charlie Standing of the Royal Hampshire Regiment is stationed at a remote outpost at Cuckmere Haven, overlooking the Seven Sisters along the south coast of England. He cycles back to Brighton where he meets his soon-to-be-wife Ivy 'Tup' Standing for a countryside picnic. A montage shows the development of their relationship and the birth of their son, Terry. Charlie hears from fellow soldier Private Andrew Grimes they are to be sent to North Africa. A distraught Tup confronts Charlie the night before he leaves and he vows he'll return home, unlike his father who was killed in World War I.

Near Sidi Nsir in Tunisia Charlie and Grimes are ordered to participate in a risky reconnaissance mission as a prelude to the anticipated arrival of German soldiers. They depart in a Jeep under the command of Captain Thompson and Sergeant Milton, who are killed in an encounter with the Germans, forcing Charlie and Grimes to surrender. They are transported as prisoners of war to a camp in Capua, Southern Italy where they're held in poor conditions and plagued by boredom. After British victory in the North African Campaign, the prisoners are transported north to Laterina, Tuscany and informed by the Italian Commander of Italy's decision to capitulate. As a result, the POWs are now free but instructed by the British Camp Commander, Major Rawford, to await the Allies' arrival at the camp. Charlie unsuccessfully pleads with Grimes to flee the camp with him, and departs alone. In England, Tup flips through letters marked return-to-sender and ponders her husband's fate.

Charlie traverses the Italian countryside, alone. He steals food from a farmhouse and finally encounters two Italian peasants who offer to help him. As winter approaches, Charlie is forced into the mountains by approaching Germans. When a German stumbles across his hiding place in a remote cave, Charlie is forced to kill him. When the area is bombed that night, Charlie decides to move on. When he falls ill and collapses in a forest, he's rescued by a mute Italian shepherd, Giovanni, who nurses him back to health and escorts him to the convent in Viterbo to wait out the winter. He writes to Tup, lamenting the cost of the war and its destruction of the beauty surrounding him. Charlie is forced back on the run when Germans catch up once more. Back home, Tup briefly dates a Canadian officer, Michael Romero, but breaks it off, feeling guilty.

After summer arrives Charlie is joined by a lone Italian partisan, Aldo, who seeks revenge for the death of his family at the hands of the fascists. Their friendly travels end when Charlie discovers Aldo hanged from a tree and German soldiers chase Charlie into the forest where he's forced to surrender. A sudden artillery bombardment allows him to escape and a war-weary and bedraggled Charlie is rescued by American soldiers.

Tup and Terry are on hand as Charlie arrives home aboard a warship. Charlie watches the Victory in Europe Day celebrations in Trafalgar Square, then struggles to adjust to life back in England. Emotionally detached from his wife and son, and focused on his job with the railway, he writes a letter to Tup apologising for his actions and declaring his wish to be with her.

In 1999, an older Tup reads the letter and then places it into his coffin with the rest of his letters. She travels to Cuckmere Haven to scatter the ashes, pauses to look over the white cliffs, reminiscing about a trip there with Charlie and Terry after the war. She then turns and walks away.

== Cast ==
- Elliott Hasler as Private Charlie Standing
- Alice Rogers as Ivy 'Tup' Standing
- David Aitchison as Private Andrew Grimes
- Luigi Patti Del Pirano Li-Castri as Aldo
- Mike Skinner as Captain Thompson
- Owen Oldroyd as Sergeant Milton
- Eamonn Breen as Major Rawford
- Pete Walsh as Michael Romero
- David Hasler as Giovanni

== Production ==
=== Writing ===
Hasler began writing the film at the age of fourteen, having been making short films since the age of ten. Having never met his great-grandfather who died in 1999 (a year before Hasler was born), much of the story was passed down to him by his grandfather in the form of small stories about Charlie Standing's escapades. Hasler has stated how these stories captured his imagination and were what led to his decision to make the film.

The script was completed in the summer of 2014 and filming began in October of that year.

=== Filming ===
Filming began on 25 October 2014 in Turkey. Hasler was on holiday there at the time and as he was starring in the film decided to shoot scenes there for the film. Due to the three year production on the film, this process was also replicated in Italy, Spain and France, with the latter country providing locations for crucial scenes for the winter sections of the film. The majority of filming took place in Brighton, England and the surrounding area in Sussex. Because of the low budget nature of the film and as Hasler was still a schoolboy, the cast is composed of non-professional actors, made up of family and friends. Scenes were shot at Pippingford Park in July 2016, which also served as a location on the television series Band of Brothers.

Filming wrapped in March 2017 after three years of production. Hasler edited the film himself and the score was composed by musician Jamie Scarratt, who was also 16 at the time of production.

== Release and reception ==
The film premiered in May 2017 at the Brighton Fringe Festival, the hometown of Hasler, selling out six of seven screenings under the original title of Charlie's Letters. In August 2017 the film was shown as part of the Edinburgh Fringe Festival. The film was also shown as part of a special screening for veterans of the battle of Sidi Nsir at the Vue cinema in Southampton.

In 2020 the film was picked up for distribution by 101 Films International and retitled to WWII: The Long Road Home. It was given a home video and VOD release in the United Kingdom in October 2020 and received US distribution in February 2021.

=== Critical response ===
WWII: The Long Road Home was praised critics for the scope and scale of the production in relation to Hasler's age and the film's low budget. Tim Walker of The New European called the film "glossy and assured".

Critic David Luhrssen wrote the film "makes decent use of its modest budget, avoiding SFX and big set pieces through careful editing and camera angles and use of sound". While Culture Trip's Graham Fuller called it "a miracle achievement for a schoolboy director".
