= Victoria Summer =

British singer-songwriter

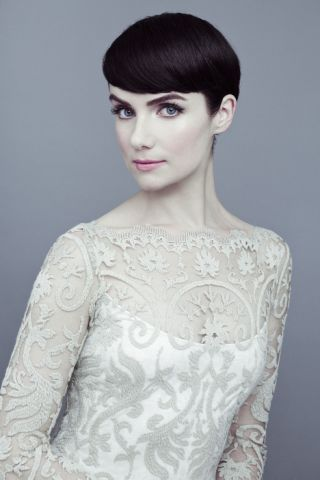
- Born: 15 December 1981 (age 44); Reading, Berkshire, England
- Citizenship: United Kingdom; United States
- Occupations: Actress; model; singer; songwriter
- Years active: 2006—present
- Spouse: Fabrizio Vaccaro (m. 2023)
- Website: victoriasummer.com

Victoria Summer (born 15 December 1981) is a British actress, singer, and producer. She began her career in West End musicals in London, with her first musical at the Almeida Theatre in Brighton Rock, directed by Michael Attenborough. Summer transitioned into film and television, gaining recognition for her portrayal of Julie Andrews in Saving Mr. Banks, a 2013 film about the making of Mary Poppins.

== Career ==
Summer started her career with a scholarship to the Arts Educational School in London and appeared in the Golden Jubilee of Queen Elizabeth II in 2002.

She began in musical theatre before transitioning into film, with early roles in commercials and independent films. Summer landed her first role in the 2006 film The Zombie Diaries, which the Weinstein Company picked up for distribution. She relocated to Los Angeles in 2009 and secured the lead role in Dracula Reborn.

In 2010, Summer starred in a Subaru commercial for Spike TV, which debuted at the 2010 Scream Awards.

In 2011, she was cast as a British teacher with anger management issues in the Brian Herzlinger film How Sweet It Is. She released her debut single, "Love Will Have to Wait," later that year.

Summer played Julie Andrews in the Disney film Saving Mr. Banks. She also played lead role in the action film Ratapocalypse (formerly titled Higher Mission) opposite Casper Van Dien, in which she performed her original song "Truth Hurts."

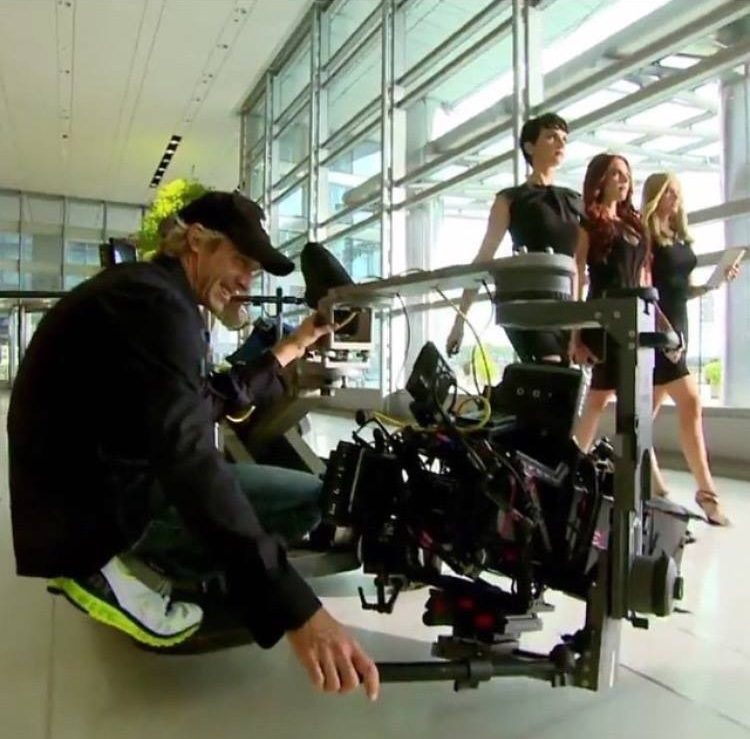
Michael Bay filming Transformers: Age of Extinction; actresses Abigail Klein, Melanie Specht, and Victoria Summer are walking in a corridor.

She appeared in Transformers: Age of Extinction as one of three executive assistants to Stanley Tucci's character. Summer also starred in Game of Aces (2016) as British nurse Eleanor Morgan opposite Chris Klein. In 2018, she played Kitty in Garlic and Gunpowder and also performed an original song she wrote live on set for the film.

In 2024, she played Edith Gade in Vindication Swim, a biopic about swimmer Mercedes Gleitze, for which she won Best Supporting Actress at both the Portugal Film Festival and the Brazil Film Festival.

== Personal life ==
Summer was born in Reading, Berkshire, England. She is an advocate for children's causes and a supporter of animal rights, acting as a spokesperson for veganism with PETA.

Summer is an ambassador for Teen Cancer America and hosts charity events called "Tea with Victoria Summer." She also champions children's causes and founded the Next Gen Role Model initiative.

In July 2020, Summer announced her engagement to Italian-born Michelin-star chef, Fabrizio Vaccaro. They got married on 22 May 2023 in Italy. Summer later became an American citizen

== Filmography ==
Year	Film	Role	Notes
2006	The Zombie Diaries	Leeann	as Victoria Nalder
2012	Dracula Reborn	Lina Harker	Drama / Horror
2013	How Sweet It Is	Kristina	
2013	Saving Mr. Banks	Julie Andrews	
2014	Transformers: Age of Extinction	Joshua's Assistant	
2014	Bar Union	Patricia Brand	Short film
2015	Higher Mission	Polina	
2016	Terrordactyl	Teresa	
2016	Game of Aces	Eleanor Morgan	Directed by Damien Lay
2017	Garlic & Gunpowder	Kitty	Comedy
2020	I Am Fear	Alicia Minnette	Horror / Thriller / War
2024	Vindication Swim	Edith Gade	

== Television ==
Year	Film	Role	Notes
2020	Glow & Darkness	Victoire	

== Awards ==
- 2024, FARO International Film Festival: Best Supporting Actress for Vindication Swim
