= Mercedes Gleitze =

British swimmer (1900–1981)

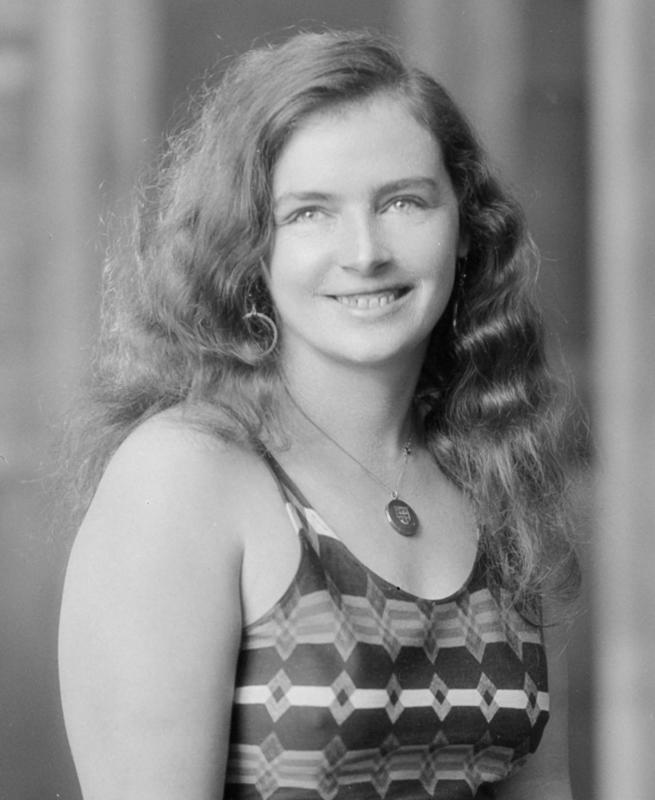
- Mercedes Gleitze in 1930.
- Born: 18 November 1900; Brighton, England
- Died: 9 February 1981 (aged 80); London, England
- Occupation: Professional swimmer
- Known for: Swimming records and founding a charity
- Spouse: Patrick Joseph Carey (m. 1930)
- Children: 3

Mercedes Carey (née Gleitze; 18 November 1900 – 9 February 1981) was a British professional swimmer. She was the first known person to swim the Straits of Gibraltar and the first British woman to swim the English Channel. The name of Mercedes Gleitze was used to market Rolex's new waterproof case, the "Oyster". She established endurance records for swimming including a record of 46 hours in 1932. She was able to raise funds to found the Mercedes Gleitze Homes in Leicester via sponsorship. The Mercedes Gleitze charity is now linked to the Family Action charity.

== Early life ==
Mercedes Gleitze was born to Heinrich and Anna (née Kurr) in 1900 in the English south-coastal town of Brighton. Her father was a German immigrant from the county of Göttingen who worked as a baker and her mother taught languages. She and her two elder sisters spent time with her grandparents in Herzogenaurach in Bavaria and two years studying at the Maria Stern Convent School in Nördlingen.

== Swimming achievements ==
With her bilingual background and education, Gleitze became a secretary and stenographer in central London, exploiting her talent for languages. In her spare time, she started swimming in the River Thames.

Gleitze made her first attempt to swim the English Channel on 3 August 1922. She entered the water from Shakespeare Beach in Dover at 7:30 am. However, rough seas and severe shoulder pain forced her to abandon the swim after three and a quarter hours, having covered about six miles. Her first significant record was for endurance after 10 hr 45 min swimming in the Thames. This was the longest time for a woman in 1923.

At the eighth attempt, she became the first British woman to swim the Channel, on 7 October 1927. The record was in doubt when, in the following days, another woman, Dr Dorothy Cochrane Logan (using her professional name, Mona McLennan), claimed to have swum the channel faster. Her version of events proved to be a fabrication, but the effect of this hoax undermined Gleitze's claim.

Under pressure from the media she agreed to undertake a "vindication swim" even though the water was much colder than when Channel swimming is normally attempted. Gleitze failed to complete the swim but her endurance of the cold convinced all that the original record should stand. Gleitze made not only her name but also that of Rolex's Oyster watch. The watch withstood her second swim and this was used to launch an advertising campaign in Britain. Rolex still uses Gleitze's name in their publicity.

In August 1929, Gleitze swam along part of the northern coastline of Ulster in the north of Ireland. She swam from the Pilot's Station at Shrove (pronounced 'Shroove'), a coastal hamlet near Greencastle in Inishowen in the north of County Donegal, south-eastwards across to Portstewart, a small town on the coast of County Londonderry, on 17 August 1929. This feat involved swimming across the mouth of Lough Foyle. She made the return swim on 20 August 1929, this time swimming from Portstewart across to Black Rock Bay near Moville in Inishowen.

Gleitze was usually sponsored for these record attempts, and she was able to open the first Mercedes Gleitze Home in 1933. This was a large house in Leicester that was converted into flats for homeless families. She was supported in her work by the Rotary Club which was undertaking a scheme to move unemployed people from the north of England to Leicester where they could find work. Gleitze continued to break records and she became the first known person to swim the Straits of Gibraltar between Europe and Africa on 6 April 1928.

Gleitze travelled to Australia, New Zealand and South Africa to establish new records for swimming. Besides swimming the 100 miles around the Isle of Man and becoming the first person to swim to Robben Island and back to Cape Town, she also staged feats of endurance swimming.

When she first took the endurance swimming record it stood at 26 hours. Over several years she extended this record in public swimming baths where crowds would attend and encourage her by singing together.

Gleitze married engineer Patrick Carey in Dover in 1930 with the American swimming twins Bernice and Phyllis Zittenfeld as bridesmaids. The ceremony was covered by British newsreels where Gleitze announced that she was off to swim the Hellespont instead of going on honeymoon. Gleitze continued to extend her endurance record to 45 hours the following year. In 1932 she retired after again extending the record finally to 46 hours.

== Endorsements ==
Gleitze gathered a large number of companies who were keen to be associated with her achievements. Consumers were asked to toast her with Paddy Whiskey when they were not drinking Lipton's Tea, which had reputedly helped her "beat the channel". She appeared at a corset demonstration for Kellett's and at the showing of the, now lost, 1927 silent film Swim Girl, Swim, which starred Bebe Daniels and a fellow swimmer Gertrude Ederle. There were unproductive rumours that Gleitze might star in a film. Gleitze also recommended Be-ze-be honey and bathing caps as well as her enduring role as a brand ambassador for Rolex watches.

== Celebrity ==
Gleitze became a celebrity and she was regularly the subject of stories. The newspaper that most adopted a tabloid approach to her was the Daily Mirror that hinted that Gleitze was using her charity's funds inappropriately. The paper challenged the charity to allow its accounts to be audited and offered to pay for the cost. The papers also reported on believed or invented stories of rivalry between Gleitze and other swimmers. Millie Hudson, who went with her to Gibraltar, was said to be a rival, and Gleitze was said to have annoyed Lottie Shoemmell, who was an American swimmer, by refusing to race her across the Channel.

== Later life ==
After her retirement from swimming, Gleitze became a housewife, had three children, and became increasingly reclusive, lying about her past to her neighbours and not discussing her achievements with her family. She died aged 80, on 9 February 1981, in London.

== Legacy ==
Besides her three children and many swimming records, Gleitze founded several homes that were used by homeless British people during the 1930s. In 1939 they were used for homeless Czech people. The buildings were destroyed in Second World War bombing in 1940; however, an organisation continues to administer her charity and it continues Gleitze's desire to alleviate the effects of homelessness.

Rolex still use Gleitze's achievement (2023) in their publicity. In 2010 the Rolex company ran adverts featuring swimming the channel, their watch, and the figure of a woman in a swimming costume. The advert did not mention Gleitze, nor did it mention that she did not complete a Channel swim whilst wearing the watch. The advert showed the swimmer wearing the watch on her wrist, although when Gleitze attempted to carry the watch across the Channel she had it tied around her neck. In 2023, her name and a picture of her emerging from water clutching a bag and goggles were featured in advertisements for Rolex alongside those of Lara Gut-Behrami, Iga Swiatek, Sonya Yoncheva, Grace Kelly, Sylvia Earle, Lexi Thompson, Khoudia Toure and Yuja Wang.

In January 2022, a blue plaque for Gleitze was unveiled at her birthplace in Freshfield Road, Brighton.

In March 2024, the film Vindication Swim, about Gleitze's 1927 English Channel swim, was released. It was written and directed by Elliott Hasler, and starred Kirsten Callaghan as Gleitze.
