= Sarah Lynn Dawson =

American actress

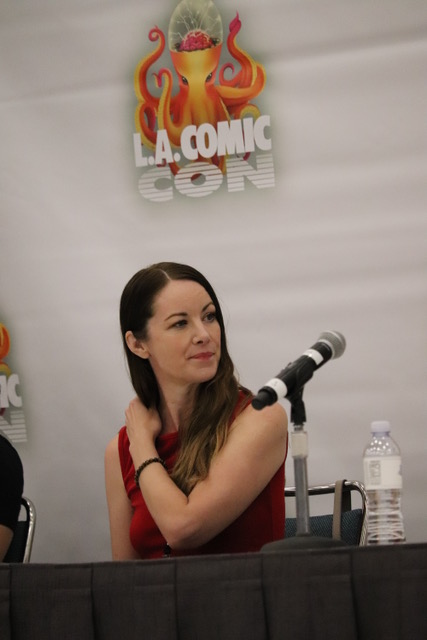
- Dawson in 2019
- Born: England
- Occupations: Actress, writer
- Years active: 2009–present
- Website: www.sarahlynndawson.com

Sarah Lynn Dawson is an English actress and filmmaker.

== Early life ==
She lived in The Lake District in England. and she also spent a large part of her childhood in Qatar, in the Middle East where she started acting at the age of seven when she was cast in a community theatre show. She was in the local theatre companies’ productions and danced ballet and tap. She also made films as a child. She went to a boarding school in the UK where she was in more theatre productions and she later attended the University of Leeds, where she received a BA Hons Degree in Sociology.

== Career ==
Sarah studied acting at the Lee Strasberg Theatre and Film Institute in New York on their two year Acting Certificate Program. Whilst in New York she acted in the Off-Broadway show 'Men' and in the Off-Broadway show 'Conflict' at The Producers Club.

She was cast in the award-winning indie film Folklore, directed by Justin Calen Chenn upon moving to LA. She produced, wrote and starred in the film Duality which is voiced by Deepak Chopra and also stars Jon Foo and Don Most and features music by Moby. Duality was an Official Selection of the Hollyshorts Film Festival in 2015. She also produced and starred in the 1940s noir short Unsolved, Directed by Julia Camara. She appeared in the film Game of Aces as British Nurse, Patricia Evans. The film was directed by Damien Lay and stars Chris Klein.

She voiced the character of The Mother in the English dub of the animated film I Lost My Body which was nominated for an Academy Award in 2020. The film was Directed by Jérémy Clapin and the main character Naoufel was voiced by English Actor Dev Patel The film also was nominated for and won several other major awards including an Annie Award and a César Award.

She co-created the podcast 'Stepping into Shakespeare' with Therese Theurillat which airs on all major podcast channels. The podcast explores the plays of Shakespeare. She was a featured artist in The Future of Humanity Exhibition in Davos in 2025, with her film work. She also was a part of The Future of Humanity Experience in Art Basel in June 2025.

== Filmography ==
=== Acting Roles ===
Year	Title	Role	Notes
2009	A Guy and a Girl	Sonja	Short film
2012	Girls Night Out	Vienna	
2012	Folklore	Angela Hay	
2012	Sh*t British People Say in the USA	Sarah	Viral
2013	The C Gate	Clare	Short film
2014	Close Up	The Leading Lady	Short film
	Cesar Millan's Socialization	Narration	Documentary
2015	Unsolved	Alice Clark	
2015	Duality	Emerald	Short film
2015	Violence	Patricia Simms	
2016	Sanctuary	Emily	
2016	Game of Aces	Patricia Evans	
2018	Forever Not Maybe	Silvia	
2019	I Lost My Body	The Mother (voice)	English dub
2020	Caller ID	Ms. Jameson	
2022	Love in the Time of Pandemic	Angie	
2022	Exit	Narrated by	Documentary
2024	Insidious	Shelly	
2025	Nexel	Ash	
2025	The Rules	Mysterious Teacher	
2026	Automatic For the People	Aria	

=== Films Directed ===
Year	Title	Director	Writer	Producer	Notes
2009	A Guy and a Girl	No	No	Yes	Short film
2012	Girls Night Out	Yes	Yes	Yes	Short film
2012	Sh*t British People Say in the USA	Yes	Yes	Yes	Viral
2014	Duality	No	Yes	Yes	Short film
2015	Unsolved	No	No	Yes	Short film
2020	Caller ID	Yes	Yes	Yes	Short film
2026	I Am Not A Robot	Yes	Yes	Yes	
