= Elliott Hasler =

English film director and screenwriter

Elliott Simon Hasler (born 29 July 2000) is an English film director and screenwriter. Hasler is best known for the biopic Vindication Swim, which centres around the story of Mercedes Gleitze and her attempt to become the first British woman to swim the English Channel.

== Career ==
Having never received any formal teaching in relation to filmmaking, Hasler began his career aged 14 with the production of WWII: The Long Road Home. The film took three years to make and was made while Hasler was still at school. The film centred upon the story of Hasler's great-grandfather who was an escaped prisoner of war in Italy during World War II and was completed in 2017, when Hasler was 16 years old. WWII: The Long Road Home was released to critical praise, citing the scope and scale of the project in relation to Hasler's age. Critic Graham Fuller described Hasler as "maybe the next Spielberg", calling the film "a miracle achievement for a schoolboy director", and Tim Walker of The New European called the film "glossy and assured".

In 2017, Hasler founded the UK based independent film company, Relsah Films, through which his subsequent films have been produced.

Following WWII: The Long Road Home, Hasler made a series of short films, including To Hunt a Tiger, which was shot in Sri Lanka at the same locations as David Lean's The Bridge on the River Kwai. The film premiered in July 2019 at Soneva Jani's over-water cinema in the Maldives.

In August 2019, production began on Vindication Swim, written and directed by Hasler, which centres on the story of swimmer Mercedes Gleitze and her 1927 English Channel swim, starring Kirsten Callaghan as Gleitze. To capture the swimming sequences as realistically as possible, Hasler insisted everything was shot on the English Channel itself. Speaking to ITV News, Hasler stated "Everything you see out at sea, is in the English Channel. There's no tanks, no blue screens, this is all for real. And Kirsten Callaghan, who plays Mercedes, is in the water doing all of her own stunts. There are no body doubles, there is no fakery at all." Hasler spoke of the immense challenges involved in basing a production out on the English Channel with the BBC's Ben Brown, recalling "being in the water with the camera" trying to film Callaghan's performance.

== Personal life ==
Hasler was born in Brighton, England. He is of Italian descent on his father's side and studied history at Exeter University.

== Filmography ==
Year	Film	Director	Writer	Notes
2019	WWII: The Long Road Home	Yes	Yes	Also actor
2019	To Hunt a Tiger	Yes	Yes	Short film
2024	Vindication Swim	Yes	Yes	
Est 2027	The Hidden War	Yes		
