= Kirsten Callaghan =

British Actress (born 1991)

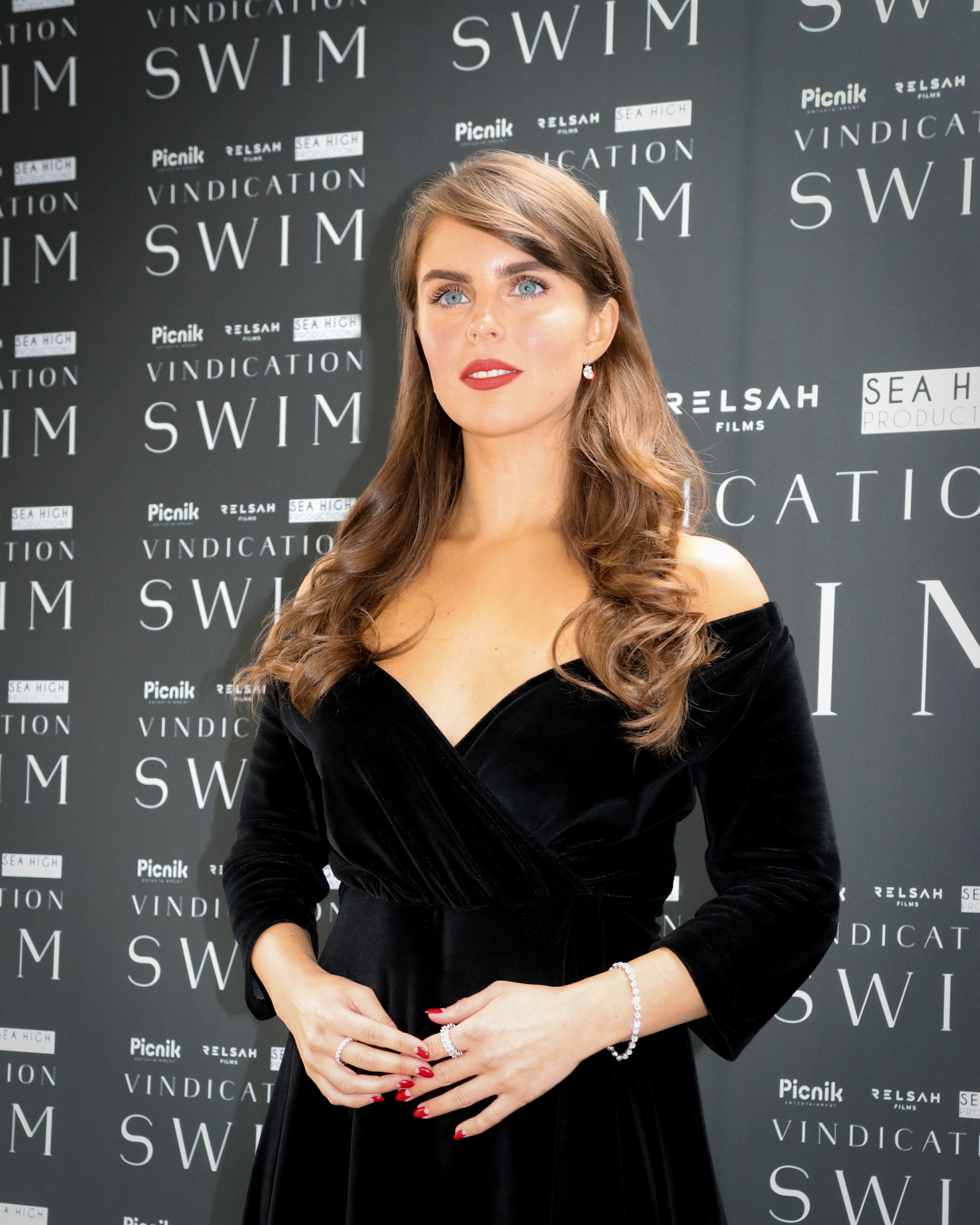
- Kirsten Callaghan at CINECITY Brighton Film Festival 2022
- Born: 7 June 1991 (age 35); Brighton
- Education: Rose Bruford College
- Occupations: Actress and Playwright

Kirsten Sarah Callaghan (born 7 June 1991 in Brighton) is a British-Irish actress and playwright. She is best known for her lead role as swimmer Mercedes Gleitze in the 2024 biopic Vindication Swim.

== Early life and education ==
Kirsten Sarah Callaghan graduated from Rose Bruford College in 2015.

== Career ==
Callaghan began her career on stage, writing, and performing in one-woman show L'amour est mort, based on the French folktale Bluebeard, which was chosen to be performed at the London Symposium Festival.

In 2016, Callaghan was cast as Noël Olivier in Nick Baldock's historical play Verge of Strife, and then in the lead role of Thomas Clancy's play, Pussy.

In 2019 Callaghan was cast as the lead role in the biopic Vindication Swim. The film, written and directed by Elliott Hasler, portrays the story of Mercedes Gleitze, who in 1927 became the first British woman to swim the English Channel. Callaghan spent three years training and filming for the swimming scenes, which were all filmed in the English Channel itself. Besides starring in the film, Callaghan also served as executive producer on the project, alongside producers Nicola Pearcey, Sally Humphreys, Douglas McJannet, and Simon Hasler. Vindication Swim was released in 2024 and marks Callaghan's feature film debut.

== Filmography ==
Year	Film	Actor	Producer	Notes
2022	Vindication Swim	Yes	Yes	
