= The Whip (2024 film) =

2024 film

- Poster
- Directed by: Christopher Presswell
- Written by: Forgács W. András; Christopher Presswell
- Starring: Shian Denovan; Gala Wesson; Tom Knight; Daniel Davids; Ray Bullock Jnr.
- Music by: Jonathan Armandary
- Production company: Workbus
- Distributed by: Workbus (theatrical); Indie Rights (VOD)
- Release date: 4 September 2024 (United Kingdom)
- Running time: 82 minutes
- Country: United Kingdom
- Language: English

The Whip is a 2024 British heist film starring Shian Denovan, Gala Wesson, Tom Knight, Daniel Davids and Ray Bullock Jnr. The film centres on a full-time carer who plots a daring heist from the Houses of Parliament, in a bid to thwart devastating welfare reforms known as Independence Credit.

Directed by Christopher Presswell, it was released in the United Kingdom on 4 September 2024.

== Cast ==
- Shian Denovan as Sadie Baxter
- Gala Wesson as Abi Munroe
- Tom Knight as Michael Harrington
- Daniel Davids as Jason Grant
- Ray Bullock Jnr. as Damian Wilson

== Release ==
On 28 June 2024, it was announced that “The Whip” would screen at select UK cinemas beginning 4 September, premiering at the Genesis Cinema, East London, before a planned VOD release later in the year. The news was accompanied by the release of the film's first poster and trailer.
