= List of horror films of 2025 =

This is a list of horror films that were released in 2025. This list includes films that are classified as horror, as well as other subgenres. They are listed in alphabetical order.

== Highest-grossing horror films of 2025 ==
Highest-grossing horror films of 2025
Rank	Title	Distributor	Worldwide gross	Ref.
1	Demon Slayer: Kimetsu no Yaiba – The Movie: Infinity Castle	Aniplex / Toho / Crunchyroll	$793.6 million	
2	The Conjuring: Last Rites	Warner Bros. Pictures	$499.3 million	
3	Sinners	Warner Bros. Pictures	$370.5 million	
4	Final Destination Bloodlines	Warner Bros. Pictures	$317.8 million	
5	Weapons	Warner Bros. Pictures	$270.1 million	
6	Five Nights at Freddy's 2	Universal Pictures	$239.6 million	
7	Chainsaw Man – The Movie: Reze Arc	Toho / Crunchyroll / Sony Pictures Releasing	$191.4 million	
8	28 Years Later	Sony Pictures Releasing	$151.4 million	
9	Black Phone 2	Universal Pictures	$132.7 million	
10	The Monkey	Neon	$68.9 million	

== Films ==
Horror films released in 2025
Title	Director	Cast	Country	Subgenre	Ref.
28 Years Later	Danny Boyle	Alfie Williams, Aaron Taylor-Johnson, Jodie Comer, Ralph Fiennes, Jack O'Connell, Erin Kellyman	United Kingdom; United States	Post-apocalyptic horror	
213 Bones	Jeffrey Primm	Colin Egglesfield, Dean Cameron, Liam Woodrum	United States	Horror, Slasher	
825 Forest Road	Stephen Cognetti	Elizabeth Vermilyea, Kathryn Miller, Joe Bandelli, Joe Falcone, Madeleine Garcia, Brian Anthony Wilson	United States	Supernatural Horror	
Abraham's Boys	Natasha Kermani	Titus Welliver, Jocelin Donahue, Judah Mackey, Aurora Perrineau, Brady Hepner	United States	Horror	
Alpha	Julia Ducournau	Tahar Rahim, Golshifteh Farahani, Mélissa Boros	France, Belgium	Body Horror	
Amityville VR	Matt Jaissle	Lien Mya Nguyen Oost, Rudy Ledbetter, Jeffrey Hylton	United States	Horror	
Anaconda	Tom Gormican	Jack Black, Paul Rudd	United States	Comedy horror	
Appofeniacs	Chris Marrs Piliero	Aaron Holliday, Jermaine Fowler, Sean Gunn	United States	Horror, Slasher	
Ash	Flying Lotus	Eiza González, Aaron Paul, Iko Uwais, Beulah Koale, Kate Elliott, Flying Lotus	United States	Science fiction Horror	
Attack 13	Taweewat Wantha	Korranid Laosubinprasoet, Veerinsara Tangkitsuvanich, Nichapalak Thongkham	Thailand	Horror	
Baramulla	Aditya Suhas Jambhale	Manav Kaul Bhasha Sumbli	India	Supernatural Horror	
Bambi: The Reckoning	Dan Allen	Roxanne McKee, Nicola Wright, Tom Mulheron, Samira Mighty	United Kingdom	Slasher	
Beast of War	Kiah Roache-Turner	Mark Coles Smith, Joel Nankervis, Sam Delich, Lee Tiger Halley	Australia	Monster Horror	
Beheading	Sok Leng	Sahrah Pich Manika, Keo Bora, Soriya Khon	Cambodia	Horror Thriller	
Bitter Souls	Tom Ryan	Avaryana Rose, Destiny Leilani Brown, Michael Hargrove, Michael McKeever	United States	Supernatural Horror	
Black Phone 2	Scott Derrickson	Mason Thames, Madeleine McGraw, Ethan Hawke, Jeremy Davies, Miguel Cazarez Mora	United States	Supernatural horror	
Bloat	Pablo Absento	Ben McKenzie, Bojana Novakovic, Sawyer Jones, Malcolm Fuller, Kane Kosugi	United States, Japan, France	Screenlife Horror	
Bone Face	Michael Donovan Horn	Elena Sanchez, Jeremy London, Alli Hart	United States	Horror Thriller Mystery	
Bone Lake	Mercedes Bryce Morgan	Maddie Hasson, Alex Roe, Andra Nechita, Marco Pigossi	United States	Horror Thriller	
Borderline	Jimmy Warden	Samara Weaving, Ray Nicholson, Jimmie Fails, Alba Baptista, Eric Dane	United States	Home invasion Comedy thriller	
Borley Rectory: The Awakening	Steven M. Smith	Julian Glover, Patsy Kensit, Helen Lederer	United Kingdom	Supernatural Horror Mystery	
Bring Her Back	Danny and Michael Philippou	Sally Hawkins, Billy Barratt, Jonah Wren Phillips, Sally-Anne Upton, Stephen Phillips, Sora Wong, Liam Damons	Australia	Horror	
Call of the Dead	Dyan Sunu Prastowo	Nirina Zubir, Nugie, Mutia Datau	Indonesia	Folk Horror	
Chainsaw Man – The Movie: Reze Arc	Tatsuya Yoshihara	Kikunosuke Toya, Reina Ueda, Fairouz Ai, Tomori Kusunoki, Shogo Sakata	Japan	Dark Fantasy, Horror Comedy	
Chhorii 2	Vishal Furia	Nushrratt Bharuccha, Soha Ali Khan, Gashmeer Mahajani	India	Horror	
Clown in a Cornfield	Eli Craig	Katie Douglas, Kevin Durand, Will Sasso, Cassandra Potenza, Aaron Abrams	United States	Slasher Horror	
Companion	Drew Hancock	Jack Quaid, Harvey Guillén, Lukas Gage, Megan Suri, Sophie Thatcher, Rupert Friend	United States	Sci-fi horror	
C.O.G.	Tommy Savas	Piper Curda, Josh Zuckerman, Noel Fisher	United States	Sci-fi thriller	
Coyotes	Colin Minihan	Justin Long, Kate Bosworth, Mila Harris, Katherine McNamara, Brittany Allen, Keir O'Donnell, Norbert Leo Butz	United States	Comedy horror Thriller	
Crazy Old Lady	Martín Mauregui	Carmen Maura, Daniel Hendler	Spain, Argentina, United States	Psychological Horror Thriller	
Dangerous Animals	Sean Byrne	Hassie Harrison, Josh Heuston, Rob Carlton, Ella Newton, Liam Greinke, Jai Courtney	Australia, Canada, United States	Survival horror	
Dark Nuns	Kwon Hyeok-jae	Song Hye-kyo, Jeon Yeo-been, Lee Jin-wook, Moon Woo-jin	South Korea	Supernatural thriller	
Death of a Unicorn	Alex Scharfman	Paul Rudd, Jenna Ortega, Richard E. Grant, Téa Leoni, Will Poulter	United States	Comedy horror	
Death Whisperer 3	Narit Yuvaboon, Thanadet Pradit	Nadech Kugimiya, Denise Jelilcha Kapuan, Natcha Nina Jessica Padovan, Kajbhandit Jaidee, Peerakrit Pacharabunyakiat, Ong-art Jeamjaroenpornkul, Pramet Noi-am, Arisara Wongchalee	Thailand	Supernatural HorrorK	
Deathstalker	Steven Kostanski	Daniel Bernhardt, Patton Oswalt, Christina Orjalo, Paul Lazenby, Nina Bergman	Canada, United States	Sword and Sorcery Horror	
Deemak	Rafay Rashdi	Faysal Qureshi, Sonya Hussain, Sameena Peerzada, Bushra Ansari, Javed Sheikh	Pakistan	Horror Family Drama	
Demon Slayer: Kimetsu no Yaiba – The Movie: Infinity Castle	Haruo Sotozaki	Natsuki Hanae, Akari Kitō, Yoshitsugu Matsuoka, Hiro Shimono, Saori Hayami	Japan	Animated Dark fantasy Action	
Demon Spawn	Rob Roy	Aaron Crocker, David Patrick Wittle, Michelle Middleton, Carrie Moore	United States	Horror	
Descendent	Peter Cilella	Ross Marquand, Sarah Bolger	United States	Science Fiction Thriller	
Destroy This Tape	Carter Folkes, Sean McGarry	Hannah Brennen, Eero McNeilly	Canada	Horror Thriller	
Die'ced: Reloaded	Jeremy Rudd	Eden Campbell, Jason Brooks, Nigel Vonas	United States	Slasher	
Diés Iraé	Rahul Sadasivan	Pranav Mohanlal,Gibin Gopinath	India	Horror, Thriller	
Disforia	Christopher Cartagena González	Claudia Salas, Fariba Sheikhan, Noah Casas, Eloy Azorín, Kike Guaza	Spain	Horror, Thriller	
Dollhouse	Shinobu Yaguchi	Kōji Seto, Tetsushi Tanaka, Ken Yasuda, Jun Fubuki, Totoka Honda, Aoi Ikemura, Masami Nagasawa	Japan	Supernatural Horror	
Dolly	Rod Blackhurst	Fabianne Therese, Russ Tiller, Michalina Scorzelli, Kate Cobb, Ethan Suplee, Seann William Scott, Max the Impaler	United States	Horror	
Dorothea	Chad Ferrin	Susan Priver, Pat McNeely, Ezra Buzzington	United States	Crime Horror	
Dracula	Luc Besson	Caleb Landry Jones, Christoph Waltz, Matilda De Angelis	France, United Kingdom	Gothic Horror	
Drop	Christopher Landon	Meghann Fahy, Brandon Sklenar, Jeffery Self, Gabrielle Ryan Spring, Violett Beane, Jacob Robinson, Ed Weeks	United States	Horror thriller	
Exit 8	Genki Kawamura	Kazunari Ninomiya, Yamato Kochi, Naru Asanuma, Kotone Hanase, Nana Komatsu	Japan	Psychological horror	
Eye for an Eye	Colin Tilley	Whitney Peak, Laken Giles, S. Epatha Merkerson, Golda Rosheuvel, Finn Bennett	United States	Horror	
F*** Marry Kill	Laura Murphy	Lucy Hale, Virginia Gardner, Brooke Nevin	United States	Comedy Thriller	
Fear Below	Matthew Holmes	Hermione Corfield, Jake Ryan, Jacob Junior Nayinggul, Arthur Angel, Josh McConville, Maximillian Johnson, Clayton Watson	Australia	Action adventure horror	
Fear Street: Prom Queen	Matt Palmer	India Fowler, Suzanna Son, Fina Strazza, David Iacono, Ella Rubin, Chris Klein, Ariana Greenblatt, Lili Taylor, Katherine Waterston	United States	Horror	
Final Destination Bloodlines	Zach Lipovsky, Adam Stein	Kaitlyn Santa Juana, Teo Briones, Brec Bassinger, Tony Todd	United States	Supernatural horror	
Five Nights at Freddy's 2	Emma Tammi	Josh Hutcherson, Elizabeth Lail, Piper Rubio, Matthew Lillard	United States	Supernatural horror	
Flush	Grégory Morin	Rémy Adriaens, Christophe Bier, Elliot Jenicot	France	Comedy horror	
Forgive Us All	Jordana Stott	Lily Sullivan, Callan Mulvey, Richard Roxburgh	New Zealand	Neo-Western, Apocalyptic Horror	
For Sale by Exorcist	Melissa LaMartina	Helenmary Ball, Julian Ball, Emily Classen, John Dimes, Tatiana Ford	United States	Comedy horror	
Frankenstein	Guillermo del Toro	Oscar Isaac, Jacob Elordi, Mia Goth, Lars Mikkelsen, David Bradley, Christian Convery, Charles Dance, Christoph Waltz, Felix Kammerer	United States	Gothic Science Fiction Horror	
Fuck My Son!	Todd Rohal	Tipper Newton, Steve Little, Robert Longstreet, Kynzie Colmery, Macon Blair	United States	Exploitation Comedy	
Garden of Eden	Marcel Walz	Robert Rusler, Monique Parent, Sarah French, Sarah Polednak, Sarah Nicklin, Dazelle Yvette	United States	Horror	
Ghost Train	Tak Se-woong	Joo Hyun-young, Jeon Bae-soo, Choi Bo-min	South Korea	Mystery Horror	
Good Boy	Ben Leonberg	Larry Fessenden, Arielle Friedman, Shane Jensen, Stuart Rudin, Indy	United States	Supernatural horror	
Halabala	Eakasit Thairaat	Chantavit Dhanasevi, Nuttanicha Dungwattanawanich, Anon Saisangcharn	Thailand	Folk Horror	
Hallow Road	Babak Anvari	Rosamund Pike, Matthew Rhys, Megan McDonnell	Czech Republic, Ireland, United Kingdom	Psychological Thriller	
Haunted House of Pancakes	Nathan Dalton	Fabian Guerrero, Jada Krueger, Patrick Johnston, Chris De Christopher, Jason Crowe	United States	Comedy Horror	
Haunting of Mount Gede	Azhar Kinoi Lubis	Arla Ailani, Adzana Ashel, Endy Arfian	Indonesia	Folk horror	
Heart Eyes	Josh Ruben	Olivia Holt, Mason Gooding, Gigi Zumbado, Michaela Watkins, Devon Sawa, Jordana Brewster	United States	Romantic comedy Slasher	
Hellcat	Brock Bodell	Dakota Gorman, Todd Terry	United States	Horror, Thriller	
Hell House LLC: Lineage	Stephen Cognetti	Elizabeth Vermilyea, Searra Sawka, Mike Sutton, Joe Bandelli	United States	Found footage Horror	
Hidden in the Dark	Kristian Gatto	Donka Avramova, Marco Benedetti, Velizar Binev	Bulgaria	Supernatural Horror	
Him	Justin Tipping	Marlon Wayans, Tyriq Withers, Julia Fox, Tim Heidecker, Jim Jefferies, Guapdad 4000, Tierra Whack	United States	Sports horror	
Hoba (The Vile)	Majid Al Ansari	Bdoor Mohammad, Sarah Taibah, Iman Tarik, Jasem Alkharraz, Samira Al Wahaibi	United States, United Arab Emirates	Drama, Horror	
Hold the Fort	William Bagley	Chris Mayers, Levi Burdick, Julian Smith	United States	Comedy Horror	
The Holy Boy	Paolo Strippoli	Michele Riondino, Giulio Feltri, Paolo Pierobon, Romana Maggiora Vergano, Sergio Romano, Roberto Citran	Italy	Horror	
Holy Ghost	Shravan Tiwari	Jenn Osborne, Cleve Langdale, Aaron Blomberg, Maya Adler,	United States	Supernatural horror	
Holy Night: Demon Hunters	Lim Dae-hee	Ma Dong-seok, Seohyun, Lee David, Kyung Soo-jin, Jung Ji-so	South Korea	Action Horror	
Home Sweet Home Rebirth	Alex & Steffen	William Moseley, Michele Morrone, Urassaya Sperbund, Alexander Lee	Thailand, United States	Supernatural horror	
House on Eden	Kris Collins	Kris Collins, Celina Myers, Jason-Christopher Mayer, Carrie Kidd, Barb Thomas	United States	Found footage, Horror	
Human Hibachi 3: The Last Supper	Mario Cerrito	Debbie Rochon, Lloyd Kaufman, Jeff Alpert, Wataru Nishida, Mario Cerrito, Stafford Chavis	United States	Found footage Horror Exploitation	
I Am Frankelda	Arturo and Roy Ambriz	Mireya Mendoza, Arturo Mercado Jr., Luis Leonardo Suárez, Carlos Segundo, Beto Castillo, Assira Abbate, Anahí Allué, Arturo Ambriz, Lourdes Ambriz, Roy Ambriz, Antonio Badía, Sergio Carranza, Jesse Conde, Idzi Dulkiewicz, Karla Falcón, Magda Giner, Juan Pablo Monterrubio, Habana Zoe	Mexico	Supernatural comedy horror	
I Know What You Did Last Summer	Jennifer Kaytin Robinson	Freddie Prinze Jr., Jennifer Love Hewitt, Billy Campbell, Madelyn Cline, Jonah Hauer-King, Sarah Pidgeon, Tyriq Withers, Chase Sui Wonders	United States	Slasher	
Ick	Joseph Kahn	Brandon Routh, Malina Weissman, Harrison Cone, Jeff Fahey, Mena Suvari	United Arab Emirates, United States	Science fiction Comedy horror	
In Our Blood	Pedro Kos	Brittany O'Grady, E. J. Bonilla, Krisha Fairchild, Alanna Ubach	United States	Found Footage Horror	
Incarnation	Roh Hong-jin	Stephanie Lee, Kim Tae-yeon, Lee Shin Sung, Kim Mi-sook	South Korea	Supernatural Horror	
Influencers	Kurtis David Harder	Cassandra Naud, Georgina Campbell, Jonathan Whitesell, Lisa Delamar, Veronica Long, Dylan Playfair	United States	Horror Thriller	
Inthralled	Douglas Bankston	Annie Sullivan, Alanna Hamill Newton, Kelcey Watson	United States	Horror Thriller	
Into the Deep	Christian Sesma	Callum McGowan, Scout Taylor-Compton, Jon Seda, Stuart Townsend, Richard Dreyfuss	United States	Thriller	
Isolated	Benedict Mique	Joel Torre, Yassi Pressman	Philippines	Horror	
It Ends	Alexander Ullom	Phinehas Yoon, Akira Jackson, Noah Toth, Mitchell Cole	United States	Horror	
It Feeds	Chad Archibald	Ashley Greene, Shawn Ashmore, Ellie O'Brien, Juno Rinaldi	Canada	Supernatural Horror	
Jalan Pulang	Jeropoint	Shareefa Daanish, Sujiwo Tejo, Luna Maya, Taskya Namya, Teuku Rifnu Wikana, Kiki Narendra, Ruth Marini, Saskia Chadwick, Raffan Al Aryan, Jajang C. Noer	Indonesia	Supernatural Horror Drama	
Jeongbu	Topel Lee	Aljur Abrenica, Ritz Azul, Empress Schuck	Philippines	Horror	
Jujutsu Kaisen: Execution	Shouta Goshozono, Yôsuke Takada	Shigeru Chiba, Junya Enoki, Wataru Hatano	Japan	Adventure Horror Dark Fantasy	
Keeper	Oz Perkins	Tatiana Maslany, Rossif Sutherland	United States	Horror	
Killing Faith	Ned Crowley	Guy Pearce, DeWanda Wise, Bill Pullman	United States	Supernatural Thriller	
KMJS Gabi ng Lagim: The Movie	King Mark Baco, Jerrold Tarog, Dodo Dayao	Jillian Ward, Elijah Canlas, Sanya Lopez, Miguel Tanfelix	Philippines	Supernatural Horror Anthology	
Kraken	Nikolai Lebedev	Alexander Petrov, Viktor Dobronravov, Aleksei Guskov, Diana Pozharskaya, Anton Rival, Sergei Garmash	Russia	Monster	
Lilim	Mikhail Red	Heaven Peralejo, Eula Valdez, Ryza Cenon	Philippines	Supernatural Horror	
Lisik: Origin Point	John Renz Cahilig	Nika De Guzman, Grace Rosas Tayo, Jeremiah Allera	Philippines	Independent Apocalyptic Horror Thriller	
Locked	David Yarovesky	Bill Skarsgård, Anthony Hopkins	United States	Thriller	
Lola Barang	Joven Tan	Ronnie Lazaro, Gina Pareño	Philippines	Horror	
Maa	Vishal Furia	Kajol, Ronit Roy, Indraneil Sengupta, Kherin Sharma	India	Mythological Horror	
Mad of Madness	Eden Junjung	Raihaanun, Simhala Avadana, Whani Darmawan	Indonesia	Drama Horror	
Mannequin Wedding	Diep Sela	Chea Sorphea, De Laa Chhin, Kun Kaknika, Sovanlita Ngeth	Cambodia	Mockumentary Supernatural Horror	
Mārama	Taratoa Stappard	Ariāna Osborne, Toby Stephens, Umi Myers	New Zealand	Gothic Horror	
Martinez, Margaritas and Murder!	James Helsing	René Mena, Nicholle Tom, Bonnie Aarons	United States	Dark Comedy Horror	
Match	Danishka Esterhazy	Humberly González, Shaeane Jimenez, Dianne Simpson, Jacques Adriaanse	South Africa	Horror	
M3GAN 2.0	Gerard Johnstone	Allison Williams, Violet McGraw	United States	Sci-fi horror thriller	
Meat Kills	Martijn Smits	Caro Derkx, Sem Ben Yakar, Sweder de Sitter, Emma Josten, Derron Lurvink, Bart Oomen	Netherlands	Horror, Slasher	
Mimics	Kristoffer Polaha	Kristoffer Polaha, Mōriah, Stephen Tobolowsky	United States	Horror Comedy	
Mononoke the Movie: The Ashes of Rage	Kenji Nakamura, Kiyotaka Suzuki	Hiroshi Kamiya, Haruka Tomatsu, Tomoyo Kurosawa, Yoko Hikasa, Yukana, Yuki Kaji, Chō, Kenyu Horiuchi, Ryō Horikawa, Yoshiko Sakakibara, Atsumi Tanezaki	Japan	Animated, Supernatural, Psychological horror	
Mother of Flies	John Adams, Zelda Adams, Toby Poser	John Adams, Zelda Adams, Lulu Adams, Toby Poser	United States	Folk horror	
Mouse of Horrors	Brendan Petrizzo	Lewis Santer, Stephen Staley, Chris Lines, Natasha Tosini, Allie Moreno, Erin Sanderson, Rosie Edwards	United Kingdom	Slasher	
Mouseboat Massacre	Andrea M. Catinella	Kathi DeCouto, Joseph Emms	United Kingdom	Slasher	
Ms. Kanyin	Jerry Ossai	Michelle Dede, Toluwani George, Kanaga Eme Jnr, Natse Jemide, Aduke Shittabey, Temi Otedola	Nigeria	Supernatural Horror	
My Daughter Is a Zombie	Pil Gam-sung	Jo Jung-suk, Lee Jung-eun, Cho Yeo-jeong, Yoon Kyung-ho, Choi Yoo-ri	South Korea	Horror Comedy	
Near Death	Richard V. Somes	Charlie Dizon, Xyriel Manabat	Philippines	Horror	
Night of the Reaper	Brandon Christensen	Jessica Clement, Ryan Robbins, Summer H. Howell, Keegan Connor Tracy	Canada	Horror	
Night Patrol	Ryan Prows	Jermaine Fowler, Justin Long, Freddie Gibbs, RJ Cyler, YG, Nicki Micheaux, Flying Lotus, Phil Brooks, Dermot Mulroney	United States	Horror Thriller	
No Tears in Hell	Michael Caissie	Luke Baines, Gwen Van Dam, Tatjana Marjanovic	United States	Crime Horror	
Noise	Kim Soo-jin	Lee Sun-bin, Kim Min-seok, Han Su-a, Ryu Kyung-soo, Jeon Ik-ryung, Baek Joo-hee	South Korea	Horror Thriller	
Opus	Mark Anthony Green	Ayo Edebiri, John Malkovich, Juliette Lewis, Murray Bartlett, Amber Midthunder, Stephanie Suganami, Young Mazino, Tatanka Means	United States	Psychological thriller	
P77	Derick Cabrido	Barbie Forteza, Euwenn Mikaell, JC Alcantara, Rosanna Roces	Philippines	Psychological Horror Thriller	
Peter Pan's Neverland Nightmare	Scott Jeffrey	Martin Portlock, Megan Placito, Kit Green, Peter DeSouza-Feighoney, Charity Kase	United Kingdom	Slasher	
Penny Lane Is Dead	Mia'kate Russell	Alexandra Jensen, Steve Le Marquand, Ben O'Toole, Fletcher Humphrys, Bailey Spalding, Sophia Wright-Mendelsohn, Tahlee Fereday	Australia	Dark comedy thriller	
Pig Hill	Kevin Lewis	Kirby Griffin, Shane West, Rainey Qualley	United States	Horror	
Play Dead	Carlos Goitia	Paula Brasca, Damian Castillo, Catalina Motto	Argentina, New Zealand	Survival, Thriller	
Popeye the Slayer Man	Robert Michael Ryan	Jason Robert Stephens, Sarah Nicklin, Angela Relucio, Scott Swope, Mabel Thomas	United States	B-Horror Slasher	
Popeye's Revenge	William Stead	Emily Mogilner, Connor Powles, Danielle Ronald, Bruno Cryan, Steven Murphy	United Kingdom	Horror Slasher	
Posthouse	Nikolas Red	Sid Lucero, Bea Binene	Philippines	Psychological horror	
Predator: Killer of Killers	Dan Trachtenberg	Lindsay LaVanchy, Louis Ozawa Changchien, Rick Gonzalez, Michael Biehn	United States	Adult Animated Science Fiction Action	
Primate	Johannes Roberts	Johnny Sequoyah, Troy Kotsur, Jessica Alexander, Victoria Wyant, Kevin McNally, Kae Alexander, Gia Hunter	United States	Horror	
Primitive War	Luke Sparke	Ryan Kwanten, Tricia Helfer, Nick Wechsler, Jeremy Piven, Anthony Ingruber, Aaron Glenane	Australia	Science fiction	
Project MKHEXE	Gerald Robert Waddell	Ignacyo Matynia, Jordan Knapp, Will Jandro, Jennifer Lynn O'Hara, Dwayne Tarver	United States	Found footage	
Punku	J. D. Fernández Molero	Marcelo Quino, Maritza Kategari, Ricardo Delgado, Hugo Sueldo	Peru, Spain	Supernatural Mystery Drama	
Pursued	Jeffrey Obrow	Molly Ringwald, Sam Trammell, Joel Courtney, Angus Macfadyen, Paul Sorvino	United States	Crime Horror	
Qodrat 2	Charles Gozali, Imron Ayikayu	Vino G. Bastian, Acha Septriasa, Della Dartyan, Donny Alamsyah, Hana Saraswati	Indonesia	Religious horror Action	
Queens of the Dead	Tina Romero	Jaquel Spivey, Katy O'Brian, Margaret Cho, Jack Haven, Cheyenne Jackson	United States	Horror Comedy	
R.L. Stine's Pumpkinhead	Jem Garrard	Bean Reid, Adeline Lo, Kevin McNulty, Bob Frazer, Matty Finochio, Seth Isaac Johnson, Troy James	Canada	Monster, Teen, Horror	
Rabbit Trap	Bryn Chainey	Dev Patel, Jade Croot, Rosy McEwen	United Kingdom	Psychological Horror	
Redux Redux	Kevin McManus, Matthew McManus	Stella Marcus, Michaela McManus, Jeremy Holm, Jim Cummings, Grace Van Dien, Dendrie Taylor, Taylor Misiak	United States	Science Fiction Crime Thriller	
Revelations	Yeon Sang-ho	Ryu Jun-yeol, Shin Hyun-been	South Korea	Mystery Thriller	
Rob1n	Lawrence Fowler	Leona Clarke, Michaela McCormick, Victor Mellors	United Kingdom	Horror	
Rosario	Felipe Vargas	Emeraude Toubia, David Dastmalchian, José Zúñiga, Diana Lein, Paul Ben-Victor, Guillermo García, Isabella Hoyos	United States	Horror	
Round the Decay	Adam Newman	Victoria Mirrer, Damian Maffei, Sienna Hubert-Ross, Cary Hite, Alexis Safoyan, Rachel Pizzolato, Phil Duran	United States	Monster	
Sardaar Ji 3	Amar Hundal	Diljit Dosanjh, Neeru Bajwa, Hania Aamir, Jasmin Bajwa, Gulshan Grover, Manav Vij	India	Horror Comedy	
Savage Hunt	Roel Reiné	James Oliver Wheatley, Colin Mace, Anthony Barclay	United States	Thriller, Action	
Screamboat	Steven LaMorte	David Howard Thornton, Allison Pittel, Amy Schumacher, Jesse Posey, Jesse Kove, Rumi C Jean-Louis, Jarlath Conroy, Charles Edwin Powell	United States	Slasher	
Shadow of God	Michael Peterson	Mark O'Brien, Jacqueline Byers, Shaun Johnston	Canada	Supernatural Horror	
Shake, Rattle & Roll: Evil Origins	Shugo Praico, Joey de Guzman, Ian Loreños	Richard Gutierrez, Ivana Alawi, Carla Abellana, Janice de Belen, Manilyn Reynes, Loisa Andalio, Francine Diaz, Seth Fedelin, Fyang Smith, JM Ibarra, Dustin Yu, Ysabel Ortega, Ashley Ortega	Philippines	Horror Anthology	
Shelby Oaks	Chris Stuckmann	Camille Sullivan, Brendan Sexton III, Michael Beach, Sarah Durn, Robin Bartlett, Keith David	United States	Supernatural Horror Mystery	
Shiver Me Timbers	Paul Stephen Mann	Murdo Adams, Stephen Corrall, Tony Greer, Yu Heng Li, Amy Mackie	United Kingdom	Splatter Comedy Horror	
Silent Night, Deadly Night	Mike P. Nelson	Rohan Campbell, Ruby Modine, Mark Acheson, David Lawrence Brown, David Tomlinson	United States	Horror	
Silent Zone	Peter Deak	Matt Devere, Luca Papp, Nikolett Barabas, Declan Hannigan, Alexis Latham	Hungary	Survival Apocalyptic Horror	
Singsot	Wahyu Agung Prasetyo	Ardhana Jovin Aska Haryanto, Landung Simatupang, Jamaluddin Latif	Indonesia	Folk Horror	
Sinners	Ryan Coogler	Michael B. Jordan, Hailee Steinfeld, Jack O'Connell, Wunmi Mosaku, Jayme Lawson, Omar Benson Miller, Delroy Lindo	United States	Horror	
Site	Jason Eric Perlman	Jake McLaughlin, Theo Rossi, Arielle Kebbel, Miki Ishikawa, Yoson An, Danni Wang	United States	Science Fiction, Horror, Thriller	
Skillhouse	Josh Stolberg	50 Cent, Neal McDonough, Leah Pipes, Caitlin Carmichael, Hannah Stocking, Bryce Hall	United States	Horror	
Skyline: Warpath	Liam O'Donnell	Iko Uwais, Scott Adkins, Louis Mandylor, Randall Bacon, Yayan Ruhian	United States	Science fiction Action Horror	
Slanted	Amy Wang	Shirley Chen, Mckenna Grace, Vivian Wu, Fang Du, Maitreyi Ramakrishnan, Amelie Zilber	United States	Body horror	
Sleep No More	Edwin	Rachel Amanda, Lutesha, Iqbaal Ramadhan	Indonesia	Fantasy Horror	
Stay	Jas Summers	Megalyn Echikunwoke, Mo McRae, Dominic Stephens	United States	Horror	
Stigmatized Properties: Possession	Hideo Nakata	Shota Watanabe, Miku Hatta, Kōtarō Yoshida	Japan	Horror Thriller	
Sugar Mill	Awi Suryadi	Arbani Yasiz, Ersya Aurelia, Erika Carlina	Indonesia	Folk Horror	
Teaching Practice: Idiot Girls and School Ghost 2	Kim Min-ha	Han Sun-hwa, Yoo Seon-ho, Hong Ye-ji, Lee Yeo-reum	South Korea	Comedy Horror	
The Astronaut	Jess Varley	Kate Mara, Laurence Fishburne, Gabriel Luna, Ivana Miličević	United States	Science fiction Horror	
The Baby in the Basket	Andy Crane, Nathan Shepka	Amber Doig-Thorne, Michaela Longden, Elle O'Hara, Paul Barber, Lisa Reisner, Nathan Shepka, Maryam d'Abo	United Kingdom	Gothic War Horror	
The Bhootnii	Sidhaant Sachdev	Sanjay Dutt, Sunny Singh, Mouni Roy, Palak Tiwari	India	Horror Comedy	
The Black-Eyed Children	József Gallai	Kata Kuna, Bill Oberst Jr., Simon Bamford	United States, Hungary	Found footage Horror	
The Book Of Sijjin And Illiyyin	Hadrah Daeng Ratu	Yunita Siregar, Dinda Kanyadewi, Tarra Budiman, Djenar Maesa Ayu	Indonesia	Horror Thriller	
The Caretaker	Luke Tedder	Ben Probert, Mackenzie Larsen, Scott Hume, P G Pearson, Lauren Shotton, Chris McQuire, Livvy Dawson	United Kingdom	Independent Horror Thriller	
The Caretakers	Shugo Praico	Iza Calzado, Dimples Romana	Philippines	Horror	
The Carpenter's Son	Lotfy Nathan	Nicolas Cage, Noah Jupe, Souheila Yacoub, Isla Johnston, FKA Twigs	United States, France	Horror	
The Conjuring: Last Rites	Michael Chaves	Vera Farmiga, Patrick Wilson, Ben Hardy, Mia Tomlinson	United States	Supernatural horror	
The Cursed	Hong Won-ki	Yoo Jae-myung, Moon Chae-won, Seo Young-hee, Won Hyun-joon, Solar, Cha Sun-woo, Bae Su-min, Seo Ji-soo, Son Juyeon, Ngoe Xoan, Emma Le	South Korea	Supernatural Horror	
The Cursed of Satan Temptation	Fahmy J. Saad	Donny Alamsyah, Poppy Sovia, Azela Putri	Indonesia	Horror	
The Death of Snow White	Jason Brooks	Sanae Loutsis, Chelsea Edmundson	United States	Dark fantasy Horror	
The Decedent	Andrew Bowser	Zoe Graham, Andrew Bowser, Paul Schwartz	United States	Found Footage Horror	
The Demon's Bride	Azhar Kinoi Lubis	Taskya Namya, Wafda Saifan, Arla Ailani	Indonesia	Horror Thriller	
The Drowned	Samuel Clemens	Corrinne Wicks, Lara Lemon, Michelangelo Fortuzzi	United Kingdom	Horror	
The Elixir	Kimo Stamboel	Mikha Tambayong, Eva Celia, Donny Damara	Indonesia	Survival Horror Zombie	
The Fetus	Joe Lam	Bill Moseley, Lauren LaVera, Julian Curtis	United States	Horror Comedy	
The Ghost Game	Son Dong-wan	Yeri, Lee Chan-hyeong, Seo Dong-hyun, Kim Eun-Bi, Park Seo-yeon	South Korea	Horror Myster Thriller	
The Gorge	Scott Derrickson	Miles Teller, Anya Taylor-Joy, Sigourney Weaver, William Houston	United States	Survival Action	
The Grieving	Stefano Mandalà, Alessandro Antonaci, Daniel Lascar, T3	David Ajayi, Donatella Bartoli, Andrea Caldi, Matteo Pasquini	Italy	Horror	
The Grove	Acoryé White, Patrycja Kepa	Acoryé White, Carl Anthony Payne II, Psalms, Haley Sims, Jolena Wu	United States	Horror, Mystery, Thriller	
The Hand That Rocks the Cradle	Michelle Garza Cervera	Mary Elizabeth Winstead, Maika Monroe, Raúl Castillo, Martin Starr	United States	Horror	
The Healing	Denis Kryuchkov	Wolfgang Cerny, Alena Mitroshina, Vyacheslav Chepurchenko	Slovenia, Russia	Horror Thriller	
The Hem	Tyler Russell	Rani Alowairdi, Terri Merritt Bennett, Ryan Bijan	United States	Supernatural Found Footage Horror	
The Home	James DeMonaco	Pete Davidson, John Glover, Bruce Altman	United States	Psychological horror Thriller	
The Home	Mattias Johansson Skoglund	Malin Levanon, Lily Wahlsteen	Sweden	Supernatural horror	
The House Was Not Hungry Then	Harry Aspinwall	Bobby Rainsbury, Clive Russell, Bill Paterson	United Kingdom	Horror	
The Housemaid	Paul Feig	Sydney Sweeney, Amanda Seyfried, Brandon Sklenar, Michele Morrone, Elizabeth Perkins	United States	Psychological thriller	
The Last 7 Days	Awi Suryadi	Agla Artalidia, Anantya Kirana, Sultan Hamonangan	Indonesia	Horror	
The Last Cabin	Brendan Rudnicki	Tatum Bates, Isabella Bobadilla, Kyree Cook	United States	Found footage Horror	
The Long Walk	Francis Lawrence	Cooper Hoffman, David Jonsson, Garrett Wareing, Joshua Odjick, Tut Nyuot, Charlie Plummer, Ben Wang, Roman Griffin Davis, Jordan Gonzalez, Josh Hamilton, Judy Greer, Mark Hamill	United States	Dystopian Horror	
The Man in My Basement	Nadia Latif	Corey Hawkins, Willem Dafoe, Anna Diop, Tamara Lawrance	United States	Horror Thriller	
The Marianas Web	Marco Calvise	Sahara Bernales, Alexa Ocampo, Ruben Maria Soriquez	Philippines, Italy	Science Fiction Horror	
The Monkey	Osgood Perkins	Theo James, Tatiana Maslany, Elijah Wood, Christian Convery, Colin O'Brien, Rohan Campbell, Sarah Levy	United States	Black Comedy Supernatural horror	
The Oval Portrait	Adrian Langley	Louisa Capulet, Colby Frost, Simon Phillips	Canada	Thriller	
The Parenting	Craig Johnson	Nik Dodani, Brandon Flynn, Parker Posey, Vivian Bang, Lisa Kudrow, Dean Norris, Brian Cox, Edie Falco	United States	Comedy horror	
The Red Mask	Ritesh Gupta	Helena Howard, Inanna Sarkis, Jake Abel	United States	Horror, Slasher	
The Return of the Great God Pan	Brett Stillo	Richard Nichols, Sarah Leight, Jeffry Teraud	United States	Horror, Religious Horror	
The Ritual	David Midell	Al Pacino, Dan Stevens, Ashley Greene, Abigail Cowen, Patricia Heaton	United States	Horror	
The Shallows	Banchang Xia	Xiaoyun Chen, Sinan Li, Wang Sen	China	Adventure Horror Thriller	
The Sticks	Peter Kominek	Shelby Cox-Dersch, Jody Cox, Gin Fedotov	Canada	Horror	
The Strangers – Chapter 2	Renny Harlin	Madelaine Petsch	United States	Horror	
The Surrender	Julia Max	Colby Minifie, Kate Burton	Canada, United States	Supernatural Horror	
Undertone	Ian Tuason	Nina Kiri, Kris Holden-Ried	Canada	Horror	
The Ugly Stepsister	Emilie Blichfeldt	Lea Myren, Thea Sofie Loch Næss, Ane Dahl Tor	Norway	Body horror	
The Virgin of the Quarry Lake	Laura Casabé	Dolores Oliverio, Luisa Merelas, Fernanda Echevarría, Dady Brieva	Argentina, Mexico, Spain	Coming-of-age horror	
The Woman in the Yard	Jaume Collet-Serra	Danielle Deadwyler, Okwui Okpokwasili, Russell Hornsby, Peyton Jackson, Estella Kahiha	United States	Horror thriller	
This Is Not a Test	Adam MacDonald	Olivia Holt, Froy Gutierrez, Carson MacCormac, Luke MacFarlane	Canada, United States	Apocalyptic Horror	
Together	Michael Shanks	Dave Franco, Alison Brie, Damon Herriman, Mia Morrissey, Karl Richmond, Jack Kenny	Australia, United States	Supernatural body horror	
Touch Me	Addison Heimann	Olivia Taylor Dudley, Jordan Gavaris, Lou Taylor Pucci, Marlene Forte, Paget Brewster	United States	Psychosexual comedy horror	
Treasures of Terror: Vol 3	Erik Lundmark	Kateryna Kyseleva, Amy-Helene Carlson, Will Toussant	United States	Horror Drama	
Treasures of Terror: Vol 4	Erik Lundmark	Vera VanGuard, Ianua Coeli Linhart, Bert Dobbelaere	United States	Horror	
Treasures of Terror: Vol 5	Erik Lundmark	Vera VanGuard, Sian Altman, Cecile Sinclair	United States	Horror	
Trick and Treats	Eric Hector	Oliver Adamson, Sarah Allison, Briar Barnes	United States	Horror	
Troll 2	Roar Uthaug	Ine Marie Wilmann, Kim S. Falck-Jørgensen, Mads Sjøgård Pettersen	Norway	Monster	
Until Dawn	David F. Sandberg	Ella Rubin, Michael Cimino, Ji-young Yoo, Odessa A'zion, Maia Mitchell, Belmont Cameli, Peter Stormare	United States	Horror	
Uncontained	Morley Nelson	Morley Nelson, Hayley LeBlanc, Peter O'Meara	United States	Zombie Horror	
Untold	Derick Cabrido	Jodi Sta. Maria, Juan Karlos Labajo, Kaori Oinuma, Mylene Dizon, Joem Bascon, Lianne Valentin, Sarah Edwards, Gloria Diaz	Philippines	psychological horror	
V/H/S/Halloween	Bryan M. Ferguson; Casper Kelly; Micheline Pitt-Norman & R.H. Norman; Alex Ross Perry; Paco Plaza; Anna Zlokovic	TBA	United States	Horror	
Vash Level 2	Krishnadev Yagnik	Janki Bodiwala, Hitu Kanodia, Hiten Kumar, Monal Gajjar	India	Suspense Thriller	
Vicious	Bryan Bertino	Dakota Fanning, Kathryn Hunter, Mary McCormack, Rachel Blanchard, Devyn Nekoda	United States	Horror	
War of the Worlds	Rich Lee	Ice Cube, Eva Longoria, Clark Gregg, Iman Benson, Henry Hunter Hall, Devon Bostick, Michael O'Neill, Andrea Savage	United States	Screenlife Sci-Fi Thriller	
We Bury the Dead	Zak Hilditch	Daisy Ridley, Mark Coles Smith, Brenton Thwaites, Matt Whelan	Australia, United States	Survival Horror thriller	
Weapons	Zach Cregger	Josh Brolin, Julia Garner, Alden Ehrenreich, Benedict Wong, Austin Abrams, Amy Madigan, June Diane Raphael	United States	Horror	
Welcome Home Baby	Andreas Prochaska	Julia Franz Richter, Reinout Scholten van Aschat, Gerti Drassl, Maria Hofstätter, Gerhard Liebmann	Austria, Germany	Horror	
Werewolf Game	Jackie Payne; Cara Brennan	Tony Todd, Lydia Hearst, Bai Ling, Robert Picardo	United States	Horror	
Whistle	Corin Hardy	Dafne Keen, Sophie Nélisse, Nick Frost, Sky Yang, Percy Hynes White	Canada, United States, Ireland	Teen horror	
Wolf Man	Leigh Whannell	Christopher Abbott, Julia Garner	United States	Monster	
Womb	Bridget Smith	Myles Clohessy, Taylor Hanks, Ellen Adair, Abbey Hafer, Corrie Graham, Brian Anthony Wilson, Elizabeth Yu	United States	Horror	
World Breaker	Brad Anderson	Luke Evans, Milla Jovovich, Billie Boullet	United States, United Kingdom	Science Fiction Action Horror	
Your Host	DW Medoff	Jackie Earle Haley, Ella-Rae Smith, Jamie Flatters	United States	Horror	
Ziam	Kulp Kaljareuk	Johnny Anfone, Nuttanicha Dungwattanawanich, Mark Prin Suparat	Thailand	Zombie Horror Action	
