= List of Netflix original films (2025) =

Netflix is an American global on-demand Internet streaming media provider, that has distributed a number of original programs, including original series, specials, miniseries, documentaries and films. Netflix's original films also include content that was first screened on cinematic release in other countries or given exclusive broadcast in other territories, and is then described as Netflix original content.

== Feature films ==
Title	Release date	Genre	Runtime	Language
The Love Scam	January 1, 2025	Romantic comedy	1 h 41 min	Italian
Umjolo: My Beginning, My End!	January 3, 2025	Romantic comedy	1 h 13 min	Zulu
Wallace & Gromit: Vengeance Most Fowl	January 3, 2025	Stop-motion comedy	1 h 22 min	English
Ad Vitam	January 10, 2025	Action thriller	1 h 38 min	French
Back in Action	January 17, 2025	Action comedy	1 h 54 min	English
The Sand Castle	January 24, 2025	Drama	1 h 37 min	Arabic
Lucca's World	January 31, 2025	Drama	1 h 36 min	Spanish
Kinda Pregnant	February 5, 2025	Comedy	1 h 40 min	English
The Witcher: Sirens of the Deep	February 11, 2025	Animation	1 h 31 min	English
Death Before the Wedding	February 12, 2025	Comedy	1 h 46 min	Polish
Honeymoon Crasher	February 12, 2025	Comedy	1 h 35 min	French
La Dolce Villa	February 13, 2025	Romantic comedy	1 h 39 min	English
Dhoom Dhaam	February 14, 2025	Romantic comedy	1 h 48 min	Hindi
Love Forever	February 14, 2025	Romantic comedy	1 h 36 min	Swedish
The Most Beautiful Girl in the World	February 14, 2025	Romantic comedy	2 h 2 min	Indonesian
Umjolo: There Is No Cure	February 14, 2025	Romantic comedy	1 h 18 min	Zulu
A Copenhagen Love Story	February 26, 2025	Romance	1 h 45 min	Danish
Demon City	February 27, 2025	Revenge thriller	1 h 47 min	Japanese
The Wrong Track	February 27, 2025	Drama	1 h 34 min	Norwegian
Sosyal Climbers	February 27, 2025	Romantic comedy	1 h 43 min	Filipino
Counterattack	February 28, 2025	Crime drama	1 h 25 min	Spanish
Squad 36	February 28, 2025	Crime thriller	2 h 4 min	French
Delicious	March 7, 2025	Drama	1 h 42 min	German
Nadaaniyan	March 7, 2025	Romantic comedy	1 h 59 min	Hindi
Plankton: The Movie	March 7, 2025	CGI animation musical comedy	1 h 27 min	English
The Electric State	March 14, 2025	Science fiction adventure	2 h 8 min	English
Little Siberia	March 21, 2025	Comedy drama	1 h 46 min	Finnish
Revelations	March 21, 2025	Thriller	2 h 2 min	Korean
The Life List	March 28, 2025	Romantic comedy	2 h 5 min	English
Promised Hearts	March 31, 2025	Religious romantic drama	1 h 49 min	Indonesian
Banger	April 2, 2025	Comedy thriller	1 h 31 min	French
Test	April 4, 2025	Sports drama	2 h 25 min	Tamil
The Dad Quest	April 9, 2025	Drama	1 h 24 min	Spanish
Frozen Hot Boys	April 10, 2025	Drama	1 h 58 min	Thai
Meet the Khumalos	April 11, 2025	Comedy	1 h 33 min	English
iHostage	April 18, 2025	Crime thriller	1 h 42 min	Dutch
Bullet Train Explosion	April 23, 2025	Action thriller	2 h 17 min	Japanese
Havoc	April 25, 2025	Action thriller	1 h 47 min	English
Jewel Thief – The Heist Begins	April 25, 2025	Heist action thriller	1 h 57 min	Hindi
Exterritorial	April 30, 2025	Action thriller	1 h 49 min	German
The Biggest Fan	May 1, 2025	Comedy	1 h 32 min	Spanish
Last Bullet	May 7, 2025	Action-adventure	1 h 52 min	French
Nonnas	May 9, 2025	Comedy	1 h 54 min	English
Fear Street: Prom Queen	May 23, 2025	Slasher	1 h 30 min	English
Off Track 2	May 23, 2025	Sports comedy drama	1 h 37 min	Swedish
A Widow's Game	May 30, 2025	Crime thriller	2 h 2 min	Spanish
Lost in Starlight	May 30, 2025	Animated romantic drama	1 h 38 min	Korean
The Heart Knows	May 30, 2025	Drama	1 h 29 min	Spanish
K.O.	June 6, 2025	Action	1 h 26 min	French
Straw	June 6, 2025	Drama	1 h 47 min	English
Our Times	June 11, 2025	Comedy	1 h 30 min	Spanish
KPop Demon Hunters	June 20, 2025	CGI animation musical fantasy	1 h 39 min	English
Semi-Soeter	June 20, 2025	Comedy	1 h 32 min	Afrikaans
The Old Guard 2	July 2, 2025	Superhero	1 h 46 min	English
Ziam	July 9, 2025	Horror	1 h 36 min	Thai
Brick	July 10, 2025	Thriller	1 h 40 min	German
Aap Jaisa Koi	July 11, 2025	Romantic comedy	1 h 55 min	Hindi
Almost Cops	July 11, 2025	Comedy	1 h 37 min	Dutch
Madea's Destination Wedding	July 11, 2025	Comedy	1 h 44 min	English
Almost Family	July 18, 2025	Comedy	1 h 21 min	Portuguese
Wall to Wall	July 18, 2025	Suspense thriller	1 h 58 min	Korean
A Normal Woman	July 24, 2025	Psychological thriller	1 h 50 min	Indonesian
Happy Gilmore 2	July 25, 2025	Sports comedy	1 h 57 min	English
An Honest Life	July 31, 2025	Thriller	2 h 2 min	Swedish
My Oxford Year	August 1, 2025	Coming-of-age romantic comedy	1 h 52 min	English
Fixed	August 13, 2025	Adult animated romantic comedy	1 h 26 min	English
Night Always Comes	August 15, 2025	Crime drama	1 h 50 min	English
Fall for Me	August 21, 2025	Erotic thriller	1 h 45 min	German
Gold Rush Gang	August 21, 2025	Historical drama	2 h	Thai
One Hit Wonder	August 21, 2025	Romantic comedy	1 h 52 min	Filipino
Abandoned Man	August 22, 2025	Drama	1 h 31 min	Turkish
Fantasy Football Ruined Our Lives	August 27, 2025	Comedy	1 h 38 min	Italian
Planet Single: Greek Adventure	August 27, 2025	Comedy	1 h 40 min	Polish
The Thursday Murder Club	August 28, 2025	Mystery	2 h	English
Love Untangled	August 29, 2025	Coming-of-age romance	2 h 1 min	Korean
Inspector Zende	September 5, 2025	Comedy	1 h 52 min	Hindi
Kontrabida Academy	September 11, 2025	Comedy	1 h 48 min	Filipino
The Wrong Paris	September 12, 2025	Romantic comedy	1 h 47 min	English
Same Day with Someone	September 18, 2025	Romantic comedy	1 h 59 min	Thai
She Said Maybe	September 19, 2025	Romantic comedy	1 h 47 min	German
French Lover	September 26, 2025	Romantic comedy	2 h 2 min	French
Mantis	September 26, 2025	Action	1 h 53 min	Korean
Ruth & Boaz	September 26, 2025	Romance	1 h 33 min	English
Steve	October 3, 2025	Drama	1 h 33 min	English
Caramelo	October 8, 2025	Comedy	1 h 41 min	Portuguese
Swim to Me	October 10, 2025	Drama	1 h 43 min	Spanish
The Woman in Cabin 10	October 10, 2025	Psychological thriller	1 h 35 min	English
Everybody Loves Me When I'm Dead	October 14, 2025	Crime drama	2 h 8 min	Thai
Inside Furioza	October 15, 2025	Action	2 h 47 min	Polish
The Time That Remains	October 16, 2025	Romantic drama	1 h 57 min	Filipino
27 Nights	October 17, 2025	Drama	1 h 48 min	Spanish
Good News	October 17, 2025	Action thriller	2 h 18 min	Korean
She Walks in Darkness	October 17, 2025	Political thriller	1 h 48 min	Spanish
The Twits	October 17, 2025	CGI animation comedy	1 h 42 min	English
The Elixir	October 23, 2025	Zombie thriller	1 h 57 min	Indonesian
A House of Dynamite	October 24, 2025	Political thriller	1 h 55 min	English
Ballad of a Small Player	October 29, 2025	Psychological thriller	1 h 42 min	English
Baramulla	November 7, 2025	Horror	1 h 52 min	Hindi
Frankenstein	November 7, 2025	Gothic science fiction	2 h 32 min	English
Groom & Two Brides	November 7, 2025	Comedy	1 h 37 min	Arabic
Mango	November 7, 2025	Romance	1 h 36 min	Danish
A Merry Little Ex-Mas	November 12, 2025	Christmas romantic comedy	1 h 31 min	English
Tee Yai: Born to Be Bad	November 13, 2025	Crime drama	1 h 57 min	Thai
In Your Dreams	November 14, 2025	CGI animation fantasy	1 h 31 min	English
Lefter: The Story of the Ordinarius	November 14, 2025	Drama	2 h 6 min	Turkish
Champagne Problems	November 19, 2025	Christmas romantic comedy	1 h 39 min	English
The Son of a Thousand Men	November 19, 2025	Drama	2 h 7 min	Portuguese
The Follies	November 20, 2025	Anthology drama	2 h 1 min	Spanish
Train Dreams	November 21, 2025	Drama	1 h 43 min	English
Jingle Bell Heist	November 26, 2025	Christmas romantic comedy	1 h 36 min	English
Troll 2	December 1, 2025	Monster	1 h 44 min	Norwegian
My Secret Santa	December 3, 2025	Christmas romantic comedy	1 h 32 min	English
I Wish You Had Told Me	December 4, 2025	Drama	1 h 43 min	Filipino
Jay Kelly	December 5, 2025	Comedy drama	2 h 13 min	English
Love and Wine	December 5, 2025	Romantic comedy	1 h 49 min	English
Stephen	December 5, 2025	Crime drama	2 h 3 min	Tamil
The Night My Dad Saved Christmas 2	December 5, 2025	Comedy	1 h 34 min	Spanish
Lost in the Spotlight	December 11, 2025	Comedy drama	1 h 55 min	Indonesian
The Fakenapping	December 11, 2025	Comedy	1 h 26 min	Arabic
Wake Up Dead Man: A Knives Out Mystery	December 12, 2025	Murder mystery	2 h 26 min	English
10Dance	December 18, 2025	Romance	2 h 8 min	Japanese
A Time for Bravery	December 19, 2025	Comedy	1 h 47 min	Spanish
Raat Akeli Hai − The Bansal Murders	December 19, 2025	Crime drama	2 h 16 min	Hindi
The Great Flood	December 19, 2025	Dystopian action	1 h 48 min	Korean
Goodbye June	December 24, 2025	Drama	1 h 56 min	English

== Documentaries ==
Title	Release date	Runtime	Language
Don't Die: The Man Who Wants to Live Forever	January 1, 2025	1 h 29 min	English
Miss Italia Mustn't Die	February 26, 2025	1 h 38 min	Italian
Larissa: The Other Side of Anitta	March 6, 2025	1 h 40 min	Portuguese
Chaos: The Manson Murders	March 7, 2025	1 h 36 min	English
The Twister: Caught in the Storm	March 19, 2025	1 h 29 min	English
Con Mum	March 25, 2025	1 h 28 min	English
Oklahoma City Bombing: American Terror	April 18, 2025	1 h 24 min	English
Pangolin: Kulu's Journey	April 21, 2025	1 h 30 min	English
Britain and the Blitz	May 5, 2025	1 h 17 min	English
Untold: Shooting Guards	May 6, 2025	1 h 25 min	English
Karol G: Tomorrow Was Beautiful	May 8, 2025	1 h 48 min	Spanish
A Deadly American Marriage	May 9, 2025	1 h 42 min	English
Untold: The Liver King	May 13, 2025	1 h 20 min	English
Vini Jr.	May 15, 2025	1 h 46 min	Portuguese
The Quilters	May 16, 2025	33 min	English
Untold: The Fall of Favre	May 20, 2025	1 h 3 min	English
Air Force Elite: Thunderbirds	May 23, 2025	1 h 31 min	English
Titan: The OceanGate Disaster	June 11, 2025	1 h 51 min	English
Grenfell: Uncovered	June 20, 2025	1 h 41 min	English
Shark Whisperer	June 30, 2025	1 h 30 min	English
Countdown: Taylor vs. Serrano	July 3, 2025	49 min	English
Apocalypse in the Tropics	July 14, 2025	1 h 49 min	Portuguese
I'm Still a Superstar	July 18, 2025	1 h 21 min	Spanish
Stolen: Heist of the Century	August 8, 2025	1 h 35 min	English
Songs From the Hole	August 13, 2025	1 h 37 min	English
The Truth About Jussie Smollett?	August 22, 2025	1 h 26 min	English
Christopher − A Beautiful Real Life	August 27, 2025	1 h 31 min	Danish
Millionaire	August 28, 2025	1 h 42 min	Spanish
Unknown Number: The High School Catfish	August 29, 2025	1 h 34 min	English
Rebel Royals: An Unlikely Love Story	September 16, 2025	1 h 35 min	English
Rockstar: Duki from the End of the World	October 2, 2025	1 h 42 min	Spanish
My Father, the BTK Killer	October 10, 2025	1 h 34 min	English
The Perfect Neighbor	October 17, 2025	1 h 38 min	English
Who Killed the Montreal Expos?	October 21, 2025	1 h 31 min	French
Babo: The Haftbefehl Story	October 28, 2025	1 h 32 min	German
Aileen: Queen of the Serial Killers	October 30, 2025	1 h 43 min	English
Being Eddie	November 12, 2025	1 h 43 min	English
Eloá the Hostage: Live on TV	November 12, 2025	1 h 25 min	Portuguese
Selena y Los Dinos: A Family's Legacy	November 17, 2025	1 h 57 min	English
The Carman Family Deaths	November 19, 2025	1 h 30 min	English
Dining with the Kapoors	November 21, 2025	1 h 1 min	English
The Stringer: The Man Who Took the Photo	November 28, 2025	1 h 30 min	English
All the Empty Rooms	December 1, 2025	35 min	English
Lali: Time to Step Up	December 4, 2025	1 h 14 min	Spanish
The New Yorker at 100	December 5, 2025	1 h 37 min	English
Masaka Kids, A Rhythm Within	December 9, 2025	40 min	English
Murder in Monaco	December 17, 2025	1 h 30 min	English
Breakdown: 1975	December 19, 2025	1 h 30 min	English
Elway	December 22, 2025	1 h 39 min	English
Cover-Up	December 26, 2025	1 h 58 min	English
Evil Influencer: The Jodi Hildebrandt Story	December 30, 2025	1 h 41 min	English

== Specials ==
These programs are one-time original events or supplementary content related to original films.

Title	Release date	Genre	Runtime	Language
Anuja	February 5, 2025	Drama	23 min	Hindi
The 31st Annual Screen Actors Guild Awards	February 23, 2025	Award show	2 h 17 min	English
Welcome, Now Get Lost	May 13, 2025	Comedic variety show	1 h 54 min	Japanese
Netflix Tudum 2025	May 31, 2025	Fan event	1 h 56 min	English
Katie Taylor vs. Amanda Serrano	July 11, 2025	Sports event	4 h 36 min	English
Canelo Álvarez vs. Terence Crawford	September 13, 2025	Sports event	5 h 14 min	English
Dr. Seuss's The Sneetches	November 3, 2025	CGI animation adventure	57 min	English
One Shot with Ed Sheeran	November 21, 2025	Music	1 h 1 min	English
KPop Demon Hunters: Fireplace	December 1, 2025	Yule log	1 h	No dialogue
The Making of Jay Kelly	December 5, 2025	Making-of	50 min	English
Elmo and Mark Rober's Merry Giftmas	December 8, 2025	Educational	35 min	English
Jake Paul vs. Anthony Joshua	December 19, 2025	Sports event	4 h 19 min	English
Christmas Gameday: Cowboys vs. Commanders	December 25, 2025	Sports event	5 h 19 min	English
Christmas Gameday: Lions vs. Vikings	December 25, 2025	Sports event	4 h	English

== Shorts ==
These are programs that have a runtime of less than 20 minutes.

Title	Genre	Release date	Runtime	Language
Snoop's Holiday Halftime Party	Music	December 25, 2025	12 min	English
