= Nang Eye =

2016 Thai television series

- Official drama poster
- Thai: นางอาย
- Genre: Romantic comedy
- Based on: Nang Eye (นางอาย) by Naravadee
- Directed by: Pawanrat Narksuriya
- Starring: Warintorn Panhakarn; Nuttanicha Dungwattanawanich; Kummun Klomkaew; Chanoksuda Raksanaves; Jakarin Puribhat; Carissa Springett; Arisa Homgroon; Apatsarinya Pemberger; Panpaporn Sridurongkatham; Raiwin Ong; Khunnarong Pratesrat; Puwadon Vejvongsatechavat; Natpongpon Suddee; Methus Treerattanawareesin; Jiratpisit Jaravijit; Kananak Naiyanaprasert
- Country of origin: Thailand
- Original language: Thai
- No. of episodes: 15

Production
- Running time: 150 minutes
- Production companies: Channel 3; Maker–Y

Original release
- Network: Channel 3
- Release: 24 September – 4 December 2016

Related
- Nang Eye (film, 1990); Nang Eye (drama, 1995)

Nang Eye (Thai: นางอาย) is a Thai television series directed by Pawanrat Narksuriya (Meow). It stars Warintorn Panhakarn (Great), Nuttanicha Dungwattanawanich (Nychaa), Kummun Klomkaew (Ball), Chanoksuda Raksanaves (Gap), Jakarin Puribhat (Gap), Carissa Springett, Arisa Homgroon (Kwang), Apatsarinya Pemberger, Panpaporn Sridurongkatham (Pan), Raiwin Ong (Amy), Khunnarong Pratesrat (Krating), Puwadon Vejvongsatechavat (James), Natpongpon Suddee (Boss), Methus Treerattanawareesin (Jack), Jiratpisit Jaravijit (Boom), and Kananak Naiyanaprasert (Chopper).

It is adapted from the Thai novel of the same name by Naravadee, which was based on her own life experiences and published in Kullastree magazine in 1969. Produced by Channel 3 together with Maker–Y, it premiered on September 24, 2016, and concluded its run on December 4, 2016.

== Synopsis ==
Nang, a lively and high-spirited 17-year-old girl, is abruptly sent by her parents to a conservative, all-girls convent boarding school in Penang, Malaysia. Her father, a prominent government minister, hopes the strict environment and firm discipline enforced by the nuns will tame her mischievous antics and mold her into a proper lady. Seeing the school as a literal prison, Nang struggles against the harsh rules but soon adapts after finding comfort in a close-knit group of friends, including the quiet, polite student Sineenart. During her time there, Nang also unknowingly uncovers a secret from her family's past: Sister Teresa, the school's only Thai nun, who entered the convent for peace of mind after Nang's father broke her heart and left her years ago.

Nang's school life becomes more complicated when Thanathip, a disciplined 30-year-old Thai Consul, arrives to oversee the Thai students. Thanathip is also the older half-brother of Saisuda, an arrogant student who frequently targets Nang out of bitterness over her own status as an illegitimate child. Although Nang and Thanathip initially clash over his strict authority, her sharp wit and lively personality gradually win him over, making him quietly protective when other young suitors express interest in her. Meanwhile, the situation worsens when Sineenart's mother goes bankrupt. Desperate to help her friend continue her education, Nang secures financial aid from Thanathip, who agrees to secretly sponsor Sineenart's schooling. Unaware of his affection for Nang, a deeply grateful Sineenart develops romantic feelings for him.

Years later, after graduating and returning to Bangkok as adults, the former students find their complicated relationships coming to a head. Thanathip rejects Sineenart by confessing his love for Nang. Devastated by the truth, Sineenart attempts suicide but is saved just in time by Nang, allowing the two friends to eventually reconcile. Meanwhile, her father forces her into a rushed arranged engagement with Tassanai, a young doctor, to honor an old family promise. Determined to secure their future, Thanathip investigates the arrangement and discovers that the doctor is already secretly in love with a clinic nurse. Using this information, he convinces Tassanai to call off the engagement, freeing Nang so they can finally marry.

== Cast and characters ==
=== Main ===
- Warintorn Panhakarn (Great) as Thanathip "Thip"
- Nuttanicha Dungwattanawanich (Nychaa) as Apiradee "Nang"
- Kummun Klomkaew (Ball) as Chaipong
- Chanoksuda Raksanaves (Gap) as Sineenart "Si"
- Jakarin Puribhat (Gap) as Khampol
- Carissa Springett as Saisuda "Sai"
- Arisa Homgroon (Kwang) as Maria
- Apatsarinya Pemberger as Honglan
- Panpaporn Sridurongkatham (Pan) as Joikham
- Raiwin Ong (Amy) as Meena
- Khunnarong Pratesrat (Krating) as Peter
- Puwadon Vejvongsatechavat (James) as David
- Natpongpon Suddee (Boss) as Chris
- Methus Treerattanawareesin (Jack) as Doctor Tassanai
- Jiratpisit Jaravijit (Boom) as Mamu
- Kananak Naiyanaprasert (Chopper) as Montree

=== Supporting ===
- Anchalee Chongkhadikij (Pooh) as Reverend Mother St. Louis
- Chomchai Chatvilai (Add) as Sister St. Audrey
- Penpak Sirikul (Tai) as Sister St. Francis
- Sarocha Watittapan (Tao) as Sister St. Theresa
- Puttachat Pongsuchat (Tui) as Sister St. Pauline
- Nonthiya Jiwbangpa (Jeab) as Sister St. Margarita
- Duanghathai Satdhathip (Lek) as Sister St. Rita
- Boondaree Jitreengam (Bow) as Janya
- Kanyarat Sunthornan (Tip) as Zaria
- Songsit Roongnophakunsri (Kob) as Denchat (Nang's father)
- Kwanruedee Klomklom (Kwan) as Aem-on (Nang's mother)
- Karoonpon Tieansuwan as (Petch) as Phitak
- Ron Banjongsang (Eed) as Akra (Thip's father)
- Wichuda Pindum (Mam) as Nuanyai (Sai's mother)
- Sueangsuda Lawanprasert (Namfon) as Saisanom (Si's mother)
- Parichat Praihirun (Koi) as Tubtim
- Satdha Satdhathip (Rug) as Barry
- Prin Wikran as Wen (Joikham's father)
- Warapun Nguitragool (Jang) as Lee (Joikham's mother)
- Kosawis Piyasakulkaew (Pok) as Paul
- Sarunchana Apisamaimongkol (Aye) as Saya

=== Guest ===
- Pawanrat Narksuriya (Meow) as Dujduean
- Smith Likhitmasakul (Ou) as young Denchat
- Panithi Kruasopon (Pom) as Jet
- Supachai Suwanon (Palm) as young Phitak
- Michelle Behrmann as young Sister St. Theresa
- Pornphatra Thaweephanturat (Mint) as young Sister St. Francis
- Rachawat Klipngern (Mix) as rapist
- Chonthicha Tiengtham (Gigi) as Poopae
- Sirirat Yonyothinkul (Wan) as chairball coach
- Suphatchaya Boonyasukhanon (Bell) as Nalisa
- Naphak Janjitranon (Nutcha) as young Nang
- Emily Jane Jones as young Si
- Surajit Boonyanont (Pom) as Si's father
- Krit Putrangsi as Uncle Dul
- Sahapoom Totruengsap as Chris's father
- Wasan Uttamayothin (Nong) as host
- Chakapan Tanthasuwanna (Kong) as Doctor Nat
- Danai Charuchinta (Kik) as Brownie
