= I Love You Two Thousand =

- Theatrical release poster
- Directed by: Naruebordee Wechakum
- Written by: Naruebordee Wechakum; Pruch Neamsri; Wipada Weanpetch; Romran Jongjarb
- Produced by: Somsak Techaratanaprasert
- Starring: Nuttanicha Dungwattanawanich; Nat Kitcharit; Kirana Pipityakorn; Parita Rirermkul; Inthanon Seangsiripaisarn; Suriyawit Thanomchaisanit; Teerawate Suparwong; Nopparoot Tanthanawikrai
- Cinematography: Peerawat Sangklang
- Edited by: Romran Jongjarb; Anan Thongchuea
- Music by: Banana Sound Studio
- Production company: The Pipal Tree
- Distributed by: Sahamongkol Film International
- Release date: October 12, 2023 (Thailand)
- Running time: 114 minutes
- Country: Thailand
- Language: Thai

I Love You Two Thousand (Thai: 14 อีกครั้ง, RTGS: 14 Ik Khrang; lit. '14 Again') is a 2023 Thai coming-of-age romantic comedy film written and directed by Naruebordee Wechakum. It stars Nuttanicha Dungwattanawanich (Nychaa), Nat Kitcharit, Kirana Pipityakorn (Fairy), Parita Rirermkul (Monet), Inthanon Seangsiripaisarn (Pupa), Suriyawit Thanomchaisanit (Yochi), Teerawate Suparwong (Lek), and Nopparoot Tanthanawikrai (VJ). The film follows a university student and her childhood friend, Gib and Tor, as they revisit their youth while watching over a group of adolescents grappling with love, friendship, and loss.

Produced by The Pipal Tree and distributed by Sahamongkol Film International, it was released on October 12, 2023, in Thai theaters.

== Plot ==
In 2003, Gib (Nuttanicha Dungwattanawanich), a college student bored with her life in Bangkok, returns to her provincial hometown to clear her mind. Her plans are disrupted when she unexpectedly runs into Tor (Nat Kitcharit), her former best friend whom she has been avoiding for years. While Gib struggles with her unresolved past, Tor remains confused about the true nature of their former relationship and the reasons behind her sudden departure.

Meanwhile, Gib's mischievous 14-year-old brother, Gun, faces his own dilemmas after falling for Ping, a new student at his school. Gun seeks dating advice from his friends Mon, Wat, Tai, and Sara, though their chaotic guidance frequently results in disaster. Gun's persistent attempts to win Ping over eventually drag Gib and Tor into the chaos. In the end, the wild antics of the teenage group force Gib and Tor to confront their own adolescent heartbreaks, causing them to reconsider their feelings for each other.

== Cast ==
The actors participating in this film are:

- Nuttanicha Dungwattanawanich (Nychaa) as Gib
- Nat Kitcharit as Tor
- Kirana Pipityakorn (Fairy) as Ping
- Parita Rirermkul (Monet) as Sara
- Inthanon Seangsiripaisarn (Pupa) as Gun
- Suriyawit Thanomchaisanit (Yochi) as Doraemon
- Teerawate Suparwong (Lek) as Tai
- Nopparoot Tanthanawikrai (VJ) as Wat
- Supranee Charoenpol (Kai) as Gib's mother
- Supoj Janjareonborn (Lift) as Gib's father
- Tee Doksadao as Wat's father
- Pimchat Narongbhiromkul (Ploy) as Morakot
- Somyos Matures (EddyHeng) as Uan
- Hayward Prescott (James) as George
- Phadej Onlahung as English teacher
- Isra Wechakum as rickshaw passenger
- Wannarat Rattanadat (Sunny) as rickshaw passenger
- Pruch Neamsri (Thungbeer) as publishing employee

== Soundtracks ==
- "แค่บอกว่ารักเธอ (Just Say "Love")" by Pramote Vilepana
- "ไกลออกไป" by Day Tripper
- "แค่หนึ่งนาที" by D2B
