= My Secret Zone =

2024 Thailand television series

- Nan Fah Chalalai
- Genre: Television drama
- Based on: น่าน ฟ้า ชลาลัย by Sornklin
- Written by: Punpat
- Directed by: Aun Kornpoj Suebchompoo
- Starring: James Ma; Nychaa Dungwattanawanich; Mean Attachitsataporn
- Country of origin: Thailand
- Original language: Thai
- No. of episodes: 13

Production
- Producer: Jett Nattapong Murnprasithivej
- Running time: 69 minutes
- Production companies: BEC World; Maker Group

Original release
- Network: Channel 3
- Release: 25 July – 18 September 2024

My Secret Zone (Thai: น่าน ฟ้า ชลาลัย, Nan Fah Chalalai) is a romantic Thai drama of 2024 starring James Ma, Nuttanicha Dungwattanawanich, Phiravich Attachitsataporn and adapted from the novel with the same title of Sornklin. The series is directed by Aun Kornpoj Suebchompoo that premiered on Channel 3 on 25 July 2024 airing on Wednesdays and Thursdays at 20:00 ICT. The series will conclude on 18 September 2024.

== Cast ==
=== Main role ===
- James Ma (James) as "Nan" Nantawan Nonthakitjonan
- Nychaa Nuttanicha Dungwattanawanich (Nychaa) as "Nam" Chalalai Patthammanan
- Phiravich Attachitsataporn (Mean) as "Fah" Fakhram Thanathip

=== Supporting ===
- Kajbhunditt Jaidee (Junior) as Thanakorn Thiraphaibul / "Korn"
- Chayanit Chayjaroen (Tita) as Kawintra Wiphaphornphan / "Kaem"
- Chattarika Sittiprom (Care) as Kamolchanok / "Ke"
- Sarocha Watittapan (Tao) as Kewalin / "Lin"
- Chatayodom Hiranyatithi (Chai) as Phassaphong Nonthakitjonan / "Phong"
- Kongkapan Sangsuriya (Noom) as Khomchan Rueangphut / "Chan"
- Sarut Vichitrananda (Big) as Adis Thanathip / "Dis"
- Noppachai Muttaweevong (Joker) as Kuea Wiphaphornphan
- Supoj Janjareonborn (Lift) as Adul Thanathip
- Napat Chokejindachai (Toptap) as Khunphol / "Phol"
- Nutpawin Kulkalyadee (Jem) as Nikorm / "Nik"
- Khemarat Soonthornnont (Ong) as Thanawut / "Tiara"
- Nathapatsorn Simasthien (Dao) as Minthita / "Mint"
- Chinnapat Kittichaiwarangkul (Flute) as Burin
- Prathana Suchookorn (Kluai) as Chuen

=== Guest appearances ===
- Sueangsuda Lawanprasert (Namfon) as Nalina Thiraphaibul
- Songsit Rungnopakunsi (Kob) as Thanawat Thiraphaibul
- Krunnapol Teansuwan (Petch) as Thanachot Patthamanan / "Chot"
- Pattamawan Kaomulkadee (Yui) as Jureemas Thanathip
- Sukol Sasijulaka (Jome) as Thirut Patthamanan / "Rut"
- Namnung Suttidachanai (Namnung) as Thanyamon Patthamanan / "Mon"
- Atichanan Seesaywok (Ice) as Priya Patthamanan
- Chakapan Chan-O (Jack) as Chatri
- Lorena Schuett (Lena) as
- Euro Waratthip Kittiphaisan as
- Kosawis Piyasakulkaew as

== Production ==
The series released on July 25, 2024, on Channel 3 every Wednesday and Thursdays.
