= The Rivalry (TV series) =

2022 Thai television series

- Also known as: Game Prattana
- Original title: เกมปรารถนา
- Genre: Drama; Romance
- Based on: Bhalang
- Screenplay by: Pattaranun Israngkoon Na Ayutthaya; Bhulandhanmek; Nutthapol Kadeboonchu
- Directed by: Nunthaporn Kaewamporn
- Creative directors: Bhumin Chitkhamkoon; Akkara Chantra
- Starring: Teeradetch Metawarayut; Nuttanicha Dungwattanawanich
- Opening theme: เป็นหนึ่ง by Chaba Krittima
- Ending theme: คลั่ง by Issara Kitnitchi
- Country of origin: Thailand
- Original language: Thai
- No. of seasons: 1
- No. of episodes: 20

Production
- Executive producer: Palangtham Kromthongsuk
- Editors: ONE EDIT STUDIO; Wanchai Fangklang; Nutthanate Fangklang
- Running time: 127 minutes
- Production companies: Raklakorn Co., Ltd.

Original release
- Network: Channel 3; Viu
- Release: January 26 – March 31, 2022

Related
- Game of Outlaws; Pom Sanaeha

The Rivalry (Thai: เกมปรารถนา) is a Thai television drama starring Teeradetch Metawarayut and Nuttanicha Dungwattanawanich. The drama aired on January 26, 2022, every Wednesday and Thursday at 20:30 (8:30 pm) on Channel 3, until March 31, 2022. The first trailer was released on January 5, 2022, and the second trailer was released on January 18, 2022, by Channel 3.

In addition, The Rivalry is one of several Channel 3 dramas co-released with Viu for international viewers.

== Synopsis ==
Weerayawanich, the owner of Empire Group and Teerakitkarnkul, the owner of T Group, have been the rivals of consumer business for a long time. As a result, the heirs of both families, Milin and Anawin, affecting them being a rival since young. The both have a seesaw battle so far, until the day when they take the responsible of the families' business...the overcoming one another is the thing that they want.

Not just the rivalry of the two families, inside the Weerayawanich though, it always has a competition between them. The chair of CEO of the Empire Group is the thing that Milin aspired although she has to compete with her brother. The things went worse, when Phee, Milin's father, re-married to Wianna and transfer the post of CEO to her. That made Milin so angry and cut off the relationship with Phee. Moreover, the news is not just upset Milin but also shocked Anawin, because Wianna is his ex-girlfriend and she left her one year ago.

When the thing become like this, Milin and Anawin decided to cooperate with each other for establishing new company and do everything to make it big, for revenge Phee. They also announce at Phee's wedding, that they have become a couple. But when the time passed, the pretending to be a couple become real, because Milin has a crush on Anawin since childhood. While, Tewis has a secretly love to Milin and also Lisa, loves Anawin though. In addition, Phakin has concealed something for a lone time, the situation that Milin suspected and Phee seems to know it. How the love life and the resentment of Milin and Anawin would end? When the business rivalry of both families lead everyone to bet with their dignity, the game that have to exchange, choose and spoof for the victory. The game that cause their hearts shaken with the fire of desire.

== Cast and characters ==
=== Main ===
- Teeradetch Metawarayut as Anawin Teerakitkarnkul / Win

The oldest child of Porama. He is warm and honest person. He lost his mother since young which make him become more taciturn. Moreover, he loves drawing and never thought to be the CEO of T Group. He is the ex-boyfriend of Wianna but he got dumped without being told any reason.

- Nuttanicha Dungwattanawanich as Milin Weerayawanich / Lin

The second child, the only daughter of Phee. She is velvet glove, likes to conquer and always thinks that she and Anawin are rivalry. Milin does everything for being CEO of Empire Group, but above all, she wants the acknowledgement from her father. In the past she used to be close with Phakin, but something happened to made everything changed and she also didn't know what is that incident. In addition, she believes that Wianna will come in to her family for scamming her father, so she would like to get rid of her.

- Yuranunt Pamornmontri as Phee Weerayawanich

the father of Phakin, Milin and Pete and Empire Group's president. He is foxy and good at planning. Actually, he loves his family and his child but he expresses in the wrong way, so that make Milin lack of warmth from him.

- Manatsanun Phanlerdwongsakul as Wianna Methamas (Read: Wi-an-na) / Anna

The woman who married to Phee with the mysterious reason. She is clever, quick-witted and knows when to beat and when to step back. She used to dump Anamin for some reason and that was related to the marriage with Phee.

- Thakoon Karnthip as Tewis Tiwawong / Peong

The former emplyee of T Group, but later changed the side to Empire Group. Actually, he works for Phee with undisclosed reason, also he is quick-witted and crafty. He has a secret crush on Milin, so he does everything to separate Milin and Anawin.

- Prima Bhuncharoen as Lisa Setsiri

Anawin's deft and excellent secretary. She is secretly loves Anawin so far, when Milin is back to Anawin's life, she try to separate them but it does not even work.

=== Supporting ===
- Kanin Stanley as Phakin Weerayawanich

Milin's older brother. He seems to more pliable than Milin and doesn't want the chair of CEO that much. In the past, it had some incident happened which made him and Milin didn't close to each other as before.

- Lita Kaliya Niehus as Jennis

The wife of Phakin who honestly loves him but her appearance seems unfriendly.

- Phatrakorn Boosarakumwadi as Naorn Teerakitkarnkul (Read: Na-orn) / Orn

The wounger sister of Anawin and the youngest child of Porama. She is optimistic and kind hearted.

- Nakhun Rojanai as Pete Weerayawanich

The youngest in Weerayawanich family. He is kind and soft person, and being the only one who doesn't has any resentment between the two families' businesses. But he is also affected from the parenting of Phee.

- Rapheephong Thapsuwan as Sean
- Chartayodom Hiranyasthiti as Porama Teerakitkarnkul

The father of Anawin and Naorn. He looks kind outside but crafty, quick-witted and clever inside.

- Duangta Tungkamani as Amata

She is Phee's mother. She is family woman, decisive and does everything for the peace of her family.

- Baromvudh Hiranyasthiti as Toto
- Phantila Fooklin as Unging (Read: Ung-ing)
- Sukhapat Lohwacharin as Captain
- Phenphet Phenkul as Wasuthorn

=== Cameo ===
- Wayne Falconer as Chart
- Joy Chuancheun as Kaew
- Yong Chernyim as Boonliang
- Jennifer Kim as Madam Lee
- Thanongsak Suphakan as Mister Lee
- Surasak Chaiaat as Jetsada
- Orasri Hornnold as Nittaya
- Khwanruedi Klomklom as Weena
- Sarocha Watitapun as Onanong
- Nuttanee Sittisamarn as Nim
- Narilya Gulmongkolpetch Wianna Methamas (young)
- Benjasiri Watthana as Grace
- Tantachj Tharinpirom as Judo

== Original soundtracks ==
No.	Title	Lyrics	Music	Artist	Length
1.	"Be Number One" (Thai: เป็นหนึ่ง, romanized: Pen Neung)	THE MUST	Thitiwat Reongteong	Chaba Krittima	4:19
2.	"Rave" (Thai: คลั่ง, romanized: Klang)	Narongvit Techathanawat	Poramet Mueansanit	Issara Kitnitchi	5:12
3.	"Just" (Thai: แค่, romanized: Khae)	Narongvit Techathanawat	BANANA BOAT	Jannine Weigel	4:02
Total length:					13.33

== Reception ==
=== Thailand television ratings ===
- In the table below, the blue number represents the lowest ratings and the red number represents the highest ratings.

Episode No.	Timeslot (UTC+07:00)	Air date	Average audience share	Ref.
1	Wednesday and Thursdays; 8:30–10.25 pm	26 January 2022	2.411%	
2	Wednesday and Thursdays; 8:30–10.25 pm	27 January 2022	2.349%	
3	Wednesday and Thursdays; 8:30–10.25 pm	2 February 2022	2.355%	
4	Wednesday and Thursdays; 8:30–10.25 pm	3 February 2022	2.334%	
5	Wednesday and Thursdays; 8:30–10.25 pm	9 February 2022	2.544%	
6	Wednesday and Thursdays; 8:30–10.25 pm	10 February 2022	1.869%	
7	Wednesday and Thursdays; 8:30–10.25 pm	16 February 2022	2.009%	
8	Wednesday and Thursdays; 8:30–10.25 pm	17 February 2022	1.787%	
9	Wednesday and Thursdays; 8:30–10.25 pm	23 February 2022	1.911%	
10	Wednesday and Thursdays; 8:30–10.25 pm	24 February 2022	2.099%	
11	Wednesday and Thursdays; 8:30–10.25 pm	2 March 2022	2.141%	
12	Wednesday and Thursdays; 8:30–10.25 pm	3 March 2022	2.223%	
13	Wednesday and Thursdays; 8:30–10.25 pm	9 March 2022	2.580%	
14	Wednesday and Thursdays; 8:30–10.25 pm	10 March 2022	2.582%	
15	Wednesday and Thursdays; 8:30–10.25 pm	16 March 2022	2.187%	
16	Wednesday and Thursdays; 8:30–10.25 pm	17 March 2022	2.090%	
17	Wednesday and Thursdays; 8:30–10.25 pm	23 March 2022	2.395%	
18	Wednesday and Thursdays; 8:30–10.25 pm	24 March 2022	2.592%	
19	Wednesday and Thursdays; 8:30–10.25 pm	30 March 2022	2.337%	
20	Wednesday and Thursdays; 8:30–10.25 pm	31 March 2022	2.838%	
Average			2.282% ^{1}	

^1 Based on the average audience share per episode.
