= Nuttanicha Dungwattanawanich =

Thai actress (born 1996)

- ณัฏฐณิชา ดังวัธนาวณิชย์
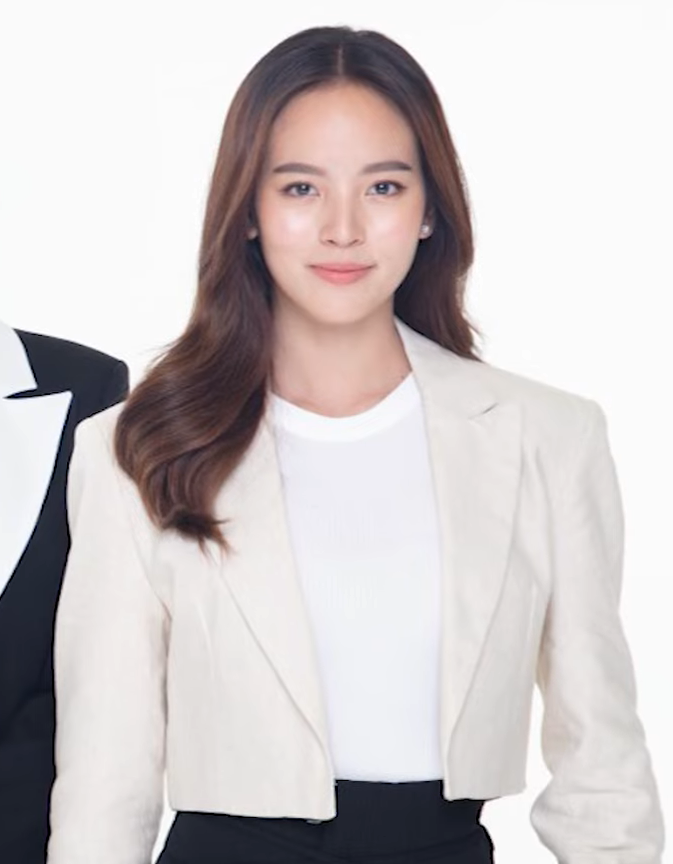
- Nuttanicha in 2023
- Born: Nuttanicha Dungwattanawanich; April 12, 1996 (age 30); Chiang Mai, Thailand
- Other name: Nychaa (ณิชา)
- Education: Bangkok University
- Occupation: Actress
- Years active: 2013–present
- Agents: Channel 3 (2013–2024); GMMTV (2026–present)
- Height: 5 ft 6.9 in (1.70 m)

Nuttanicha Dungwattanawanich (Thai: ณัฏฐณิชา ดังวัธนาวณิชย์, RTGS: Natthanicha Dangwatthanawanit, IPA: [nát.tʰà.ní.t͡ɕʰa: daŋ.wát.tʰá.naː.wá.nít]; born April 12, 1996), nicknamed Nycha (Thai: ณิชา; RTGS: Nicha; IPA: [ní.t͡ɕʰaː]), is a Thai actress. She is best known for her leading roles in television dramas such as Sapai Jao (2015), Nang Eye (2016), Plerng Prang Tian (2019), and Duang Jai Nai Montra (2021).

== Early life ==
Nuttanicha was born in Chiang Mai, Thailand, and is the middle child of three siblings. She attended Srivikorn High School and later graduated from Bangkok University with a bachelor's degree in Communication Arts. Originally nicknamed Baifern, her nickname was officially changed to Nycha upon entering the entertainment industry.

== Career ==
Nuttanicha's acting career began at age 17 after being scouted by talent manager Thaninth Faising. She subsequently signed with Channel 3 and made her television debut in 2013 with a guest appearance in Tong Neu Gao. In 2014, she landed her first main role as Wasaa, co-starring alongside Alexander Rendell in Sam Bai Mai Thao. She gained wider recognition for her leading roles as See in Sapai Jao (2015) and the titular character in Nang Eye (2016). She continued to star in several television dramas, including Plerng Prang Tian (2019) and Watsana Rak (2020).

In 2021, she starred as Matira / PraoPloy in Duang Jai Nai Montra, reuniting with her The Cupids Series: Kammathep Sorn Kol co-star Phakin Khamwilaisak. That same year, Nuttanicha made her feature film debut as Mai in the GDH horror film Ghost Lab (2021).

In 2022, she starred as Milin Weerayawanich in The Rivalry alongside Teeradetch Metawarayut, and portrayed Nuning in the drama series Retribution.

She followed this with leading roles in the television drama Devil-in-Law (2023) and the film I Love You Two Thousand (2023). In May 2024, Nuttanicha became a freelance actress after her contract with Channel 3 expired following over a decade with the network. Later that year, she starred in My Secret Zone (2024).

In 2025, she took on leading roles in Hala Bala and Ziam. In October of the same year, she appeared in the music video for BamBam's single "Wondering". In June 2026, it was announced that she had signed as an artist with GMMTV.

== Personal life ==
Nuttanicha dated Thai politician Parit Wacharasindhu for three years before the relationship ended in 2017. She was subsequently in a relationship from 2018 to 2025 with singer and actor Phakin Khamwilaisak, whom she met while filming The Cupids. In April 2025, she confirmed to the media that they had broken up.

== Filmography ==
Key
†	Denotes films that have not yet been released

=== Movies ===
Year	Title	Role	Ref.
2021	Ghost Lab	Mai	
2023	I Love You Two Thousand	Gib	
2025	Hala Bala	Wi	
2025	Ziam	Rin	

=== Television dramas ===
Year	Title	Role	Network	Notes
2013	Tong Neu Gao	"Som" Somruedi	Channel 3	Guest role
2014	Cubic	"Min" Meena	Channel 3	Guest role
2014	Sam Bai Mai Thao	"Wasaa" Wurawasaa	Channel 3	Main role
2015	Mafia Luerd Mungkorn: Raed	"Wi" Wiphada Leelawirotwong	Channel 3	Supporting role
2015	Sapai Jao	"See" Srijittra	Channel 3	Main role
2016	Nang Eye	"Nang" Apiradee Anothai	Channel 3	Main role
2017	Khluen Chiwit	"Dao" Daraka	Channel 3	Supporting role
2017	The Cupids: Kammathep Hunsa	Milin	Channel 3	Supporting role
2017	The Cupids: Kamathep Online	Milin	Channel 3	Supporting role
2017	The Cupids: Loob Korn Kammathep	Milin	Channel 3	Supporting role
2017	The Cupids: Sorn Ruk Kammathep	Milin	Channel 3	Supporting role
2017	The Cupids: Kammathep Sorn Kol	Milin	Channel 3	Main role
2018	Sanae Nang Ngiew	"Bua" Bongkot	Channel 3	Main role
2018	Lom Phrai Pook Rak	"Pon" Papapin	Channel 3	Main role
2019	Plerng Prang Tian	Kalin Raweerampa (Present) / Tiankhum (Past)	Channel 3	Main role
2020	Watsana Rak	"Roong" Klairoong Thepthong	Channel 3	Main role
2021	Duang Jai Nai Montra	Matira / PraoPloy	Channel 3	Main role
2022	The Rivalry	Milin Weerayawanich	Channel 3	Main role
2022	Koo Wein	Pream	Channel 3	Guest role
2022	Retribution	"Nuning" Na-Thada Yindeepongpreecha	Channel 3	Main role
2023	Devil-in-Law	"Pha" Pawinee Phipittapat	Channel 3	Main role
2024	My Secret Zone	"Nam" Chalalai Patthammanan	Channel 3	Main role
2025	Hypnotic	Sara / Kamol Thitraksa	One 31	Main role
TBA	My Chef in Crime	Lalit	TrueVisions NOW	Main role
TBA	Safety Flirt †	Suki	TBA	Main role
TBA	Itaewon Class: Thai Edition †	TBA	TBA	Main role

=== Music video appearances ===
Year	Title	Artist	Ref.
2013	"เพราะหัวใจไม่มีปาก"	Status Single	
2014	"มองแต่ไม่เห็น ฟังแต่ไม่ได้ยิน"	Saran Anning	
2018	"ขนมจีบ"	Tono & the Dust feat. Petch Saharat	
2023	"ยิ้มทั้งน้ำตา (Always)"	Billkin	
2023	"ขุด"	INDIGO	
2024	"Congratulations (ยินดีกับเธอ)"	Gulf Kanawut	
2025	"WONDERING"	BamBam	
2026	"หลุมอากาศ"	Palmy	

== Discography ==
=== Soundtrack appearances ===
Year	Title	Soundtrack	Label
2016	"Happy Birthday ช่อง 3" with James Ma	—N/a	Channel 3
2016	"Friends"	Nang Eye OST	Channel 3
2017	"หัวใจครึ่งดวง" with Araya A. Hargate, Jarinporn Joonkiat, Cris Horwang, Pichukkana Wongsarattanasin, Nicha Chokprajakchat, Thikamporn Ritta-apinan, Kannarun Wongkajornklai	The Cupids OST	Channel 3
2024	"My Sunshine"	My Secret Zone OST	Channel 3

== Concerts ==
Year	Title	Notes	Ref.
2017	LOVE IS IN THE AIR: Channel 3 Charity Concert	With Channel 3 artists	
2021	GULF The Next Stage	With Kanawut Traipipattanapong, Maylada Susri, Natapohn Tameeruks	

== Awards and nominations ==
Year	Award	Category	Nominated work	Result	Ref.
2014	Central Pattaya Beach Idea Award 2014	Most Beautiful Teenage Actress	—N/a	Won	
2015	TV3 Fan Club Award	Popular Female Rising Star	Sapai Jao	Won	
2016	Men's Health Guys Challenge	Naive Lady	—N/a	Won	
2018	31st Golden Television Awards	Outstanding Lead Actress	Nang Eye	Nominated	
2018	Kazz Awards	Female Rising Star of the Year	—N/a	Won	
2018	9th Nataraja Awards	Best Rising Star Actress	Sanae Nang Ngiew	Nominated	
2019	Howe Awards	Howe Shining Actress Award	—N/a	Won	
2021	Maya Awards	Charming Girl Award	—N/a	Won	
2023	19th Kom Chad Luek Awards	Best Actress	The Rivalry	Nominated	
2025	Lifestyle Asia Thailand 50 ICONS 2025	Global Icons	—N/a	Won	
2025	Feed x Khaosod Awards	Actress of The Year	Ziam	Nominated	
2026	15th Thai Film Director Awards	Best Actress	Hala Bala	Nominated	
2026	22nd Kom Chad Luek Awards	Best Actress	Hala Bala	Nominated	
2026	40th Golden Television Awards	Outstanding Leading Actress	Hypnotic	Pending	
