= Kannarun Wongkajornklai =

Thai actress (born 1991)

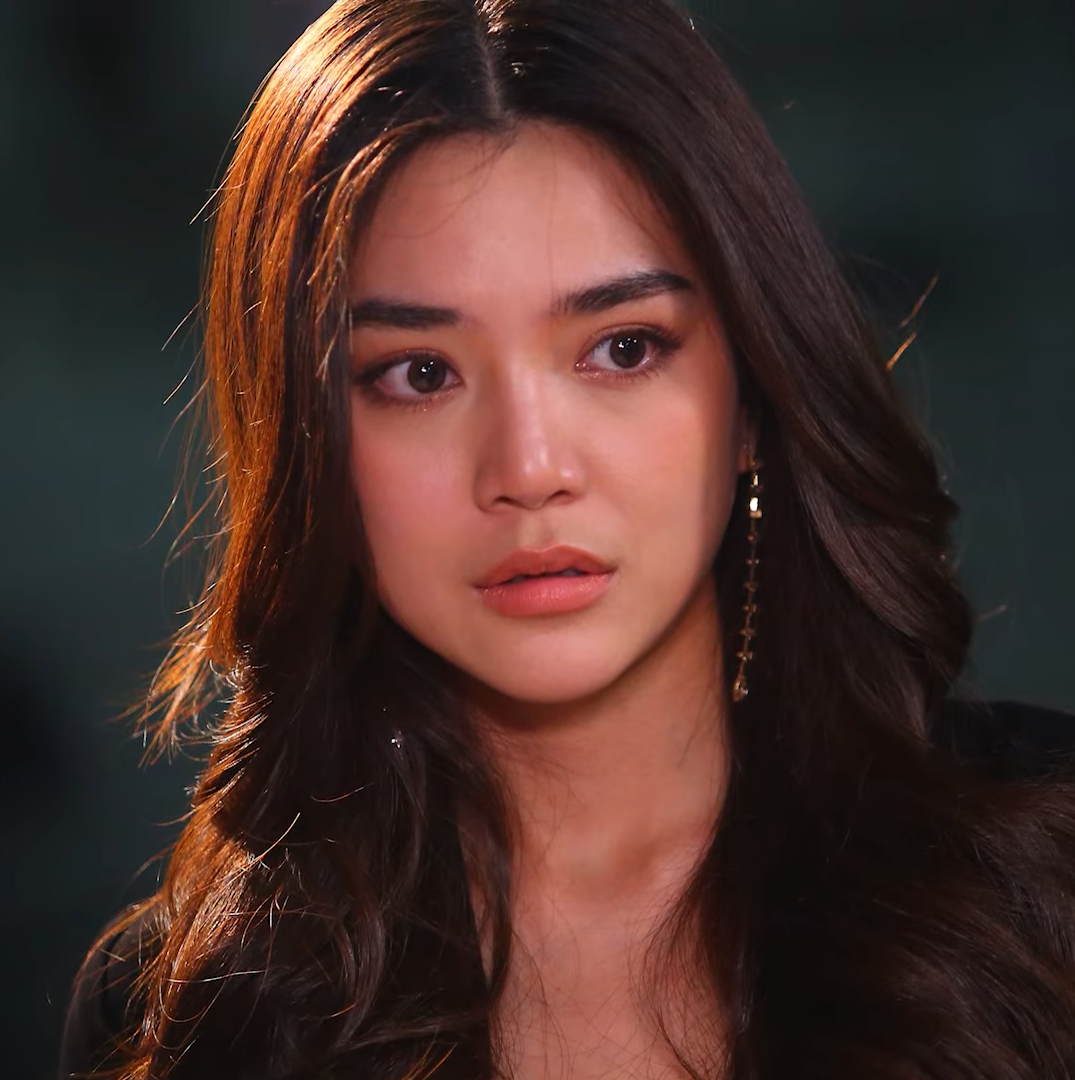
- Kannarun in 2022
- Born: April 5, 1991 (age 35)
- Other name: Prang
- Education: Mahidol University
- Occupations: Actress, Model, YouTuber
- Years active: 2009-present
- Height: 167 cm (5 ft 6 in)

Kannarun Wongkajornklai (Thai: กัญญ์ณรัณ วงศ์ขจรไกล; born 5 April 1991), nicknamed Prang, is a Thai actress known for playing Mae Ying Chan Wad in the historical period drama Love Destiny. She was under Broadcast Thai Television from 2010 to 2021.

== Early life and education ==
Kannaran was born on April 5, 1991and has two siblings. She graduated from Sarasas Witaed Bangbon School and a bachelor's degree from Mahidol University in the field of Tourism and Hospitality Management with first class honors.

== Career ==
She debuted in the industry after reaching the Final 15 of Miss Teen Thailand 2007. She had her first actjng role in Incidentally, Miss You Very Much (อนึ่ง คิดถึงเป็นอย่างยิ่ง) in 2009. She then signed under Broadcast Thai Television Company and had a role in the youth series Nong Mai Rhai Borisut, playing the role of Lin from 2010 to 2012.

She decided not to renew her contract with Broadcast Thai Television Company after it expired in 2021. Her first performance as a freelance actor was in the drama Fah Pieng Din on One 31 with Thanapat Kawila.

== Personal life ==
Kannaran was in a relationship with rapper Tong Pitawat Pruksakit, also known as Tong Twopee. The broke up in 2019 but began dating again in 2021 and got engaged in New YorK City. They eventually separated.

== Filmography ==
=== Television dramas ===
- 2013 Paen Rai Phai Ruk (แผนร้ายพ่ายรัก) (Master One VDO Production/Ch.3) as Pisa (พิศา)
- 2013 Dao Kaew Duen (ดาวเกี้ยวเดือน) (Broadcast Thai Television/Ch.3) as Khun Ying Nim (หม่อมราชวงศ์หญิงนิมมานรดี นพรัตน์ (คุณหญิงนิ่ม)) with Kong Karoon Sosothikul
- 2014 Phope Ruk (ภพรัก) (เมตตาและมหานิยม/Ch.3) as Buran (Naan) (ร้อยตำรวจตรีหญิง บุหรัน (หมวดแนน))
- 2015 Bang Rajan (บางระจัน) (Broadcast Thai Television/Ch.3) as Feung (เฟื่อง) with Phet Thakrit Hamannopjit
- 2016 Payak Rai Ruk Puan (สายลับรักป่วน) (Mindsatworktv Co., Ltd./Ch.3) as Tan (แตน) with Golf Pichaya Nitipaisankul
- 2017 Buang Banjathorn (บ่วงบรรจถรณ์) (Broadcast Thai Television/Ch.3) as Thongriew (เจ้านางตองริ้ว สุวรรณศักดิ์) with Nattawin Wattanagitiphat
- 2018 Love Destiny (บุพเพสันนิวาส) (Broadcast Thai Television/Ch.3) as Lady Chanwat, daughter of Lek and Nim (แม่หญิงจันทร์วาด) with Parama Imanothai
- 2018 Nak Soo Taywada (นักสู้เทวดา) (Step Power Three/Ch.3) as Hataya (หทยา เทพารักษ์ (ญา)) with Parama Imanothai
- 2020 Fah Fak Ruk (ฟ้าฝากรัก) (Broadcast Thai Television/Ch.3) as Yoga Instructor (พิธีกรรายการ VOGA enternity) (Cameo)
- 2020 Mia Archeep (เมียอาชีพ) (Step Power Three/Ch.3) as Chollada (Dao) (ชลลดา (ดาว)) with Mai Warit Sirisantana
- 2021 Duang Jai Nai Montra (ดวงใจในมนตรา) (Broadcast Thai Television/Ch.3) as Wasita (Wanda) (วาสิตา (แวนด้า)) with Peter Corp Dyrendal
- 2021 Khun Pee Chuay Duay (Help Me คุณผีช่วยด้วย) (TV Scene & Picture/Ch.3) as Arnong (Nong) (อนงค์ (นงค์)) with Chantavit Dhanasevi & Weerakhan Kanwattanakun
- 2022 Fah Pieng Din (2022) (ฟ้าเพียงดิน) (The One Enterprise/One 31) as Chompoo / Sarika Sarayuttapichai (ชมพู่ / สาลิกา สรายุทธพิชัย) with Thanapat Kawila
- 2022 Sai Lub Lip Gloss (สายลับลิปกลอส) (Broadcast Thai Television/Ch.3) as Yadpirun Khanjanawithoo (Pon) (หยาดพิรุณ กาญจนวิธู (ฝน)) with Parama Imanothai
- 20 Love Destiny 2 (พรหมลิขิต) (Broadcast Thai Television/Ch.3) as Lady Chanwat, daughter of Lek and Nim (แม่หญิงจันทร์วาด) with Parama Imanothai

=== Television series ===
- 2010 - 2012 Nong Mai Rai Borisut (น้องใหม่ร้ายบริสุทธิ์) (Broadcast Thai Television/Ch.3) as Lin (หลิน)
- 2015 (บันทึกกรรม ตอน เงื่อน/ตาย) (Mindsatworktv/Ch.3) as Aorapreeya (อรปรียา)
- 2016 (บันทึกกรรม ตอน เสน่ห์ยาแฝด) (Mindsatworktv/Ch.3) as Nida (นิดา)
- 2017 The Cupids Series Part 7 : Kammathep Jum Laeng (บริษัทรักอุตลุด เรื่อง กามเทพจำแลง) (Broadcast Thai Television/Ch.3) as Prima (พริมา) with Teeradetch Metawarayut

=== Television sitcom ===
- 20 Pen Tor (เป็นต่อ ตอน) (The One Enterprise/One 31) as () () (Cameo)

=== Film ===
- 2009 Miss You Again (2009) (อนึ่ง คิดถึงเป็นอย่างยิ่ง) (Five Star Production) as Jang (แจง)
- 2021 Haunted Tales (2021) (เรื่อง ผี เล่า ตอน ไปผุดไปเกิด) (M39) as Thiwa (ทิวา) with Arak Amornsupasiri & Prin Suparat

=== Music video appearances ===
- 2020 Ham (ห้าม) Ost.Mia Archeep - Wan Wanwan (Chandelier Music/YouTube:Ch3Thailand Music)
- 2022 Par Ter (แพ้เธอ) Ost.Fah Pieng Din - ภูมิ แก้วฟ้าเจริญ (The One Enterprise/YouTube:one31) with Film Thanapat Kawila

== Hosting ==
Online

- 2020 : ไปกับแม๊ EP. 1 On Air YouTube:Ladiiprang
