= Gossip Girl: Thailand =

Thai TV series

- Promotional poster
- Genre: Teen drama
- Created by: Cecily von Ziegesar (books), Josh Schwartz and Stephanie Savage (original TV series)
- Developed by: Chookiat Sakveerakul
- Starring: Sabina Meisinger; Carissa Springett; Patrick Chanon Makaramani; Chanon Ukkharachata; Victor Jarusak Weerakul; Nutcha Jeka; Penny Lane
- Narrated by: Opal Panisara (as Gossip Girl)
- Country of origin: Thailand
- Original language: Thai
- No. of seasons: 1
- No. of episodes: 18

Production
- Production locations: Bangkok, Thailand
- Running time: 50 minutes
- Production companies: Kantana Group; InTouch

Original release
- Network: Channel 3
- Release: July 16 – November 19, 2015

Related
- Gossip Girl (2007–2012)

Gossip Girl: Thailand (Thai: กอสซิป เกิร์ล ไทยแลนด์) is a Thai teen drama television series produced by Kantana Group and InTouch, based on the American television series Gossip Girl (2007–2012). The first and only season aired on Channel 3 from July 16 to November 19, 2015, for 18 episodes.

Filming started on March 17, 2015, at Swissôtel Nai Lert Park Hotel and ended in early October. An uncut version was uploaded on Kantana Group's YouTube channel on December 30, 2015.

== Plot ==
Serena Wijitranukul returns to Bangkok following her mysterious disappearance: everyone is extremely shocked including her best friend, Blair Waranon. Blair soon finds out that Serena had slept with her boyfriend, Nate Achirawat, the night of her disappearance. Meanwhile, Serena begins dating Dan Chanaseri while Nate struggles with his feelings for Blair. The two try to salvage what's left of their relationship, only leaving Blair to lose her virginity to Nate's best friend, Jak Benjakij, instead. In the meantime, Jenny Chanaseri constantly tries to make it in this upscale world by following around Blair and her friends.

== Characters ==
- Sabina Meisinger as Serena Wijitranukul
- Carissa Springett as Blair Waranon
- Victor Jarusak Weerakul as Dan Chanaseri
- Chanon Ukkharachata as Jak Benjakij
- Patrick Chanon Makaramani as Nate Achirawat
- Penny Lane as Sa, Dan's best friend
- Nutcha Jeka as Jenny Chanaseri
- Phan Pagniez as Eric Wijitranukul
- Pete Puntakarn Thongjure as Jo Chanaseri, Dan and Jenny's father
- Cindy Burbridge as Lily Wijitranukul, Serena and Eric's mother
- Ampha Phoosit as Araya, Blair's mother
- Byron Bishop as Songpol Achirawat "The Captain", Nate's father
- Angsana Buranon as Phloi, Nate's mother
- Toon Hiranyasap as Burn Benjakij, Jak's father
- Kejmanee Pichaironnarongsongkhram as Ann, Dan and Jenny's mother
- Sirinuch Petchurai as Phim, Blair's housemaid
- –– as Saiphin, Lily's mother
- Cherlyn Wagstaffe as Kate, Blair's friend
- Ratchaneeboon Pheinwikraisophon as Bell, Blair's friend
- Malinee Adelaide Coates as Geegee Cholticha, Serena's ex friend
- Suchao Pongwilai as Rattapoom Waranon, Blair's father
- Opal Panisara as Gossip Girl (voice)

== Accolades ==
| Year | Award | Category | Nominee(s) | Result | Ref. |
|---|---|---|---|---|---|
| 2016 | 4th Daw Mekhla Awards | Female Rising Star | Carissa Springett | Won | |
