= Ziam =

2025 Thai action-horror film

- Promotional release poster
- Thai: ปากกัด ตีนถีบ
- Directed by: Kulp Kaljareuk
- Screenplay by: Kulp Kaljareuk; Nut Nualpang; Weerasu Worrapot; Vatanyu Ingkavivat; Chonnatee Pimnam
- Produced by: Nattapong Suriya
- Starring: Johnny Anfone; Nuttanicha Dungwattanawanich; Prin Suparat
- Distributed by: Netflix
- Release date: July 9, 2025
- Country: Thailand
- Language: Thai

Ziam (Thai: ปากกัด ตีนถีบ) is a 2025 Thai action horror film directed by Kulp Kaljareuk. The film stars Prin Suparat, Nuttanicha Dungwattanawanich, and Wanvayla Boonnithipaisit. It was released globally on Netflix on July 9, 2025, and combines elements of martial arts and zombie survival horror. The film received attention for its fast-paced action sequences, Muay Thai choreography, and dystopian setting.

The film was released worldwide on Netflix, received positive reviews from critics, and reached the number one spot on Netflix's top ten movies worldwide.

== Plot ==
In a dystopian future, the world is suffering from food shortages and natural disasters caused by climate change, with melting ice caps releasing bacteria millions of years old. Thailand has barely managed to stay afloat thanks to innovative but risky experiments like breeding insects for food, but has descended into an oppressive police state.

Singh, a former Muay Thai fighter, wants to return to his hometown of Chiang Dao to start a quiet life with his girlfriend Rin, a doctor. On his final mission, Singh travels to Bangkok with his superior, Kriang, to deliver containers carrying fish from a sunken freighter on behalf of VS Corporation, a powerful agricultural company. Unbeknownst to them, the fish is contaminated by an unknown pathogen, which makes a senior official of VS fall ill. He is taken to the hospital where Rin is working and dies before reanimating and biting patients and staff, starting a zombie infection that leads to the hospital being locked down. Learning of the announcement over a PA system, Singh sneaks into the hospital and fights his way to search for Rin, who is hiding upstairs. Along the way, he meets Rin's friend, a boy named Buddy who tells him to incapacitate the zombies by hitting them in the head.

The military orders commandos to rescue Vasu, the head of VS, who is in a secure location of the hospital alongside his wife Anne, who is confined in a hospital in a coma for an incurable disease, before blowing up the hospital with pre-planted explosives to prevent the outbreak from spreading. Rin, who had previously taken care of Anne, manages to reach his room. Vasu guarantees Rin's safety in exchange for taking care of Anne, only to abandon Rin when the commandos arrive with their own medic to extract the couple. Meanwhile, Singh and Buddy reach the latter's mother Meena, a nurse at the neonatal ward. Meena tells Singh of Rin's whereabouts and entrusts Buddy to his care before sending them away. As Buddy tries to return, Meena reveals herself to be infected and reanimates in front of them before devouring the infants in the ward, prompting Buddy and Singh to leave.

After being abandoned by Vasu, Rin is cornered by zombies but is rescued by Singh and Buddy. As they try to escape, Singh is shot by the commandos who take Rin after the zombies kill their medic. As Rin is led away, Singh recovers and knocks down the commandos before collapsing from his injuries. As Rin treats him, Singh proposes to her and promises to return to Chiang Dao with her. Buddy discovers that one of the commandos has reanimated, forcing Singh to throw a Molotov cocktail at him. The resulting fire activates the hospital's sprinklers and inadvertently reactivates the dormant zombies who chase after Singh and his group. As they escape, they come across Vasu and Anne, who had been bitten when the commandos were attacked. Vasu, believing that Anne has reawakened, allows himself to be overwhelmed by the zombies.

Singh, Rin and Buddy make their way to the hospital's helipad, where the remaining commandos have landed a helicopter. Singh stays behind to divert the zombies to the hospital's car park, but is trapped by a swarm of zombies inside a car, forcing him to detonate an explosive device which kills the zombies. Singh manages to escape and reach the helipad, but again decides to stay behind to stop more zombies following Rin and Buddy, who have been extracted by the commandos. As the helicopter takes off, Rin and Buddy tearfully watch as Singh fights the zombies before the building is demolished by the explosives.

Rin arrives in Chiang Dao and is seen pondering while wearing Singh's ring. In a mid-credits scene, Singh is revealed to have survived by seeking shelter inside a storage tank, killing a surviving zombie as he emerges from the wreckage of the hospital.

== Cast and characters ==
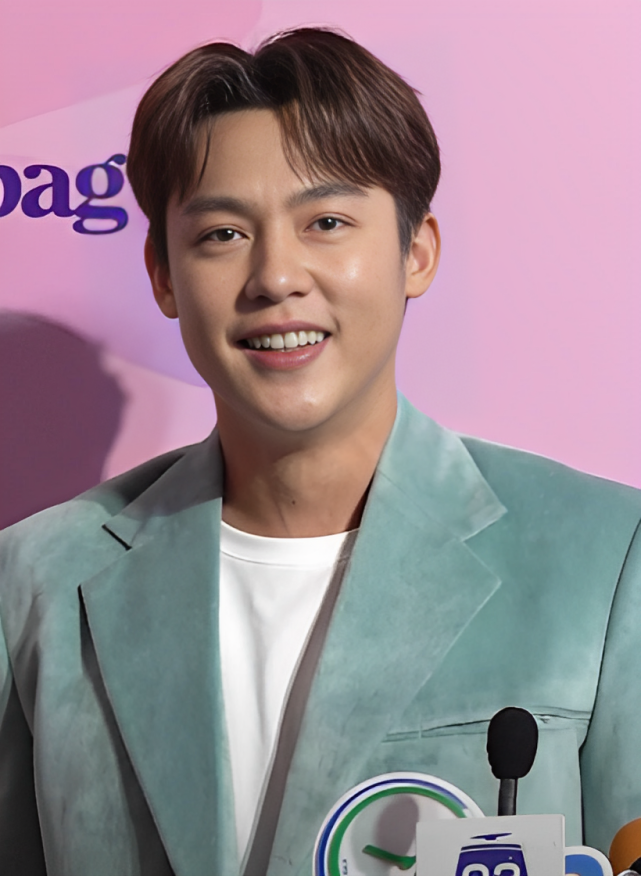
Prin Suparat

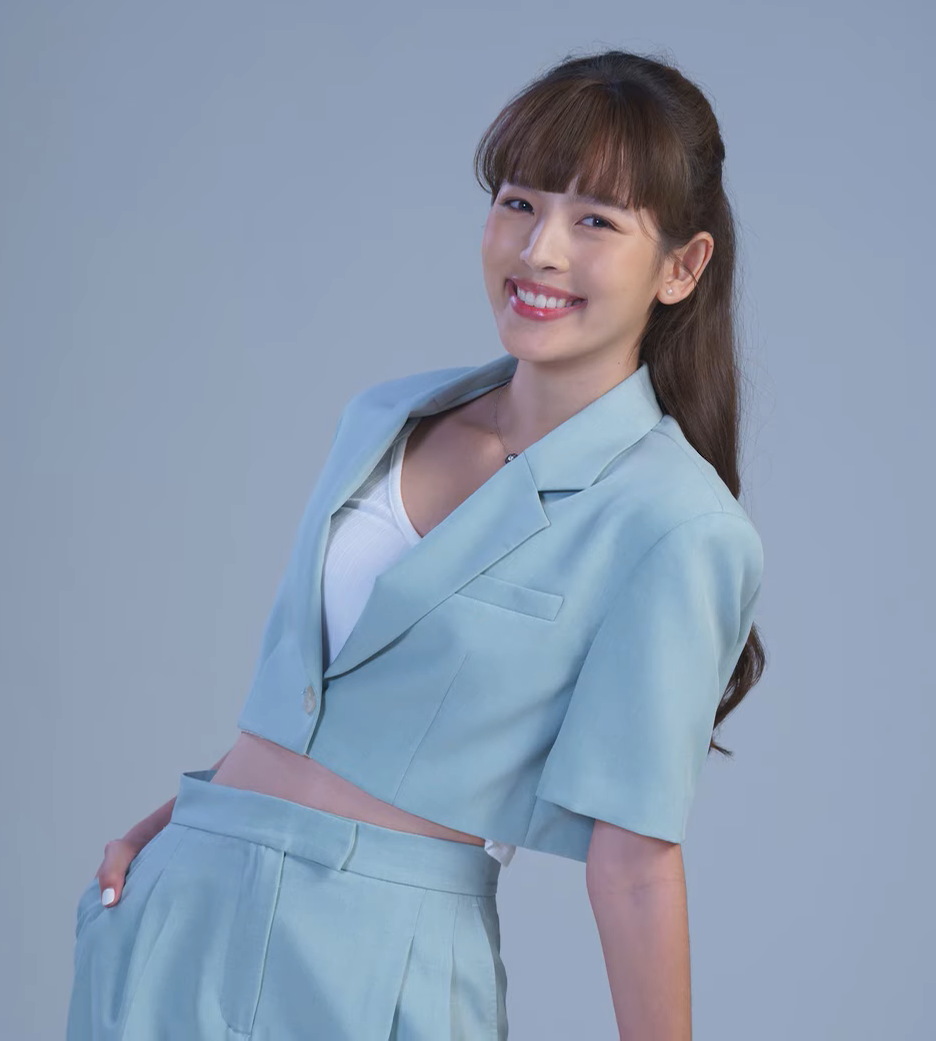
Nuttanicha Dungwattanawanich

- Prin Suparat as Singh, a former Muay Thai fighter
- Nuttanicha Dungwattanawanich as Rin, a hospital doctor and Singh's girlfriend
- Wanvayla Boonnithipaisit as Buddy, a child survivor
- Johnny Anfone as General Chai
- Pimmada Boriruksuppakorn as Nurse Meena
- Jason Young as Dr. Niran

== Production ==
Kulp Kaljareuk directed the film, while the script was written by Nut Nualpang, Weerasu Worrapot, Vatanyu Ingkavivat, and Chonnatee Pimnam.

Kaljareuk explained to Netflix that he wanted to explore what it is like to fight zombies using Muay Thai, and added that no CGI was used to create the raw and gory flesh; each zombie was crafted with just makeup and practical effects. The title of the film comes from Thailand's historical name, Siam, but with a "Z" for "zombies."

== Release ==
The film was released on Netflix on July 9, 2025.

== Reception ==
The film received positive reviews and ranked highly on many viewership charts after it was released on Netflix. On the review aggregator website Rotten Tomatoes, 83% of 12 critics' reviews are positive.

Mary Kassel of Screen Rant gave the film a rating of 5 out of 10 and said; Ziam comes close to hitting upon something new, but it retreats to safer territory every time.

Gavia Baker-Whitelaw of Inverse gave the film positive feedback and wrote; "Derivative it may be, but there's always an audience for "cool guy kicks a bunch of monsters in the head," and director Kulp Kaljareuk knows how to keep that audience happy."

Jim Vorel of Paste gave the film a rating of 6.2 out of 10 and said; "This isn't vintage Tony Jaa, but most of the fight scenes–particularly when Singh has a human opponent to square off against rather than just a zombie charging him–are satisfyingly and unsparingly brutal."

Alan Jacques of Limerick Post gave the film a rating of 2 out of 5 and wrote; "This Southeast Asian flick has plenty going for it but, sadly, it doesn't take any risks or try and break its ghoulish mould. It's let down by a halfhearted final act, while setting itself up for what will probably be a reserved and rather disappointing sequel, and proves as memorable as an Irish Eurovision entry."

== See also ==
- List of horror films of 2025
- List of Netflix original films (since 2025)
