= Duang Jai Nai Montra =

2021 Thai television drama

- Also known as: Heart of the Montra; The Curse of Love
- Original title: ดวงใจในมนตรา
- Genre: Romance; Drama; Supernatural
- Starring: Phakin Khamwilaisak; Nuttanicha Dungwattanawanich; Peter Corp Dyrendal; Kannarun Wongkajornklai
- Opening theme: ถ้าไร้เธอ by Phakin Khamwilaisak
- Ending theme: สุดท้าย by Lydia Sarunrat Deane
- Country of origin: Thailand
- Original language: Thai
- No. of episodes: 16

Production
- Producer: Arunocha Bhanubandhu
- Running time: 81 minutes
- Production company: Broadcast Thai Television

Original release
- Network: Channel 3
- Release: January 27 – March 18, 2021

Duang Jai Nai Montra (Thai: ดวงใจในมนตรา) is a Thai television drama. It starred Phakin Khamwilaisak, Nuttanicha Dungwattanawanich, Peter Corp Dyrendal, and Kannarun Wongkajornklai. It aired on Channel 3 from January 27, 2021, to March 18, 2021.

== Synopsis ==
Pachara (Phakin Khamwilaisak) was a former warrior of Tarawapuram, an ancient kingdom over a thousand years ago. He was cursed by his lover named Matira (Nuttanicha Dungwattanawanich). Because of the curse, Pachara could never die and suffers from seeing his loved ones die for over a thousand years. After thousands of years, he meets Praoploy, an artist with heart disease. As soon as he sees Praoploy, he feels that it was the reincarnation of his past love Matira. Is Praoploy really Matira?

== Cast ==
=== Main ===
- Phakin Khamwilaisak (Tono) as Pachara Thanapunat Prechmaneewong (President of Phachara Group)
- Nuttanicha Dungwattanawanich (Baifern, Nicha) as Matira / PraoPloy Kamolwichian (Prao) (Playapol's younger sister/Primpak's older sister)
- Peter Corp Dyrendal (Peter) as Praipol Kamolwichian (Pol) (Proud Ploy and Prim Face's older brothers)
- Kannarun Wongkajornklai (Prang) as Wandara (Wan) / Wasita (Wanda) (Wasan's daughter)
- Chaiyapol Julien Poupart (New) as Wipoo Phasanatecho (Poo) (President of V Estress)
- Lorena Schuett (Lena) as Primphak Kamolwichian (Prim) (Plaiphon and Proudploy's youngest sisters)

=== Supporting ===
- Kanticha Chumma (Ticha) as Karisa Stone (Rollno Ronald's daughter)
- Atthama Chiwanitchaphan (Bowie) as Matinee (Nee) (Wiphoo's secretary)
- Paweenut Pangnakorn (Pookie) as Somornsri (Morn) (Younger version of Plaiphon)
- Montree Jenuksorn (Pu) as Sindu (Phachara's secretary)
- Anant Boonnark (A) as Watson (Wasita's father)
- Virakarn Seneetantikul (Maprang) as Orn (Mrs. Aoi's sister)
- Janya Thanasawangkul (Ya) as Oi (Mrs. On's sister)
- Ramida Prapasanobon (Noon) as Kala (Kalah's daughter/Pachara's servant)
- Worapot Fanthamkang (Phukhao) as Nukul (Nu) (Assistant secretary of Dr. Pachara)
- Anavil Charttong (Best) as Khem (Pachara's servant)
- Surasak Chaiat (Nu) as Krai (Kalah's father/Pachara's servant)

=== Guest appearances ===
- Lapassalan Jiravechsoontornkul (Mild) as Mika (daughter of a Japanese general/Proud Ploy's former life) (Ep.9)
- Apinan Prasertwattankul (M) as Field marshal of Imperial Japanese Army (Mika's father) (Ep.9)
- Kanokchat Manyaton (Typhoon) as Prince Isara (Half-brother of Prince Phachara and Prince Rutara) (Ep.4,5,6,7,8)
- Papangkorn Lerkchaleampote (Beam) as Prince Ruthara (Half-brother of Prince Phachara and Prince Issara) / Charles (Interpol) (Ep.4,5,6,7,8,15,16)
- Marilyn Kate Gardner (Kate) as Ladtha (Proud Ploy's former life) (Ep.2,4,5,6,7,8,11,12,13,14,16)
- Pattharapon ToOun (Ron) as Wasudha (Half-brother of Prince Rudra and brother Matira) (Ep.4,5,6,7,8)
- Kaliya Niehuns (Lita) as Chantra Sintuthrp (Ep.2,4,5,6,7,8,11,12,13,14,16)
- Wayne Falconer (Wayne) as Sunthornresaracha (Father Prince Issara, Prince Pachara and Prince Rudra) (Ep.4,5,6,7,8)
- Tanongsak Supakan as Suthichai (Chief Minister Suraya)
- Praptpadol Suwanbang (Prap) as Junlaka (Lord of the Tarawapuram Kingdom/Father Chandra) (Ep.4,5,6,7,8)
- Sueangsuda Lawanprasert (Namfon) as Suchawadee (Sister of Chancellor Suraya/Mother Vasudha and Prince Rutara) (Ep.4,5,6,7,8)
- Paweena Charivsakul (Jeab) as Phimphiman (Prince Isara's mother) (Ep.4,5,6,7)
- Narissan Lokavit (New) as Sinthu (Sinthu's past life) (Ep.4,5,8)
- Wimonpan Chaleejunghan (Jubjang) as (Prince Pachara's mother) (Ep.4,5,6,7)
- Lilly McGrath (Dear) as Poodle (Praipol's friend) (Ep.1,2,9,10)
- Chatchawan Petchvisit (Keng) as Royal Thai Police (Ep.13,14)
- Meenay Jutai (Mamameenay) as Wiruthai (Wi Phu's aunt) (Ep.9,11,12)
- Tor Techathuwanan as Suriya (The magnate Phachara's worker) (Ep.10,12,13)
- Narumon Phongsupan (Koy) as Wipoo's mother (Ep.15)
- Chotiros Chayowan (Sobee) as Praipol PraoPloy and Primphak's mother (Ep.12)
- Alexander Ty Manoiu (Ty) as Saki (Japanese Soldier/Sinthu's past life) (Ep.9)
- Jenifer Robert (Jenny) as Bam (PraoPloy's friend) (Ep.1)
- Rachawat Klipngern (Mix) as Praipol PraoPloy and Primphak's father (Ep.12)
- Siwakorn Wiroaddun () as Doctor (Ep.1,10,12,16)
- Saifon Cheechang (Saifon) as Journalist (Ep.1,11,12)
- Setsongpol Kammung (Not) as board of directors V Estress (Ep.1)
- Opad Sittipian () as board of directors V Estress (Ep.1)
- Soontorn Meesri (Jim) as Dr. Sakol (Lecturer from the Fine Arts Department) (Ep.1,2,4,9,11,12)
- Daranphob Suriyawong () as Stuntman (Ep.1)
- Ektawan Kumchad () as Mayor of Koh Phet City (Ep.1,2)
- Thanakorn Premjindakamol () as Royal Thai Police (Ep.3)
- Kittiphon Ketmanee (Poo) as Weera (Wipoo's father) (Ep.3,15)
- Sunthari Chotipun (Nong) as Wipoo's stepmother (Ep.3)
- Watcharachai Sundarasiri (Ant) as Fortune Teller of the Taravapuram Kingdom (Ep.4,5,7,)
- Malee Thaworn () as Villager (Ep.4)
- Panyakorn Sornmayura (Pod) as Royal Thai Police (Ep.5,6,12)
- Kasem Saimoon () as Royal Thai Police (Ep.5,6,13,)
- Apisatha Srisupan () as Nurse (Ep.8)
- Nawaporn Supingklad () as Nurse (Ep.8,9)
- Worathanapoj Tantiviriyangkul () as Weepoo (Wipoo's father) (Ep.9)
- Punnapat Maneewan (Bas) as Japanese Soldier (Ep.9)
- as Geena (Bodyguard Karisa) (Ep.10,11,12,13,15)
- as Deelance (Bodyguard Karisa) (Ep.10,11,12,13,15)
- Wanthanee Chana-Chai-Yang-Young () as Kun nai (Ep.12)
- Wasan Jadklam () as Royal Thai Police (Ep.12)
- Ratthawat Akarapisalwattana () as Royal Thai Police (Ep.12,13,14)
- as Praipol (chird) (Ep.12)
- as PraoPloy (chird) (Ep.12)
- Napattanan nimjirawat (mild) as Prim (chird) (Ep.12)
- Paitoon Songubon (Noom) as Stuntman (Ep.13)
- Wiwat Rattanapitak () as Royal Thai Police (Ep.13,14)
- Kreingkai Ounkaew () as Royal Thai Police (Ep.13,14)
- Chanon Leidwasuporn () as Royal Thai Police (Ep.13)
- Jaruwat Thongboran () as Royal Thai Police (Ep.13)
- Somjat Thongpreche () as Royal Thai Police (Ep.14)
- as Rollno Ronald Stone (Karisa's father) (Ep.15)
- as Andrew (Interpol) (Ep.15,16)
- as Metha (Royal Thai Police) (Ep.15,16)

== Original soundtrack ==
Song title	Artist	Notes	Ref.
ถ้าไร้เธอ (If without you)	Phakin Khamwilaisak	Opening Theme	
สุดท้าย (Finally)	Lydia Sarunrat Deane	Closing Theme	
