= Chomchai Chatvilai =

Thai actress and singer

- โฉมฉาย ฉัตรวิไล
- Born: วัลชุลี ฉัตรวิไล (Walchuli Chatwilai); 31 October 1950; Phra Nakhon province (present-day Bangkok), Thailand
- Died: 20 June 2024 (aged 73); Ramkhamhaeng Hospital
- Other name: Add (แอ๊ด)
- Occupations: Actress; singer
- Years active: 1965 – 2024

Chomchai Chatvilai (Thai: โฉมฉาย ฉัตรวิไล, also spelled Chatwilai; 31 October 1950 – 20 June 2024) was a Thai actress and singer.

== Early life ==
Chomchai entered the entertainment industry at the age of six as a singer in Chamras's music troupe. In 1965, she won first place in a singing contest on Rak Rakphong's program, propelling her to fame. Subsequently, she performed in stage plays and television dramas on Channel 4. She went on to star in numerous films and continues to be an active figure in the entertainment industry, participating in stage plays, television series, and films. Her impressive filmography includes 57 films, 181 television series, and 6 stage plays.

== Death ==
Chomchai was suffering from an underlying illness and had lost a significant amount of weight. She retired from the entertainment industry to focus on her health. she died on 20 June at Ramkhamhaeng Hospital. She was 73 years and 233 days old. A Christian funeral service was held between 23–25 June 2024, at Holy of Holies Church, Pun Rak Pium Suk Foundation. Her cremation ceremony took place on 26 June 2024 at Wat Phra Si Mahathat in Bang Khen district, Bangkok.

== Filmography ==
=== Films ===
Year	Title	Role
1975	Tawan Tok Din	Support Role
1975	Mai Mee Krai Ruk Chun Jing	Support Role
1975	Nangek	Support Role
1976	Games	Support Role

=== Television series ===
Year	Title	Role
1977	Soifah Khai Tua	Support Role
1977	Rak Prakasit	Malinee
1977	Sakao Duean	Neth Mayurarit
1980	Pin Rak	Support Role
1982	Songkram Pitsawat	Support Role
1982	E-Sa	Nim Raweewan
1983	Ruea Manut	Mathurot
1983	Ubathteehet	Sirisuda
1984	Mongkut Fang	Support Role
1985	Benjarong 5 See	Support Role
1985	Ruea Manut	Fueng
1986	Mattika	Phaka
1986	Sai Lohit	Jao Jom Maen
1987	Dao Rueang	BanCheun
1988	Lai Hong	Sida (Chadin's girlfriend)
1988	Game Kammathep	Support Role
1989	Mia Taeng	Phawan
1989	Dok Fah Lae Dome Poo Jong Hong	Support Role
1989	Look Tard	King (Kaew's mother)
1989	Tha Chalom	Support Role
1990	Sai Lom Mook	Support Role
1990	Long Reur Ha Ruk	Support Role
1990	Sarb Sawat	Wanlee
1991	Sao Noi Roi Chang	Support Role
1992	Thang Khong	Support Role
1992	Asoon Rerng Fai	Support Role
1992	Jao Jorm	Guest Role
1993	Khun Ying Puang Kae	Support Role
1993	Ngao Ruk	Support Role
1993	Yam Mur Lom Pat Huan	Support Role
1994	Sao Ramwong	Support Role
1994	Saeng Soon	Support Role
1994	Mae Taeng Rom Bai	Support Role
1995	Hua Jai Teuan	Aunt Pring
1995	Preuksa Sawad	Prapatsorn
1995	Pulom	Support Role
1995	Jao Por Jum Pen	Chaweewan
1996	Mai Orn	Support Role
1996	Trab Dai Tee Hua Jai Yang Ten	Support Role
1997	Yark Dai Tur Wai Kon Diew	Support Role
1997	Sor Sam Sai	Support Role
1998	Mae Dok Kratin	Boonpriew
1998	Lueam Salub Lai	Support Role
1998	Bangkert Klao	Support Role
1998	Chai Mai Jing Ying Tae	Pao's mother
1999	Gerd Tae Chard Pang Nai	Support Role
1999	Dod Diew Mai Diew Dai	Arada (Burapha's mother)
1999	Sao Noi Pra Pang	Piangboon (Phunpen's mother)
2000	Hong Neu Mangkorn	Sosa
2000	Ra Rerng Fai	Support Role
2001	Kor Yood Hua Jai Wai Piang Ther	Aunt Yot
2001	Yod Pradtana	Support Role
2001	Lang Likhit	Im
2001	Jao Mae Jum Pen	Chaitawan
2002	Ruam Pon Kon Chai	Support Role
2002	Pi Nai Gum	Support Role
2002	Champion Sabad Chor	Support Role
2003	Tup Tawan	Support Role
2003	Buang Lae Sanaeha	Support Role
2003	Wimarn Din	Support Role
2003	Nang Show	Support Role
2004	Ruk Plaeng Rit	Support Role
2004	Sompong Nong Somchai	Ah-Ma
2004	Keng Mai Keng Mai Kaew	Support Role
2004	Keui Ma Lee Gun	Support Role
2005	Sum Pao Thong	Support Role
2005	Roy Likit	Support Role
2005	Mer Wan Fah Plean See	Support Role
2006	Wo Ai Ni Kho Yut Chai Wai Thi Thoe	Support Role
2006	Jao Sao Kathanhan	Support Role
2006	Pooyai Hed Gamnan Hoi	Support Role
2006	Thee Trakoon Song	Mey
2008	Pou Karn Reua Reh	Support Role
2008	Kaew Lorm Petch	Sajee
2009	Sakul Ga	Rath's mother
2009	Namphueng Khom	Thim (Housekeeper)
2009	Proong Nee Gor Ruk Ter	Fongchantha
2010	Roong Rao	Prik
2010	Dok Ruk Rim Tang	Paung
2010	Kularb Rai Narm	Phuangsoi
2011	Kehas See Dang	Prom
2011	Wanalee	Somsawat Thepwong
2011	Karm Wayla Ha Ruk	Yainoi
2012	Likit Fah Cha Ta Din	Granny Sali
2012	Khun Seuk	Amphan
2012	Ruk Khun Tao Fah	Chinda
2013	Raeng Pradtanaha	Chanchamnong
2013	Koo Gum	Sorn (Angsumalin's grandmother)
2013	Porn Prom Onlaweng	Prongthong
2013	Khun Chai Pawornruj	Thongsuk
2013	Khun Chai Ronaphee	Thongsuk
2013	Samee	Limwatthanathawornkul
2013	Ruk Sutrit	Thanom
2014	Look Tard	On
2014	Kuan Kaan Tong Gub Gang Por Pla Lai	Kanda
2014	Sai See Plerng	Teacher Nari
2015	Stupid Cupid	Grandmother
2015	Kor Pen Jaosao Suk Krung Hai Cheun Jai	Grandma Primprao
2015	Sapai Jao	Unreun's mother
2015	Fai Lang Fai	Paa Pen
2016	City of Light: The O.C. Thailand	Napa
2016	Patiharn	Support Role
2016	Nang Eye	Sister St. Audrey
2016	Sut Rak Chunlamun	Pong's grandmother
2017	Petch Klang Fai	Saeng
2017	Muean Khon La Fark Fah	Lamoot
2017	The Cupids Series: Sorn Ruk Kammathep	Nantisa's grandmother
2017	Paen Rai Long Tai Wa Rak	Rasamee
2017	The Single Mom	Monthathip
2017	Ruk Long Rohng	Khwan
2018	Sanae Nang Ngiew	Teacher
2018	Ban Saran Land: Rak Lon Lon Khon Tem Ban	Janya Rungrueang
2018	Rup Thong	Support Role
2018	Bangkok Naruemit	Wad's grandmother
2018	Rim Fung Nam	Muan
2018	Khun Prab Darb Kham Pope	Mae Mian / Ya Miang
2019	2 Brothers	Sompit
2019	Krong Kam	Lim
2019	Bussaba Puen Foon	Nuankae
2019	Aruna 2019	Grandmother
2020	Mist of Love	Sitang’s grandmother
2021	Kaew Lerm Korn	Grandmother Kaenjan
2021	World of Himmapan	Support Role
2021	My Little Saucy Girl	Nim
2023	Come Dance With Me My Love	Saithong
2024	Surviving Beauty	Op-choei
