= Carissa Springett =

Thai actress and model

- คารีสา สปริงเก็ตต์
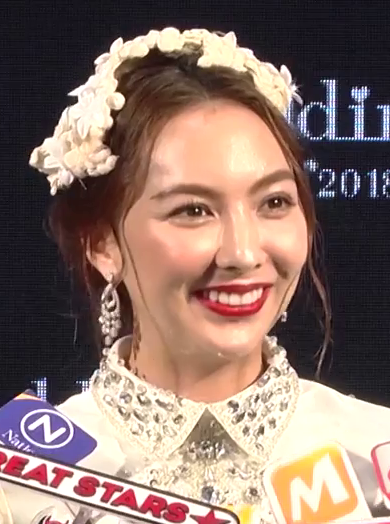
- Springett at Wedding Fair 2018 by NEO, June 2018
- Born: March 2, 1998 (age 28)
- Occupations: Actress; model; YouTubers
- Years active: 2012–present
- Agent: Kantana Group (2014–present)
- Notable work: Gossip Girl: Thailand

Caroline Emma "Carissa" Springett (Thai: คารีสา สปริงเก็ตต์, born 2 March 1998) is a Thai actress and model. She is best known for portraying Beatriz "Blair" Waranon in Gossip Girl: Thailand (2015).

== Career ==
Springett entered the entertainment industry through modeling, starting her career in 2014 as a contestant in The Face Thailand, where she was eliminated in the 10th round. She later starred in Gossip Girl: Thailand as Beatriz "Blair" Waranon, one of the main characters, for which she was awarded the Female Rising Star award at Daw Mekhla Awards.

== Filmography ==
=== Television ===
Year	Title	Role	Network	Notes	Ref.
2013	Sunrise House	Intu-on	Channel 3		
2014	Dark Heir	Min	Channel 3		
2015	Gossip Girl Thailand	Blair Waranon	Channel 3		
2016	Tayard Asoon	Naanint	Channel 3		
2016	Nang Eye	Saisuda Akkaranurak (Sai)	Channel 3		
2017	Mia Luang	Noodee	Channel 3		
2017	Sai Tarn Hua Jai	Khun Ying Pathawee Jongsawat	Channel 3		
2017	Club Friday The Series 9	Im	GMM 25	episode : Ruk Mak..Mak Ruk	
2018	Ngin Pak Pee	Che	Channel 3	Cameo – (episode 1)	
2018	Love Bipolar	Arin	GMM 25		
2018	Bangkok Ghost Stories	Ploy	Channel 3		
2018	Love at First Hate	Ployphat (Ploy)	ONE 31		
2019	Hoh Family	Truffle	Workpoint TV		
2019	Reun Manut	Kiaw	Channel 7		
2019	Pa Pluk Rak	Rom Mai	Channel 5		
2019	Club Friday The Series Season 11	Jib	GMM 25	episode: Ruk Mai Roo Job	
2019	The Series Rak Luang Lorn	Due	Channel 8	episode: Lark Lorn	
2020	Saneha Stories SS3	Goy	AIS Play		
2020	Turn Left Turn Right	Khim	GMM 25	Cameo	
2020	My Bubble Tea	Ray	VIU		
2020	Faii Gam Prae	Au-Tong	GMM 25		
2021	Luang Kah Lah Ruk	Tha-Le	PPTV 36		
2022	Jung Wa Hua Jai Nai Sa Ard	Chanalatree Prompongwong (Hom)	PPTV 36		
2022	Lay Luntaya	Yongtaya / Leleya	Channel 8		

=== Film ===
Year	Title	Role	Ref.
2017	YouAndMeXXX	Eve	

== Hosting ==
- 2021 : EP.1 (อย่างเป็นทางการ) On Air YouTube:Carissa Springett

== Accolades ==
Year	Award	Category	Nominated work	Result	Ref.
2016	4th Daw Mekhla Awards	Female Rising Star	Gossip Girl Thailand	Won	
2018	Press Awards	Best VJ (Female)	JOOX	Won	
