= Naravadee =

Thai writer (born 1931)

Pensri Kiengsiri (born 1931) is a Thai writer who writes under the pen name Naravadee. Her name also appears as Narāwadī.

She was born in Narathiwat Province and studied physiotherapy at the Royal Melbourne Hospital and Melbourne University. While working as a physiotherapist, she also began writing. She has published over thirty novels, several collections of short stories and a book of poetry in English Poems from Thailand. She has been president of the Writers' Association of Thailand.

Her novel Fā Klai Thalē Kwāng (The Sea is Wide, The Sky is Near) received a National Book Award in 1995.
