= Vini Jr. (film) =

2025 documentary film

- Theatrical poster
- Directed by: Emílio Domingos; Andrucha Waddington
- Written by: Emílio Domingos; Sérgio Mekler
- Produced by: Luisa Barbosa; Renata Brandão
- Starring: Vinicius Junior
- Edited by: Itauana Coquet; Sérgio Mekler
- Music by: Patrícia Portaro
- Production company: Conspiração Filmes
- Distributed by: Netflix
- Release date: 15 May 2025 (Brazil)
- Running time: 106 minutes
- Country: Brazil
- Languages: English; Portuguese

Vini Jr. (Portuguese: Baila, Viní), is a 2025 Portuguese-language sports documentary film, directed by Emílio Domingos and Andrucha Waddington. The film portrays the journey of Vinícius Júnior, a Brazilian footballer, from his early years in São Gonçalo to his success as an international star playing for Real Madrid. The documentary was released on Netflix on May 15, 2025.

== Synopsis ==
The documentary provides an inside look at Vinícius Júnior's life, highlighting his skills and impact both on and off the field. It features never-before-seen footage of the footballer and exclusive interviews with him and other players, including Neymar Jr., Jude Bellingham, Toni Kroos, Karim Benzema, and Thibaut Courtois. The film also explores his opposition to racism in football, particularly the racist abuse he has faced while playing in La Liga.

== Production ==
In May 2023, while playing against Valencia CF at Mestalla Stadium, Vinícius Júnior was subjected to racist abuse from crowd. The match was temporarily suspended after he informed the referee about it. The incident led to widespread condemnation by the football authorities and even the governments of Brazil and Spain. Legal action was later taken against those identified as responsible.

In response, Netflix announced the documentary which explores Vinícius Júnior’s career and sheds light on the issue of racism in the sport. The film focuses on the events at Mestalla, featuring responses from fellow players, coaches, and football organizations. The production team conducted interviews with Vinícius Júnior, his teammates, and football analysts to provide a view of the challenges faced by Black athletes in the sport.

== Reception and controversy ==
Upon its release, Vini Jr. was commended for its emotional resonance and compelling narrative. However, the documentary also drew controversy, especially for its depiction of racist incidents involving Valencia CF supporters during a match in May 2023. In response, Valencia CF has reportedly explored legal options, claiming the film presents a misleading account of the events.
