= Peter Corp Dyrendal =

Thai singer and actor (born 1976)

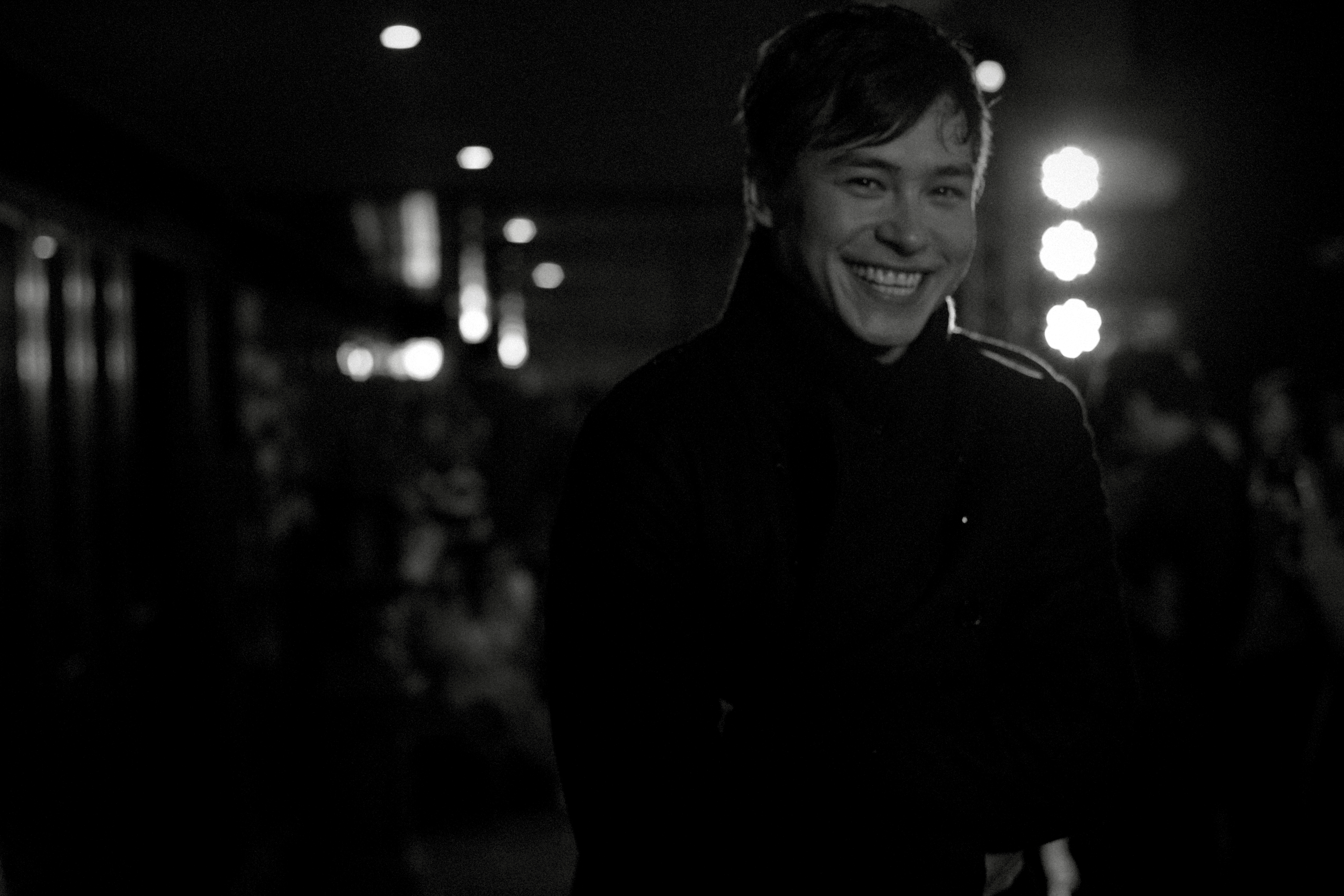
- Dyrendal in 2010
- Born: 1 January 1976 (age 50)
- Occupations: Singer; actor
- Years active: 1997–present

Peter Corp Dyrendal (Thai: ปีเตอร์ คอร์ป ไดเรนดัล; 1 January 1976) is a Thai singer and actor. He has released four studio albums and appeared in numerous television productions as well as several films.

== Discography ==
=== Albums ===
- หินผา กา ดาบ (1997)
- Magic Peter (1999)
- X-Ray (2000)
- Version 4.0 (2002)

=== Compilations ===
- Romantic Peter (2003)
- Best of Peter Corp Dyrendal (2012)
- The Masterpiece (2018)

== Selected filmography ==
=== Film ===
List of film appearances, with year, title, and role shown
Year	Thai title	Title	Role
2011	30 กำลังแจ๋ว	Fabulous 30	Nob
2015	ละติจูดที่ 6	Latitude 6	Ton
2024	Taklee Genesis	Taklee Genesis X Worlds Collide	Itti

=== Television ===
List of television appearances, with year, title, and role shown
Year	Thai title	Title	Role	Notes
2015	แอบรักออนไลน์	Ab Ruk Online	Lipda	15 episodes
2018	ลิขิตรัก	The Crown Princess	Haedeth Ment	1 episode
2019	แรงเงา 2	Raeng Ngao 2	Sarut	10 episodes
2020	เพลิงนาง	Plerng Nang	Longchart	24 episodes
2021	ดวงใจในมนตรา	Duang Jai Nai Montra	Praipol Kamolwichian (Pol)	16 episodes
2021	กระเช้าสีดา	Krachao Seeda	Lue	16 episodes
2022	ตะลุมรัก ตะลุมบอล	My Coach	Joed	16 episodes
2022	รักสุดท้ายยัยจอมเหวี่ยง	My Queen	Non	14 episodes
2024	เด็กฝึกหน้าใส เติมหัวใจนายหญิง	Intern in My Heart	Tul	10 episodes
2025	คลับฟรายเดย์เดอะซีรีส์	Club Friday 17: The Theory of Love	Dom	4 episodes
