= The Book of Sijjin and Illiyyin =

2025 Indonesian film by Hadrah Daeng Ratu

- Poster
- Indonesian: Kitab Sijjin dan Illiyyin
- Directed by: Hadrah Daeng Ratu
- Written by: Lele Laila; Ersan Özer
- Produced by: Gope T. Samtani
- Starring: Yunita Siregar; Dinda Kanyadewi; Tarra Budiman; Djenar Maesa Ayu
- Cinematography: Hani Pradigya
- Edited by: Wawan I. Wibowo
- Music by: Andre Harihandoyo; Rahadian Winursito
- Production companies: Rapi Films; Sky Media; Rhaya Flicks
- Distributed by: Rapi Films
- Release date: 17 July 2025 (Indonesia)
- Running time: 99 minutes
- Country: Indonesia
- Language: Indonesian

The Book of Sijjin And Illiyyin (Indonesian: Kitab Sijjin dan Illiyyin) is a 2025 Indonesian horror thriller film directed by Hadrah Daeng Ratu, and written by Lele Laila and Ersan Özer. It is the sequel of Sijjin (2023). The film stars Yunita Siregar, Dinda Kanyadewi, Djenar Maesa Ayu, Tarra Budiman and Kawai Labiba.

== Plot ==
Losing her home, the death of her parents, being accused of having an affair and being treated like a maid for decades by Ambar's family changed the life of the sincere and kind Yuli into a person full of vengeance. Yuli asks for help from a shaman to cast a black magic on Ambar's family. This family consists of Laras, Ambar's hot-tempered and bossy daughter; Rudi, Laras' husband who always ignores Yuli's suffering; Dean the youngest grandson who likes to tease Yuli; and Tika who is actually kind and religious but can't do anything to help Yuli. However, the black magic suggested by the shaman turns out to be very deadly. This black magic requires Yuli to perform a ritual of inserting the names of the black magic targets into a fresh corpse that has just died. Yuli must also complete the ritual within one week. If the ritual fails to complete, Yuli will suffer terrible consequences.

== Cast ==
- Yunita Siregar as Yuli
  - Firzanah Alya as Young Yuli
- Dinda Kanyadewi as Laras
  - Mazella Gusti as Young Laras
- Tarra Budiman as Rudi
- Djenar Maesa Ayu as Ambar
- Kawai Labiba as Tika
- Sultan Hamonangan as Dean
- Septian Dwi Cahyo as Pana
- David Chalik as Abuyya
- Eduward Manalu as Satya
- Nelly Sukma as Yuli's Mother
- Banon Gautama as Yono
- Khaira Najla Rayvisha as Tika's Friend
- Hami Midah as Tika's Friend

== Release ==
The Book of Sijjin and Illiyyin was released in Indonesia, on 17 July 2025. By the end of its release, the film surpassed 601,135 admissions. In Malaysia, the movie was released on 25 September 2025, and has received RM 2,5 million ($617,000). In Vietnam, it was released on 7 November 2025, and has grossed $340,844.

== Reception ==
=== Critical response ===
Dennis Harvey of Variety, gave the film a mixed-to-positive review, describing it as an energetic and carefully crafted entry that stands above the average genre standard. While noting that the film somewhat lacks deep conviction and narrative inspiration, Harvey commended its solid production values and modest storytelling scale.

Elizabeth Kerr of Screen Daily, offered a positive review, calling the film a culturally specific take on the possession genre that breathes new life into familiar tropes. Kerr lauded director Hadrah Daeng Ratu and writer Lele Laila for balancing effective scares, body horror, and gruesome practical effects with a thoughtful exploration of dysfunctional family dynamics and human morality. She also praised the lead performances of Yunita Siregar and Kawai Labiba, as well as Hani Pradigya's atmospheric cinematography.

Rani Asnurida of IDN Times, praised the film for combining traditional black magic tropes with deeply emotional character motivations. The review highlighted how the story uses the concepts of Sijjin and Illiyyin to explore morality, injustice and revenge. Furthermore, Yunita Siregar's lead performance was singled out for successfully portraying the internal struggle and pain of her character, making the narrative engaging beyond its tense horror elements.

A critic of Daily Times of Bangladesh, highlighted as a compelling Indonesian horror story centered on themes of sin, morality, and retribution. The review emphasized how the narrative weaves traditional Islamic theological concepts of Sijjin and Illiyyin into a dark tale of familial trauma and revenge, delivering an engaging blend of cultural folklore and suspense for regional horror audiences.
