= 2025 Fangoria Chainsaw Awards =

Annual US horror film awards ceremony

31st Fangoria Chainsaw Awards
- Release poster
- Presented by: Fangoria
- Announced on: July 9, 2025
- Presented on: October 19, 2025
- Hosted by: Josh Ruben and Barbara Crampton

Highlights
- Most awards: Sinners (4)
- Most nominations: Sinners and The Substance (10)

The 31st Fangoria Chainsaw Awards honored the best horror films that were released between July 2024 and June 2025. The nominees were announced on July 9, 2025. The ceremony was livestreamed on Shudder on October 19, 2025.

Among the nominees, Sinners and The Substance led with ten nominations each. The former received four wins, including Best Wide Release.

== Winners and nominees ==
Winners are listed first and highlighted in bold.

Best Wide Release	Best Limited Release
**Sinners − Directed by Ryan Coogler**; 28 Years Later − Directed by Danny Boyle; Bring Her Back − Directed by Danny and Michael Philippou; Final Destination Bloodlines − Directed by Zach Lipovsky and Adam Stein; Heretic − Directed by Scott Beck and Bryan Woods; Longlegs − Directed by Oz Perkins; Nosferatu − Directed by Robert Eggers; Strange Darling − Directed by JT Mollner; The Substance − Directed by Coralie Fargeat; The Ugly Stepsister − Directed by Emilie Blichfeldt	**Azrael − Directed by E. L. Katz**; Frankie Freako − Directed by Steven Kostanski; Freaky Tales − Directed by Anna Boden and Ryan Fleck; Get Away − Directed by Steffen Haars; Little Bites − Directed by Spider One
Best International Movie	Best Streaming Premiere
**Oddity − Directed by Damian McCarthy (Ireland)**; Cuckoo − Directed by Tilman Singer (Germany); Dangerous Animals − Directed by Sean Byrne (Australia); Red Rooms − Directed by Pascal Plante (Canada); The Ugly Stepsister − Directed by Emilie Blichfeldt (Norway)	**Mr. Crocket − Directed by Brandon Espy (Hulu)**; Best Wishes to All − Directed by Yûta Shimotsu (Shudder); Cannibal Mukbang − Directed by Aimee Kuge (Prime Video); Gazer − Directed by Ryan J. Sloan (Shudder); There's A Zombie Outside − Directed by Michael Varrati (Prime Video)
Best Director	Best First Feature
**Ryan Coogler − Sinners**; Danny Boyle − 28 Years Later; Robert Eggers − Nosferatu; Coralie Fargeat − The Substance; Osgood Perkins − Longlegs	**The Ugly Stepsister − Directed by Emilie Blichfeldt**; Best Wishes to All − Directed by Yûta Shimotsu; Blink Twice − Directed by Zoë Kravitz; Cannibal Mukbang − Directed by Aimee Kuge; Mr. Crocket − Directed by Brandon Espy
Best Lead Performance	Best Supporting Performance
**Demi Moore − The Substance as Elisabeth Sparkle**; Lily-Rose Depp − Nosferatu as Ellen Hutter; Willa Fitzgerald − Strange Darling as The Lady; Sally Hawkins − Bring Her Back as Laura; Michael B. Jordan − Sinners as Elijah "Smoke" Moore / Elias "Stack" Moore; Maika Monroe − Longlegs as Lee Harker; Lea Myren − The Ugly Stepsister as Elvira; Hunter Schafer − Cuckoo as Gretchen; Naomi Scott − Smile 2 as Skye Riley; Sophie Thatcher − Companion as Iris	**Nicolas Cage − Longlegs as Longlegs**; Miles Caton − Sinners as Samuel "Sammie" Moore; Ralph Fiennes − 28 Years Later as Dr. Ian Kelson; Hugh Grant − Heretic as Mr. Reed; David Jonsson − Alien: Romulus as Andy; Wunmi Mosaku − Sinners as Annie; Jack O'Connell − Sinners as Remmick; Margaret Qualley − The Substance as Sue; Bill Skarsgård − Nosferatu as Count Orlok; Dan Stevens − Cuckoo as Herr König
Best Screenplay	Best Score
**Sinners − Ryan Coogler**; Bring Her Back − Bill Hinzman and Danny Philippou; Heretic − Scott Beck and Bryan Woods; Strange Darling − JT Mollner; The Substance − Coralie Fargeat	**Sinners − Ludwig Göransson**; 28 Years Later − Young Fathers; Longlegs − Zilgi; Nosferatu − Robin Carolan; The Substance − Raffertie
Best Make-Up FX	Best Creature FX
**The Substance − Pierre-Olivier Persin and Stéphanie Guillon**; 28 Years Later − John Nolan; Longlegs − Felix Fox, Harlow MacFarlane, and Werner Pretorius; Nosferatu − David White and Traci Loader; Terrifier 3 − Damien Leone	**The Substance − Pierre-Olivier Persin**; Alien: Romulus − Legacy Effects, Studio Gillis, Wētā Workshop; Oddity − Paul McDonnell; Smile 2 − Millennium FX, Morphology, Jeremy Selenfriend, and Studio Gillis; Werewolves − Studio Gillis
Best Costume Design	Best Cinematography
**Nosferatu − Linda Muir**; MaXXXine − Mari-An Ceo; Sinners − Ruth E. Carter; The Substance − Emmanuelle Youchnovski; The Ugly Stepsister − Manon Rasmussen	**Nosferatu − Jarin Blaschke**; 28 Years Later − Anthony Dod Mantle; Longlegs − Andrés Arochi Tinajero; Sinners − Autumn Durald Arkapaw; The Substance − Benjamin Kračun
Best Documentary Feature	Best Video Game
**George A. Romero's Resident Evil − Directed by Brandon Salisbury**; Doc of Chucky − Directed by Thommy Hutson; In Search of Darkness: 1990-1994 − Directed by David A. Weiner; The J-Horror Virus − Directed by Sarah Appleton and Jasper Sharp; Suzzanna: The Queen of Black Magic − Directed by David Gregory	**Silent Hill 2 Remake − Bloober Team**; Death Stranding 2: On the Beach − Kojima Productions; Mouthwashing − Wrong Organ; Slitterhead − Bokeh Game Studio; Sorry We're Closed − À la Mode Games
Best Series	Best Non-Fiction Series or Miniseries
**The Last of Us (HBO)**; The Creep Tapes (Shudder); From (MGM+); Squid Game (Netflix); Yellowjackets (Showtime)	**The Last Drive-in with Joe Bob Briggs (Shudder)**; The Boulet Brothers' Dragula season 6 (Shudder); Horror's Greatest (Shudder); Svengoolie (MeTV)
Best Public Domain Resurrection	Best Kill
**Screamboat − Directed by Steven LaMorte**; Popeye's Revenge − Directed by William Stead; The Mouse Trap − Directed by Jamie Bailey; Popeye the Slayer Man − Directed by Robert Michael Ryan; Shiver Me Timbers − Directed by Paul Stephen Mann; Peter Pan's Neverland Nightmare − Directed by Scott Chambers	**The Shower Kill – Terrifier 3**
Editorial Eye on the Future Award
**Ksusha Genenfeld**; **Curtis RX**

=== Films with multiple nominations and awards ===
Films with multiple nominations
Nominations	Film
10	Sinners
10	The Substance
8	Nosferatu
7	Longlegs
6	28 Years Later
5	The Ugly Stepsister
3	Bring Her Back
3	Cuckoo
3	Heretic
3	Strange Darling
2	Alien: Romulus
2	Best Wishes to All
2	Cannibal Mukbang
2	Mr. Crocket
2	Oddity
2	Smile 2

Films with multiple wins
Awards	Film
4	Sinners
3	The Substance
2	Nosferatu

== Presenters ==
- Shannon Purser — presented Best Supporting Performance
- Ryan Coogler and Sev Ohanian — presented Best First Feature
- Fayna Sanchez and Sarah Nicklin — presented Best Non-Fiction Series or Miniseries
- Adam Cesare — presented Best Documentary Feature
- Bill Moseley and Tiffany Shepis — presented Best Creature FX
- Dee Snider — presented Best Make-Up FX
- Felissa Rose and Peaches Christ — presented Best Costume Design
- Dusty Gannon — presented Best Score
- Alec Gillis and Flying Lotus — presented Best Cinematography
- Reece Feldman — presented Best Video Game
- Del Howison — presented Horror Host Segment
- Joe Bob Briggs — presented Best Public Domain Resurrection
- Biqtch Puddin' and Catherine Corcoran — presented Best Series
- Michael Gingold — introduced Editorial Eye on the Future Award
- Phil Nobile Jr. — presented Editorial Eye on the Future Award
- Julie Benz, Ron Perlman and Busy Phillips — presented Best Screenplay
- Katie Hettenbach — presented Rules and Regulations of the awards
- Jackie Kong — presented Best International Movie
- Tina Romero — presented Best Limited Release
- Chelsea Rebecca and James A. Janisse — presented Best Streaming Premiere
- Gwar — presented Best Kill
- David Howard Thornton — presented Best Lead Performance
- Jeffrey Reddick — presented Best Director
- Ernest Dickerson — presented Best Wide Release
