= Mouseboat Massacre =

- Official release poster
- Directed by: Andrea M. Catinella
- Screenplay by: Harry Boxley
- Produced by: Rene August
- Starring: Kathi DeCouto; Jay Robertson; Natasha Tosini
- Cinematography: Joseph Khalil
- Music by: James Cox
- Production company: ITN Studios
- Distributed by: The Movie Partnership
- Release date: 28 March 2025
- Running time: 83 minutes
- Country: United Kingdom
- Language: English

Mouseboat Massacre is a 2025 British slasher horror film directed by Andrea M. Catinella. It is a reimagining of Walt Disney and Ub Iwerks's 1928 animated short film Steamboat Willie.

Though the Walt Disney Company retains exclusive rights to its own Mickey Mouse universe, the Steamboat Willie version of the iconic character entered the public domain on January 1, 2024. It is, together with The Mouse Trap, Screamboat, I Heart Willie and Mouse of Horrors, one of many Mickey Mouse–themed horror films released after the character entered the public domain. The film was produced by ITN Studios that also produced the Twisted Childhood Universe films, though it does not take place in the same cinematic universe same as Popeye's Revenge and Mouse of Horrors.

== Premise ==
A young woman struggling with drug addiction is haunted by visions of a grotesque mouse-human hybrid, but as the hallucination consumes her life, people around her begin mysteriously dying.

== Cast ==
- Kathi DeCouto as Connie
- Joseph Emms as Nigel Jackson
- Lauren Leppard as Mimi
- Shayli Reagan as Sarah
- Jay Robertson as The Mouse
- Natasha Tosini as Blaire
- Iveta Drulyte as Helen
- Keith Eyles as Stu Jackson
- Atlanta Moreno as Phoenix
- Victor Rios as Simon
- Sam Rowlands as Policeman

== Release ==
Mouseboat Massacre was released on DVD, Blu-ray, and streaming in the United States on March 25, 2025.
