= Works based on a copyright-free Mickey Mouse =

List of works based on public domain Mickey Mouse

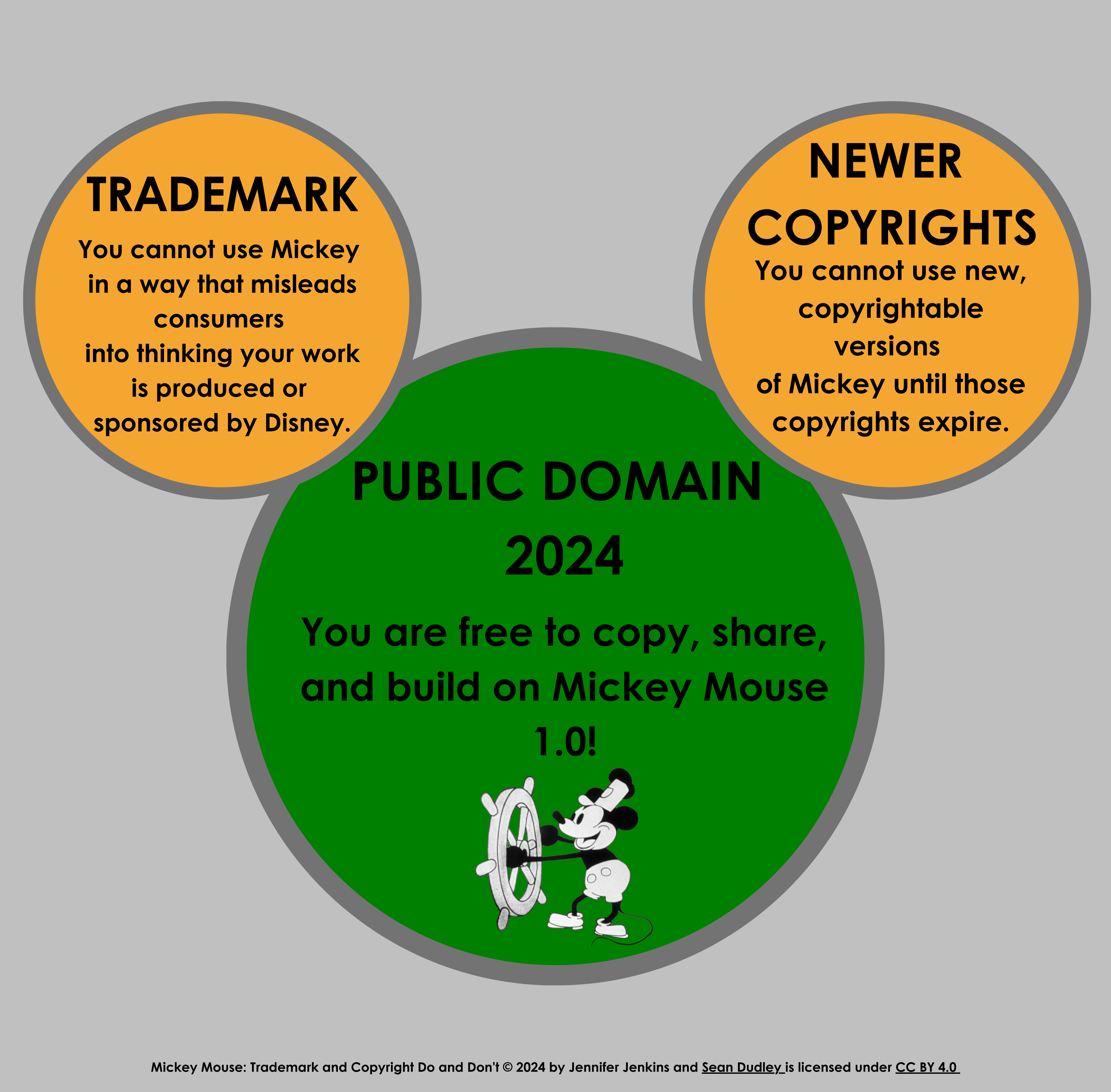
A graph which explains the trademark status of Steamboat Willie in the United States as of 2024.

The following is a list of creative works starring Mickey Mouse announced after Steamboat Willie, Plane Crazy and The Gallopin' Gaucho, released in 1928, entered the public domain in the United States on January 1, 2024. In January, multiple films and video games starring the iconic character were announced immediately. This list only includes works that received substantial media attention.

== List ==
Name	Type of work	Description	Release date
MSCHF X Famous Mouse	Collectibles	Art collective MSCHF created a line of Public Domain Mickey-collectibles. The items could be pre-ordered from August 2021 and became available in 2024.	August 2021 (pre-orders); 2024 (Available)
Inverse Ninjas VS. The Public Domain	Shooter game	Video game in which public domain-characters such as Sherlock Holmes, Alice, Winnie-the-Pooh and the Monkey King have to shoot an endless group of evil ninjas. In January, Mickey Mouse was introduced through an update.	December 5, 2023 (original release); January 1, 2024 (Mickey Mouse update)
Rubber Hose Rampage	Run n' Gun videogame	A run-and-gun videogame reminiscent of Cuphead.	January 24, 2024
The Vanishing of S.S. Willie	Horror short film	Horror short film based on Steamboat Willie and, as so far known, the first film released using its public domain-status.	January 1, 2024
Mousetrapped	Webcomics	An unfinished daily webcomic-series created by R. K. Milholland, continuing the narrative of Mickey, after the events of Steamboat Willie.	From January 1, 2024
Steamboat Willie (Brock's Dub)	Redubbed original cartoon	A redubbed version of Steamboat Willie posted on YouTube. The video received some media notoriety for being the first Steamboat Willie-video to receive and survive a copyright-claim from The Walt Disney Company. On January 6, YouTube revoked the copyright-claim from Disney.	January 4, 2024
"One Eyed Bastard"	Music video	The fourth single of Green Day's fourteenth studio album, Saviors. The music video features Mickey Mouse wearing his Steamboat Willie outfit as well as an eyepatch.	January 5, 2024
The Mouse Trap	Slasher film	Slasher film in which a mass murderer in a Mickey Mouse mask hunts down a group of teenagers inside an amusement arcade.	August 6, 2024
I Hate Fairyland - Happy End Game	Comic book	Story arc of I Hate Fairyland featuring a public domain Mickey Mouse.	October 2024 - February 2025
I Heart Willie	Slasher film		November 8, 2024
Infestation: Origins	Survival horror game	Developed by Nightmare Forge Games, the game was released in early access on November 15, 2024. Upon its initial announcement, IGN compared the game to the 2023 horror film, Winnie-the-Pooh: Blood and Honey, due to a similar situation where Winnie-the-Pooh fell into the public domain. The game was immediately criticized as an asset flip, and for its alleged use of audio deepfakes instead of voice acting. It was criticized for neo-Nazi themes such as the number 88, and the premise of using gas to exterminate rats. In response to the allegations, the developers renamed the game from Infestation '88 to Infestation: Origins.	November 15, 2024
Mouse of Horrors	Slasher film		January 26, 2025
Mouseboat Massacre	Slasher film		March 25, 2025
Screamboat	Slasher film	Slasher film in which Mickey Mouse turns into a mutated creature that starts a murderous rampage on a ferry.	April 2, 2025
The Dark Domain: MVW Mickey-vs-Winnie	Slasher film		TBA
The Return of Steamboat Willie	Horror film	An upcoming animated horror film	TBA
Screamboat 2: Nothing Stays Dead	Horror film		TBA

== See also ==
- Mickey au Camp de Gurs, 1942 comic booklet
- Mickey Mouse in Vietnam, 1969 short film
- Suicidemouse.avi, creepypasta that uses 1928's incarnation of Mickey Mouse
