= Three Blind Mice (disambiguation) =

Three Blind Mice is a children's nursery rhyme and musical round. The title may also refer to:

== Film and television ==
- Three Blind Mice (1938 film), romantic comedy starring Loretta Young, Joel McCrea and David Niven
- Three Blind Mice (2001 film), TV movie starring Brian Dennehy
- Three Blind Mice (2003 film), crime thriller with Edward Furlong
- Three Blind Mice (2008 film), Australian film written and directed by Matthew Newton
- Three Blind Mice (2023 film), a British horror film
- Three Blind Mice, working title of The Final Terror, a 1983 horror film
- Three Blind Mice (Shrek), in the Shrek movie franchise

== Music ==
- Three Blind Mice (album), by Art Blakey & the Jazz Messengers in 1962
- "Three Blind Mice" (instrumental), working title for a studio experiment recorded by Brian Wilson of The Beach Boys
- Three Blind Mice (record label), jazz label in Japan
- Three Blind Mice, a Hot Springs High School jazz band featuring Randy Goodrum and Bill Clinton

== Other ==
- Three Blind Mice (radio play and short story), by Agatha Christie
- Three Blind Mice and Other Stories, a book of short stories by Agatha Christie
- Three Blind Mice: How the TV Networks Lost Their Way, a book by Ken Auletta
- Three Blind Mice, a variant of the patience/solitaire card game Scorpion
