= Amber Doig-Thorne =

British Actress

- Born: October 25; York, England, United Kingdom
- Education: University College London (BSc)
- Occupations: actress; producer
- Years active: 2019–present
- Website: www.amberdoigthorne.com

Amber Doig-Thorne (born 25 October) is an English actress and producer. She has played lead roles in over 30 feature films, including The Seven (2019), Winnie-the-Pooh: Blood and Honey (2023), The Baby in the Basket (2025) and Angel Of The North (2026).

== Early life ==
Amber Doig-Thorne was born in York, England. She spent some of her childhood in Auckland, New Zealand before returning to York. Doig-Thorne attended the Mount School. She graduated with a Bachelor of Science (BSc) Degree in Theoretical Physics from University College London.

== Career ==
Amber Doig-Thorne made her feature film debut in the 2019 The Seven, playing one of the lead roles as Lindsey. In 2022, she starred in Winnie-the-Pooh: Blood and Honey. She played one of the lead roles of Alice. She stated that she had been a fan of the character from an early age. In 2024, Amber stared as Ileana in Never Have I Ever, opposite Andrew Lee Potts. In 2025, Doig-Thorne starred as Sister Agnes, the lead in The Baby in the Basket. sharing scenes with Paul Barber and Maryam D’Abo.

Amber was commissioned by BBC Comedy as a writer and performer for Laugh Lessons, which was broadcast on BBC Three.

== Filmography ==
Year	Title	Role	Notes
2019	The Seven	Lindsey	
2019	Fear Hunters	Jenny	
2020	R.I.A (Override)	Erika Turner	
2021	Run From Hell	Grace	
2021	BBC Laugh Lessons	Amber	
2022	Intervention	Laura/Nell	
2022	Heropanti 2	Julia Bulgaria	
2022	Return of Krampus	Nikki	
2022	Alien Invasion	Norma	
2022	Demons At Dawn	Charlotte Craig	
2022	The Caller	Karmen	
2023	Winnie-the-Pooh: Blood and Honey	Alice	
2024	The Haunted Studio	Catherine Tobin	
2024	Burnt Flowers	Detective Franc Alban	
2024	Hestia	Dr Julia Pike	
2024	Winnie-the-Pooh: Blood and Honey 2	Alice	Archival footage
2025	Mr Hyde: The Untold Story	Rodrigues	
2025	Virus Detected	Amber	
2025	Never Have I Ever	Ileane	
2025	The Baby in the Basket	Sister Agnes	
2026	Ren: The Girl With the Mark	Erin	
2026	Blood Witch	Sharon Devlin	
2026	Bigfoot: Primal Fear	Isabelle	
2026	The Ninth Master	Laura	
2026	Angel Of The North	Leanne	
2026	The Diamond Thief	Maggie	
2026	The Holiday Hitman	The Red Ninja	
