= Cinderella's Curse =

- Theatrical release poster
- Directed by: Louisa Warren
- Written by: Harry Boxley
- Screenplay by: Harry Boxley
- Based on: Cinderella
- Produced by: Scott Chambers (Note: Credited as Scott Jeffrey.); Jerome Corman; Stuart Alson; Nicole Holland; Louisa Warren
- Starring: Kelly Rian Sanson; Chrissie Wunna; Danielle Scott; Natasha Tosini; Peter Watson
- Cinematography: Vince Knight
- Edited by: Jack James
- Music by: James Cox
- Production companies: Champdog Films; Cineacash Productions
- Distributed by: 101 Films
- Release date: 31 May 2024 (United Kingdom)
- Running time: 79 minutes
- Country: United Kingdom
- Language: English
- Box office: 100,490

Cinderella’s Curse is a 2024 British fantasy horror film directed by Louisa Warren. It stars Kelly Rian Sanson as the titular character, Chrissie Wunna as the Fairy Godmother with Danielle Scott, Natasha Tosini and Peter Watson in supporting roles.

== Plot ==
A mysterious supernatural incident involves a man and a woman. The circumstances surrounding the event are connected to a diary, which later becomes significant to the story.

Cinderella, a young woman living with her cruel stepmother and stepsisters, is treated as a servant within the household and is subjected to constant mistreatment and humiliation. Her family members show little concern for her well-being, while Cinderella becomes increasingly resentful of their treatment.

Cinderella eventually receives an opportunity to attend a royal ball. She encounters the Prince at the event, but he is portrayed as arrogant and self-centered rather than as the idealized romantic figure traditionally associated with the Cinderella story. Cinderella's meeting with him does not provide the escape she had hoped for.

Cinderella learns more about the curse connected to her circumstances, and the diary provides clues about the supernatural forces involved.

Cinderella subsequently begins taking revenge against those who have abused and humiliated her. Her actions become increasingly violent as she turns against members of her stepfamily and others associated with her suffering. The familiar elements of the Cinderella fairy tale are consequently transformed into those of a horror story, with the royal ball and Cinderella's relationship with the Prince serving as part of a larger supernatural nightmare.

The Prince and others eventually become targets of Cinderella's revenge. Rather than being rescued by the Prince, Cinderella embraces the supernatural power associated with the curse.

Cinderella's transformation is complete and she has rejected the traditional idea of a "happily ever after" and instead becomes a supernatural figure seeking vengeance.

== Cast ==
- Kelly Rian Sanson as Cinderella
- Chrissie Wunna as the Fairy Godmother
- Lauren Budd as Ingrid, Cinderella's stepsister
- Natasha Tosini as Hannah, Cinderella's stepsister
- Danielle Scott as the Stepmother
- Sam Barrett as Prince Levin
- Frederick Dallaway as Moritz
- Helen Fullerton as Anja
- Charlotte J. Coleman as the Queen
- Peter Watson as the King
- Evyn George as Terrorture
- Ivan Wilkinson as John Bradbury
- Sam Byrne as Jacob
- Sarah T. Cohen as Phil
- Kitty Sudbery as Athena
- Nathan Livingstone as Terrorture
- Jenny Miller as Blair
- Nathan Livingstone as Terrorture
- Jenny Miller as Blair

== Production ==
The project reworks the traditional Cinderella story as a horror film rather than a conventional fairy-tale adaptation. Its premise centers on Cinderella being mistreated by her stepfamily before discovering an ancient book capable of summoning a fairy godmother. She uses the resulting supernatural intervention to seek revenge.

== Reception ==
Joel Harley of Starburst said the film "doesn’t waste time in getting to the meat of the matter – setting Cindy loose on those who wronged her. Warren delivers on the carnage in this respect, including a toe-curling version of the glass slipper scene. Too much of it is hidden behind dingy cinematography, but the gore is effectively done and liberally shared." Kat Hughes of The Hollywood News said "A strong first half is let down by a frazzled second, which drops the story in favour of gore galore. The overwhelming amount of murder and mayhem loses potency and leaves Cinderella’s Curse falling flat without the happy ending it deserves."
