= After School Massacre =

2014 film directed by Jared Masters

- Directed by: Jared Masters
- Written by: Jared Masters
- Produced by: David Petovar; Julia Faye West
- Starring: Nikole Howell; Lindsay Lamb; Andrew Phillips; Courtney Rood; Danika Galindo; Yasmine Soofi; Savannah Matlow
- Cinematography: Tim McCombe
- Edited by: Tim McCombe
- Music by: Sean Gibson; David Petovar
- Release date: January 10, 2014 (Shockfest Film Festival)
- Running time: 73 minutes

After School Massacre (originally titled Teacher's Day) is a 2014 American slasher film written and directed by Jared Masters. The film stars Nikole Howell, Lindsay Lamb, Andrew Phillips, Courtney Rood, Danika Galindo, Yasmine Soofi, and Savannah Matlow. After School Massacre follows the story of a high school teacher who goes on a killing spree after being fired, stalking his former female students at their slumber party for revenge against all those who wronged him.

== Plot ==
Two high school students, Devon (Nikole Howell) and Jess Perkins (Savannah Matlow), have a crush on their teacher Ty Anderson (Bruce Kade), and they convince him to accept their friend requests on Facebook. Later, they report Anderson to Principal Wheatley (Art Roberts), saying that he made sexual comments to them on Facebook. Wheatley promptly fires Anderson, who snaps and kills Wheatley and his secretary Linda (Mindy Robinson) in furious response; he then overhears the girls discussing how they are going to a slumber party, so he decides to go there to take revenge on them for setting him up. Devon meets Jess and her older sister Dee Dee (Simone Wasserman) at the party, along with their other friends Erin (Courtney Rood), Alex (Yasmine Soofi), Steph (Danika Galindo), and Laura (Lindsay Lamb). Nerds Max (Lonnie Alcide Gardner) and Joel (Nick Sinise) also arrive to spy on the girls.

Dee Dee has an argument with her boyfriend, Luke Dalton (Andrew Phillips), and goes to buy more beer. She is ambushed by Anderson, who impales her with a mailbox before killing another girl named Shelly (Kristyn Archibald). Meanwhile, Luke tries to date-rape Erin in Jess' bedroom. After confronting Luke, Jess and her friends then discover Max and Joel and chase them away from the house before engaging in various party games. Anderson strangles a pizza delivery boy (Paul Tirado) when he arrives and hides his body in a trash barrel. When Max and Joel return, Joel passes out drunk in the garage while Anderson stabs Max in the throat with shears. Luke attempts to cheat on Dee Dee with Alex in Jess' parents' bedroom, but Anderson beats her to death with a radio after Luke leaves to mix drinks. Erin is drowned in a plastic tub while bobbing for apples, and Steph is hanged with a power cable in the garage.

Laura discovers Alex's body stuffed up the chimney before Anderson cuts her throat with an electric knife. He then reveals himself as the killer to Jess before knocking her out and killing Devon by shoving a curling iron down her throat. Luke discovers what Anderson has done and attacks him but is stabbed to death with a poker. Anderson leaves his mask in Luke's lifeless hand and flees the scene, framing him. The police arrive and assume Luke was the killer. Jess recovers and runs down the street and attempts to flag down a passing car, getting run over in the process, but manages to survive.

== Cast ==
- Nikole Howell as Devon
- Andrew Phillips as Luke Dalton
- Courtney Rood as Erin
- Lindsay Lamb as Laura
- Yasmine Soofi as Alex
- Danika Galindo as Steph
- Savannah Matlow as Jess Perkins (as Savvy Matlow)
- Simone Wasserman as Dee Dee Perkins
- Lonnie Alcide Gardner as Max (as Lonnie Gardner)
- Nick Siniseas as Joel
- Dawna Lee Heising as Karla Perkins
- Steve Crestas as Officer Harris
- Julia Faye West as Anny Briteheart
- Kelly De Vries as Kara
- Mindy Robinson as Linda
- Art Roberts as Principal Wheatley
- Kristyn Archibald as Shelly
- LeJon as Steve
- Levi Factora as Deon
- Abby Summers as Erica
- Kamuela Kim as Mr. Lox
- Geena Lovato as Chloe
- Mystic Marlow as Janitor
- Paul Tirado as Pizza Delivery Boy
- Laura Amelia as Ambulance Driver
- Bruce Kade as Paramedic

== Reception ==
Ben French of horrornews.net described it as "exceptionally terrible." Blacktooth of horrorsociety.com praised the acting, but said that it had "no style" and described the film as "a slasher that had everything going for it but the team behind it failed to pull it off."
