= Winnie-the-Pooh: Blood and Honey =

2023 British film by Rhys Frake-Waterfield

- Theatrical release poster
- Directed by: Rhys Frake-Waterfield
- Screenplay by: Rhys Frake-Waterfield
- Based on: Winnie-the-Pooh by: A. A. Milne; E. H. Shepard
- Produced by: Scott Chambers (Note: Credited as Scott Jeffrey.); Rhys Frake-Waterfield
- Starring: Maria Taylor; Craig D. Dowsett; Natasha Rose Mills; Amber Doig-Thorne; Danielle Ronald; Natasha Tosini; Chris Cordell; Nikolai Leon
- Cinematography: Vince Knight
- Edited by: Rhys Frake-Waterfield
- Music by: Andrew Scott Bell
- Production companies: Jagged Edge Productions; ITN Distribution
- Distributed by: Altitude Film Distribution
- Release dates: 26 January 2023 (Mexico); 10 March 2023 (United Kingdom)
- Running time: 84 minutes
- Country: United Kingdom
- Language: English
- Budget: $50,000
- Box office: $7.7 million

Winnie-the-Pooh: Blood and Honey is a 2023 British slasher film produced, directed, written, and edited by Rhys Frake-Waterfield. The first instalment of The Twisted Childhood Universe, it is a horror interpretation of A. A. Milne and E. H. Shepard's Winnie-the-Pooh books and stars Nikolai Leon as Christopher Robin, Craig David Dowsett as the titular character, Chris Cordell as Piglet, and Amber Doig-Thorne and Natasha Rose Mills. It follows Pooh and Piglet, who have become feral murderers, as they terrorise a group of young university women and Christopher Robin when he returns to the Hundred Acre Wood five years after leaving for college.

The independent film was first announced in May 2022, when it drew widespread attention due to its premise involving a character that was a childhood icon, and it was met with divided reactions. It was produced by Jagged Edge Productions in association with ITN Studios and went into development after the 1926 Winnie-the-Pooh book entered the public domain in the United States in January 2022. The film was shot in six days in the Ashdown Forest of East Sussex, England, which served as inspiration for the Hundred Acre Wood in the original books.

Winnie-the-Pooh: Blood and Honey was originally set for a direct-to-video release in October 2022, but a spike in online popularity expanded it at first to an intended nationwide one-night event, before it evolved into a major worldwide theatrical release. It premiered in Mexico on 26 January 2023, and was theatrically released in the United Kingdom on 10 March. The film received overwhelmingly negative reviews from critics with many considering it one of the worst films ever made. It received five Golden Raspberry Awards, including Worst Picture and Worst Screen Combo. However, the film was a box office success, grossing $7.7 million worldwide on a budget of $50,000. A sequel, Winnie-the-Pooh: Blood and Honey 2, was released in 2024, which received higher reviews.

== Plot ==
Years ago, a young boy named Christopher Robin met and befriended a group of anthropomorphic creatures—Owl, Rabbit, Eeyore, Piglet and Winnie-the-Pooh—in the Hundred Acre Wood. Not long after, Christopher had to leave them to attend college; with the coming of winter and its lack of food, the starved creatures decided to eat Eeyore. Traumatised by their actions, the others developed a hatred towards humans, including Christopher Robin (due to his departure), and return to their feral instincts, making a promise to never talk again.

Five years later, Christopher, now an adult, goes back to the Hundred Acre Wood, accompanied by his fiancée Mary, and finds the place deserted. At night, the couple are ambushed by Piglet, who strangles Mary to death with a chain, before he and Pooh drag Christopher into the woods.

Some time later, university students Maria, Jessica, Alice, Zoe, Lara, and Tina rent a cabin in the Hundred Acre Wood, so Maria can move on from a traumatising stalking experience. Tina, lost in the woods, is attacked by Pooh. She hides in a nearby garage, but Pooh finds her and grinds her into a woodchipper. Later, back in his treehouse, Pooh whips Christopher with Eeyore's tail and showers him with Mary's blood.

As night falls, Pooh and Piglet ambush the cabin. Pooh runs Lara's head over with a car before Piglet kills Zoe with a sledgehammer. Maria and Jessica arrive, watching Alice being abducted. They follow Pooh and eventually rescue Alice. Afterwards, the trio break into Pooh's treehouse, freeing Christopher from his chains, and another captive, Charlene. She explains her plan to get revenge on Piglet, who mutilated her face. Charlene summons Piglet, but he mauls her to death after Pooh subdues her. Pooh chases Maria and Jessica into the woods, but Alice stays behind and ambushes Piglet. After Alice knocks Piglet unconscious with his sledgehammer, Pooh arrives and fatally impales her with a knife through her open mouth.

On the road, Maria and Jessica seek help from a group of local men passing by, whom Pooh easily slaughters. Maria attempts to run Pooh over with their pick-up truck but crashes and blacks out. Upon awakening, she witnesses Pooh dragging Jessica away, then decapitating her. Christopher suddenly appears and crushes Pooh between the truck and his car. Pooh barely survives, frees himself, grabs Maria and holds her at knifepoint. Christopher pleads for Pooh to release her, promising to stay with him forever. Pooh, breaking his non-speaking vow, furiously tells Christopher "You left," and slits Maria's throat. Seeing that his former friend is now beyond help, Christopher flees the woods as Pooh repeatedly stabs Maria's corpse in anger.

== Cast ==
- Nikolai Leon as Christopher Robin
  - Frederick Dallaway as young Christopher Robin
- Maria Taylor as Maria
- Natasha Rose Mills as Jessica
- Amber Doig-Thorne as Alice
- Danielle Ronald as Zoe
- Natasha Tosini as Lara
- Paula Coiz as Mary Robin
- May Kelly as Tina
- Danielle Scott as Charlene
- Craig David Dowsett as Winnie-the-Pooh
- Chris Cordell as Piglet
- Marcus Massey as Colt
- Richard D. Myers as Logan
- Simon Ellis as Tucker
- Jase Rivers as John
- Mark Haldor as Darrell
- Toby Wynn-Davies as the narrator

== Production ==
=== Development ===
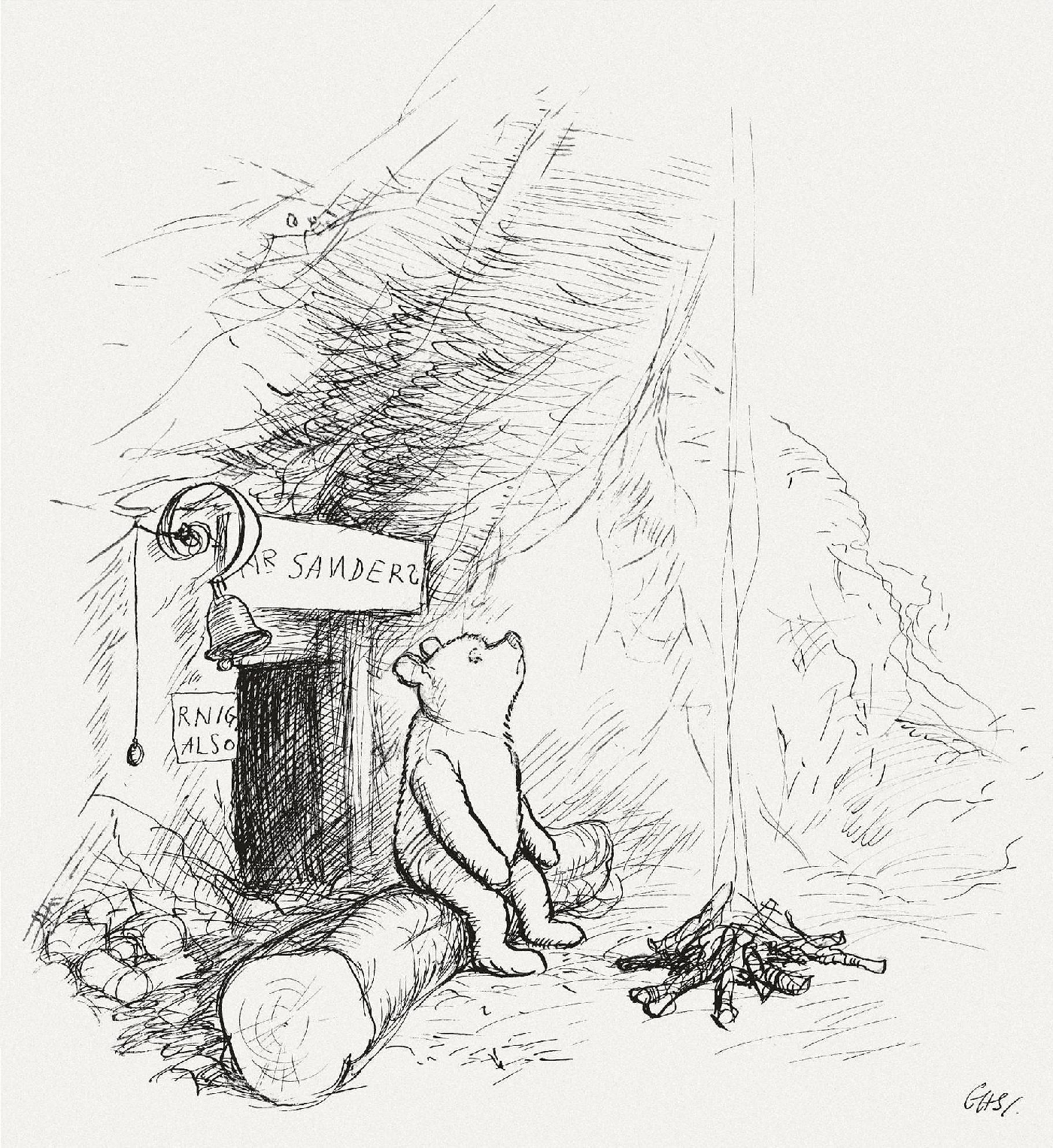
While the illustrations from the original 1926 book went into the U.S. public domain along with its text, Frake-Waterfield had to avoid any elements that were unique to Disney's depictions of the character.

The film's director Rhys Frake-Waterfield discusses the character design process for the film's version of Winnie-the-Pooh.

On 24 May 2022, Josh Korngut of Dread Central reported that a Winnie-the-Pooh-based horror film adaptation was in development. The characters' rights had been owned by The Walt Disney Company since 1966 and, while Disney retains exclusive rights to the depictions of these characters from their own franchise, the first Winnie-the-Pooh book went into the public domain in the U.S. on 1 January 2022. After the US copyright lapsed, Rhys Frake-Waterfield began development on Winnie-the-Pooh: Blood and Honey the same year. Speaking to Variety, Frake-Waterfield described the plot as both Winnie-the-Pooh and Piglet turning into homicidal maniacs after Christopher Robin leaves them for college. He stated:

Christopher Robin is pulled away from them, and he's not [given] them food, it's made Pooh and Piglet's life quite difficult... Because they've had to fend for themselves so much, they've essentially become feral. So they've gone back to their animal roots. They're no longer tame: they're like a vicious bear and pig who want to go around and try and find prey.

Due to budgetary reasons, Frake-Waterfield reimagined the characters as "half-man, half-bear" and "half-man, half-pig". He decided to have Eeyore killed off as the catalyst for Pooh and Piglet's descent into madness as he wasn't sure whether to portray the character onscreen with computer-generated imagery or with two people in a donkey suit. The masks used for Pooh and Piglet in the film were created by the American prosthetic-mask manufacturing company Immortal Masks. Pooh's outfit consisted of a red lumberjack suit purchased online from Amazon and yellow cleaning gloves, and cost £630 ($770) overall. On 16 February 2023, Frake-Waterfield explained in an interview with Yahoo! Entertainment that the first draft of the film was meant to be closer to the original source material. However, The Walt Disney Company still retained the exclusive rights to the depictions of these characters from their own franchise, so Frake-Waterfield had to scrap the original script and rewrote it to avoid any legal trouble. Scott Jeffrey claimed that the first version was much darker than the final film, featuring people chained up and infant versions of Pooh locked in cages. Executive producers rejected the pitch and requested a simple, straightforward narrative, initially focusing on "hot girls in a cabin." While both Frake-Waterfield and Jeffery found it boring, they went through with it regardless as long as it meant they would get money. The producers expressed they struggled finding cast and crew members, as many of their colleagues turned down working on the film. The film had merely been made on a "conveyor belt" of direct-to-video films they were producing, and while Frake-Waterfield believed the film would gain some interest, neither of them thought it would actually go anywhere in terms of success. Jeffery stated that he believed the film would simply receive "a little bit of clickbait, it might get, like, Bloody Disgusting might post it and get a couple of retweets, you know. I thought it might be that."

=== Filming ===
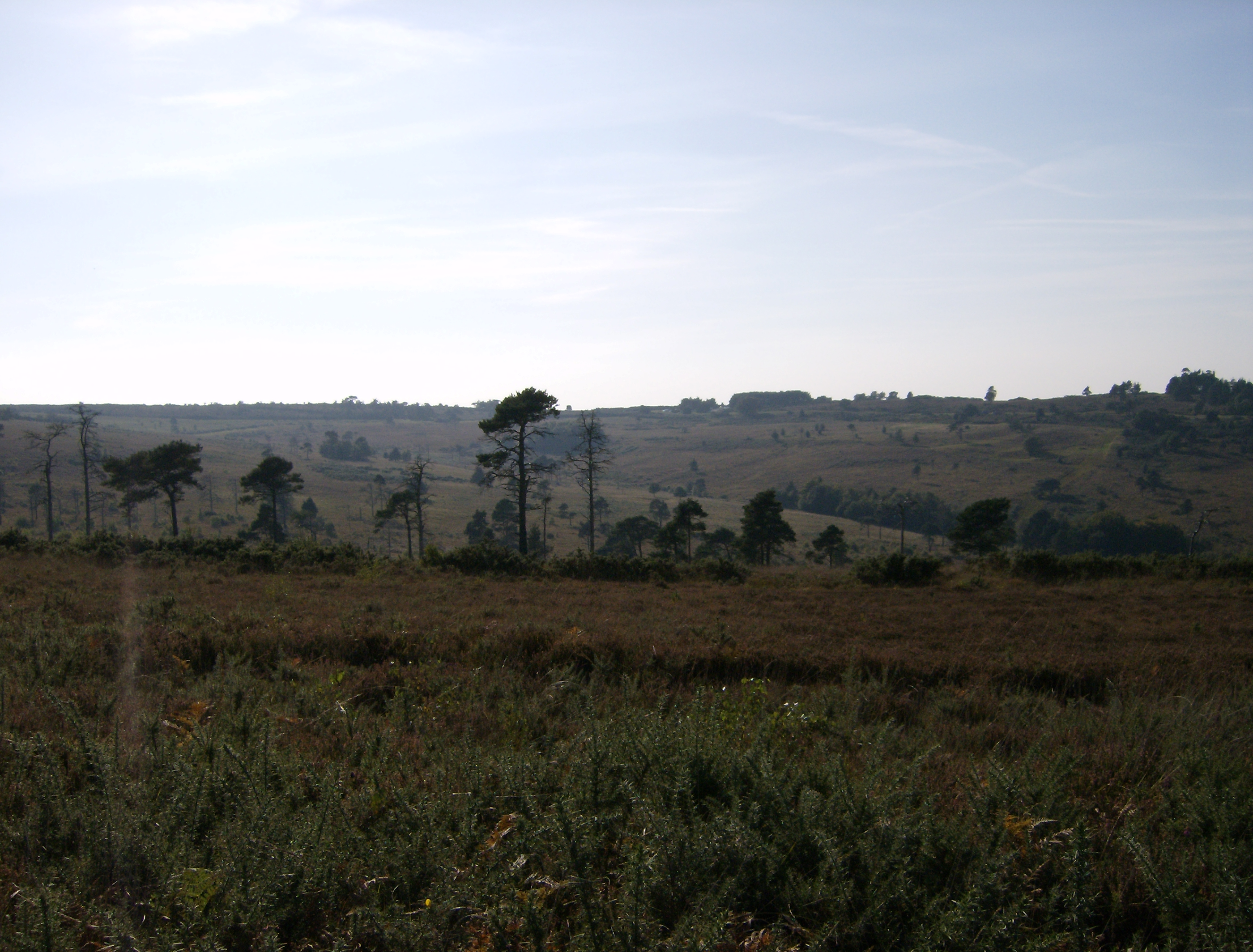
Ashdown Forest, which is known for being the inspiration of the Hundred Acre Wood, the main setting of the Winnie-the-Pooh stories, was used as the filming location for Winnie-the-Pooh: Blood and Honey, where it was shot for six days.

Principal photography for Winnie-the-Pooh: Blood and Honey began in April 2022, with filming taking place in the Ashdown Forest of East Sussex, England over a period of six days on a budget of $20,000. Jagged Edge Productions produced the film in collaboration with ITN Studios. Frake-Waterfield did outfit Pooh with a red shirt, but was careful to avoid other iconic elements from Disney's depictions that could pose a copyright issue. The director reportedly searched through Airbnb for filming locations near Ashdown Forest for Pooh's "lair" and the cabin. The original cut of the film varied differently from the final version; for example, Christopher Robin was killed in the opening scene, and the film ended with Maria successfully escaping, with a closing narration revealing Winnie-the-Pooh was eventually arrested and imprisoned. Additionally, Pooh had way less screen time, only appearing in 20–25 minutes of the film's runtime. Death scenes (such as Lara and Tina’s) originally happened off-camera because around the time they lacked the proper budget for gore effects.

After posting several screenshots of the film on IMDb, Jeffery woke up one night to go to the toilet. As he was unable to go back to sleep afterwards, he began scrolling through Twitter through his phone and discovered multiple articles discussing the film. This caused him to realise that overnight, the film had blown up in popularity on the internet, much to his shock. Cast and crew members have expressed that they were massively surprised by the film's viral hit. Following this, Jeffery tried to convince ITN executives to give them an increased budget to reshoot the entire film. While ITN refused to do so, fearing it would get shut down by The Walt Disney Company, they gave the producers enough money for several "pickup days" nonetheless. Christopher Robin was brought back in the reshoots because of a “really cool idea,” ultimately switching his and Maria’s fates. According to Amber Doig-Throne, the film was reshot at least three times. This resulted in what Jeffery described as a “Frankenstein project” because of the constant patches made to fit the audience’s expectations better, and would lead to the film being the most expensive film Waterfield ever directed and the most expensive film produced by ITN around the time, with a budget of under $50,000.

== Music ==
Winnie-the-Pooh: Blood and Honey (Original Motion Picture Soundtrack)

Soundtrack album by Andrew Scott Bell
- Released: 15 February 2023
- Genre: Horror
- Length: 65:37
- Label: ITN Studios

In July 2022, American composer Andrew Scott Bell was announced as a provider for the score. On 14 July 2022, Bell uploaded a video to YouTube titled "Winnie-the-Pooh: Blood, Honey, and Violins" that documented how he drove from Los Angeles to San Francisco, with his manager Mike Rosen, to collect a honeycomb-filled violin from an experimental luthier to compose the film's soundtrack. In an interview with Dread Central, Bell explained how he got involved with the production of Winnie-the-Pooh: Blood and Honey upon hearing about the film after it went viral upon the announcement. He said:

Back in late May, a day or so before the film went massively viral, I started seeing some online chatter about a Winnie-the-Pooh horror movie. I remember looking it up on IMDb and finding the director Rhys Frake-Waterfield on Instagram where his story had a screenshot of a person's comment saying something to the effect of "your movie is ruining our childhoods". His reaction was, "that's what I'm trying to do, ruin everyone's childhood".

Winnie-the-Pooh: Blood and Honey (Original Motion Picture Soundtrack) is the soundtrack album for the film. Andrew Scott Bell composed the film's score. The soundtrack was released by ITN Studios on 15 February 2023.

All music is composed by Andrew Scott Bell.

No.	Title	Length
1.	"In Which We Are Introduced to Winnie-the-Pooh"	2:07
2.	"In Which Christopher Robin Leads an Expotition"	6:26
3.	"In Which Piglet Meets a Fiancee"	3:05
4.	"Hallo, Pooh Bear"	1:33
5.	"Winnie-the-Pooh: Blood and Honey"	1:18
6.	"Lost in the Wood"	0:58
7.	"Hundred Acre Wood Chipper"	2:36
8.	"Together Forever"	4:04
9.	"Silly Old Bear"	1:58
10.	"In Which Pooh and Piglet Go Hunting"	2:26
11.	"Car Trouble"	1:32
12.	"In Which Pooh Goes Visiting"	3:59
13.	"In Which Piglet Is Entirely Surrounded by Water"	3:00
14.	"In Which Maria and Jess Come to the Forest"	1:32
15.	"A Very Large Jar of Hunny"	2:50
16.	"Rushing Down to the Rescue"	6:00
17.	"Oh, Dear, Oh, Dear, Oh, Dear"	0:59
18.	"In Which Piglet Gets Into a Tight Place"	2:26
19.	"Hundred Acre Hoodlums"	3:25
20.	"In Which Pooh Tries Ridesharing"	3:04
21.	"Pooh Gives Maria a Head Start"	2:24
22.	"In Which Pooh Gives a Party and We Say Goodbye"	4:51
23.	"End-the-Credits"	3:04
24.	"Crece Despacio (Pirekua) feat. Julia Cristina Cruz and Marisol Paz from The Casagrandes Movie: Songs From and Inspired by the Original Motion Picture)"	3:15
25.	"Rym, The Unicorn feat. Dreamy from (Karaoke Night) BFF by Cry Babies / Ends-the-Credits"	2:04
26.	"Real Music feat. Patricio Garzan from (The Casagrandes Movie: Songs From and Inspired by the Original Motion Picture)"	2:35
Total length:		65:37

== Release ==
Winnie-the-Pooh: Blood and Honey was originally planned to be released in October 2022, but the increased publicity and reshoots motivated the change to a 2023 theatrical release. The film premiered in Mexico on 26 January 2023, and was released by Cinemex. It was originally set to be released for a one-night event across cinemas in the United States, United Kingdom and Canada in February 2023, with Fathom Events and Altitude Film Distribution acquiring the rights to release it in their respective countries.

In January 2023, it was announced that the film had been given an expanded theatrical release starting on February 15 in the United States. The film was then released in the United Kingdom on 10 March 2023. For one week, the film was re-released in cinemas in the United States on 17 March 2023. The Hong Kong and Macau release was cancelled due to purported technical glitches, but the film may have been censored due to Internet memes comparing Winnie-the-Pooh to CCP general secretary Xi Jinping; Christopher Robin was banned in China in 2018 for that reason.

=== Marketing ===
After the film's announcement, Salon writer Kelly McClure wrote the film is "a perfect example of the wrong that could come from a creative work slipping into public domain." She continued, calling the film a "horrific take" on Winnie-the-Pooh, also stating "you've got the makings of a dark and twisted cult classic." Jon Mendelsohn, writing for Collider, called the film images "nightmare fuel" and the concept "extremely bizarre" while noting "the internet is freaking out." Rotem Rusak, writing for Nerdist, wrote, "Seeing the iconic bear reimagined as a nightmarish slasher monster speaks to a delightfully imaginative spirit that really inspires us." Justin Carter of Gizmodo wrote:

The appeal of Blood and Honey will depend entirely on if you're willing to meet the movie halfway on its premise, and aren't immediately turned off by the idea of children's characters being turned into murderers or having some dark, edgy backstory. The internet was filled with that sort of thing just a decade or so ago, and this feels like it's very much pulling from that same cloth.

Katarina Feder of Artnet wrote, "...you can't buy publicity like the kind they've had and something tells me that this indie passion project will find its funding, bringing to life the director's unique ideas about murdering women in bikinis."

=== Home media ===
In the United Kingdom, a collector's edition was released on Blu-ray on 5 April 2023. A more basic release came out on 14 April 2023. It got a digital release on Amazon Prime in the United States on 11 April 2023. On 2 June 2023, it got a widespread release across many streaming platforms such as iTunes and Vudu.

== Reception ==
=== Box office ===
Winnie-the-Pooh: Blood and Honey grossed $2 million in the United States and Canada, and $5.6 million in other territories, including over $1 million in Mexico, for a worldwide total of $7.7 million.

=== Critical response ===
Winnie-the-Pooh: Blood and Honey was met with a generally negative reception. On the review aggregator website Rotten Tomatoes, 3% of 64 critics' reviews are positive, with an average rating of 2.2/10. The website's consensus reads: "Oh, bother." Metacritic, which uses a weighted average, assigned the film a score of 16 out of 100, based on 19 critics, indicating "overwhelming dislike".

British film critic Mark Kermode on his podcast with Simon Mayo was massively disappointed with the film saying it has good sound design however further stating "Once the live-action starts, it is just a conveyor belt of lust, greed, avarice, vice... standard slasher tropes. The disappointment is that it takes a really brilliant title and an interesting idea, and then does the most boring, mundane, repetitive thing with it". Christian Zilko of IndieWire scored the film a grade of C+, panning the film's screenplay, but felt that the film "punches above its weight" in the craftsmanship of its kills. Luke Thompson of The A.V. Club criticised the cheap production values and lack of a coherent story, while also noting that the film fulfils its promise of a slasher film based on a beloved children's book. Polygon's Tasha Robinson felt that certain elements such as the gore and inherent grotesqueness of the material worked well, but added that the film's poor dialogue, lack of humour, and connection to its basic source material ruined an interesting premise.

Dennis Harvey of Variety was highly critical of the film for its lack of humour, poor acting, and incoherent screenplay, summarising that the film "fail[ed] to meet even the most basic expectations set up by its conceptual gimmick". Michael Gingold for Rue Morgue felt that the film lacked any sort of wit or imagination to successfully implement upon its premise; Gingold additionally pointed out the "drab" cinematography, absence of characterisation for its title villain, and messy production only served to make the film easily forgettable. Rating the film 1.5 out of 4 stars, Nick Allen from RogerEbert.com wrote that it failed as both a comedy and a horror film, noting the poorly lit scenes in the film made it hard to decipher what was happening on screen, while echoing other critics' sentiments on the writing and lack of interesting characters.

=== Accolades ===
Award / film festival	Date of ceremony	Category	Recipient(s)	Result	Ref.
Golden Raspberry Awards	March 9, 2024	Worst Picture	Scott Chambers and Rhys Frake-Waterfield	Won	
Golden Raspberry Awards	March 9, 2024	Worst Director	Rhys Frake-Waterfield	Won	
Golden Raspberry Awards	March 9, 2024	Worst Screenplay	Rhys Frake-Waterfield	Won	
Golden Raspberry Awards	March 9, 2024	Worst Screen Couple	Pooh & Piglet as Blood-Thirsty Slasher/Killers(!)	Won	
Golden Raspberry Awards	March 9, 2024	Worst Prequel, Remake, Rip-off or Sequel	Winnie-the-Pooh: Blood and Honey	Won	

== Future ==
=== Sequel and prequel ===
In June 2022, Frake-Waterfield expressed interest in creating a sequel, and stated that he wants to "ramp it up even more and go even crazier and go even more extreme". In November 2022, he announced that a sequel, currently titled Winnie-the-Pooh: Blood and Honey 2, was in development with him returning as director and writer, on a budget "five times" larger than the previous instalment. The sequel began filming in late 2023, with an anticipated release date of February 2024. In August 2023, Frake-Waterfield announced that Pooh will use a chainsaw as a weapon in the sequel. That September, Pooh, and Piglet were confirmed to have new designs in teaser images, with the new characters Owl and Tigger also confirmed to appear. Actors Scott Chambers, Ryan Oliva and Eddy McKenzie replaced Nikolai Leon, Craig-David Dowsett and Chris Cordell as Christopher Robin, Pooh and Piglet, respectively. The film was theatrically released on 26 March 2024 to a mixed critical response, although critics described it as an improvement over its predecessor.

In March 2024, two days after the release of Blood and Honey 2, it was announced that a third film was in development. By August 2025, it was reported that Chambers would direct the film, from a screenplay by Richard Stanley. Principal photography began in April 2026 and wrapped in May later that same year. Similarly, Pooh and Tigger were confirmed to have new designs in teaser images, with the new character Rabbit confirmed to appear, alongside the Heffalumps and the Woozles (the latter in the form of Balthazar von Woozle, portrayed by Stanley). Chambers and Lewis Santer will reprise their roles as Christopher Robin and Tigger, respectively, while George Montauge will replace Ryan Oliva as Pooh. In July 2026, it was revealed by Chambers that the movie would serve as a prequel to the second film, and set sometime after the first movie’s prologue; while also explaining that the movie provides additional backstory for various characters while leading directly into the next movie. By October, the film’s full title was revealed; Winnie-the-Pooh: Blood and Honey 3 – The Lost Years is currently slated for a January 2027 release.

=== Shared universe and other projects ===
Alongside the announcement of a sequel, two other horror films were announced: Bambi: The Reckoning, based on Bambi, a Life in the Woods, and Peter Pan's Neverland Nightmare, based on Peter and Wendy. In February 2023, Frake-Waterfield announced that the various projects take place in the same shared continuity franchise, while Jagged Edge Productions intends to eventually have the characters feature in crossover events. In January 2024, it was revealed that The Adventures of Pinocchio would also be adapted into a horror film that is set within the same continuity, titled Pinocchio: Unstrung. Other characters that will expand the universe and future projects were displayed through drawings during the end credits of Winnie-the-Pooh: Blood and Honey 2. In March 2024, the series' first crossover film titled Poohniverse: Monsters Assemble was revealed, with Scott Chambers confirmed to be reprising his role as Christopher Robin, as well as Megan Placito returning as Wendy Darling from Peter Pan’s Neverland Nighmare and Roxanne McKee as Xana from Bambi: The Reckoning, along with brand new characters such as Rabbit, Sleeping Beauty, the Mad Hatter, Cheshire Cat, Mary Poppins and Tintin.

Frake-Waterfield in speculation also expressed interest in making films about Thor, as well as copyrighted franchises such as Teletubbies, Teenage Mutant Ninja Turtles and The Powerpuff Girls.

== See also ==
- The Mouse Trap, an unrelated but similar horror film whose original character went into the public domain in the United States
- List of 21st century films considered the worst
