= Natasha Tosini =

British Actress and Producer

- Born: 15 January 1999 (age 27); Nottingham, England
- Occupations: model; personality; actress
- Years active: 2021–present
- Children: 1

Natasha Tosini (born 15 January 1999) is an actress, producer, director and model.

== Life ==
Natasha Tosini was born on January 15, 1999 and grew up in the St Ann's area of Nottingham.

Tosini has one child, a daughter (born 2020).

== Career ==
Tosini appeared in several music videos. She was in Winnie-the-Pooh: Blood and Honey, a raver in its 2024 sequel, and had a small cameo in Peter Pan's Neverland Nightmare as a circus performer.

== Filmography ==
=== Film ===
Year	Title	Role	Notes
2023	Winnie-the-Pooh: Blood and Honey	Lara	
2023	Three Blind Mice	Cassie	
2024	Love Bites	Lux	
2024	Winnie-the-Pooh: Blood and Honey 2	Spiderweb Girl Raver	
2024	Cinderella's Curse	Hannah	
2025	Peter Pan's Neverland Nightmare	Circus Performer	
2025	Mouse of Horrors	Chloe	
2025	Mouseboat Massacre	Blair	
2025	Fairest of Them All	Belle	
2025	Hook	Salt	
2025	The Haunting at Jack the Ripper's House		
2025	Husky Christmas	—N/a	Producer
2025	Black Krampus	—N/a	Producer

=== Television ===
Year	Title	Role	Notes
2022	Quarantine Leap	Self	1 episode
2025	Horror Hangout	Self	1 episode
