= The Basement (film) =

- Promotional poster
- Directed by: Brian M. Conley; Nathan Ives
- Written by: Brian M. Conley; Nathan Ives; Sean Decker
- Produced by: Brian M. Conley; Nathan Ives; Sean Decker; Mark Heidelberger
- Starring: Mischa Barton; Jackson Davis; Cayleb Long; Tracie Thoms; Sarah Nicklin
- Cinematography: Kenneth Stipe
- Edited by: Brady Hallongren
- Music by: Aaron J. Goldstein
- Distributed by: Uncork'd Entertainment
- Release dates: October 7, 2017 (Shriekfest); September 15, 2018 (United States)
- Country: United States
- Language: English

The Basement is a 2017 American horror film directed by Brian M. Conley and Nathan Ives. The film stars Mischa Barton, Jackson Davis, Cayleb Long, Tracie Thoms, and Sarah Nicklin. The film premiered at Shriekfest in Los Angeles on October 7, 2017. It received a 10 market theatrical and digital release in the United States on 15 September 2018.

== Plot ==
A deranged serial killer known as Bill Anderson (or "The Gemini") tortures and slays his victims in the basement of his San Fernando Valley home.

Craig Owen (Long), a famous guitarist, goes to the convenience store when his wife, Kelly, asks him to get more champagne. While out, Craig receives two seductive text messages from a woman named Bianca, which he promptly deletes. He was kidnapped in the parking lot. Bill tortures him throughout the night by cutting off his fingers, knocking out his teeth (and forcing Craig to chew and swallow them at one point), and pretending to be various characters in a bizarre drama, including a clown, a police officer, a detective, a prisoner, a doctor, a lawyer, a father, a mother, and a prison guard. The mother gives Craig a nail file, which he uses to cut through his restraints while Gemini eats upstairs. Craig frees himself and escapes the basement, only to be recaptured. He wakes up to Bill dressed as a priest, who makes him confess and take communion before carving the Gemini zodiac symbol into Craig's forehead. Bill returns dressed as an executioner and waits for 6:00 AM. Eventually, he decapitates Craig with a blowtorch.

Meanwhile, Craig's wife Kelly invites her best friend Bianca over to discuss where Craig might be. Kelly reveals to Bianca that Craig is having an affair and wants to kill whoever it could be. Bianca stays the night and falls asleep on the sofa after Kelly drugs her.

In the morning, Bill arrives at the house dressed as a police officer. He assures her that he killed Craig. Kelly points to Bianca and tells Gemini to 'take out the trash'.

In the last few minutes, a flashback set one month earlier reveals that Bill and Kelly are twins, and she knows all about his killing spree. She also knows that Craig is having an affair with Bianca and asks Bill to kill Craig.

== Cast ==
- Mischa Barton as Kelly Owen
- Jackson Davis as Bill Anderson
- Cayleb Long as Craig Owen
- Tracie Thoms as Lauren
- Bailey Anne Borders as Bianca
- Kareem J. Grimes as Andre
- Sarah Nicklin as Reporter Amanda Kincaid
- Maria Volk as Allison Perry
- Jessica Sonneborn as Carlee
- Christa Conley as Mia

== Production ==
Conley and Ives wrote the script together in the fall of 2015, and they were inspired by films such as Sleuth, Seven, and The Silence of the Lambs.

== Critical reception ==
On Rotten Tomatoes, the film has an approval rating of 11% based on 9 reviews, with an average score of 3.43/10.

Dread Central gave the film 5 stars out of 5, remarking on its "solid script" and praising the "stellar lead performances" of Davis and Long. The website was also complimentary about the film's production values: "DP Kenneth Stipe has done a lot of TV, but here his lighting and composition are truly cinematic. The music is from another hardworking television veteran, Aaron J. Goldstein, whose sounds underscore the tension and a few moments of comedy quite nicely. When it comes to the grueling and gore – much of it cringe-inducing – kudos go to Julia Hapney and her team."
