= Danielle Ronald =

English actress (born 1991)

- Born: November 10, 1991 (age 35); Halifax, West Yorkshire, England
- Education: Kirklees College (2011-2013)
- Occupations: Actress, makeup designer
- Years active: 2013-present

Danielle Ronald (born November 10, 1991) is an English actress and makeup designer. She is known for her roles in the films Winnie-the-Pooh: Blood and Honey (2023) and Popeye's Revenge.

== Early life ==
Danielle Ronald was born on November 10, 1991 in the Halifax, West Yorkshire and grew up in the suburb of Boothtown. Ronald attended Lightcliffe School. She was a ballet dancer in her youth.

She studied Art at Kirklees College and began a degree in Fashion Design at Liverpool John Moores University. She decided to pursue acting, returning to Kirkless College to complete a BTEC in Performing Arts.

== Career ==
Ronald's first acting role was in the 2013 film, Faust’s Growth. She returned to acting with the 2021 Jagged Edge Production films, The Legend of Jack and Jill, and, Leprechaun’s Revenge.

In 2022 Winnie-the-Pooh went under public domain and a film titled Winnie-the-Pooh: Blood and Honey was announced, receiving a wave of major popularity. Ronald received attention for her role as Zoe in the 2023 horror film Winnie-the-Pooh: Blood and Honey to which she stated the cast and crew received death threats. Ronald appeared in archival footage as Zoe in Winnie-the-Pooh: Blood and Honey 2. Ronald was also apart of the backlash in October 2024 when a teacher showed the film to students.

She had a role of Squealer in the 2023 horror film, Three Blind Mice, which is based off the English nursery rhyme of the same name. In 2025 she played the role of Donna in the film Popeye's Revenge. In 2027 she will appear in the upcoming Winnie-the-Pooh: Blood and Honey 3 – The Lost Years as Faith.

== Personal Life ==
Ronald resides in Knutsford, Cheshire, England.

== Filmography ==
Year	Title	Role	Notes
2013	Faust’s Growth	News Reporter	Film debut
2021	The Legend of Jack and Jill	Carla	
2021	Leprechaun's Rage	Jane	
2023	Winnie-the-Pooh: Blood and Honey	Zoe	
2023	Three Blind Mice	Squealer	
2024	Winnie-the-Pooh: Blood and Honey 2	Zoe	archival footage
2025	Popeye's Revenge	Donna	
2027	Winnie-the-Pooh: Blood and Honey 3 – The Lost Years	Faith	
