= The Baby in the Basket =

- Official release poster
- Directed by: Andy Crane; Nathan Shepka
- Written by: Tom Jolliffe
- Story by: Nathan Shepka
- Produced by: Gary Collinson; Tom Jolliffe; Nathan Shepka
- Starring: Amber Doig-Thorne; Michaela Longden; Elle O'Hara; Paul Barber; Lisa Riesner; Nathan Shepka; Maryam d'Abo
- Edited by: Nathan Shepka
- Music by: Christopher Belsey
- Production companies: Flickering Myth; Jolliffe Productions; Shepka Productions
- Distributed by: High Fliers Films; Alarm Pictures; Axinite Digicinema
- Release dates: February 5, 2025 (Philippines); February 17, 2025
- Running time: 100 minutes
- Country: United Kingdom
- Language: English

The Baby in the Basket is a 2025 British gothic war horror film written by Tom Jolliffe and co-directed by Andy Crane and Nathan Shepka. It stars Amber Doig-Thorne, Michaela Longden, Elle O'Hara, Lisa Riesner, Nathan Shepka, Annabelle Lanyon, Paul Barber and Maryam d'Abo.

== Plot ==
In 1944, during World War II, in a remote Scottish island, home to St. Augustine's Monastery, a secluded convent inhabited by a small group of nuns. The sisters lead a quiet, austere life, isolated from the turmoil of the outside world. As an ominous storm approaches, the nuns brace themselves for days of confinement and introspection.

One stormy night, a mysterious cloaked figure leaves a wicker basket at the convent's doorstep. Inside lies an infant boy, swaddled in cloth, with no note or indication of his origin. The nuns, led by the compassionate Mother Superior, decide to care for the child until the storm subsides, intending to transfer him to the mainland thereafter.

Shortly after the baby's arrival, peculiar occurrences begin to unsettle the convent's tranquility. Sister Agnes, known for her devoutness and sensitivity, experiences disturbing visions and hears disembodied whispers echoing through the stone corridors. She becomes convinced that the child is not an innocent infant but the spawn of Satan himself.

Her claims are met with skepticism by the other sisters, who attribute her behavior to the stress of isolation and the storm's oppressive atmosphere. To prevent further hysteria, Mother Superior orders Sister Agnes to be confined to her quarters.

Inexplicable accidents occur, sacred objects are desecrated, eerie chants resonate from empty chambers, and some nuns fall into trances or exhibit violent behavior. Sister Eleanor, initially a voice of reason, begins to question the nature of the child and the validity of Sister Agnes's warnings.

The nuns' unity fractures as fear and paranoia take hold. Sister Valerie becomes increasingly erratic, claiming to see the baby's eyes glowing in the dark. An injured bird is found mutilated in the chapel, a grim omen that deepens the sisters' dread.

Determined to uncover the truth, Sister Eleanor secretly visits the confined Sister Agnes, who reveals that the baby communicates with her through visions, urging her to commit unholy acts. She believes the child is orchestrating the chaos, feeding off the nuns' fears and sins.

As the convent descends into madness, Sister Agnes escapes her confinement, intent on confronting the evil she perceives. A confrontation ensues in the chapel, where the baby, now exhibiting otherworldly abilities, reveals a demonic visage. The nuns must confront their deepest fears and question their faith to combat the malevolent force threatening to consume them.

With the storm dissipating and the convent in ruins. Survivors are left to grapple with the trauma and the possibility that evil had indeed infiltrated their sanctuary.

== Cast ==
- Amber Doig-Thorne as Agnes
- Michaela Longden as Eleanor
- Elle O'Hara as Valerie
- Paul Barber as Amos
- Lisa Riesner as Lucy
- Nathan Shepka as Daniel
- Maryam d'Abo as Mother Superior
- Annabelle Lanyon as Annalise
- David Rogerson as German Soldier
- Tim Spriggs as Satan (Voice)
- Mac Milloy as Peter
- Scott Brand
- Sergey Kochergan

== Production ==
In March 2023, Flickering Myth announced that it was teaming up with Shepka Productions to produce a horror film, written by Tom Jolliffe and directed by Nathan Shepka. The filming took place in the autumn of 2023.

== Release ==
The film was theatrically released in the Philippines on February 5, 2025, and was released in the United States and the United Kingdom on DVD and Digital on February 17, 2025. It was subsequently acquired by Shudder and AMC+ and added to those platforms in July 2026.

== Reception ==
Leslie Felperin of The Guardian called the film "low-budget nun fun" and wrote;

This cheap-as-chips British horror concerning demented nuns is risible in the extreme, but there’s something about its willingness to commit to the bit that’s sort of admirable.

Sean Cockwell of My Bloody Reviews gave the film a score of 7 out of 10 and wrote;

As always, there were going to be movies to review where the film’s poster art was often of far greater quality than the product it (mis)represented... but on this occasion, I was wrong to think so.

Brian Fanelli of Horrorbuzz.com gave the film a score of 7 out of 10 and said;

The Gothic tones serve the film well, establishing an eerie atmosphere that turns volatile once the baby mysteriously arrives. There are some strong performances here, too, especially from Doig-Thorne and Longden. Keep this film on your radar.
