= The Vanishing of S.S. Willie =

2024 horror short film

- Poster
- Directed by: Nick Lives
- Written by: Nick Lives
- Based on: Steamboat Willie by Walt Disney and Ub Iwerks
- Production company: Night Signal Entertainment
- Release date: January 1, 2024
- Running time: 10 minutes
- Country: United States
- Language: English

The Vanishing of S.S. Willie is a 2024 short horror film written and directed by Nick Lives. It uses the American public domain status of the short animated film Steamboat Willie, featuring the earliest version of Mickey Mouse.

The film was released via YouTube on January 1, 2024 and is credited as the first released film to have been derived from Steamboat Willie since the cartoon entered the public domain.

== Plot ==
Presented as a presumed lost documentary from 1928, the film focuses on the alleged disappearance of the commercial steamship The S.S. Willie in 1909. The story is introduced with the claim that a studio fire destroyed all known film prints before the premiere, relegating it to lost history. They impart a found footage-like atmosphere to the work.

The film itself depicts a series of evidence and backstory discovered by Ben Collin and his crew, who have looked to solve the mystery of what happened to the S.S. Willie and its crew. It starts by revealing the crew aboard the ship: The Captain, the First Mate, two Deckhands, the Chambermaid and the Cabin Boy, all of which go unnamed, and are various animal/human hybrid creatures.

After introducing the crew, Collin shows an interview with an unnamed, and faceless witness who was the last person to see the S.S. Willie and its crew. They talk about how they met the Cabin Boy, and how he claimed that this was to be his final voyage, stating that he was to be married after it was over, and that he would be "making music" with his wife soon.

Next, Collin shows off a series of logs documented by the Captain that were found washed up and water damaged. The logs state that the Captain has been hearing strange music coming from the ship, as well as screaming, and both Deckhands go missing. When the Chambermaid and Cabin Boy also go missing, the Captain begins to seek the nearest port while looking for the missing crew members. The final log entry simply says "I found the music."

After this, Collin has gathered enough info to locate where the S.S. Willie most likely went missing, taking himself and his crew to the location and sending someone to go under the water and take footage of what they could find. The film then displays photographs of what was found at the site. The S.S. Willie was found sunken, and in the wreckage were the skeletal remains of the Captain, First Mate and Deckhands, but the bodies of the latter three were found strangely mutilated to resemble instruments. However, the bodies of the Cabin Boy and Chambermaid were not found.

The documentary concludes with Collin playing a record found at the wreckage titled "Our Music" which plays a distorted version of "Turkey in the Straw", with the sounds of screaming in the background.

== Reception ==
The Vanishing of S.S. Willie received media attention upon its release. ComingSoon.net covered the video for their website, noting that it was "easily one of the more creative uses of Steamboat Willie to emerge so far."

== See also ==
- Works based on a copyright-free Mickey Mouse
