= Adam K =

- Directed by: Joston Theney
- Written by: Joston Theney
- Produced by: Joston Theney
- Starring: Farrah Abraham; Emii; Brinke Stevens; Kristin Wall; Sarah Nicklin
- Edited by: Joston Theney
- Production company: 1. SinningWorks
- Distributed by: Green Apple Entertainment
- Release date: 2017
- Running time: 93 minutes
- Country: United States
- Language: English

Adam K is a 2017 American horror film directed by Joston Theney and starring Farrah Abraham.

== Premise ==
"A day in the life of mild-mannered and seemingly good-natured auto insurance claims manager Adam Kraul. He sets out to be a do-gooder and make friends, however ends up with mutilated victims in his wake when his invitations for friendships are rejected."

== Cast ==
- Farrah Abraham as Karen Simms
- Arielle Brachfeld as Janice Parson
- Emii as Tina
- Brinke Stevens as Mrs. Kraul
- Mindy Robinson as Detective Carli Mansfield
- Kristin Wall as Detective Kelsey Andrews
- Sarah Nicklin as Amanda Cole
- Nihilist Gelo as Detective Harry Grimes
- Edward Gusts as Michael Parson
- Ethan McDowell as Caleb Simms
- Michael Wayne Foster as Bradley Michaels
- John Charles Smith as Detective Maury Bovine
- Jason Bonell as Young Donnie Lee Simms
- Carlos Javier Castillo as Gerry Halloway
- Alan Smithee as Adam Kraul

== Filming ==
Principal photography for the film began in September 2013. Filming was almost shut down in 2014 after reports to the Los Angeles Police Department of "cries for help" from two of the actresses in the film, Sarah Nicklin and Kristin Wall. The actresses were just acting out a scene; unbeknownst to residents in the area despite being made aware of the film's production by the director.

== Release ==
Green Apple Entertainment released the film via Amazon on August 8, 2017.
