= Mindy Robinson =

American TV personality

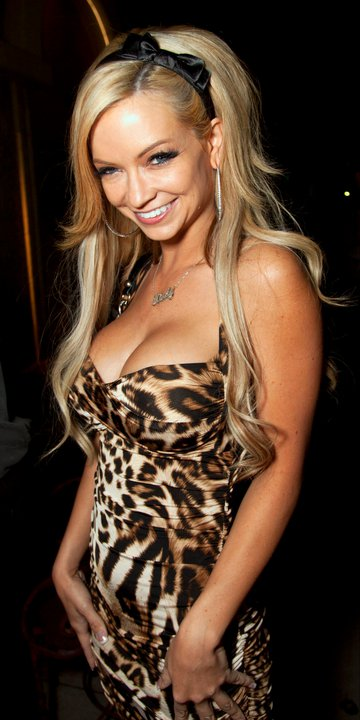
- Robinson in 2011
- Born: Melinda Lynn Robinson; February 14, 1980 (age 46); Fall River, Massachusetts, U.S.
- Occupation: actress
- Years active: 2011–present
- Height: 5 ft 5 in (165 cm)
- Partner: Randy Couture (2014-2025)
- Website: mindyrobinson.wordpress.com

Melinda Lynn Robinson (born February 14, 1980) is a reality TV show personality. Robinson is known for appearing as herself on network shows Take Me Out, King of the Nerds, Millionaire Matchmaker, and appears in the music video "Sexy and I Know It". She has also appeared in the films Abstraction, Pain & Gain, Casting Couch, Mantervention, V/H/S/2, and the comedy The Bet.

She often collaborated with her former boyfriend, former UFC heavyweight champion and actor Randy Couture. The two dated for 11 years before Robinson announced their separation in a Facebook post on February 12, 2025.

Robinson ran in the Republican primary for Nevada's 3rd congressional district in the 2020 election, finishing third. She ran as a Libertarian candidate for the Nevada Assembly's 35th district in the 2022 state election, again finishing third.

Robinson is a Far-Right activist and QAnon supporter who has pushed claims of election fraud in the 2020 United States presidential election and the 2022 Nevada gubernatorial election, claiming that "boxes of Biden votes fell from the sky". She was present at the Capitol during the January 6 United States Capitol attack in 2021. Robinson has also promoted conspiracy theories about COVID-19 vaccines, school shootings, and the moon landing.

== Filmography ==
=== Film ===
Year	Title	Role	Notes
2012	The Haunting of Whaley House	Candy Galore	
2013	Captain Battle: Legacy War	Anna	
2013	V/H/S/2	Tabitha	Segment: "Tape 49"
2013	Casting Couch	Kristin Fox	
2013	Bounty Killer	Estelle	
2013	Abstraction	Jenny	
2013	Fork You	Sandy	
2013	Errores de mi vida	Patricia Cruz	Video
2013	Lizzie Borden's Revenge	Ashley	
2013	Gingerdead Man vs. Evil Bong	Phoebe	
2013	Dracula: The Impaler	Ivina	
2013	Helen Keller Had a Pitbull	Suzy Barry	
2013	Bloodsucka Jones	Vega	
2014	Chicks Dig Gay Guys	Mandy	
2014	Burying the Ex	Mindy	
2014	After School Massacre	Linda	
2014	Alpha House	Abby	Video
2014	The Coed and the Zombie Stoner	Nurse Escandalo	
2014	Getting Worse	Jenny	
2014	Going to America	Nurse Betty	
2014	Live Nude Girls	Amber	
2014	Lost Angels	Veronica	
2014	7 Faces of Jack the Ripper	Catherine	
2014	The Oatmeal Man	Danielle	
2014	Our Way	Tory	
2014	Club Lingerie	Trisha	
2014	The Bitch That Cried Wolf	Maya	
2015	A Place Called Hollywood	Rena	
2015	Road Hard	Kristi	
2015	Evil Bong 420	Phoebe	
2015	Sister Code	Tiffany	
2015	Despair Sessions	Julia	
2015	A Blood Story	Madison Sheffield	
2015	Mansion of Blood	Shirley	
2015	Bikini Model Academy	Gangina	Video
2015	All American Bikini Car Wash	Tracy	
2015	Samurai Cop 2: Deadly Vengeance	Lauren Kimura	
2015	Ballet of Blood	Sylvie	
2015	Book of Fire	Lucilla	
2015	Less Than a Whisper	Mrs. Sandra	
2016	The Green Fairy	Green Fairy	Documentary
2016	Non-Stop to Comic-Con	Amber	
2016	Always Shine	Candy	
2016	Evil Bong: High 5	Phoebe	
2016	Nasty Piece of Work	Nurse Lola	
2016	Range 15	Eliza	
2016	The Bet	Kirsten Kelly Lucas	
2016	The American Gandhi	Candy	
2017	Check Point	Rebecca	
2017	You Can't Have It	Karen	
2017	Evil Bong 666	Lucy Furr	
2017	Adrenochrome	Maggie	
2017	All About the Money	Vanessa	
2017	You're Gonna Miss Me	Maxi Montana	
2017	Adam K	Det. Carli Mansfield	
2017	Bloodsucka Jones vs. The Creeping Death	Hanna Black	
2017	Brides of Satan	Mary	
2017	Not So Fast My Tooth Is Loose	Ashley	
2017	The Doll	Leslie	
2018	For the Hits	Tiff Nomorales	
2018	Diverted Eden	Jenny	
2018	Evil Bong 777	Phoebe	
2018	Warfighter	Darla Pope	
2018	5th Passenger	Thea	
2018	Abaddon	Mia Lewis	
2018	The Dip Run	Ericka	Filming
2019	Ted Bundy Had a Son	Grace	Post-production
2019	The Immortal Wars: Resurgence	Lauren	Post-production
2019	Mischief Upon Mischief	Morganne	Post-production
2019	Devotion	Wendy	Pre-production
2019	Christmas Cars	Evelyn Tisdale	DVD
2020	Stand On It	Fred	DVD
TBA	Bloody Island	Daisy	Completed
TBA	Hallucinogen	Amanda	Completed
TBA	White Zombie	Madame Pierrette	Post-production
TBA	Chocolate Is Not Better Than Sex	Hedda	Post-production
TBA	Bleach	Queen Isabella	Post-production
TBA	Antidote	Sasha	Post-production
TBA	The Kirkbride Project	Nancy	Filming
TBA	Roe v. Wade	Ellen McCormack	
TBA	Street 2	Kate	Pre-production
TBA	Spike Smiley: Halloween Night	Jen	Pre-production
TBA	Adrenochrome II	Vegas	Pre-production

=== Television ===
Year	Title	Role	Notes
2011–2013	My Roommate the	Various	4 episodes
2012	King Bachelor's Pad	The Bach's	"Last Wish", "Hunger Games", "Sherlock Homeboy"
2012	Operation Repo	Bianca	"Probation Abomination"
2012	We the People with Gloria Allred	Vivianne Morgan	"It's Not About the Clothes/Repo, Oh Man!"
2012–13	Veronique Von Venom: Horror Hostess Hottie	Veronique Von Venom	Main role
2012–2014	CSI: Crime Scene Investigation	Dahlia	"Karma to Burn", "Backfire", "Love for Sale"
2013	Yet 2 Be Named	Gina Danger	TV film
2013	Rest for the Wicked	Synthia	"Partners"
2013	Barter Kings	Sandy	"Tazed and Confused"
2013	Horror Haiku	Sarah	"It's Only a Game"
2013	Chelsea Lately	Diamond	"7.165"
2013	Mike and Corey in LaLa Land	Nurse Joy	"Food"
2013	Fox Shortcoms Comedy Hour	Mrs. Roberts	"Pilot"
2014	Down with David	Amber	"Relish the Reaching", "Grace"
2014	Bad Teacher	Elaine	"What's Old Is New"
2014	Matador	Kandy	"Code Red Card"
2014	Timid Pimps	Wheelchair Cindy	"Collect & Protect", "1.4"
2016	Hello California	Kelly	4 episodes
2016	Sharknado: The 4th Awakens	Annie	TV film
2016	I'm Offended	Mindy	TV film

=== Web ===
Year	Title	Role	Notes
2018	Anarcho-Capitalism: The Movie	News Anchor	Short Film
