= Atomic Brain Invasion =

- Film poster
- Directed by: Richard Griffin
- Written by: Guy Benoit; Richard Griffin
- Production company: Scorpio Film Releasing
- Distributed by: Scorpio Film Releasing
- Release date: August 2010
- Running time: 90 minutes
- Country: United States
- Language: English
- Budget: $20,000 (estimated)

Atomic Brain Invasion is a 2010 American science fiction comedy horror film directed by Richard Griffin. The film premiered in August 2010, and released to DVD on October 12, 2012. The film stars David Lavallee and Sarah Nicklin.

== Premise ==
When a spacecraft carrying an intergalactic plague crash-lands in a small New England town, it's up to a group of high schoolers and an alien abductee to stop the army of slime-spewing brain creatures from their one goal: kidnapping Elvis Presley.

== Cast ==
- David Lavallee as Jr. Sherman
- Sarah Nicklin as Betty
- Michael Reed as Lukas
- Daniel Lee White as Kevin
- Colin Carlton as Jim
- Ruth Sullivan as Siobahn
- Alexandra Cipolla as Raven
- Alexander Lewis as Blondie
- Rich Tretheway as O'Brien
- Brandon Luis Aponte as Elvis

== Reception ==
A review on the French website DarkSideReviews found that the "voluntarily cheap" production might not be to everyone's liking.

A review at DVD Talk wrote, "There are certainly a lot of moments of real fun in Atomic Brain Invasion, and the producers rightly embrace their super low budget aesthetic, but the plot is too disconnected and the laughs two sparse for the film to really succeed. It's not for lack of trying. All the actors are game, everyone is throwing it all in with gusto, but it all feels a bit underwritten. A lot of the gags don't work, or are a few beats off." A review in Rue Morgue 127 concluded, that the film "despite being cornier than a bowl of Fritos, is happy to have fun with or without you." A review in Shock Cinema wrote, "The film never rises to the inspired insanity levels of DISCO EXORCIST (heck, this one is barely PG!), but it’s still likeable."
