= Shiver Me Timbers (2025 film) =

2025 film by Paul Stephen Mann

- Theatrical release poster
- Directed by: Paul Stephen Mann
- Written by: Paul Stephen Mann
- Based on: Popeye by E. C. Segar
- Produced by: Paul Stephen Mann; Keith Montgomery; Alastair Statham
- Starring: Murdo Adams; Stephen Corrall; Tony Greer; Yu Heng Li; Amy Mackie
- Cinematography: Andrew Begg
- Edited by: Paul Stephen Mann
- Music by: Ryan Kerr
- Production companies: Alpake Entertainment; Edinburgh Film Productions
- Distributed by: Reel 2 Reel Films; Trinity Creative Partnership
- Release dates: February 28, 2025 (HORRHIFFIC); June 2, 2025 (United Kingdom)
- Running time: 74 minutes
- Country: United Kingdom
- Language: English

Shiver Me Timbers is a 2025 British splatter comedy horror film written and directed by Paul Stephen Mann. It stars Amy Mackie, Tony Greer, Brendan Nelson, Niamh Parrington, Murdo Adams, Stephen Corrall, Joel McDade, Ross Dillon, David Hallows, Paul Dewdney, Yu Heng Li and Leona Roberts. The film serves as a horror retelling of E. C. Segar's Popeye. It was released on April 1, 2025, by Gravitas Ventures.

The film is one of three live-action horror films featuring Popeye that were released in 2025 after the character became public domain in the United States: the other two are Popeye's Revenge and Popeye the Slayer Man.

== Plot ==
Set in the summer of 1986, Olive Oyl and her brother Castor venture into Northern California for a camping trip to witness the rare Halley's Comet meteor shower.

A reclusive fisherman named Popeye is fishing in solitude when a fragment of the comet crashes nearby, lodging itself in his corncob pipe, transforming Popeye into a grotesque, superhuman killer.

As the teens settle in the forest, Popeye kills a punk named Spike, causing his friend Skits to run away. In a secluded outhouse, Popeye sneaks up on Stevie, ripping his head off in a gruesome act before defecating on his body. He then skews Trent with a baseball bat and decapitates Lizzy. Olive, Castor, and Cyla scramble to formulate an escape plan.

Castor nearly escapes but is caught by Popeye, and douses him in toxic waste. Olive then discovers Lt. Lang, who tries to intervene, only to be bludgeoned to death by Popeye.

Just as Popeye is about to murder Cyla, Skits returns, blinding Popeye in one eye before Popeye crushes his skull beneath his boot. Olive grabs the comet fragment lodged in Popeye’s pipe (losing her hand in the process) and uses it to power a giant buzz saw she finds in Lt. Lang's cabin.

Olive and Popeye fight, ending with Olive slashing into Popeye's torso, killing him.

Back at home, Olive builds herself a robotic hand.

== Cast ==
- Murdo Adams as Skits
- Stephen Corrall as Lieutenant Lang
- Tony Greer as Popeye (post-transformation)
  - David Hallows as Popeye (pre-transformation)
- Ross Dillon as Trent
- Yu Heng Li as Monique
- Seb Lord as "Spike"
- Amy Mackie as Olive Oyl
- Keith Hewitt as Detective Montgomery
- Paul Dewdney as Homeless George
- Paul Stephen Mann as Detective Zanaletto
- Donnamarie McCusker as Mother
- Joel McDade as Stevie
- Brendan Nelson as Castor Oyl
- Niamh Parrington as Cylinda
- Leona Roberts as Lizzy
- John Ryder as DJ Bruce / The Narrator
- Alastair Statham as Detective Holmes
- Alexa Wright as Little Girl

== Production ==
The film was shot over a period of ten days in Edinburgh and its surrounding areas, with special effects combining practical techniques and computer-generated imagery (CGI).

== Release ==
The film premiered at Romford Horror Film Festival on February 28, 2025, and was released on April 1, 2025, under Gravitas Ventures. The film was then released in the United Kingdom digitally on June 2 by Reel 2 Reel Films. The film has proven to be divisive, inspiring passionate praise from some viewers and sharp criticism from others. It has gone on to receive a 2025 Fangoria Chainsaw Awards nomination and won an award at the Romford Horror Film Festival for its tent death scene. It also won Best Feature at the inaugural Gorewave Film Festival in Spain.

== Planned sequel ==
On December 6, 2025, following the release of a teaser trailer, a sequel, Shiver Me Timbers 2: Chainsaws Are for Children, was announced to be in development, with Mann returning as director and Greer and Mackie reprising their respective roles as Popeye and Olive. The project also included Tarzan – reimagined like Popeye as a murderous antagonist – and Betty Boop, the latter having entered the public domain later that month.
