= Sarah Nicklin =

American actress

- Born: Danbury, Connecticut, U.S
- Occupation: Actress
- Years active: 2006–present

Sarah Nicklin is an American actress and producer born in Danbury, Connecticut. rue-morgue.com has called her "the darling of indie horror".

== Career ==
She appeared in a number of independent films, including horror and comedy horror films such as V/H/S/Halloween, Popeye the Slayer Man, Atomic Brain Invasion, The Basement, and The Retaliators. Her first notable film role was Sister Kelley Wrath in the action comedy independent cult movie hit Nun of That.

She also appeared in Netflix's children's TV Show Blippi's Job Show as Farmer Fran.

Her credits include over 100 features and shorts so that in 2017 Starburst Magazine called her "the ubiquitous indie horror girl" and Daily Dead described her as "genre favorite Sarah Nicklin". She is known for her timeless girl next door quality, strong emotional range, and ability to combine strength and vulnerability in her characters.

== Partial filmography ==
=== Film ===
Year	Title	Role	Notes
2006	Detour Into Madness Vol 2.	Jennifer/Lisa	
2007	Splatter Disco	Danni	
2008	Beyond the Dunwich Horror	Nikki Hartwell	
2008	Nun of That	Sister Wrath	
2009	Circuit	Emily	
2009	Across Dot Ave.	Christine	
2009	Manifest Breakfast	Mary	
2010	Phillip the Fossil	Julie's Friend	
2010	Bird Talk	Bell	
2010	Atomic Brain Invasion	Betty	
2010	Choices	Sarah	Best Actress Nom.
2010	Nun of That	Sister Kelly Wrath	
2011	The Unproductive	Wendy	
2011	His Take on Her	Elena	
2011	The Disco Exorcist	Amoreena Jones	
2011	Exhumed	Laura	Won Best Actress
2011	Cost of the Living: A Zom Rom Com	Emily Clancy	
2011	Beg	Lily Wallace	
2012	The Black Dahlia Haunting	Detective Hoffman	
2012	Salinger Spies	Becky Salinger	
2013	Normal	Shelley	
2013	Debeaked	Kate	Best Actress Nom.
2014	Missing William	Young Woman	
2014	The Rude, the Mad, and the Funny	Mary	
2014	Victimized	Sarah Thompson	Won Best Actress
2014	The Haunting of Alice D	Delilah	
2014	The Sins of Dracula	Shannon	
2015	Abandoned Dead	Rachel Burke	
2015	Quest for a Different Outcome	Emma	
2017	From Hell, She Rises	Marguerite	
2017	Adam K	Amanda Cole	
2017	Escape the Dark	Jackie Moody	Won Best Actress
2018	Among Them	Ginger	
2018	Bath Bomb	Girl	
2018	The Basement	Reporter Amanda Kincaid	
2019	American Exit	Inn Receptionist	
2019	The Office Is Mine	Lauren	
2020	The Body of Levi	Sarah Brown	Won Best Ensemble Cast
2020	Sorority House	Agnis/Angie	
2021	Pretty Boy	Jill	
2021	The Retaliators	Emily	
2021	That Night	Head Nurse	
2021	Angel City Horror	Malinda	Best Actress Nom.
2023	The Black Mass	Charlotte Turner	
2023	A Great Divide	Local Young Woman	
2023	Spaghetti	May	
2023	Everwinter Night	Cailyn	
2024	The Long Game	Danielle	
2024	Garden of Eden	Patricia	
2025	Popeye the Slayer Man	Adrienne	
2025	V/H/S/Halloween	Nancy	

=== Television ===
Year	Title	Role	Notes
2007	Brotherhood	Prostitute	Episode: "Not Dark Yet 3:5–6" & "Dear Landlord 1:3–4"
2011	Chase Belafonte's Working Title	Kristi Phoenix	Recurring Cast
2012	Love Squared	Becca	Episode: "Thanks for Listening"
2015	Dark Corners Horror Anthology	Becca/Bloody Mary	Episode: "Quiet" & "Bloody Mary"
2016	The Bold and the Beautiful	Sasha's Makeup Artist	Episode: "Episode #1.7246"
2016	Unusual Suspects	Gilda Tierney	Episode: "Ashes to Ashes"
2020	Scary Endings	Nicole	Episode: "Jacob"
2020	It Listens from the Radio	Poppy	Episode: "To Live or Die at the Drive-In"
2025	Blippi's Job Show	Farmer Fran	Episode: "Farmers"

=== Music Videos ===
Year	Song	Artist	Role
2016	"Blood Eagle Wings"	Anthrax	Tortured Woman on Floor
2020	"Every Time You Leave"	I Prevail (featuring Delaney Jane)	Herself
