= Popeye the Slayer Man =

2025 American slasher film

- Theatrical release poster
- Directed by: Robert Michael Ryan
- Screenplay by: John Doolan
- Story by: Cuyle Carvin; Jeff Miller; Robert Michael Ryan
- Based on: Popeye by E. C. Segar
- Produced by: Alyssa Blasetti; Cuyle Carvin; Jeff Miller; Robert Michael Ryan; Nathan Todaro; Alexander Tucker
- Starring: Sean Michael Conway; Elena Juliano; Jason Stephans; Mabel Thomas; Marie-Louise Boisnier; Jeff Thomas; Angela Relucio; Sarah Nicklin
- Cinematography: Korey Nowe
- Production companies: Millman Productions; Otsego Media; Ron Lee Productions; Salem House Films
- Distributed by: Vantage Media
- Release date: March 21, 2025
- Running time: 88 minutes
- Country: United States
- Language: English

Popeye the Slayer Man is a 2025 American slasher film serving as a horror reimagining of E. C. Segar's character Popeye the Sailor Man. Directed by Robert Michael Ryan, it stars Jason Stephens, Sarah Nicklin, Mabel Thomas, Sean Michael Conway, Angela Relucio, and Scott Swope. The story follows a group of friends who become hunted by the "Sailor Man" upon investigating the abandoned spinach canning factory he resides in.

The film is one of three live-action horror films featuring Popeye that were released in 2025 after the character entered the public domain in the United States: the other two are Popeye's Revenge and Shiver Me Timbers. A sequel to Popeye the Slayer Man is in development.

== Plot ==
One night, drug dealers Miguel and Vincent chase a young woman named Adrienne, who's stolen a stash of cocaine from them, into the old Anchor Bay Cannery - a long-abandoned dockside building rumored to be haunted by the "Sailor Man". Just as they corner her, the two are brutally slain by a massively, supernaturally strong figure. The next day, Lex Alistair, the CEO who owns both the town and the cannery, meets with Harrigan, a lawyer for a development firm planning to tear the place down. Harrigan brings up her clients' concerns about contamination reports that led to the facility's twenty-year closure, which Alistair continues to deny. As their conversation ends, the smell of pipe smoke drifts by; Alistair goes to investigate while Harrigan is startled by Alistair's security guard, Angus, dropping an important file. After they leave, Angus searches the premises and stumbles upon the dead dealers before meeting his end at the hands of the Sailor Man.

Dexter, a student at SUNY Oneonta, decides to film a documentary about the infamous Sailor Man before the old cannery is torn down, joined by his crush Olivia—whose past is a mystery—and friends Lisa, Seth (Lisa’s love interest), and Katie. The group meets at the factory, unaware that Katie’s jealous boyfriend, Joey, and his buddies Jesse and Terry are secretly following them, convinced she’s cheating on Joey with Dexter. While Katie stays behind to hook up surveillance gear to Dexter’s cameras, the others pair off to explore. Meanwhile, Harrigan shows up looking for the missing folder but falls into Sailor Man’s hands, who rips out her hair and kills her with the cannery’s machinery.

In the offices, Dexter and Olivia find a report revealing dangerous cost-cutting measures that led to spinach contamination and was kept a secret from the public. After reuniting with Seth and Lisa, they push forward, while Katie has her first terrifying encounter with Sailor Man. She runs and collides with Joey’s crew; Jesse and Terry are killed when they attack Sailor Man, and Joey flees, leaving Katie behind. Later, Joey takes Terry’s gun and accidentally shoots Katie, mistaking her for Sailor Man, before abandoning her once again to face the murderer alone. Sailor Man begins stalking the other students, prompting Seth to make a desperate dash to the roof. He slips, knocking loose several rebar rods that fatally impale him. Lisa, fleeing the same way, falls onto Seth’s body and the bars, dying instantly. Meanwhile, Dexter and Olivia stumble upon Sailor Man’s quarters, discovering he’s been eating the contaminated spinach, which gave him superhuman strength but also mutated him. They find a photo of his wife and child, plus newspaper clippings about Olive Oyl, a factory worker who tried to expose the contamination scandal before mysteriously vanishing.

Determined to uncover the truth, they make it to the exit but find themselves cornered by Sailor Man. He snaps Dexter’s arm until Olivia demands he stop—and, shockingly, he listens. She reveals she’s his daughter, a fact she only discovered a year earlier. As she begs him to let them go, a deranged Joey attacks. Sailor Man allows their escape, before tearing off Joey’s arm and killing him with it. Outside, they come across an injured Katie, spared by Sailor Man, who has already called the police. As the bodies are taken away, Olivia and Dexter see him watching from a window and promise to come back to help. Later, when Alistair storms into the cannery, enraged over the cancelled development deal and threatening to destroy the place himself, Sailor Man ambushes and kills him.

== Cast ==
- Jason Stephens as Popeye the Sailor Man (credited as "The Sailor Man")
- Sean Michael Conway as Dexter
- Elena Juliano as Olivia
- Mabel Thomas as Katie
- Marie-Louise Boisnier as Lisa
- Sarah Nicklin as Adrienne
- Jeff Thomas as Seth
- Steven McCormack as Joey Spiro
- Clayton Turner as Jesse
- Paul Konye as Terry
- Richard Lounello as Lex Alistair (credited as "Lex")
- Angela Relucio as Margot Harrigan (credited as "Margot")
- Scott Swope as Angus
- Joel Frometa as Miguel
- Christian Elan Ortiz as Vincent
- Doug Decker as Bernie
- Nathan Todaro as Detective Caruso
- Amanda Catapano as Police Officer

== Production ==
Robert Michael Ryan directs the film from a screenplay by John Doolan. Jeff Miller, Cuyle Carvin, and Ryan made the story. Along with Miller, Carvin and Ryan, Alexander Tucker, Nathan Todaro, and Alysa Blasetti are set to produce the film. Ronnie D. Lee was the executive producer, Korey Rowe was the director of photography, R.J. Young managed the especial makeup FX. The deal was negotiated by Jessica Russo and Andre Relis of VMI Worldwide and Jeff Miller on the producing team.

The film was shot and wrapped in the New York state.

== Release ==
The film was released in theaters and VOD on March 21, 2025, under Vantage Media.

== Reception ==
Jimmyo of JoBlo.com gave the film a rating of 6 out of 10 and said: "The script by John Doolan, with story credit going to Cuyle Carvin and Jeff Miller, has a few funny moments, but it ultimately felt a bit predictable. However, it has affectionately goofy moments of Popeye lore. And that's when Popeye is the most fun."

Norman Gidney of HorrorBuzz rated the film 6 out of 10 and wrote, "It's hokey, it's goofy, but darn-it, he is what he is."

== Sequel ==
On May 8, 2026, the sequel titled Popeye the Slayer Man 2 has begun filming in upstate New York. Deadline Hollywood reported that Daniel Baldwin and Avaryana Rose are confirmed to be part of the sequel.
