= Best Wishes to All =

2023 film directed by Yûta Shimotsu

- Film poster
- Japanese: みなに幸あれ
- Directed by: Yûta Shimotsu
- Written by: Rumi Kakuta; Yûta Shimotsu
- Story by: Yûta Shimotsu
- Produced by: Shin'ichirô Inoue; Takashi Shimizu
- Starring: Masashi Arifuku; Kotone Furukawa; Aine Hara
- Production company: Kadokawa Corporation
- Release dates: June 2, 2023 (SIFF); January 12, 2024 (Japan)
- Running time: 89 minutes
- Country: Japan
- Language: Japanese

Best Wishes to All (Note: alternatively known as Best Regards to All and Happiness to All.) (Japanese: みなに幸あれ, romanized: Mina ni sachi are) is a 2023 Japanese horror film directed by Yûta Shimotsu, based on his award-winning 2022 short film of the same name.

== Plot ==
All characters are unnamed.

The protagonist, a young nursing student who lives in Tokyo, arrives several days early for a planned family gathering at her grandparents' countryside home.

The girl's grandmother and grandfather dote on her, but she is quickly unsettled by their strange behavior and the moaning noises coming from a locked upstairs bedroom. Her grandparents claim there is nothing inside.

During a pork supper, when the moaning starts again, the protagonist's grandparents drown it out by oinking and redirect the conversation to a defense of factory hog farming. They claim the pigs slaughtered to feed humans are happy to be useful.

After several more disturbing encounters with people in the village, who seem to view casual cruelty and bullying as socially normal, the protagonist opens the locked upstairs room and discovers her grandparents have been keeping a mutilated captive bound to a dirty mattress. She sets him free, but he wanders blindly down the road and dies after being hit by a truck.

None of the adults in town, including the protagonist's former peers, her newly arrived parents or the truck driver, appear surprised or disturbed by the captive's existence. The protagonist's father dismissively sets the man's corpse on fire and takes the entire family back to her grandparents' house.

The protagonist learns that her grandparents' kidnapping and torture of their prisoner were part of a normal practice in their town. Families in the region are supernaturally blessed with happiness and good fortune as long as they keep another human being — a scapegoat — in a state of constant suffering.

Because their captive is now dead, the family is in danger. They must find a new one, or they will deteriorate and die in a matter of days.

After searching fruitlessly for another solution, the protagonist reluctantly picks her family's new victim: a childhood friend whose family had refused to participate in the scapegoating practice. Because of their refusal, the friend's family has struggled with money, health and the success of their rice farm. The friend willingly submits to being imprisoned and tortured in her grandparents' upstairs room.

The protagonist returns happily to Tokyo. One day, while walking down a residential street, she glances into the upstairs window of a house and sees someone closing the curtains.

== Cast ==
- Kotone Furukawa as the protagonist, a nursing student who struggles to accept that her family's happiness depends on the exploitation of others.
- Masashi Arifuku as the protagonist's grandfather.
- Yoshiko Inuyama as the protagonist's grandmother.
- Kôya Matsudai as the protagonist's childhood friend, a talented artist who was forced to take over his family's rice farm after his father became ill. He believes his family's bad luck is a result of their refusal to participate in the local practice of scapegoating.

== Production ==
Best Wishes to All is based on the 2022 short film of the same name, which won the Grand Prize at the inaugural Japan Horror Film Competition. The feature film was shot in 2022 and was in post-production as of March 2023.

== Release ==
Best Wishes to All had its world premiere at the Shanghai International Film Festival on June 2, 2023, where it played under the title Happiness to All. It was released in Japan on January 12, 2024. The film was released on Shudder in the US, UK and Ireland on June 13, 2025.

== Reception ==
On the review aggregator website Rotten Tomatoes, 77% of 30 critics' reviews are positive. Metacritic, which uses a weighted average, assigned the film a score of 70 out of 100, based on 4 critics, indicating "generally favorable" reviews.

In a glowing Rolling Stone review, David Fear called Best Wishes to All "the best Japanese horror movie in decades, and quite possibly the single best horror movie you'll see this year, period." Zachary Lee, writing for RogerEbert.com, gave the film 3 stars out of 4, calling it "unsettling" and "a modern parable for our capitalistic society, where our only hope for achieving contentment is to exploit before we’re exploited." Gregory Nussen, writing for Slant Magazine, likewise interprets the film as a commentary on capitalism as well as on the "epidemic of loneliness."

== See also ==
- Zero-sum game
- Weltschmerz
- The Ones Who Walk Away from Omelas
