= Three Blind Mice (2023 film) =

- Film Poster
- Directed by: Pierre B.
- Produced by: Rhys Frake-Waterfield; Scott Chambers
- Starring: May Kelly; Lila Lasso; Carl Hughes; Danielle Ronald; Natasha Tosini
- Cinematography: Vince Knight
- Edited by: Rhys Frake-Waterfield
- Music by: Andrew Scott Bell
- Production company: Dark Abyss Productions
- Distributed by: ITN Productions
- Release date: October 17, 2023
- Running time: 83 minutes
- Country: United Kingdom
- Language: English

Three Blind Mice is a 2023 British slasher film. It is based off the nursery rhyme Three Blind Mice. The film stars May Kelly, Lila Lasso, Karl Hughes, Danielle Ronald and Natasha Tosini.

== Plot ==
Abi, a recovering drug addict is taken to a secluded cabin by her family to overcome her addiction. Where they are attacked and have to survive the Three Blind Mice.

== Cast ==
- May Kelly as Abi
- Lila Lasso as Lara
- Carl Hughes as Mark
- Danielle Ronald as Squealer
- Keith Eyles as Keith
- Julia Quayle as Scratch
- Samantha Cull as Sniff
- Lynne O’Sullivan as Jude
- Helen Fullerton as Cara
- Natasha Tosini as Cassie
- Marcus Massey as Gerard
