= Paul Barber (actor) =

English actor (born 1951)

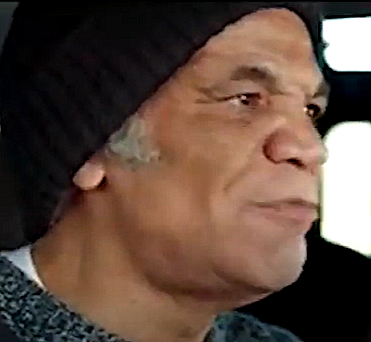
- Barber in 2018
- Born: Patrick Barber; 18 March 1951 (age 75); Toxteth, Liverpool, England
- Occupation: Actor
- Years active: 1974–present
- Notable work: Only Fools and Horses; The Full Monty

Paul Barber (born Patrick Barber, 18 March 1951) is an English actor. In a career spanning more than 45 years, he is best known for playing Denzil in Only Fools and Horses and Horse in The Full Monty. He also had two small parts in Coronation Street, first as Billy Arrowsmith in 2004, then as Nelson in 2008.

== Early life ==
Barber was taken into care at the age of seven, following the death of his mother, Margret, from tuberculosis. His mother was from Middlesbrough. His father died when Patrick (or Paddy as he was then known) and his brothers Brian, Paul, Mike and sisters Claudette and Lorraine were very young. Whilst he was in care, he was abused both physically and mentally. He notes that he has suffered like others, but channelled his emotions into acting.

== Acting career ==
Barber began on the stage in the musical Hair. His first major TV role was as Sam "Lucky" Ubootu in the 1974 ITV Playhouse production Lucky, set in Liverpool and made by Granada TV. He then played the flamboyant but vicious gang boss Malleson in a Play for Today episode and Series 1 of the off-beat BBC Birmingham-based series Gangsters from 1975 to 1976. He played Louis St John in four episodes of I Didn't Know You Cared from 1976 to 1978. A later starring role was alongside Philip Whitchurch in the mid-1980s ITV comedy series The Brothers McGregor.

Barber has worked extensively in British TV, such as in To the Manor Born (1979) as a Jamaican steel band musician; Minder (1980) as Willie Reynolds in episode Don't Tell Them Willie Boy was Here; Only Fools and Horses (1981–2003); Boys from the Blackstuff (1982); and as Malcolm in The Front Line;

In 1991, he played Earl Preston, a football coach, in the BBC Screen One television play Alive and Kicking. In 1995, he appeared as ill-fated social worker Ian McVerry in an episode of Cracker opposite Robbie Coltrane, John Simm and Liam Cunningham, and he played Greg Salter in Brookside (1994).

Barber made a guest appearance in the first episode of The Green Green Grass—a spin-off from Only Fools and Horses. He was best known for his role in Only Fools and Horses, and still attends fan conventions for the show.

In 2008, he had a small part in the long-running ITV soap opera Coronation Street playing a club owner, Nelson, an acquaintance of Vernon Tomlin.

In Terry Pratchett's Going Postal (2010), he played a pin-fanatic shop owner. He also starred in White Van Man as Hooky Pete in February 2012.

Also in 2012, Barber played the role of Captain in Sky1's Sinbad. He appeared as Captain Jack Parrot in Death in Paradise on 18 February 2014.

Barber also appeared as Fieldhouse in Home from Home in the 2016 pilot episode, and he appeared again in the 2018 series. In 2017, Barber guest-starred in two episodes of the CBBC Tracy Beaker spin-off series The Dumping Ground as a homeless man, George.

The following year, Barber appeared in two episodes of Casualty as Ernest Maxwell, reprising the role in 2019. He had previously appeared in Casualty a number of times as other characters.

== Film work ==
He had small roles in the big-screen version of Porridge (1979) and The Long Good Friday (1980).

Barber's best known movie role was playing one of the stripping steelworkers in the 1997 film The Full Monty. He reunited with Full Monty co-star Robert Carlyle and Samuel L. Jackson in the Liverpool-based crime film The 51st State (2001).

In 2002, He played the role of Luther in the drama The Hidden City. In 2006, he starred in the feature film Dead Man's Cards, again returning to Merseyside, playing the part of Paul, the head doorman at a Liverpool club.

In the 2014 film One Night in Istanbul, Barber plays a cabbie who is down on his luck and with his friend, Tommy, strikes a deal with a local gangster that allows them to take their young sons to watch Liverpool Football Club play in Turkey.

Barber was cast alongside Alexei Sayle and Ricky Tomlinson in 2017's Gloves Off. He also appears in the 2022 crime action thriller film Renegades and stars in the 2024 horror film The Baby in the Basket.

== Personal life ==
Barber was awarded an honorary doctorate from Liverpool John Moores University in July 2011 for "outstanding contribution to the performing arts". He lives in Clacton, Essex.

== Filmography ==
=== Film ===
| Year | Title | Role | Notes |
|---|---|---|---|
| 1977 | The Quality Connection | Jim | Short film |
| 1979 | Porridge | Morgan | |
| 1980 | The Long Good Friday | Erroll | |
| 1980 | The Terence Davies Trilogy | (segment: Madonna and Child) | Trilogy of short films |
| 1983 | The Terence Davies Trilogy | (segment: Death and Transfiguration) | Trilogy of short films |
| 1993 | U.F.O. | Doctor Who (voice) | |
| 1994 | Priest | Charlie | |
| 1997 | The Full Monty | Horse | |
| 2000 | Wild About Harry | Professor Simmington | |
| 2001 | The 51st State | Frederick | |
| 2002 | Mad Dogs | Jimmy Joyce | |
| 2003 | The Virgin of Liverpool | Winston Churchill | |
| 2004 | French Fries on the Golden Front | Clown | Short film |
| 2006 | Splinter | Dan | |
| 2006 | Dead Man's Cards | Paul | |
| 2010 | Mam | The Chemist | Short film |
| 2011 | The Turtle & the Nightingale | Liam's Dad | Short film |
| 2012 | The Boxer | Joe | Short film |
| 2013 | The Magnificent Eleven | Trainer | |
| 2013 | The Pugilist's Son | Jimmy Gotts | Short film |
| 2013 | The Grendel Toots | Paul | Short film |
| 2014 | One Night in Istanbul | Gerry | |
| 2016 | Souls | Barrie | Short film |
| 2017 | Gloves Off | Albert | |
| 2018 | A Stitch in Time | Ant | Short film |
| 2019 | Down | Dennis | Short film |
| 2020 | Denmark | The Captain's father | |
| 2020 | Hickory Dickory Dock | Winston | |
| 2022 | Renegades | Harris | |
| 2023 | The One Note Man | Florist | Short film |
| 2024 | The Baby in the Basket | Amos | |

=== Television ===
| Year | Title | Role | Notes |
|---|---|---|---|
| 1974 | ITV Playhouse | Sam 'Lucky' Ubootu | Episode: Lucky |
| 1975 | Play for Today | Malleson | Episode: Gangsters |
| 1975 | Z-Cars | Gambler | Episode: "Eviction" |
| 1976 | Gangsters | Malleson | 6 episodes |
| 1976–1978 | I Didn't Know You Cared | Louis St. John | 6 episodes |
| 1978 | Crown Court | Lennie Jackson | Episode: "Does Your Mother Know You're Out?" |
| 1978 | Mixed Blessings | Man in robe | Episode: "The Housewarming" |
| 1979 | To the Manor Born | Mackenzie McLeod | Episode: "The Summer Hunt Ball" |
| 1979 | Return of the Saint | Winston | Episode: "The Obono Affair" |
| 1980 | Minder | Willie Reynolds | Episode: "Don't Tell Them Wille Boy Was Here" |
| 1980 | Cribb | George Williams | Episode: "Wobble to Death" |
| 1981 | The Chinese Detective | Ned | Episode: "Ice and Dust" |
| 1982 | Boys from the Blackstuff | Docks – Scotty | Episode: "Moonlighter" |
| 1982 | Muck and Brass | Louis Delano | Episode: "Open Government" |
| 1982–1985 | The Front Line | Malcolm | 6 episodes |
| 1983–1996, 2001–2003 | Only Fools and Horses | Denzil Tulser | 18 episodes |
| 1984 | Charlie | 2nd Electrician | Episode: "If You're Not Part of the Solution, You're Part of the Problem" |
| 1985–1988 | The Brothers McGregor | Wesley McGregor | 26 episodes |
| 1987 | Carrott Confidential | Various Characters | 1 episode |
| 1989 | All Change | Driver (Series Two) | TV series |
| 1990 | Boon | Angus | Episode: "Trouble in the Fields" |
| 1990 | ScreenPlay | Drugs Counsellor | Episode: "Needle" |
| 1990 | Chancer | Gerald | 11 episodes |
| 1991 | Screen One | Earl Preston | Episode: "Alive and Kicking" |
| 1991 | Taking the Floor | Security Guard 2 | Episode: "Dancing in the Dark" |
| 1991–2019 | Casualty | Ernest Maxwell/Carl Myers/Cliff Sidwell ... | 11 episodes |
| 1993 | The Lodge | Winston | Episode: "Worthy Causes" |
| 1993–1995 | The Bill | Ade Fellowes/Ted | 2 episodes |
| 1994 | 99-1 | Bobby Fletcher | Episode: "Doing the Business" |
| 1994 | Brookside | Greg Salter | 26 episodes |
| 1995 | The Big One | Security Guard | TV film |
| 1995 | Cracker | Ian McVerry | Episode: "Best Boys: Part One" |
| 1997 | The History of Tom Jones, a Foundling | Adderley | 1 episode |
| 1997 | The Drew Carey Show | Paul Barber | Episode: "The Dog and Pony Show" |
| 1999 | Harbour Lights | Cordell Johnson | Episode: "Baywatch" |
| 2000 | Taggart | Jimmy McEvoy | Episode: "Football Crazy" |
| 2002 | Nice Guy Eddie | Big Dawn | 2 episodes |
| 2002 | Holby City | Sean Meacher | Episode: "Gamblers" |
| 2002 | The Hidden City | Luther | TV film |
| 2002 | Babyfather | Landlord | 1 episode |
| 2002 | Single Voices | Godfrey | Episode: "Little Pinch of Chilli" |
| 2003–2018 | Doctors | Gary Alan/Ned Heath | 2 episodes |
| 2004–2008 | Coronation Street | Nelson/Billy Arrowsmith | 3 episodes |
| 2005 | The Green Green Grass | Denzil Tulser | Episode: "Keep on Running" |
| 2006 | The Street | First Patient | Episode: "Stan" |
| 2006 | Dalziel and Pascoe | Clive Griffin | 2 episodes |
| 2007 | Liverpool Nativity | Landlord | TV film |
| 2008 | The Invisibles | Young Nick | 6 episodes |
| 2008 | Caught in a Trap | Donald | TV film |
| 2010 | Terry Pratchett's Going Postal | Dave Pins | 2 episodes |
| 2012 | Sinbad | Captain | Pilot |
| 2012 | Preston Passion | Simon | TV film |
| 2012 | White Van Man | Hooky Pete | Episode: "Charity" |
| 2013 | The Slammer | The Balloonatic | Episode: "The Balloonatic" |
| 2014 | Death in Paradise | Captain Jack | 1 episode |
| 2017 | The Dumping Ground | George | 2 episodes |
| 2018 | Home from Home | Fieldhouse | 5 episodes |
| 2018 | The Card Room Chronicles | Charlie | Episode: "Card Room Chronicles" |
| 2019 | Moving On | Geoff | Episode: "A Walk in My Shoes" |
| 2019 | The Small Hand | Brother Thierry | TV film |
| 2019 | A Very British Christmas | Paul | TV film |
| 2021 | Matchmakers | Gladstone | 6 episodes |
| 2021 | Call The Bailiffs: Time To Pay Up | Narrator | 6 episodes |
| 2023 | The Full Monty | Barrington "Horse" Mitchell | TBC |
