= Cannibal Mukbang =

- Directed by: Aimee Kuge
- Written by: Aimee Kuge
- Produced by: Aimee Kuge
- Starring: April Consalo; Nate Wise; Clay von Carlowitz; Randall Bowlin; Autumn Consalo; Benjamin Frankenberg
- Cinematography: Harrison Kraft
- Edited by: Aimee Kuge; Hayley Zalkin
- Music by: Alex Cuervo
- Production company: Melty Media
- Release date: October 14, 2023 (Brooklyn Horror Film Festival)
- Running time: 100 minutes
- Country: United States
- Language: English

Cannibal Mukbang is a 2023 American horror romantic comedy film written, directed and produced by Aimee Kuge in her feature directorial debut. It stars April Consalo, Nate Wise and Clay von Carlowitz. The film world premiered at the Brooklyn Horror Film Festival on October 14, 2023, later screening at the Austin Film Festival and Panic Fest. It was released by Jackrabbit Media on March 25, 2025.

== Premise ==
A man down on his luck with love meets a mysterious woman who brings him into the world of mukbang.

== Cast ==
- April Consalo as Ash
- Nate Wise as Mark
- Clay von Carlowitz as Maverick
- Randall Bowlin
- Autumn Consalo
- Benjamin Frankenberg

== Production ==
The feature directorial debut for writer and producer Aimee Kuge. Harrison Kraft was the cinematographer and Alex Cuervo composed the score. The production took place in August 2022 in Bergen County, New Jersey.

== Release ==
The film had its world premiere at the Brooklyn Horror Film Festival on October 14, 2023. It was later selected for the Dark Matters Feature competition at the 2023 Austin Film Festival before screening at Panic Fest in 2024. The film was released on video on demand on March 25, 2025 by Jackrabbit Media. A Blu-ray release came later on April 22.

== Reception ==
On the review aggregator website Rotten Tomatoes, 93% of 15 critics' reviews are positive, with an average rating of 6.7/10.

Nadine Whitney of the Alliance of Women Film Journalists praised the visuals and performances. Douglas Laman of The Spool commended the romantic and violent aspects of the story. Paz O'Farrell of ScreenAnarchy extolled the cinematography.

Neil Bolt of ComingSoon.net gave the film 8 out of 10. Tom Atkinson of Film Threat scored it 7 out of 10. Alexandra Heller-Nicholas of the Alliance of Women Film Journalists was mixed after the narrative turned it into a rape and revenge film.
