= The Mouse Trap (film) =

2024 Canadian slasher film

- Promotional release poster with original title
- Directed by: Jamie Bailey
- Written by: Simon Phillips
- Produced by: Mem Ferda
- Starring: Sophie McIntosh; Callum Sywyk; Allegra Nocita; Ben Harris; Mireille Gagné; Mackenzie Mills; James Laurin; Kayleigh Styles; Jesse Nasmith; Madeline Kelman; Damir Kovic; Nick Biskupek; Simon Phillips
- Cinematography: Jamie Bailey
- Edited by: Jamie Bailey
- Music by: Darren Morze
- Production companies: Into Frame Productions; Bailey Phillips Productions
- Distributed by: Gravitas Ventures
- Release date: August 6, 2024
- Running time: 80 minutes
- Country: Canada
- Language: English
- Budget: $800,000
- Box office: $109,973

The Mouse Trap (also known as Mickey's Mouse Trap) is a 2024 Canadian comedy slasher film directed, shot and edited by Jamie Bailey and written by Simon Phillips. It is a horror reimagining of Walt Disney's 1928 animated short film Steamboat Willie, the first appearance of Mickey Mouse. The film stars Phillips as a hypnotized manager masked as Mickey, who traps and terrorizes a group of friends inside an amusement arcade.

Originally titled as Mickey's Mouse Trap, the film was announced on January 1, 2024, the same day Mickey's Steamboat Willie version went into the public domain. As Disney still retains exclusive rights to the depictions of the character from their own franchise, the film avoids any changes to his design from later appearances. The film later changed its title to The Mouse Trap in July 2024.

The Mouse Trap was originally set for a worldwide theatrical release in March 2024 but had several delays. It was eventually released on demand in the United States on August 6, and Blu-ray on August 13, 2024, by Gravitas Ventures. It received negative reviews from critics. A sequel, titled The Mouse Trap: Welcome to The Mickeyverse, is in production.

== Plot ==
Detectives Cole and Marsh attempt to interview Rebecca, a survivor of a recent massacre at an amusement arcade, so that they can learn who was behind the murders. Rebecca is reluctant and claims that they all will be killed if she tells them, but eventually begins to explain what happened.

A while in the past, arcade employees Alex and Jayna are told by their boss Tim Collins to stay on a late shift due to a last-minute booking. Later, whilst watching a copy of Steamboat Willie on a film projector, he comes across a Mickey Mouse mask that begins speaking to him. Tim, in a trance, slowly puts the mask on.

After Jayna leaves the arcade, Alex witnesses Tim wearing the Mickey mask as he chains up one of the exits. Worried, Alex attempts to flee but stumbles upon her crush Marcus and her other friends—Ryan, Paul, Jackie, Gemma, Danny, Marie, and Rebecca— as it is revealed the booking was arranged by them to throw a surprise birthday party for her.

As the party gets into full swing, Ryan gathers everyone's phones in a bag and leaves them on a counter. Meanwhile, Paul and Jackie head into a jungle gym to have sex, where Mickey appears and attacks them with a knife. The rest of the group learn that the exits have been chained shut, and the phones have been stolen. They split up to look for Paul and Jackie, while Rebecca encounters Mickey, who is now able to teleport but is easily scared off by flashing lights.

Mickey attacks Marie, but she manages to escape before he can kill her. She informs Alex and Marcus, believing Ryan is the one who attacked her since he is nowhere to be found. Alex then discovers that the lights and phone lines are down before she, Marcus, and Marie find the corpses of Paul and Jackie. Alex activates the arcade's fire alarm in order to alert emergency services but Mickey kills Gemma and Danny, teleports into the laser tag arena and slits Rebecca's ankle.

Alex sees Jayna returning to the arcade, but is unable to warn her about Mickey before he teleports and kills her. She finds Marcus and Marie interrogating Ryan, making them realize he is innocent. Mickey then appears and attacks them. Alex uses a flashlight to distract Mickey as Marcus knocks him down with a baseball bat, but Mickey teleports away before they can finish him off.

The survivors realize that they can use Mickey's light phobia to nullify his teleportation. They lure him into the jungle gym and activate the strobe lights, disorienting Mickey as they beat him down. However, Mickey manages to turn off the lights with telekinesis and teleports away; he reappears behind Alex and decapitates her before disappearing. Back in the present, the detectives refuse to believe Rebecca's story and leave her locked inside her cell.

In a post-credits scene, Mickey arrives at the police station, frees Rebecca from her cell, and tells her that there are some people he wants her to meet. Rebecca smiles at Mickey and follows him.

== Cast ==
- Simon Phillips as Mickey Mouse / Tim Collins
- Sophie McIntosh as Alex Fen
- Madeline Kelman as Jayna
- Ben Harris as Ryan
- Callum Sywyk as Marcus
- Mireille Gagné as Gemma
- James Laurin as Paul
- Kayleigh Styles as Jackie
- Mackenzie Mills as Rebecca
- Jesse Nasmith as Danny
- Allegra Nocita as Marie
- Damir Kovic as Detective Cole
- Nick Biskupek as Detective Marsh

== Production ==
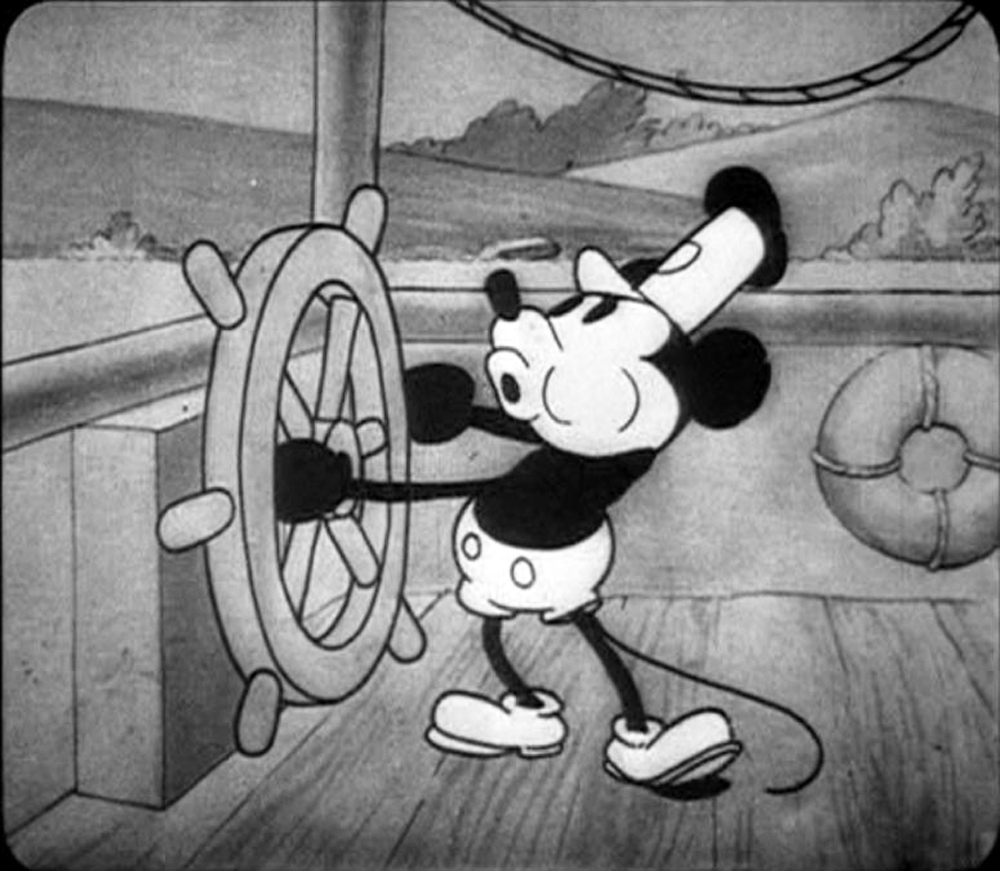
The original Steamboat Willie version of Mickey Mouse entered into the U.S. public domain in 2024, but any elements that would be unique to later depictions of the character had to be avoided.

On January 1, 2024, the first animated works starring Mickey Mouse, notably Steamboat Willie, entered the public domain in the US and Canada. The day the copyright lapsed, the film—then titled Mickey's Mouse Trap—was revealed to the public as its first trailer was released online along with several other works based on the short, such as Infestation: Origins, a Mickey-themed independent horror game.

Speaking to The Hollywood Reporter, director Jamie Bailey stated: "We just wanted to have fun with it all. I mean it's Steamboat Willie‘s Mickey Mouse murdering people. It's ridiculous. We ran with it and had fun doing it and I think it shows." Bailey also expressed surprise that there were not more similar projects and that they were among the first to create such a film, as the crew "thought we'd be lost in the shuffle, to be completely honest". The film avoids referring to the titular villain as "Mickey Mouse" while ensuring that "it's very clear who it's supposed to be".

Principal photography took place in Funhaven, an amusement arcade in Ottawa, Canada, over the course of 8 days in Summer 2023.

== Release ==
The Mouse Trap was originally scheduled to be theatrically released worldwide in March 2024 before being postponed for unknown reasons. It was later rescheduled to be released in the US by Gravitas Ventures via video on demand on August 6, 2024, with a Blu-ray release following on August 13.

== Reception ==
Writing for The Guardian, Phil Hoad awarded the film one out of five stars and criticized the film's existence as a "parasitic...out-of-copyright grave-robber" while also having a "convoluted, sloppy" story. Decider's John Serba criticized the film's characters, dialogue, and Bailey's direction, ultimately comparing the film unfavorably with Winnie-the-Pooh: Blood and Honey, a horror film similarly based on another public domain character. Variety's Dennis Harvey wrote, "There's no attempt to mimic the famous squeaky voice, to parody or even reference anything else in the Mouse House universe. The sum impact is like a joke with a promising-enough setup but no punchline."

== Sequel ==
In September 2024, a sequel titled The Mouse Trap: Welcome to The Mickeyverse began filming. It is scheduled for release in 2026 or 2027.

== See also ==
- Works based on a copyright-free Mickey Mouse
