= Popeye's Revenge =

2025 British slasher film

- Official release poster
- Directed by: William Stead
- Written by: Harry Boxley
- Based on: Popeye by E. C. Segar
- Produced by: Rene August
- Starring: Steven Murphy; Emily Mogilner; Connor Powles; Danielle Ronald; Bruno Cryan; Kelly Rian Sanson
- Music by: James Cox
- Production company: ITN Studios
- Distributed by: Dazzler Media
- Release dates: February 13, 2025 (United States); May 5, 2025 (United Kingdom)
- Running time: 80 minutes
- Country: United Kingdom
- Language: English

Popeye's Revenge is a 2025 British slasher film directed by William Stead and written by Harry Boxley. It is produced by ITN Studios, and stars Steven Murphy, Emily Mogilner, Connor Powles, Danielle Ronald, Bruno Cryan and Kelly Rian Sanson.

The film is one of three live-action horror films featuring Popeye that were released in 2025 after the character entered the public domain in the United States: the other two are Popeye the Slayer Man and Shiver Me Timbers. Popeye's Revenge was produced by ITN Studios that also produced the Twisted Childhood Universe films, though it does not take place in the same cinematic universe.

Popeye's Revenge was released in the US on February 13, 2025 on VOD before being made available six days later on Amazon Prime Video. It received negative reactions from critics. A sequel, Popeye's Return, was released on May 6, 2026.

== Plot ==
In a quiet coastal town in the United Kingdom, a boy named Johnny was born with abnormally large, muscular forearms and a pronounced chin. His peculiar appearance made him the target of relentless bullying at school, where he often dons a sailor outfit. One day, pushed to his limits after a bully hurts his friend, the boy snaps and kills one of his tormentors by strangulation which also results in the boy's eyes popping out of their sockets. To protect their son, his parents hide him in their basement, where he receives comforting notes from an unseen friend slipping messages under the door. However, the townspeople, driven by fear and anger, form a mob to seek vengeance on the "Popeye" killer and set the family's home on fire. While his parents perish in the fire, Johnny escapes but seemingly drowns in a nearby lake. The townsfolk believe the nightmare is over.

Years later, a group of young adults, including Tara, Dylan, and Donna, inherit the now-rebuilt house where the tragedy occurred. Unaware of its dark history, they plan to convert it into a summer camp. As they settle in, eerie occurrences begin to unfold, and members of the group start disappearing under mysterious circumstances.

Johnny, now going by the name of Popeye with immense strength and a thirst for vengeance, emerges from the shadows. Donning his sailor attire, he embarks on a killing spree, targeting the intruders of his former home. His methods are brutal and inventive, utilizing anchors, ropes, and other nautical tools to dispatch his victims.

Adding to the terror, Olive, Johnny's sister and the other resident of the basement, arrives as his accomplice. Together, they orchestrate the murders. As the survivors dwindle, Tara and Dylan confront Popeye and Olive in a desperate bid for survival. In a climactic battle, Olive is killed, and Tara uses a lawn mower to gruesomely dispatch Popeye. However, Popeye reappears, attacking Tara.

== Cast ==
- Steven Murphy as Popeye / Johnny
- Emily Mogilner as Tara
- Connor Powles as Dylan
- Danielle Ronald as Donna
- Bruno Cryan as Nick
- Atlanta Moreno as Sky
- Karolina Ugrenyuk as Kathy
- Fyn Phoenixx as Max "Beanie"
- Kyle Jordan as Alan
- Eva Ray as Cherry
- Danielle Scott as Mia
- Amanda Jane York as Lora
- Oliver Mason as George
- Kathi DeCouto as Jane
- Paul Frost as Fisherman
- Kelly Rian Sanson as Olive Oyl
- Max Arlott as Body On Boat

== Release ==
The film was released on VOD in the United States on February 13, 2025, and released in Prime Video on February 19, 2025. Dazzler Media released the film in the United Kingdom on digital, DVD and Blu-ray on May 5, 2025.

== Reception ==
Jeff Ewing of Collider gave the film a rating of 3 out of 10, commenting that while the film included some good performances and clever ideas, it ultimately felt like a "duct-taped collection of ideas directly lifted from other horror films" with a sound mix that made the dialogue difficult to understand at times.

Greg Archer of MovieWeb gave the film a 1 over 5 rating and said that while the "violence and kills should definitely please gore-hounds and horror fans", the film was "a bloody mess, both figuratively and literally", that stripped away the character's "genuine swagger" by turning him into a "soulless thug".
