= I Heart Willie =

- Theatrical release poster
- Directed by: Alejandro G. Alegre
- Written by: David Vaughn
- Produced by: Arturo Rentería; Liz Sanchez; David Vaughn
- Starring: Maya Luna; Micho Camacho; Sergio Rogalto; Daniela Porras; David Vaughn
- Cinematography: Alejandro G. Alegre
- Edited by: Zach Lapidus
- Music by: Pocholo Guillar
- Production company: Anerke
- Distributed by: Hewes Pictures; Rubey Entertainment
- Release date: November 8, 2024 (Morbido Film Fest)
- Running time: 89 minutes
- Country: Mexico
- Language: English

I Heart Willie is a 2024 English-language Mexican independent slasher horror film shot and directed by Alejandro G. Alegre from a screenplay by David Vaughn. It is a horror reimagining of Walt Disney's 1928 animated short film Steamboat Willie, the first appearance of Mickey Mouse.

The film premiered at the Morbido Film Fest on November 8, 2024.

== Plot ==
In this horrific origin story of the most beloved cartoon character of modern times, an obsessed fan of Steamboat Willie leads her friends into a deadly mousetrap where pure evil seeks to harvest their skin.

== Cast ==
- Maya Luna as Nora
- Micho Camacho as Nico
- Sergio Rogalto as Daniel
- Daniela Porras as Jess
- David Vaughn as Willie

== Release ==
I Heart Willie premiered at the Morbido Film Fest on November 8, 2024. The film was released theatrically in the United States on February 26, 2025.

== Reception ==
Carla Hay of Culture Mix wrote "A weak and tedious horror movie depicting Mickey Mouse's Steamboat Willie character as a serial killer. Note to filmmakers who want to make a slasher flick based on a public domain character: Do something clever with the character's unique life story." Matt Donato of IGN wrote in his review "I Heart Willie is an overcomplicated, underdelivered, and all-around disappointing public domain slasher that can’t even get rudimentary filmmaking techniques right." Writing for Blu-ray.com, Brian Orndorf stated "Alegre gets about as far as torture and suffering in the feature, which isn’t suspenseful, but something created quickly to cash-in on a trend that, so far, viewers don’t really care about."
