= Mouse of Horrors =

- Official release poster
- Directed by: Brendan Petrizzo
- Screenplay by: Harry Boxley; Marc Gottlieb
- Produced by: Anthony C. Ferrante; Brendan Petrizzo
- Starring: Natasha Tosini; Allie Moreno; Lewis Santer; Chris Lines; Stephen Staley
- Cinematography: Charlie Steeds
- Edited by: Rob Pallatina
- Music by: James Cox
- Production company: ITN Studios
- Release date: January 25, 2025
- Running time: 84 minutes
- Country: United Kingdom
- Language: English

Mouse of Horrors is a 2025 British independent slasher horror film produced and directed by Brendan Petrizzo from a screenplay by Harry Boxley and Marc Gottlieb. It is a reimagining of Walt Disney and Ub Iwerks's 1928 animated short film Steamboat Willie. The film is one of many, similar horror films that were created once the Steamboat Willie version of Mickey Mouse entered the public domain on January 1, 2024.

Mouse of Horrors was released on DVD, Blu-ray, and streaming in the United States on January 25, 2025.

== Premise ==
Chloe, preparing to leave Wales for the U.S., attends a private farewell party at an empty fun fair. As the night unfolds, she and her friends are hunted by two masked killers, a mouse and a bear, working for a deranged scientist who needs women's body parts for his twisted experiments.

== Cast ==
- Lewis Santer as The Killer
- Stephen Staley as The Bear
- Chris Lines as Dr. Rupert
- Natasha Tosini as Chloe
- Allie Moreno as Kim
- Erin Sanderson as Meg
- Rosie Edwards as Lucy
- Harry Giubileo as Charlie
- Nichaela Farrell as Brandy
- Jake Watkins as Jake
- Danielle Scott as Taylor
- Thomas K. Murphy as Michael
- Tessa Wood as Janet
- Eve Vice as Dana
- Misti Taylor as Molly
- Johnny Vivash as Paul Chamberland
- Nicholas Soden as Ryan the Runner
- Michelle Bauer as Silvia Sand
- Geretta Geretta as Sinthia Sharp

== Release ==
Mouse of Horrors was released on DVD, Blu-ray, and streaming in the United States on January 25, 2025.

== Reception ==
John Serba of Decider was critical, writing "Screamboat might be the best this dumb subgenre ever gets – and it's still crapicalifragilisticexpialidocious. SKIP IT." WhatCulture was also negative, naming it one of the worst horror movies of 2025. Nerdly was more favorable, stating that "Whatever the story behind it, an abortive attempt at a sequel to Winnie the Pooh: Blood and Honey or a badly edited standalone feature, Mouse of Horrors may not be objectively good, but it is bloody, and bloody strange enough, to keep me amused at the absurdity of it all."
